= 1932 =

1932 in various calendars
- Gregorian calendar: 1932; MCMXXXII
- Ab urbe condita: 2685
- Armenian calendar: 1381; ԹՎ ՌՅՁԱ
- Assyrian calendar: 6682
- Baháʼí calendar: 88–89
- Balinese saka calendar: 1853–1854
- Bengali calendar: 1338–1339
- Berber calendar: 2882
- British Regnal year: 22 Geo. 5 – 23 Geo. 5
- Buddhist calendar: 2476
- Burmese calendar: 1294
- Byzantine calendar: 7440–7441
- Chinese calendar: 辛未年 (Metal Goat); 4629 or 4422 — to — 壬申年 (Water Monkey); 4630 or 4423
- Coptic calendar: 1648–1649
- Discordian calendar: 3098
- Ethiopian calendar: 1924–1925
- Hebrew calendar: 5692–5693
- Hindu calendars
- Vikram Samvat: 1988–1989
- Shaka Samvat: 1853–1854
- Kali Yuga: 5032–5033
- Holocene calendar: 11932
- Igbo calendar: 932–933
- Iranian calendar: 1310–1311
- Islamic calendar: 1350–1351
- Japanese calendar: Shōwa 7 (昭和７年)
- Javanese calendar: 1862–1863
- Juche calendar: 21
- Julian calendar: Gregorian minus 13 days
- Korean calendar: 4265
- Minguo calendar: ROC 21 民國21年
- Nanakshahi calendar: 464
- Thai solar calendar: 2474–2475
- Tibetan calendar: ལྕགས་མོ་ལུག་ལོ་ (female Iron-Sheep); 2058 or 1677 or 905 — to — ཆུ་ཕོ་སྤྲེ་ལོ་ (male Water-Monkey); 2059 or 1678 or 906

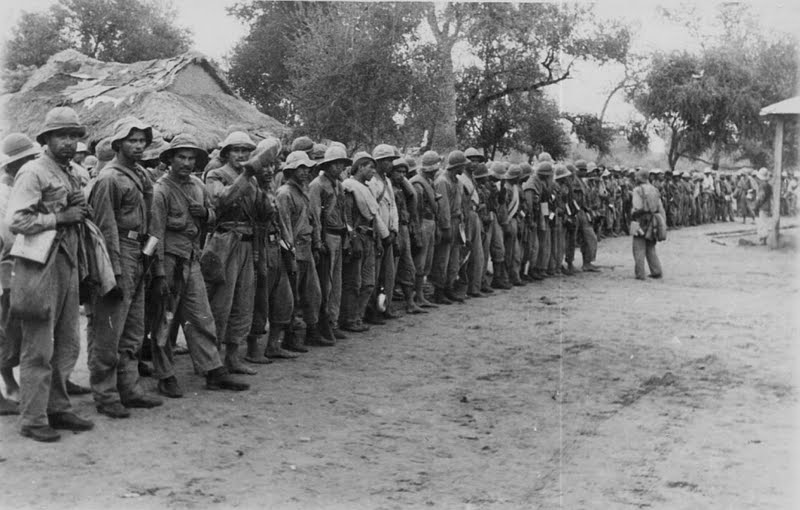
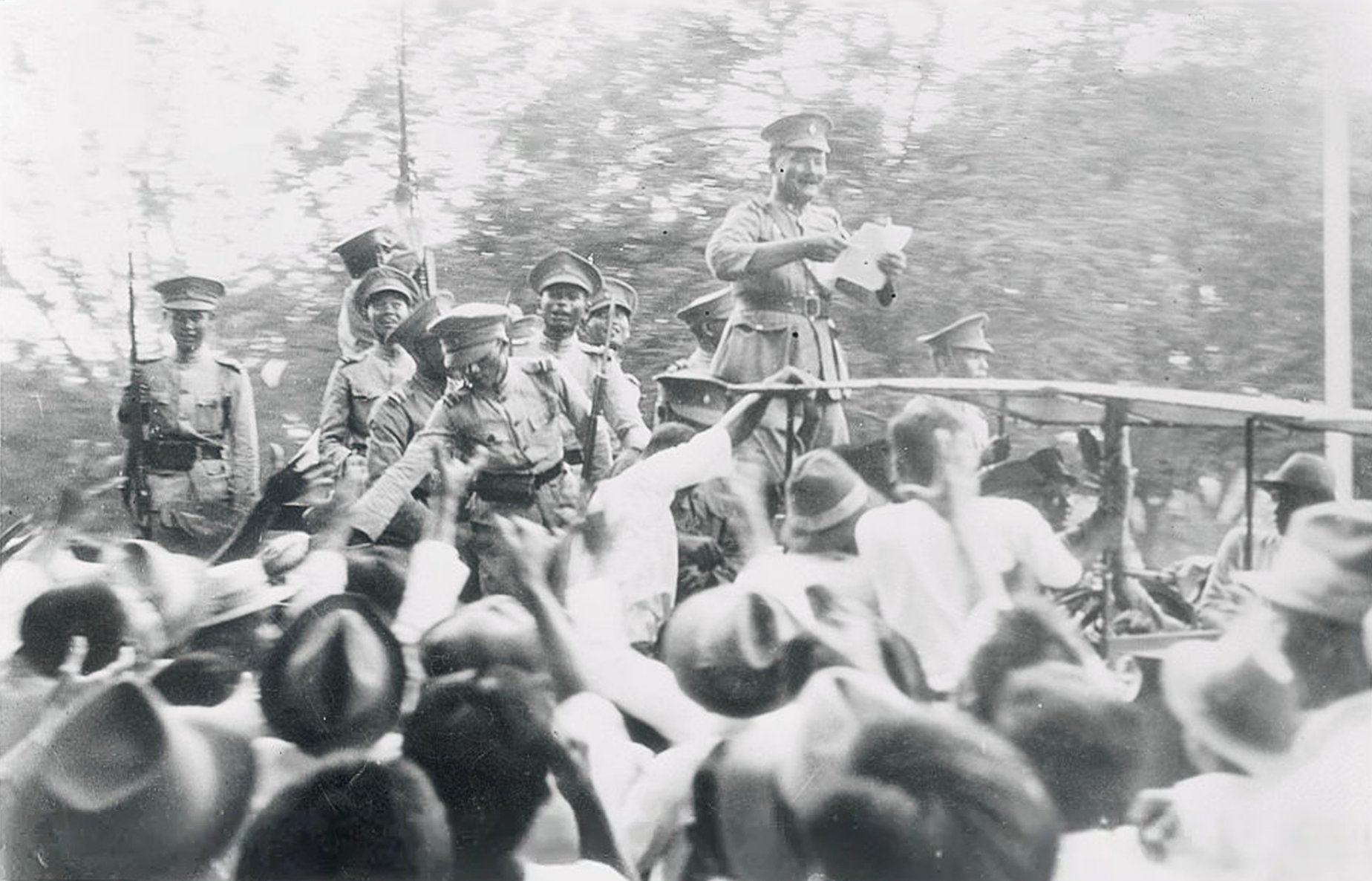
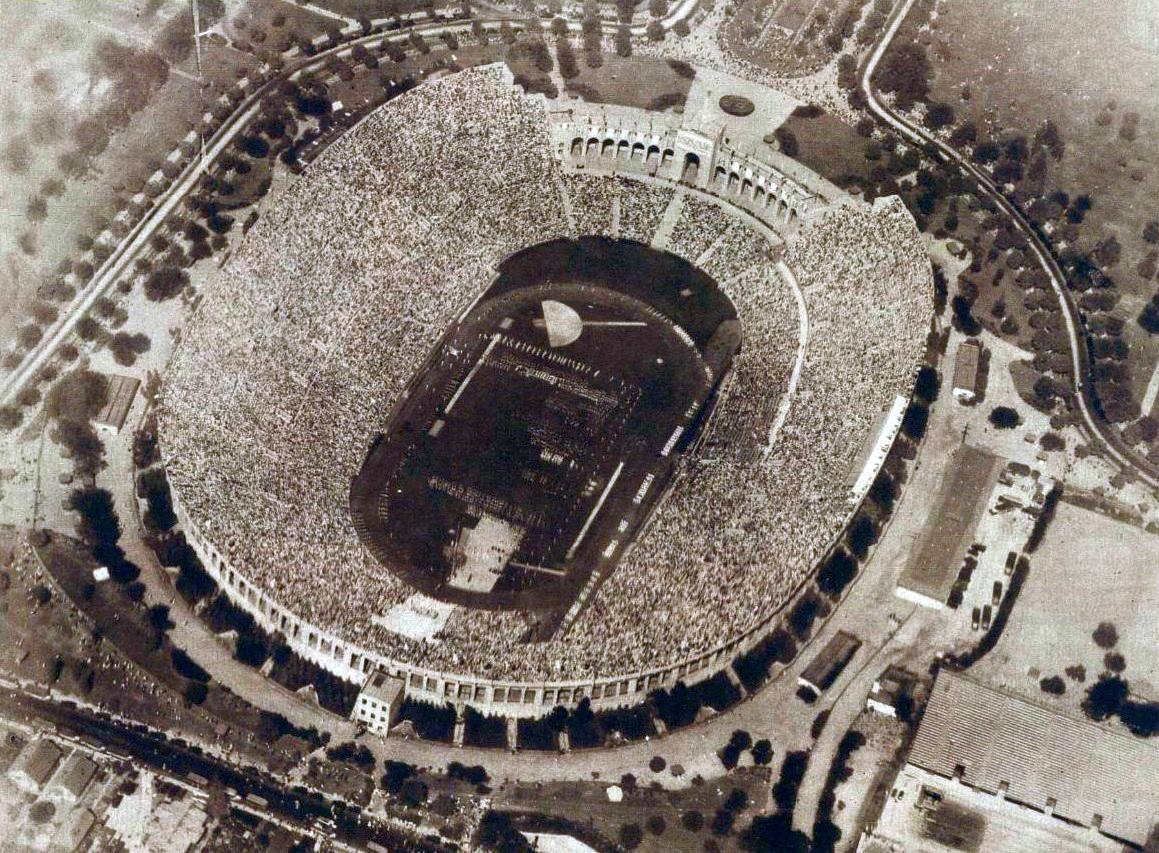
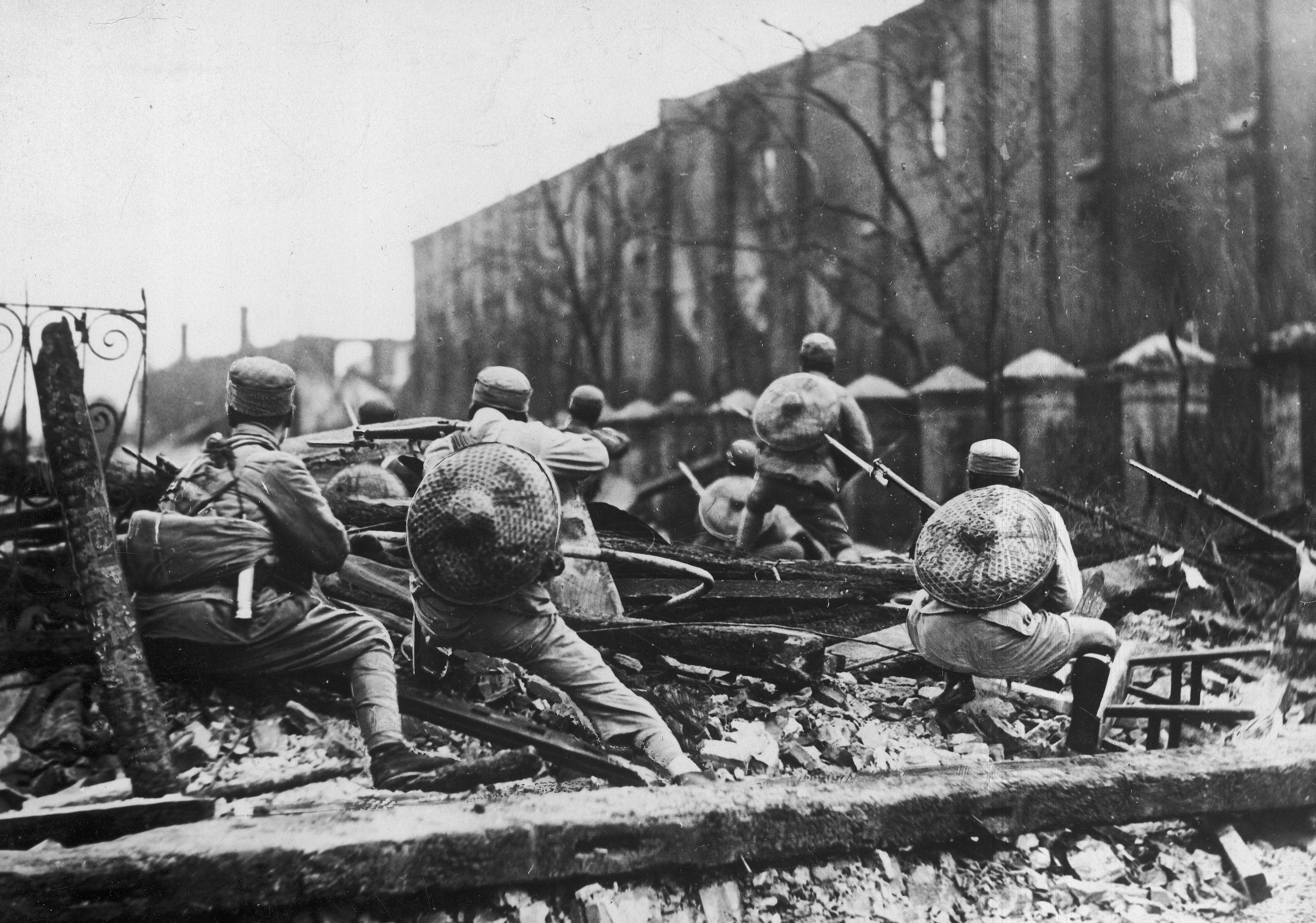
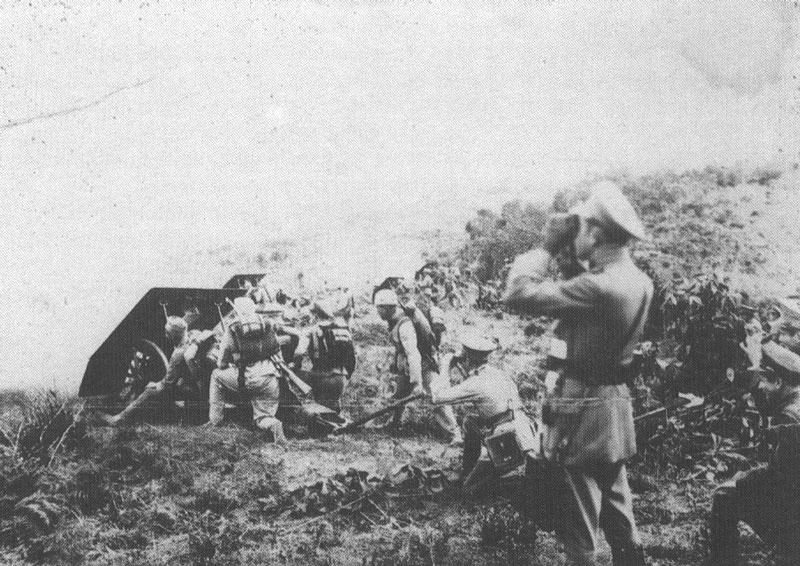
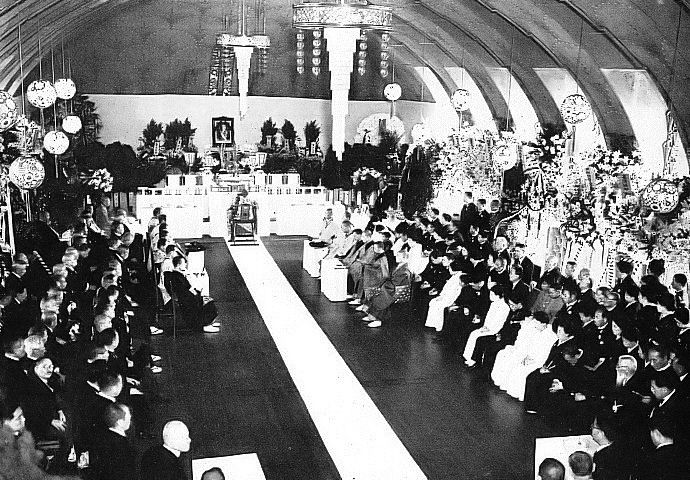
From top to bottom, left to right:
- The Chaco War erupts between Bolivia and Paraguay over control of the Gran Chaco, becoming one of South America’s deadliest conflicts of the 20th century;
- The Siamese revolution of 1932 peacefully ends centuries of absolute monarchy in Siam and establishes a constitutional government;
- The 1932 Summer Olympics are held in Los Angeles, showcasing athletic achievement amid the hardships of the Great Depression;
- The January 28 incident in Shanghai sees Japanese forces clash with Chinese troops, heightening tensions in East Asia and foreshadowing broader conflict;
- The Colombia–Peru War breaks out over disputed Amazonian territory, leading to months of fighting before a negotiated settlement;
- The May 15 incident in Japan results in the assassination of Prime Minister Inukai Tsuyoshi by young naval officers, signaling a shift toward militarism in Japanese politics.

1932 (MCMXXXII) was a leap year starting on Friday of the Gregorian calendar, the 1932nd year of the Common Era (CE) and Anno Domini (AD) designations, the 932nd year of the 2nd millennium, the 32nd year of the 20th century, and the 3rd year of the 1930s decade.

== Events ==
=== January ===
- January 4 – The British authorities in India arrest and intern Mahatma Gandhi and Vallabhbhai Patel.
- January 9 – Sakuradamon Incident: Korean nationalist Lee Bong-chang fails in his effort to assassinate Emperor Hirohito of Japan. The Kuomintang's official newspaper runs an editorial expressing regret that the attempt failed, which is used by the Japanese as a pretext to attack Shanghai later in the month.
- January 12 – Hattie W. Caraway of Arkansas becomes the first woman to be elected to the United States Senate, succeeding her late husband, Thaddeus Caraway, in a special election,
- January 22 – The 1932 Salvadoran peasant uprising begins; it is suppressed by the government of Maximiliano Hernández Martínez.
- January 24 – Marshal Pietro Badoglio declares the end of Libyan resistance.
- January 26 – British submarine aircraft carrier HMS M2 sinks with the loss of all 60 onboard on exercise in Lyme Bay in the English Channel.
- January 28 – January 28 incident: Conflict between Japan and China in Shanghai.
- January 31 – Japanese warships arrive in Nanking.

=== February ===
- February 2
  - A general World Disarmament Conference begins in Geneva. The principal issue at the conference is the demand made by Germany for Gleichberechtigung ("equality of status" i.e. abolishing Part V of the Treaty of Versailles, which had disarmed Germany) and the French demand for sécurité ("security" i.e. maintaining Part V).
  - The League of Nations again recommends negotiations between the Republic of China and Japan.
  - The Reconstruction Finance Corporation begins operations in Washington, D.C.
- February 4
  - The 1932 Winter Olympics open in Lake Placid, New York.
  - Japan occupies Harbin, China.
- February 9 – League of Blood Incident: Junnosuke Inoue, prominent Japanese businessman, banker and former governor of the Bank of Japan is assassinated by the right-wing extremist group the League of Blood.
- February 11 – Pope Pius XI meets Benito Mussolini in Vatican City.
- February 15 – Clara, Lu & Em, generally regarded as the first daytime network soap opera, debuts in its morning time slot over the Blue Network of NBC Radio in the United States, having originally been a late evening program.
- February 18 – Japan declares Manchukuo (Japanese name for Manchuria) formally independent from China.
- February 25 – Adolf Hitler obtains German citizenship by naturalization, opening the opportunity for him to run in the 1932 German presidential election.
- February 27 – The Mäntsälä rebellion occurs in Finland.

=== March ===
- March 1
  - Lindbergh kidnapping: Charles Lindbergh Jr., the infant son of Charles and Anne Morrow Lindbergh, is kidnapped from the family home near Hopewell, New Jersey. On May 12 he is found dead just a few miles away.
  - Japan installs Puyi as puppet emperor of Manchukuo.
- March 2 – The Mäntsälä rebellion ends in failure; Finnish democracy prevails. The Lapua Movement is condemned by conservative Finnish president Pehr Evind Svinhufvud in a radio speech.
- March 5 – Dan Takuma, prominent Japanese businessman and director of the Mitsui Zaibatsu conglomerate is assassinated by the radical right-wing League of Blood group.
- March 9 – Éamon de Valera is elected President of the Executive Council of the Irish Free State, the first change of government in the country since its foundation 10 years previously.
- March 11 - Booming Ben, the last known heath hen died in captivity
- March 14 – George Eastman, founder of Kodak, commits suicide in Rochester, New York.
- March 18 – Peace negotiations between China and Japan begin.
- March 19 – The Sydney Harbour Bridge opens in Australia.
- March 20 – The Graf Zeppelin airship begins a regular route between Germany and South America.
- March 21–22 – 1932 Deep South tornado outbreak: A series of deadly tornadoes in the United States kills more than 220 people in Alabama, 34 in Georgia and 17 in Tennessee.
- March 22 – Tarzan the Ape Man premieres in New York City, first of the classic film series starring Johnny Weissmuller and Maureen O'Sullivan.

=== April ===
- April 5
  - 10,000 disgruntled Newfoundlanders march on their legislature to show discontent with their current political situation; this is a flash point in the demise of the Dominion of Newfoundland.
  - The first Alko stores are opened in Finland at 10 in the morning (local time) following the end of Prohibition in that country, resulting in a new mnemonic "543210".
- April 6
  - U.S. president Herbert Hoover supports armament limitations at the World Disarmament Conference.
  - The trial of fraudulent art dealer Otto Wacker begins in Berlin.
- April 11 – 1932 German presidential election: Paul von Hindenburg is re-elected as Reichspräsident, defeating Hitler.
- April 13 – German Chancellor Heinrich Brüning bans the SA and the SS as threats to public order, arguing that they are chiefly responsible for the wave of political violence afflicting Germany.
- April 14 – John Cockcroft and Ernest Walton, at the Cavendish Laboratory in the University of Cambridge (England), focus a proton beam on lithium and split its nucleus ("splitting the atom").
- April 17 – Haile Selassie announces an anti-slavery law in Abyssinia.
- April 19 – German art dealer Otto Wacker is sentenced to 19 months in prison for selling fraudulent paintings he attributed to Vincent van Gogh.
- April 25
  - Gladys Elinor Watkins consecrates the carillon of the National War Memorial in New Zealand.
  - The bodies of Hudhayfah ibn al-Yaman and Jabir ibn Abd Allah, two of the companions of Islamic prophet Muhammad, are moved from their graves in Salmaan Paak following a dream of King Faisal I of Iraq that they are affected by water.
- April 29 – Korean pro-independence paramilitary Yun Bong-gil detonates a bomb at a gathering of Japanese government and military officials in Shanghai's Hongkou Park, killing General Yoshinori Shirakawa and injuring Mamoru Shigemitsu and Vice Admiral Kichisaburō Nomura.

=== May ===
- May 6
  - Paul Gorguloff shoots French president Paul Doumer in Paris; Doumer dies the next day.
  - The politically powerful General Kurt von Schleicher meets secretly with Adolf Hitler. Schleicher tells Hitler that he is scheming to bring down the Brüning government in Germany and asks for Nazi support of the new "presidential government" Schleicher is planning to form. Schleicher and Hitler negotiate a "gentlemen's agreement" where in exchange for lifting the ban on the SA and SS and having the Reichstag dissolved for early elections this summer, the Nazis will support Schleicher's new chancellor.
- May 10
  - There are violent scenes in the German Reichstag building in Berlin as Hermann Göring and other Nazi MRDs attack the Defense Minister General Wilhelm Groener for his lack of belief in a supposed Social Democratic putsch. After the debate, General Schleicher tells Groener that he has lost the confidence of the Army and must resign at once.
  - Albert Lebrun becomes the new president of France.
  - James Chadwick, working at the Cavendish Laboratory in the University of Cambridge, reports the existence of the neutron.
- May 12 – General Wilhelm Groener resigns as German Defense Minister. Schleicher takes control of the Defense Ministry.
- May 13 – The Premier of New South Wales, Jack Lang, is dismissed by the State Governor, Sir Philip Game.
- May 15 – May 15 Incident, an attempted military coup in which Japanese prime minister Tsuyoshi Inukai is assassinated by naval officers. Japanese troops leave Shanghai.
- May 16 – Massive riots between Hindus and Muslims in Bombay leave thousands dead and injured.
- May 20–21 – Amelia Earhart flies from the United States to County Londonderry, Northern Ireland in 14 hours 54 minutes.
- May 20 – Federación Obrera de la Industria de la Carne initiates a major strike in the Argentinian meat-packing industry.
- May 20 – The American Friends of Lafayette is founded at Lafayette College in Easton, Pennsylvania
- May 25 – Goofy makes his appearance in the Disney animated short Mickey's Revue.
- May 26 – Judgement in Donoghue v Stevenson handed down in the House of Lords of the United Kingdom, creating the modern concept of a duty of care in British law.
- May 30 – German chancellor Heinrich Brüning is dismissed by President von Hindenburg. President Hindenburg asks Franz von Papen to form a new government, known as the "Government of the President's Friends", which is openly dedicated to the destruction of democracy and the Weimar Republic. The downfall of Brüning is largely the work of Schleicher, who has been scheming against him since the beginning of May. Schleicher takes the position of Defense Minister in his friend Papen's government.

=== June ===
- c. June – The Republican Citizens Committee Against National Prohibition is established for the repeal of Prohibition in the United States.
- June 4
  - A military coup occurs in Chile.
  - The Papen government in Germany dissolves the Reichstag for elections on July 31 in the full expectation that the Nazis will win the largest number of seats.
- June 14 – The Papen government lifts the ban against the SS and SA in Germany.
- June 16– Lausanne conference opens to discuss reparations, which Germany had not paid since the Hoover Moratorium of June 1931.
- June 20 – The Benelux customs union is negotiated.
- June 24 – After a relatively bloodless military rebellion, Siam becomes a constitutional monarchy.
- June 25 – India plays its first Test cricket match with England at Lord's.

=== July ===
- July 5 – António de Oliveira Salazar becomes the prime minister of Portugal, a position he would hold for the next 36 years.
- July 7 – French submarine Prométhée sinks with the loss of 62 of 69 onboard on trial out of Cherbourg in the English Channel.
- July 8 – The Dow Jones Industrial Average in the United States reaches its lowest level of the Great Depression, bottoming out at 41.22.
- July 9
  - The Constitutionalist Revolution starts in Brazil with the uprising of the state of São Paulo.
  - Lausanne conference ends, agreeing to cancel World War I reparations against Germany.
- July 12
  - Norway annexes northern Greenland.
  - Hedley Verity establishes a new first-class cricket record by taking all ten wickets for only ten runs against Nottinghamshire on a pitch affected by a storm.
- July 17 – Altona Bloody Sunday: In Altona, Germany, a bloody clash with heavy police involvement occurs when Nazi marchers enter a working class area with many communist supporters; 18 are killed.
- July 20 – The Preußenschlag in Germany. The political coup gives Franz von Papen control of Prussia, the most powerful state in Germany, and is a major blow to German democracy.
- July 21 – The British Empire Economic Conference opens in Ottawa, Canada.
- July 30
  - The 1932 Summer Olympics open in Los Angeles.
  - Walt Disney's Flowers and Trees, the first animated cartoon to be presented in full Technicolor, premieres in Los Angeles. It releases in theaters, along with the film version of Eugene O'Neill's Strange Interlude (starring Norma Shearer and Clark Gable); Flowers and Trees goes on to win the first Academy Award for Best Animated Short.
- July 31 – July 1932 German federal election sees the Nazis become the largest party in the Reichstag, winning 37% of the vote.

=== August ===
- August – A farmers' revolt begins in the Midwestern United States.
- August 1
  - The second International Polar Year, an international scientific collaboration, begins.
  - Forrest Mars produces the first Mars bar in his Slough factory in the UK.
- August 2 – The first positron is discovered by Carl D. Anderson.
- August 5 – Hitler meets with Schleicher and reneges on the "gentlemen's agreement", demanding that he be appointed Chancellor. Schleicher agrees to support Hitler as Chancellor provided that he can remain minister of defense. Schleicher sets up a meeting between Hindenburg and Hitler on August 13 to discuss Hitler's possible appointment as Chancellor.
- August 6
  - The first Venice Film Festival is held.
  - In Germany, the world's first Autobahn is opened by Konrad Adenauer (Bundesautobahn 555).
  - Carl Gustaf Ekman resigns as Prime Minister of Sweden and is replaced by his Minister of Finance Felix Hamrin.
- August 9 – In Germany:
  - The Papen government, which likes to take a tough "law and order" stance, passes via Article 48 a law prescribing the death penalty for a variety of offenses and with the court system simplified so that the courts can hand down as many death sentences as possible.
  - Potempa Murder of 1932: In the eastern town of Potempa, five Nazi "Brownshirts" break into the house of Konrad Pietrzuch, a Communist miner, and proceed to castrate and beat him to death in front of his mother.
- August 10 – A 5.1 kg chondrite-type meteorite breaks into fragments and strikes earth near the town of Archie, Missouri, United States.
- August 11 – To celebrate Constitution Day in Germany, Chancellor Franz von Papen and his interior minister Baron Wilhelm von Gayl present proposed amendments to the Weimar constitution for a "New State" to deal with the problems besetting Germany.
- August 13 – Hitler meets President von Hindenburg and asks to be appointed as Chancellor. Hindenburg refuses under the grounds that Hitler is not qualified to be Chancellor and asks him instead to serve as Vice-Chancellor in Papen's government. Hitler announces his "all or nothing" strategy in which he will oppose any government not headed by himself and will accept no office other than Chancellor.
- August 18 – Auguste Piccard reaches an altitude of 16,197 m (53,140 ft) with a hot air balloon.
- August 18–19 – Scottish aviator Jim Mollison becomes the first pilot to make an East-to-West solo transatlantic flight, from Portmarnock, County Dublin, Ireland to RCAF Station Pennfield Ridge, New Brunswick, Canada, in his de Havilland Puss Moth high-wing monoplane The Heart's Content.
- August 20 – The Ottawa conference ends with the adoption of Imperial Preference tariff, turning the British Empire into one economic zone with a series of tariffs meant to exclude non-empire states from competing within the markets of Britain; the Dominions; and the rest of the empire.
- August 22 – Potempa murder: The five SA men involved in the torture and murder of Konrad Pietrzuch are quickly convicted and sentenced to death under the new law introduced by the Papen government. The Potempa case becomes a cause célèbre in Germany, where some maintain the death sentences are appropriate given the brutality of the torture and murder, whilst Nazis demonstrate for amnesty for the "Potempa five" on the grounds they are patriotic heroes, justified in killing the Communist Pietrzuch, and should not be executed. Hitler sends a telegram congratulating the five and they are released from jail in 1933 after he becomes Chancellor of Germany.
- August 23 – The Panama Civil Aviation Authority is established.
- August 30 – Hermann Göring is elected as Speaker of the German Reichstag.
- August 31 – A total solar eclipse is visible from northern Canada through northeastern Vermont, New Hampshire, southwestern Maine and the Capes of Massachusetts.

=== September ===
- September 2 – Despite the court's sentence of death against the "Potempa five", Chancellor von Papen in his capacity as Reich Commissioner of Prussia refuses to have them executed under the grounds that they were not aware of the emergency law at the time they committed the murder, but in reality because he is still hoping for Nazi support for his government.
- September 9
  - The Cortes Generales (Parliament) of the Second Spanish Republic approves the Statute of Autonomy of Catalonia which grants full autonomy for Catalonia for the first time in modern history.
  - Beginning of the Chaco War between Paraguay and Bolivia because of delimitation problems and others.
- September 10 – The IND Eighth Avenue Line, at this time the world's longest subway line (31 miles (50 km)), begins operation in Manhattan.
- September 11
  - Canadian operations end on the International Railway (New York–Ontario).
  - A bronze statue of Youssef Bey Karam is erected in his memory outside the Cathedral of Saint Georges, Ehden in Lebanon.
- September 12 – The very unpopular Papen government in Germany is defeated on a massive motion of no-confidence in the Reichstag. With the exceptions of the German People's Party and the German National People's Party, every party in the Reichstag votes for the no-confidence motion. Papen has Hindenburg dissolve the Reichstag for new elections in November.
- September 17
  - A speech by Laureano Gómez leads to the escalation of the Leticia Incident between Colombia and Peru.
  - Start of the Han–Liu War over Shandong.
- September 20 – Mahatma Gandhi begins a hunger strike in Poona prison, India.
- September 22 – Soviet famine of 1932–33 begins; millions starve to death as a result of forced collectivization and as part of the government's effort to break rural resistance to its policies. The Soviet regime denies the famine and allows the deaths.
- September 23 – The Kingdom of Hejaz and Nejd is proclaimed the Kingdom of Saudi Arabia, concluding the country's unification under the rule of King Abdulaziz.
- September 24 – After his party's victory in the election to the Swedish Riksdag's second chamber, Social Democrat Per Albin Hansson becomes the new prime minister of Sweden, after Felix Hamrin.
- September 27 – Ryutin Affair at its height in the Soviet Union. The Politburo meets and condemns the so-called "Ryutin Platform" and agrees to expel those associated with it from the Communist Party, but refuses Stalin's request to execute those associated with the Platform.
- September 28 – The court of Helsinki sentences Vilho Kallio, Ville Saari and Ida Maria Viden to prison for the Tattarisuo mutilation case.

=== October ===
- October – Hergé's Tintin in America (Tintin en Amérique) concludes serial publication and is issued in book format (in black and white) in Belgium.
- October 1 – Gyula Gömbös becomes Prime Minister of Hungary, the first time a member of the radical right has become the country's head of government.
- October 3 – Iraq becomes an independent kingdom under Faisal, ending the British mandate.
- October 15 – Tata Airlines (later to become Air India) makes its first flight.
- October 19 – Prince Gustav Adolf of Sweden marries Princess Sibylla of Saxe-Coburg and Gotha.
- October 25 – George Lansbury becomes the leader of the opposition British Labour Party.

=== November ===
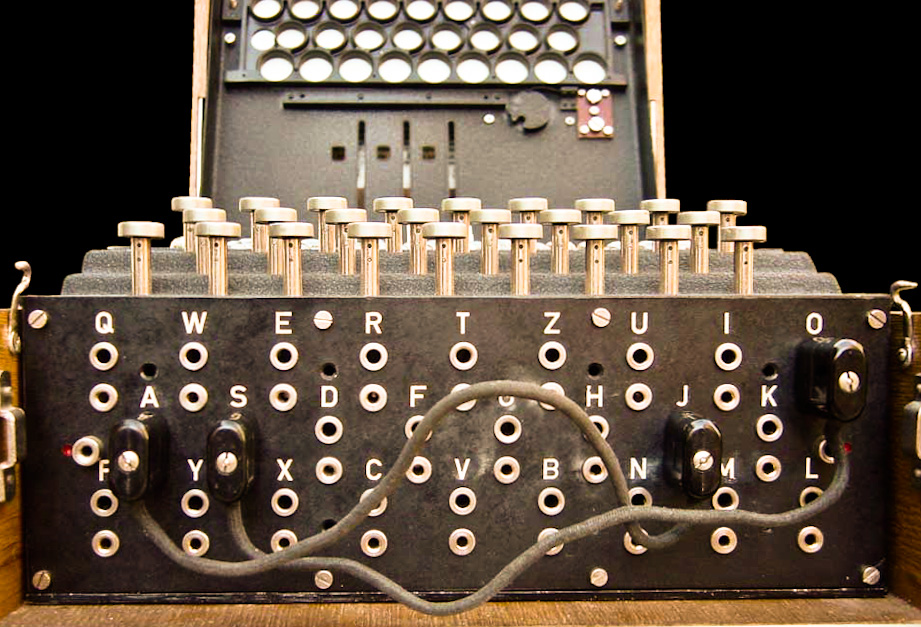
The Cipher Bureau (Poland) breaks the German Enigma cipher and overcomes the ever-growing structural and operating complexities of the evolving Enigma with plugboard, the main German cipher device during World War II.

- November 1 – The Kennedy–Thorndike experiment is published, showing that measured time as well as length is affected by motion, in accordance with the theory of special relativity.
- November 2 – The Emu War, a nuisance wildlife management military operation, begins in Australia.
- November 3 – Strike by transport workers in Berlin. The Nazis and the Communists both co-operate in support of the strike. The Nazi-Communist co-operation damages the Nazis at the upcoming election with many right-wing voters switching back to the German National People's Party.
- November 6 – November 1932 German federal election: The Nazis remain the largest party in the Reichstag but their share of the seats drops from 37% to 32%. The Communists (KPD) are the second largest party. This will be the last free election for the whole of Germany until 1990.
- November 7 – Buck Rogers in the 25th Century debuts on American radio. It is the first science fiction program on radio.
- November 8 – 1932 United States presidential election: Democratic governor of New York Franklin D. Roosevelt defeats incumbent Republican president Herbert Hoover in a landslide victory, having promised a New Deal and repeal of Prohibition.
- November 9
  - A hurricane and huge waves kill about 2,500 in Santa Cruz del Sur in the worst natural disaster in Cuban history.
  - Geneva massacre: Military of Switzerland fire on a socialist anti-fascist demonstration in Geneva leaving 13 dead and 60 injured.
- November 21 – German president Hindenburg begins negotiations with Adolf Hitler about the formation of a new government.
- November 27 – The Second Eastern Women's Congress opens in Tehran, Iran.
- November 30 – The Polish Cipher Bureau breaks the German Enigma cipher.

=== December ===
- December 1 – Germany returns to the World Disarmament Conference after the other powers agree to accept gleichberechtigung "in principle". Henceforward, it is clear that Germany will be allowed to rearm beyond the limits imposed by the Treaty of Versailles.
- December 3 – Hindenburg names Kurt von Schleicher as German chancellor after he ousts Papen. Papen is deeply angry about how his former friend Schleicher has brought him down and decides that he will do anything to get back into power.
- December 4 – Chancellor Schleicher meets with Gregor Strasser and offers to appoint him Vice-Chancellor and Reich Commissioner for Prussia out of the hope that if faced with a split in the NSDAP, Hitler will support his government.
- December 5 – At a secret meeting of the Nazi leaders, Strasser urges Hitler to drop his "all or nothing" strategy and accept Schleicher's offer to have the Nazis serve in his cabinet. Hitler gives a dramatic speech saying that Schleicher's offer is not acceptable and he will stick to his "all or nothing" strategy whatever the consequences might be and wins the Nazi leadership over to his viewpoint.
- December 8 – Gregor Strasser resigns as the chief of the NSDAP's organizational department in protest against Hitler's "all or nothing" strategy.
- December 10 – The Emu War in Australia ends in failure.
- December 12 – Japan and the Soviet Union reform their diplomatic connections.
- December 19 – BBC World Service begins broadcasting as the BBC Empire Service using a shortwave radio facility at its Daventry transmitting station in England.
- December 24 – 1932 Moweaqua Coal Mine disaster
- December 25
  - The 7.6 M_{s} Changma earthquake shakes the Gansu Province in China with a maximum Mercalli intensity of X (Extreme). Two-hundred and seventy-five people are killed.
  - IG Farben files a patent application in Germany for the medical application of the first sulfonamide oral antibiotic, which will be marketed as Prontosil, following Gerhard Domagk's laboratory demonstration of its properties as an antibiotic.
  - King George V delivers the first Royal Christmas Message on the new BBC Empire Service radio from Sandringham House; the text has been written by Rudyard Kipling.
- December 27 – The Radio City Music Hall is opened in New York City.
- December 28 – The Cologne banker Kurt von Schröder, who is a close friend of Papen and a NSDAP member, meets with Adolf Hitler to tell him that Papen wants to set up a meeting to discuss how they can work together. Papen wants Nazi support to return to the Chancellorship while Hitler wants Papen to convince Hindenburg to appoint him Chancellor. Hitler agrees to meet Papen on January 3, 1933.

=== Date unknown ===
- Zero-length springs are invented, revolutionizing seismometers and gravimeters.
- British geneticist J. B. S. Haldane publishes The Causes of Evolution, unifying the findings of Mendelian genetics with those of evolutionary science.
- The heath hen becomes extinct in North America.
- Walter B. Pitkin publishes Life Begins at Forty in the United States.
- SPAR, the global retail brand, is founded in Zegwaart, Netherlands.
- Unemployment in the United States – ca. 33% – 14 million. A similar level of unemployment affects Germany. Many people in depressed countries do not receive unemployment benefit due to governments not being able to afford benefit payments.

== Births ==
=== January ===
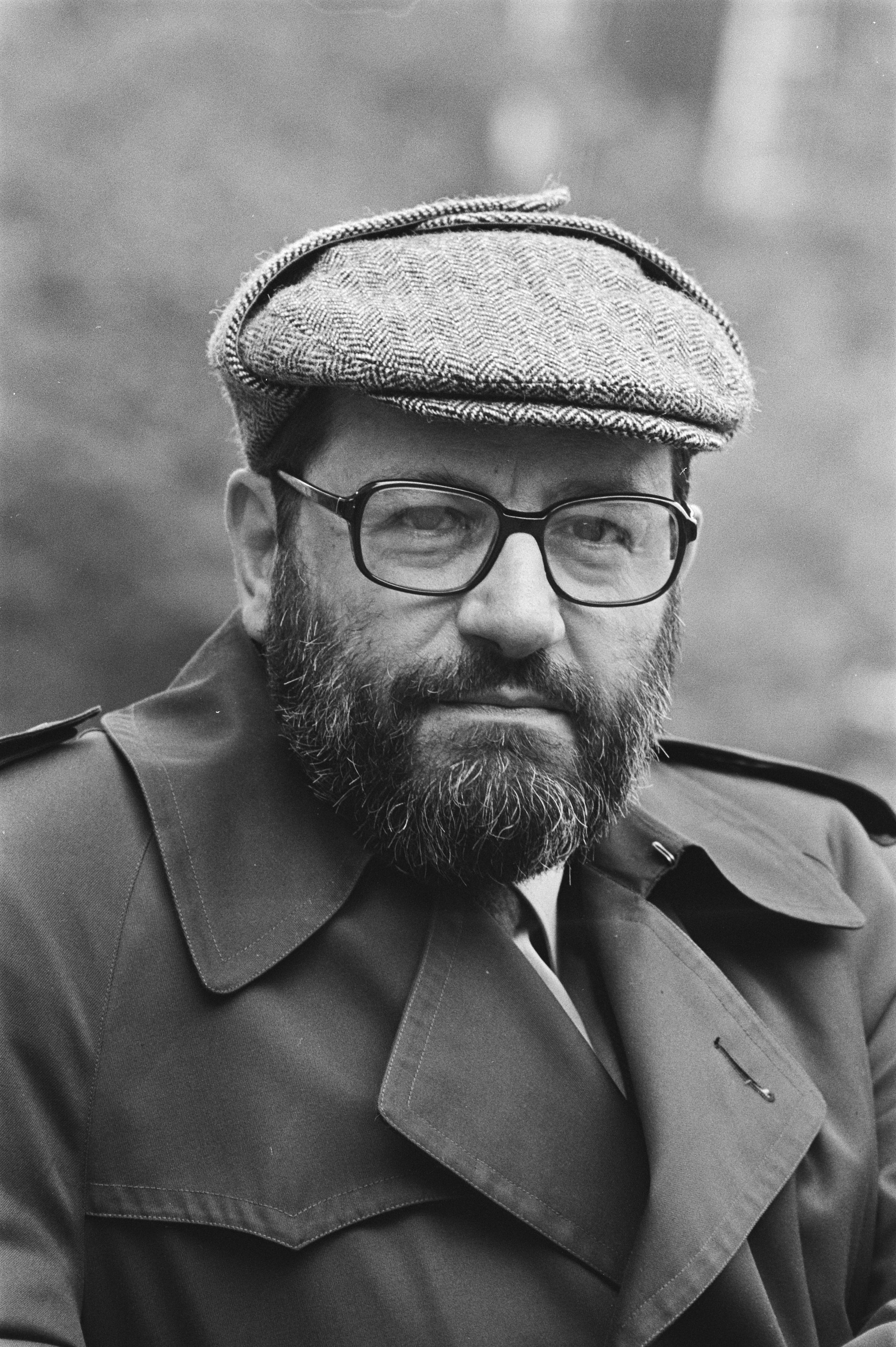
Umberto Eco

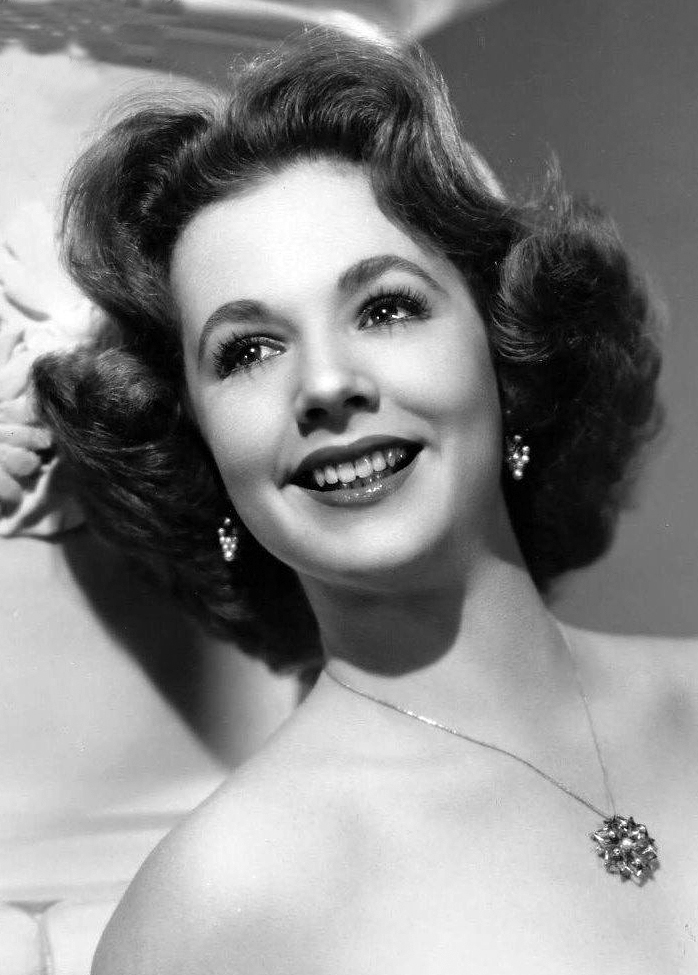
Piper Laurie

- January 3 – Dabney Coleman, American actor (d. 2024)
- January 5
  - Umberto Eco, Italian scholar and novelist (d. 2016)
  - Raisa Gorbacheva, First Lady of the Soviet Union (d. 1999)
- January 10 – József Szécsényi, Hungarian track and field athlete (d. 2017)
- January 13 – Joseph Cardinal Zen, Catholic Bishop of Hong Kong
- January 16 – Dian Fossey, American zoologist (d. 1985)
- January 17 – Sheree North, American actress and singer (d. 2005)
- January 18 – Robert Anton Wilson, American author (d. 2007)
- January 19 – Richard Lester, American film director
- January 22 – Piper Laurie, American actress (d. 2023)
- January 25 – Nikolay Anikin, Soviet cross-country skier (d. 2009)
- January 26 – Coxsone Dodd, Jamaican record producer (d. 2004)
- January 27 – Boris Shakhlin, Soviet gymnast (d. 2008)
- January 29 – Tommy Taylor, English footballer (d. 1958)
- January 30 – Kazuo Inamori, Japanese businessman (d. 2022)

=== February ===
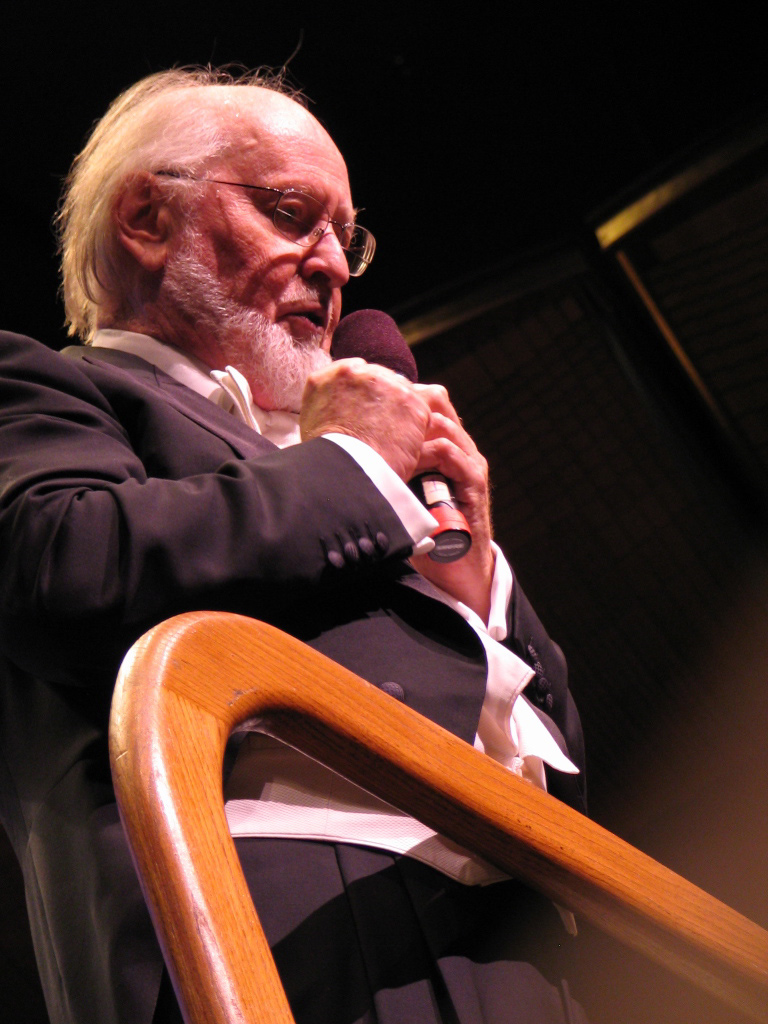
John Williams

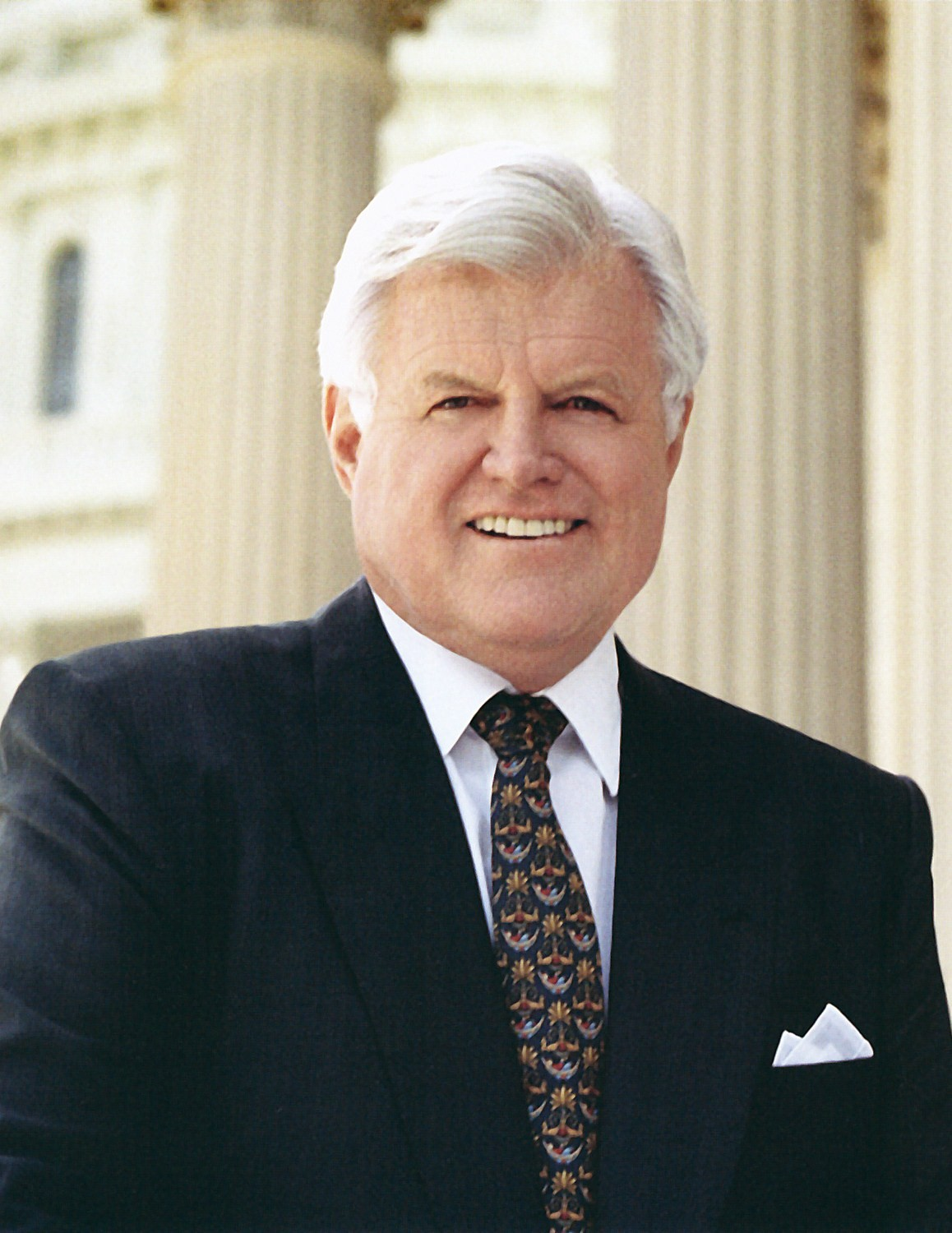
Ted Kennedy

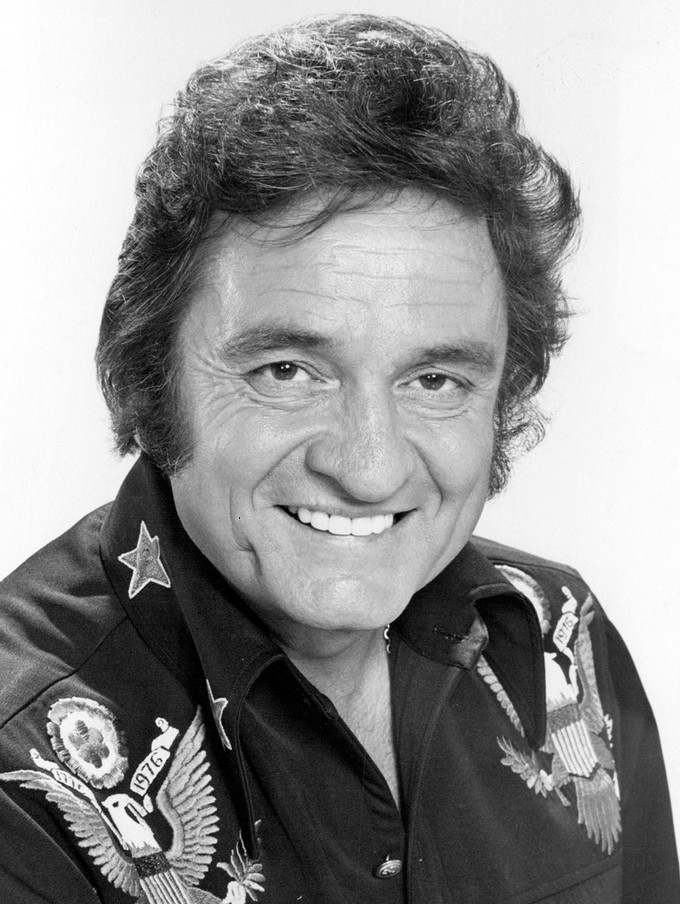
Johnny Cash

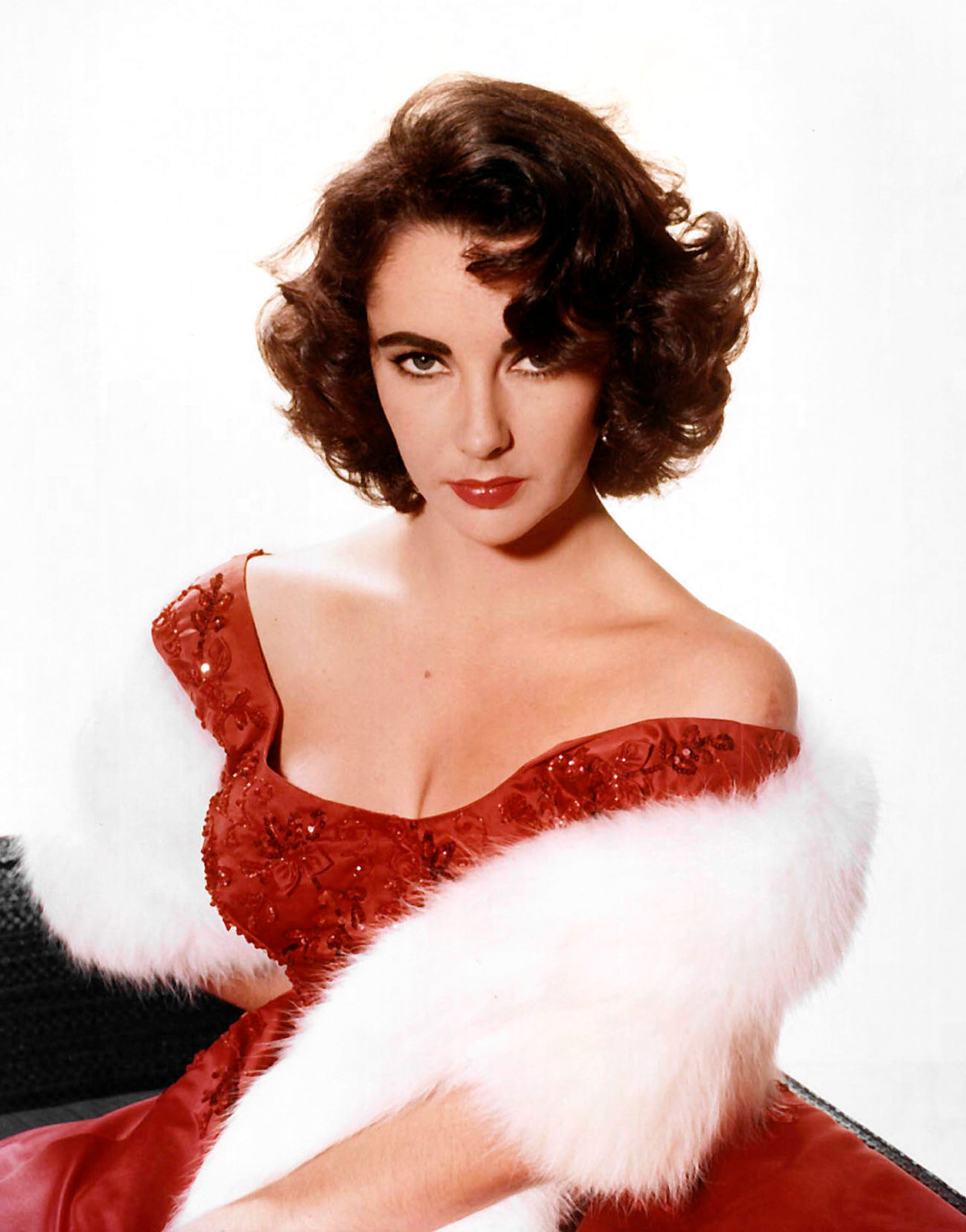
Dame Elizabeth Taylor

- February 1 – Hassan Al-Turabi, Sudanese spiritual leader (d. 2016)
- February 3 – Peggy Ann Garner, American actress (d. 1984)
- February 5 – Cesare Maldini, Italian football player and manager (d. 2016)
- February 6
  - François Truffaut, French film director (d. 1984)
  - Camilo Cienfuegos, Cuban revolutionary leader (d. 1959)
- February 7
  - Gay Talese, American author
  - Alfred Worden, American astronaut (d. 2020)
- February 8 – John Williams, American composer and conductor
- February 9 – Gerhard Richter, German painter
- February 11 – Margit Carlqvist, Swedish actress
- February 13 – Susan Oliver, American actress (d. 1990)
- February 14 – Alexander Kluge, German author and film director (d. 2026)
- February 16
  - Alhaji Ahmad Tejan Kabbah, former president of Sierra Leone (d. 2014)
  - Aharon Appelfeld, Ukrainian-born Israeli writer (d. 2018)
- February 18 – Miloš Forman, Czech-American film director (d. 2018)
- February 19 – Alberto Dines, Brazilian journalist and writer (d. 2018)
- February 22
  - Ted Kennedy, American politician (d. 2009)
  - Robert Opron, French automotive designer (d. 2021)
- February 23 – Irene Jai Narayan, Fiji politician (d. 2011)
- February 24
  - John Vernon, Canadian actor (d. 2005)
  - Michel Legrand, French composer (d. 2019)
  - M. S. Rajeswari, Indian singer (d. 2018)
- February 25
  - Augusto Polo Campos, Peruvian composer (d. 2018)
  - Faron Young, American country singer (d. 1996)
- February 26 – Johnny Cash, American country singer (d. 2003)
- February 27 – Dame Elizabeth Taylor, British-American actress (d. 2011)
- February 28 – Don Francks, Canadian actor, musician and singer (d. 2016)

=== March ===
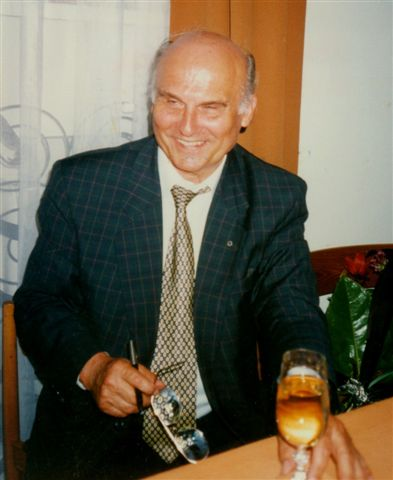
Ryszard Kapuściński

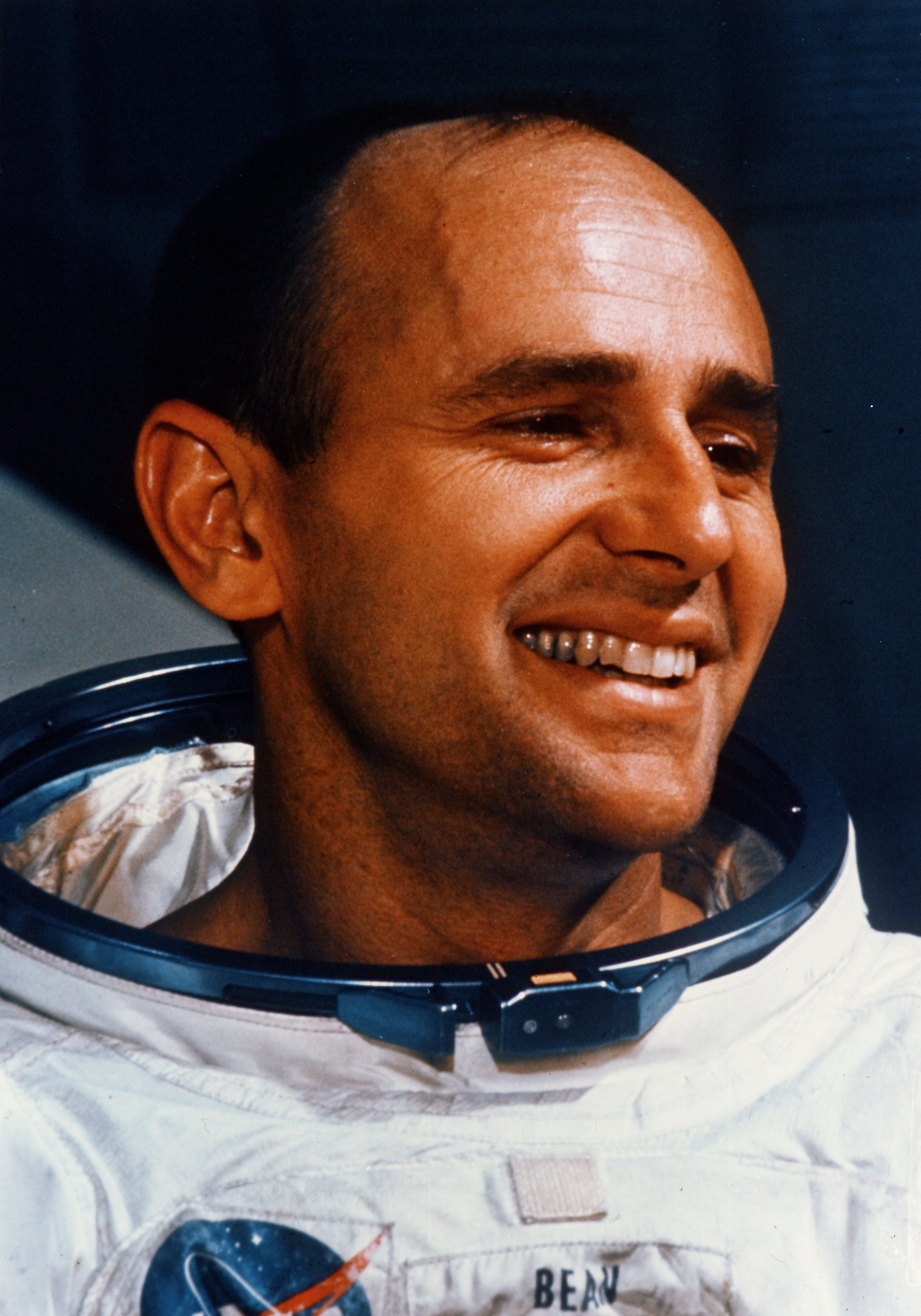
Alan Bean

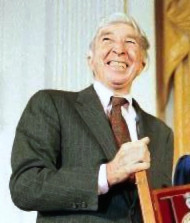
John Updike

- March 4
  - Ryszard Kapuściński, Polish journalist (d. 2007)
  - Miriam Makeba, South African singer and civil rights activist (d. 2008)
  - Efrén Echeverría, Paraguayan musician guitarist, composer, and compiler (d. 2018)
- March 6
  - Marc Bazin, 4th prime minister of Haiti (d. 2010)
  - Bronisław Geremek, Polish social historian and politician (d. 2008)
- March 7
  - Lola Beltrán, Mexican singer, actress, and television presenter (d. 1996)
  - Momoko Kōchi, Japanese actress (d. 1998)
- March 11 – Leroy Jenkins, African-American jazz musician and composer (d. 2007)
- March 12 - Andrew Young, American civil rights movement activist, Mayor of Atlanta, and ambassador to the United Nations
- March 15 – Alan Bean, American naval officer and naval aviator, aeronautical engineer, test pilot, and NASA astronaut (d. 2018)
- March 18 – John Updike, American author (d. 2009)
- March 21 – Walter Gilbert, American chemist and Nobel laureate
- March 22 – Els Borst, Dutch politician, Deputy Prime Minister of the Netherlands (1998–2002) (d. 2014)
- March 27 – Junior Parker, African-American blues musician (d. 1971)
- March 28 – Sven Lindqvist, Swedish author (d. 2019)
- March 31 – Nagisa Oshima, Japanese film director (d. 2013)

=== April ===
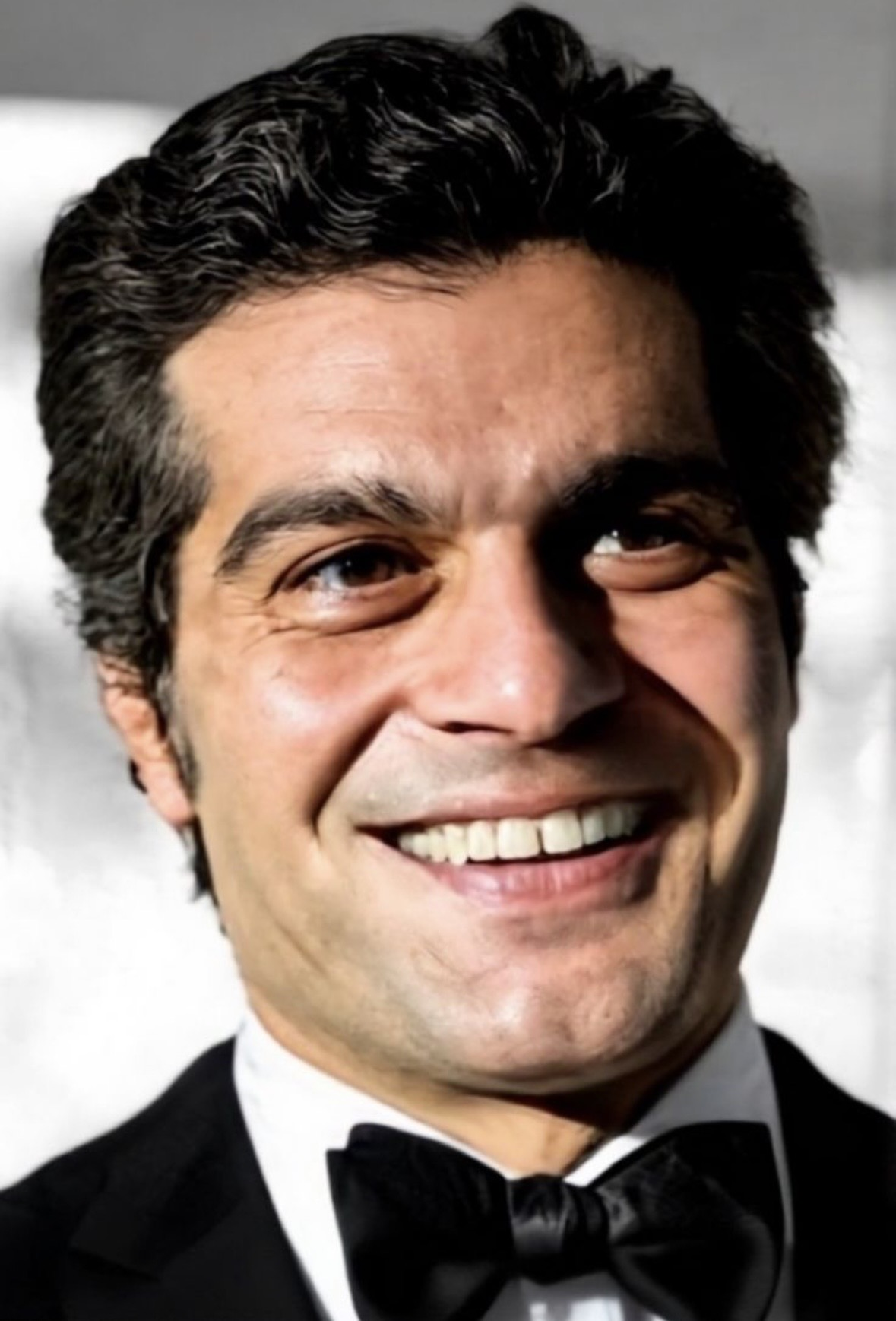
Omar Sharif

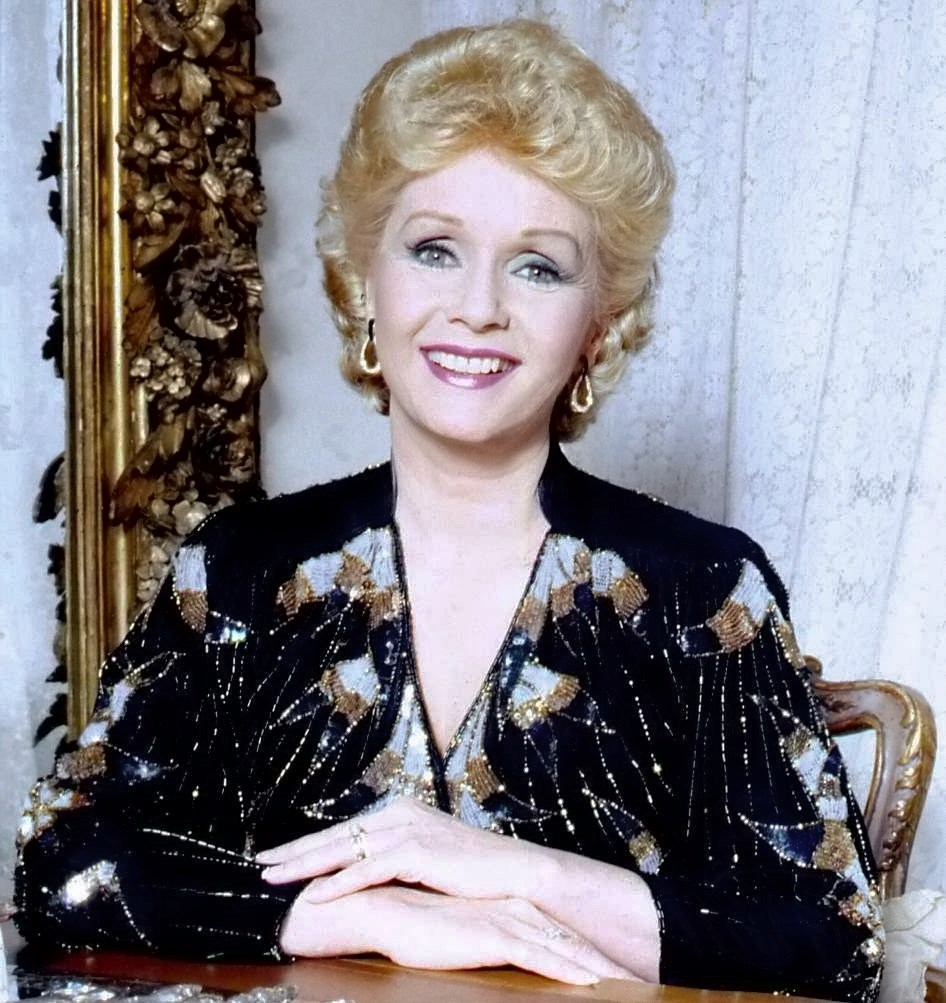
Debbie Reynolds

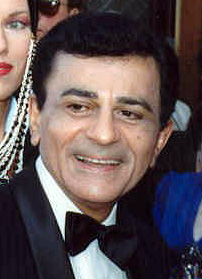
Casey Kasem

- April 1 – Debbie Reynolds, American actress, singer and dancer (d. 2016)
- April 4
  - Anthony Perkins, American actor (d. 1992)
  - Andrei Tarkovsky, Soviet and Russian film director (d. 1986)
- April 8
  - József Antall, Hungarian historian, librarian, political figure and teacher, 53rd prime minister of Hungary (d. 1993)
  - Sultan Iskandar of Johor, 8th Yang di-Pertuan Agong of Malaysia (d. 2010)
- April 9 – Carl Perkins, American musician (d. 1998)
- April 10
  - Kishori Amonkar, Indian vocalist (d. 2017)
  - Delphine Seyrig, Lebanese-born French actress (d. 1990)
  - Omar Sharif, Egyptian actor (d. 2015)
- April 11 – Joel Grey, American actor, singer and dancer
- April 12
  - Jean-Pierre Marielle, French actor (d. 2019)
  - Lakshman Kadirgamar, Sri Lankan politician (d. 2005)
  - Tiny Tim, American musician (d. 1996)
- April 13
  - Barney Simon, South African writer, playwright and director (d. 1995)
  - Orlando Letelier, Chilean economist, politician and diplomat (d. 1976)
- April 14 – Loretta Lynn, American country singer-songwriter (d. 2022)
- April 16
  - Qahhor Mahkamov, Tajik politician, 1st president of Tajikistan (d. 2016)
  - Pierre Milza, French historian (d. 2018)
- April 21 – Elaine May, American comedian, film director, screenwriter, playwright, and actress
- April 24 – Vladimir Yengibaryan, Armenian amateur light-welterweight boxer (d. 2013)
- April 25
  - Nikolai Kardashev, Soviet and Russian astrophysicist (d. 2019)
  - Meadowlark Lemon, American basketball player, 22 years for the Harlem Globetrotters (d. 2015)
- April 26
  - Michael Smith, English-born chemist and Nobel laureate (d. 2000)
  - Francis Lai, French composer (d. 2018)
- April 27
  - Anouk Aimée, French actress (d. 2024)
  - Pik Botha, South African politician (d. 2018)
  - Casey Kasem, American disc jockey and voice actor (d. 2014)
  - Gian-Carlo Rota, Italian-born mathematician and philosopher (d. 1999)
- April 29 – Wilson Ndolo Ayah, Kenyan politician (d. 2016)

=== May ===
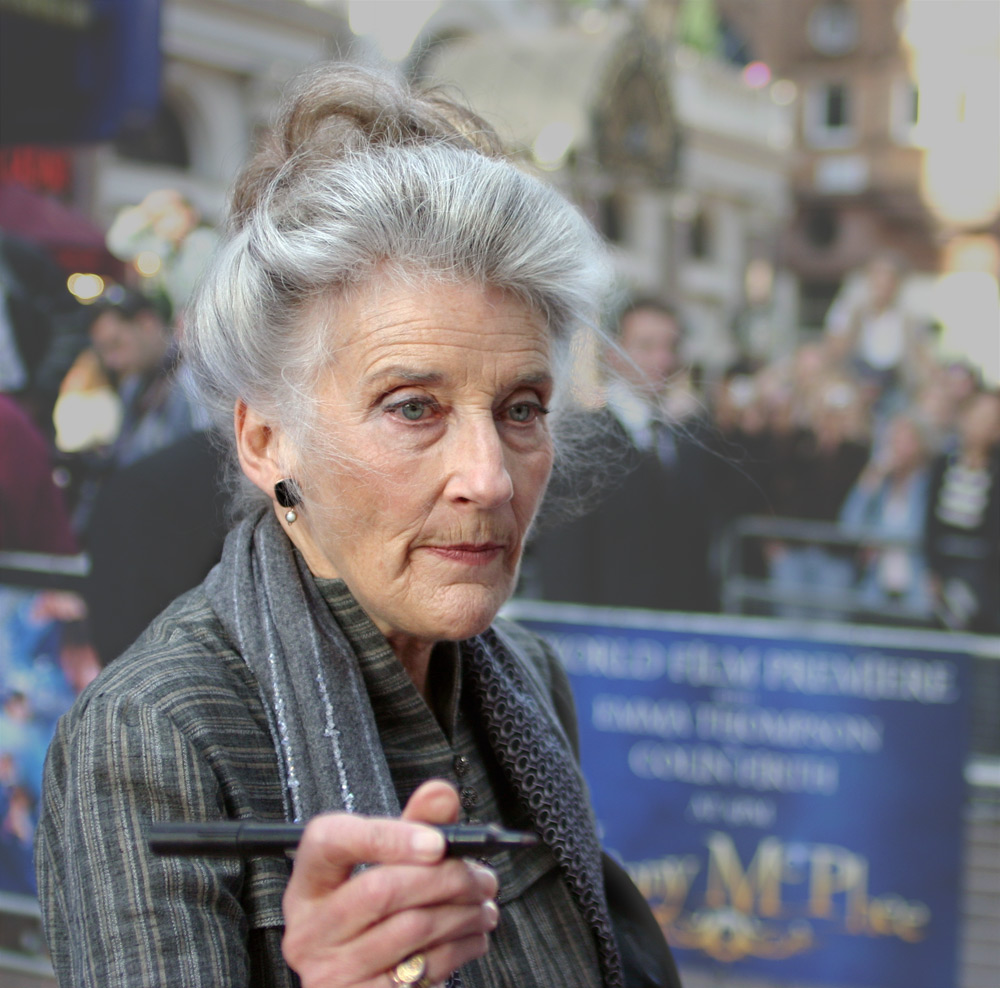
Phyllida Law

- May 6
  - Ahmet Haxhiu, Albanian political activist (d. 1994)
  - Antal Bolvári, Hungarian water polo player (d. 2019)
- May 7 – Fufi Santori, Puerto Rican basketball player and writer (d. 2018)
- May 8
  - Phyllida Law, Scottish actress (d. 2026)
  - Sonny Liston, American boxer (d. 1970)
- May 9 – Geraldine McEwan, English actress (d. 2015)
- May 11
  - Fabio Mamerto Rivas Santos, Dominican bishop (d. 2018)
  - Valentino, Italian fashion designer (d. 2026)
- May 17 – Miloslav Vlk, Czech cardinal and archbishop (d. 2017)
- May 19 – Alma Cogan, English singer (d. 1966)
- May 21 – Leonidas Vasilikopoulos, Greek admiral and intelligence chief (d. 2014)
- May 24 – Arnold Wesker, British playwright (d. 2016)
- May 25 – K. C. Jones, American basketball player and coach (d. 2020)
- May 27 – José Varacka, Argentine footballer and coach (d. 2018)
- May 29 – Paul R. Ehrlich, American biologist and author (d. 2026)
- May 30
  - Abdul Ghani Gilong, Malaysian politician (d. 2021)
  - Jose Melo, Filipino lawyer and jurist (d. 2020)

=== June ===
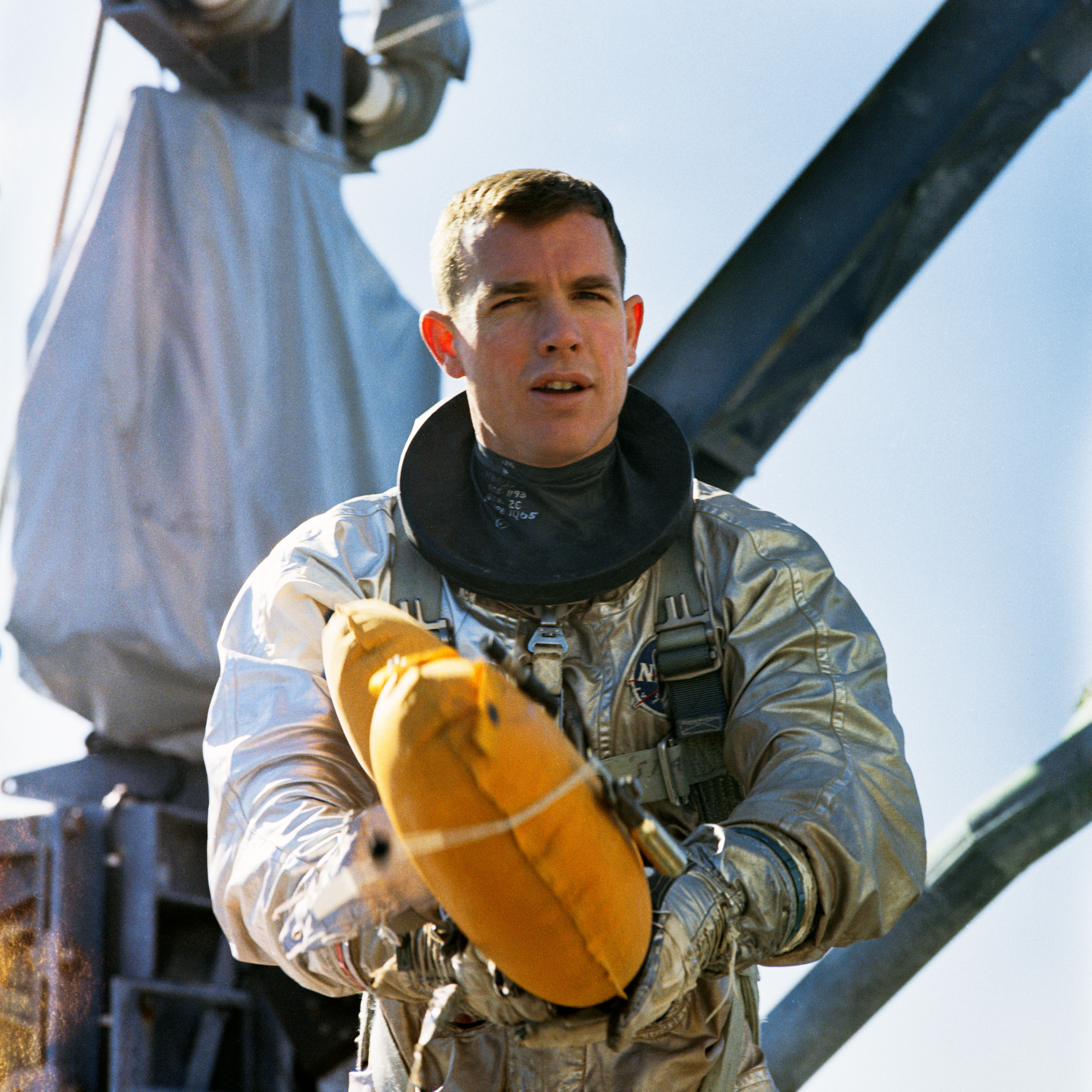
David Scott

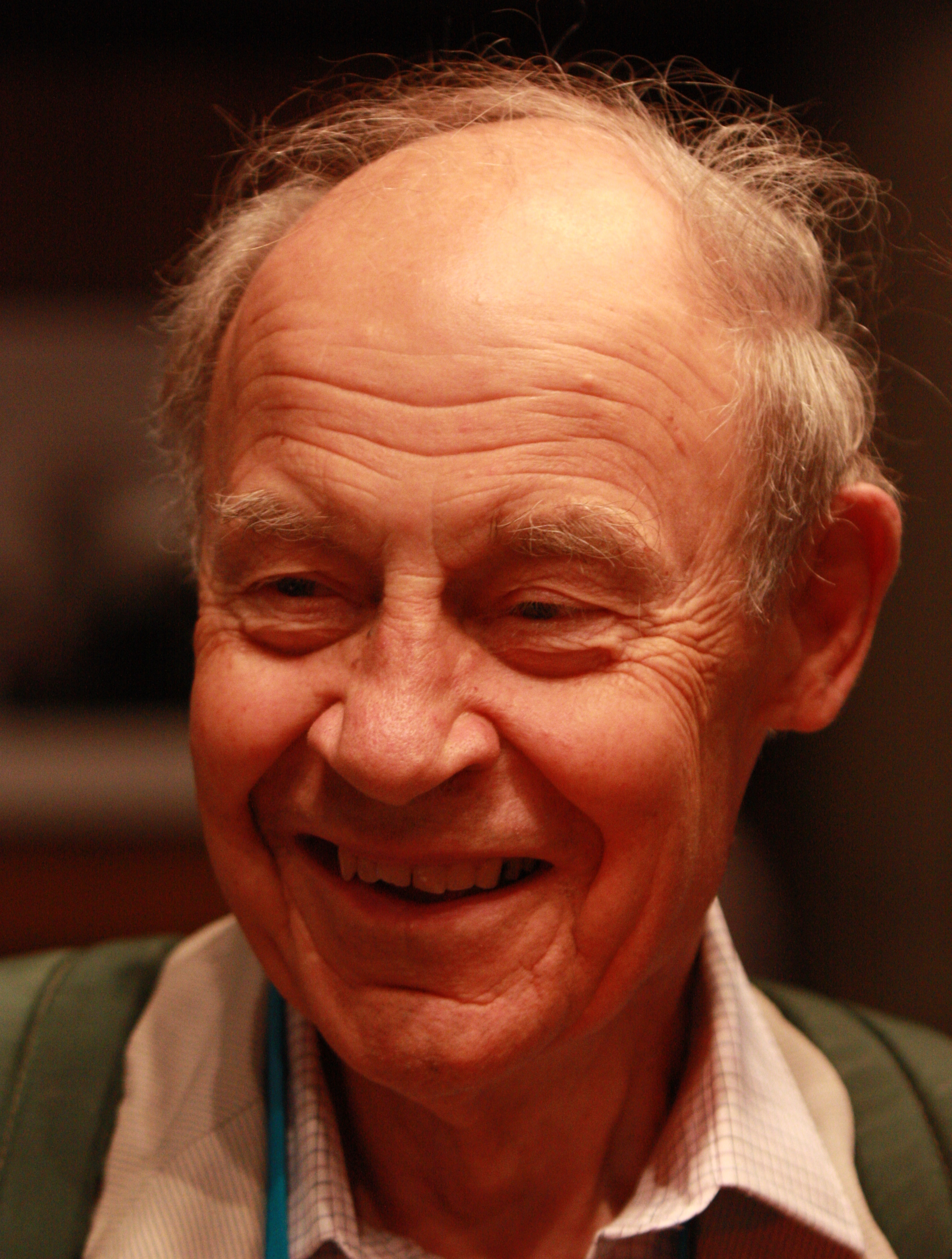
Dudley R. Herschbach

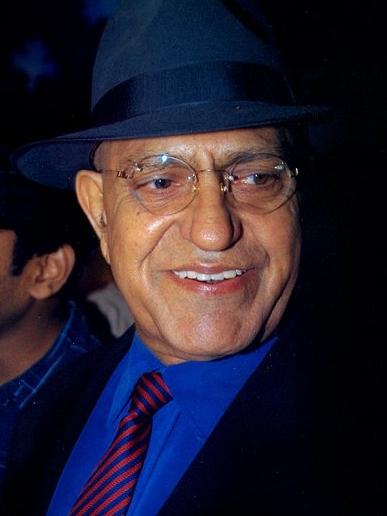
Amrish Puri

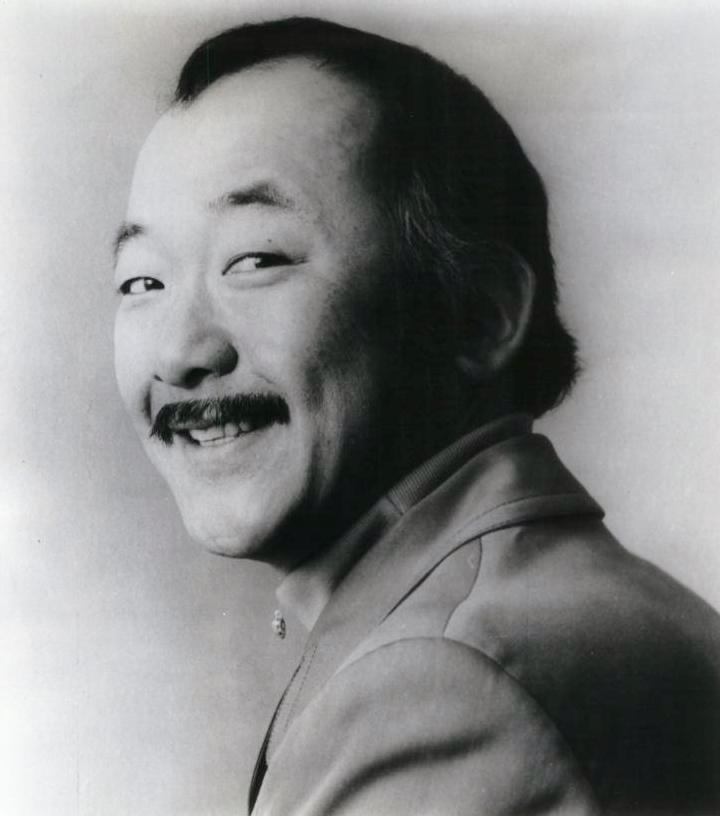
Pat Morita

- June 4 – Maurice Shadbolt, New Zealand writer (d. 2004)
- June 5 – Christy Brown, Irish writer and painter (d. 1981)
- June 6 – David Scott, American astronaut
- June 10 – Branko Lustig, Croatian film producer (d. 2019)
- June 11 – Athol Fugard, South African author and dramatist (d. 2025)
- June 12
  - Mimi Coertse, South African opera soprano (d. 2026)
  - Mamo Wolde, Ethiopian Olympic athlete (d. 2002)
- June 13 – Rainer K. Sachs, German-American physicist and biologist (d. 2024)
- June 17 – Vesna Krmpotić, Croatian writer and translator (d. 2018)
- June 18 – Dudley R. Herschbach, American chemist and Nobel laureate
- June 20 – Robert Rozhdestvensky, Soviet Poet (d. 1994)
- June 21
  - Ilka Soares, Brazilian actress (d. 2022)
  - Lalo Schifrin, Argentine pianist, composer, arranger and conductor (d. 2025)
- June 22
  - Soraya Esfandiary-Bakhtiari, Princess of Iran; wife of Mohammad Reza Pahlavi (d. 2001)
  - Amrish Puri, Indian actor (d. 2005)
  - Prunella Scales, English actress (d. 2025)
- June 23 – Eloisa Cianni, Italian actress, model and beauty pageant titleholder (d. 2022)
- June 24
  - Margit Korondi, Hungarian gymnast (d. 2022)
  - David McTaggart, Canadian environmental campaigner (d. 2001)
- June 25 – Peter Blake, English artist
- June 26 – Marguerite Pindling, Governor-General of the Bahamas
- June 27 – Anna Moffo, American operatic soprano (d. 2006)
- June 28 – Pat Morita, Asian-American actor (d. 2005)

=== July ===
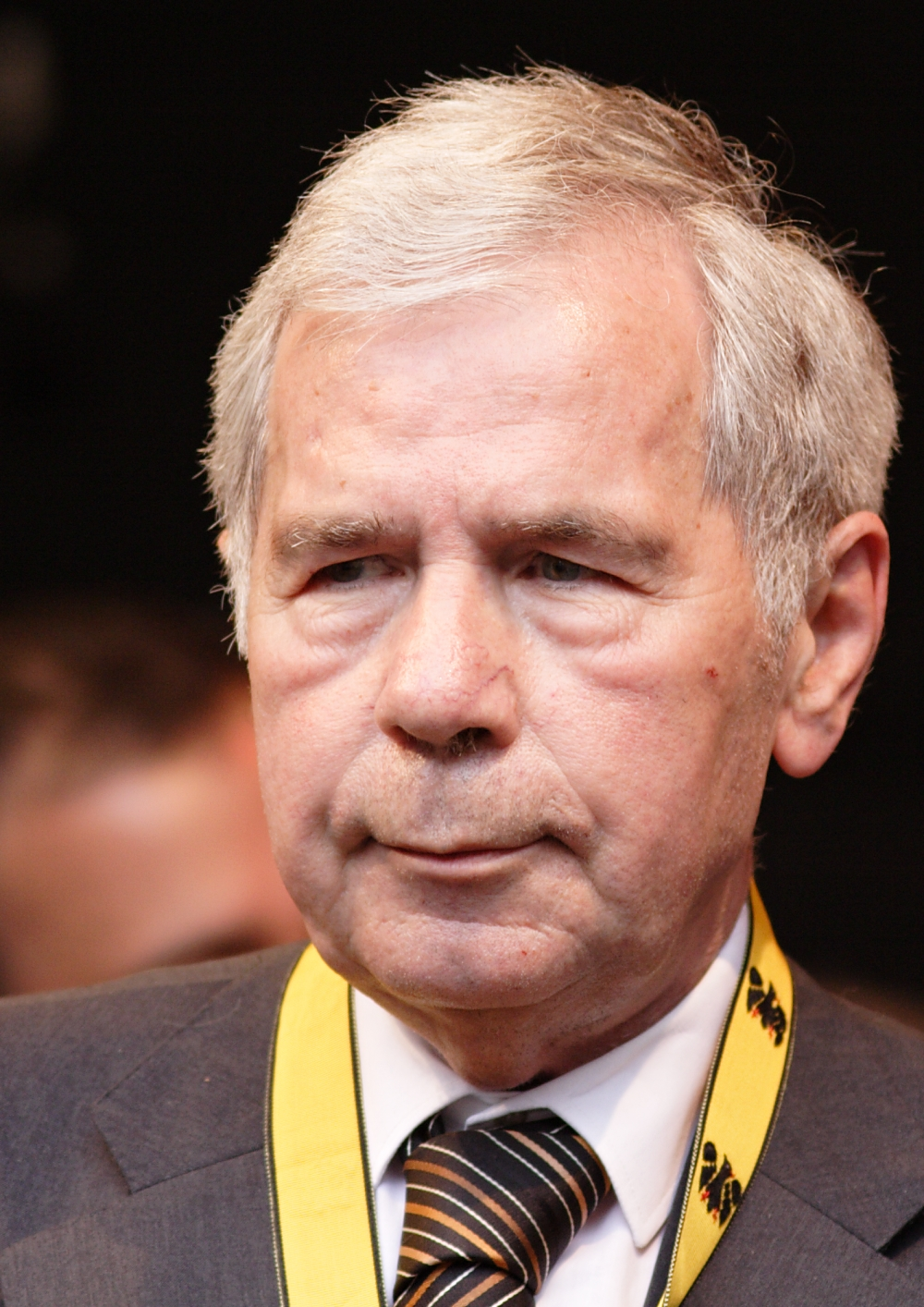
Gyula Horn

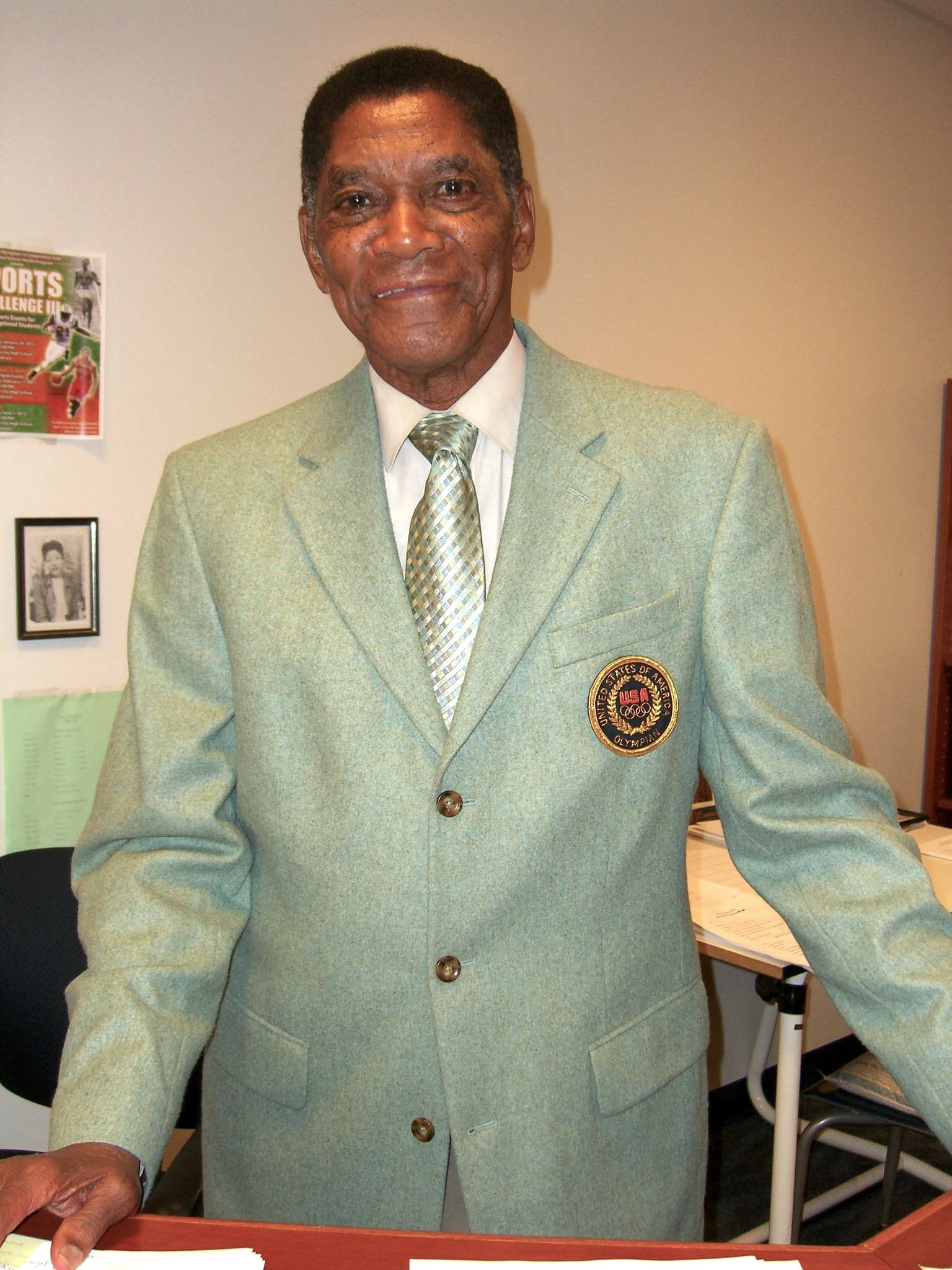
Otis Davis

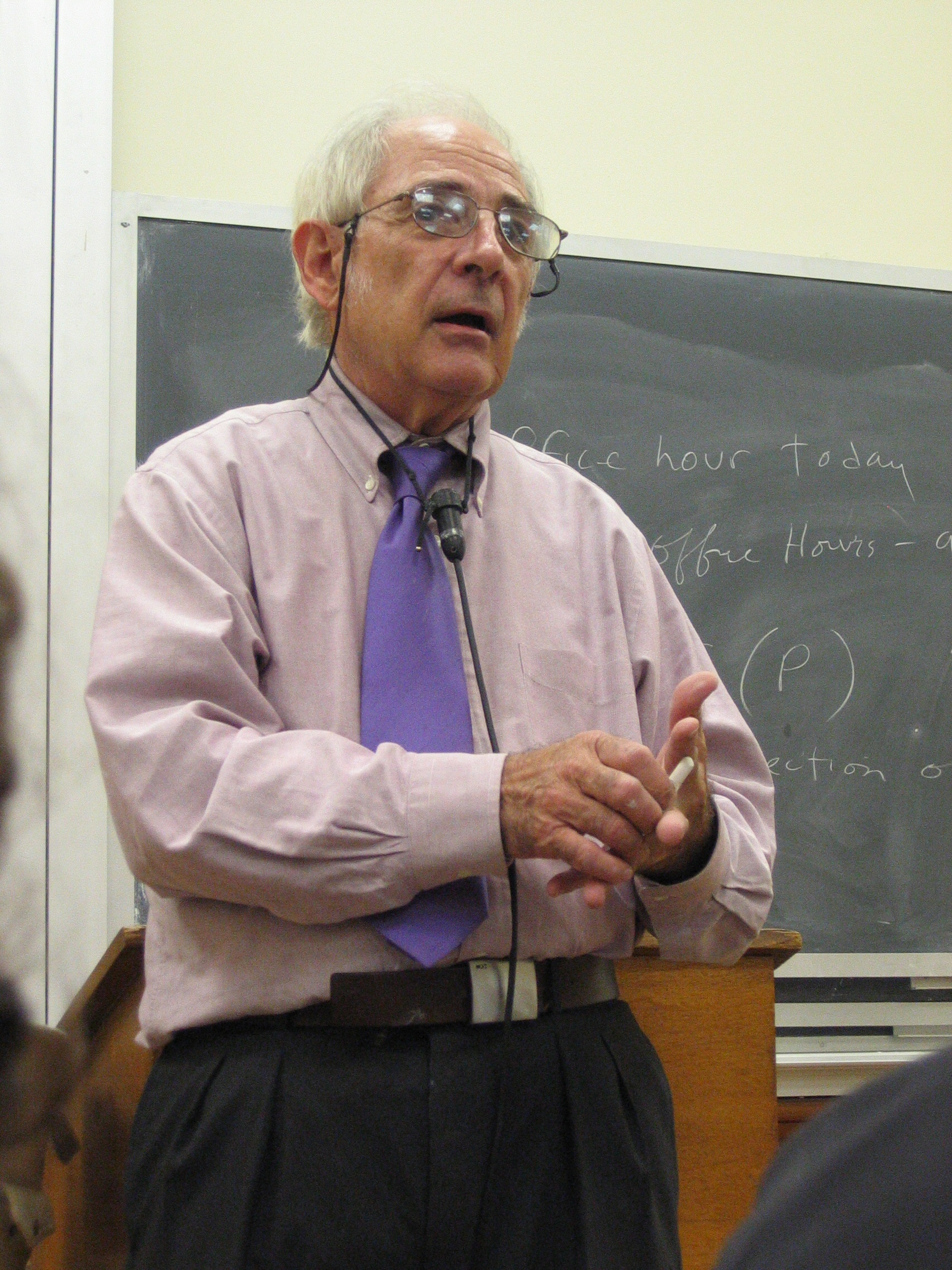
John Searle

- July 1
  - Sonny Caldinez, Trinidadian actor and former professional wrestler (d. 2022)
  - Pablo Eisenberg, French-born American academic and tennis player (d. 2022)
  - Adam Harasiewicz, Polish concert pianist
- July 2 – Waldemar Matuška, Czech singer (d. 2009)
- July 4 – Otis Young, African-American actor (d. 2001)
- July 5
  - Gyula Horn, Prime Minister of Hungary (d. 2013)
  - Kazimiera Utrata, Polish actress (d. 2018)
- July 6 – Herman Hertzberger, Dutch architect and professor
- July 9 – Donald Rumsfeld, U.S. Secretary of Defense (d. 2021)
- July 10
  - Carlo Maria Abate, Italian racing driver (d. 2019)
  - János Bódi, Hungarian modern pentathlete
- July 11 – Hans van Manen, Dutch ballet dancer, choreographer and photographer (d. 2025)
- July 12
  - Rene Goulet, Canadian professional wrestler (d. 2019)
  - Otis Davis, American athlete (d. 2024)
  - Eddy Wally, Belgian singer (d. 2016)
- July 13
  - Per Nørgård, Danish composer (d. 2025)
  - Khalil Taha, Lebanese wrestler (d. 2020)
- July 14 – Helga Liné, German-born Portuguese-Spanish film actress and circus acrobat
- July 17 – Quino, Argentine cartoonist (d. 2020)
- July 20
  - Nam June Paik, Korean-born American artist (d. 2006)
  - Otto Schily, German politician
- July 22
  - Jean Barthe, French rugby league and rugby union player (d. 2017)
  - Tom Robbins, American novelist (d. 2025)
- July 23
  - Jorge Arvizu, Mexican voice actor (d. 2014)
  - Oswaldo Loureiro, Brazilian actor (d. 2018)
- July 25
  - Kenneth Fernando, Sri Lankan Anglican clergyman, bishop of Colombo (d. 2025)
  - Paul J. Weitz, American astronaut (d. 2017)
- July 28 – Carlos Alberto Brilhante Ustra, Brazilian colonel (d. 2015)
- July 29 – Nancy Landon Kassebaum Baker, U.S. senator (d. 2026)
- July 30 – Edd Byrnes, American actor (d. 2020)
- July 31 – John Searle, American philosopher (d. 2025)

=== August ===
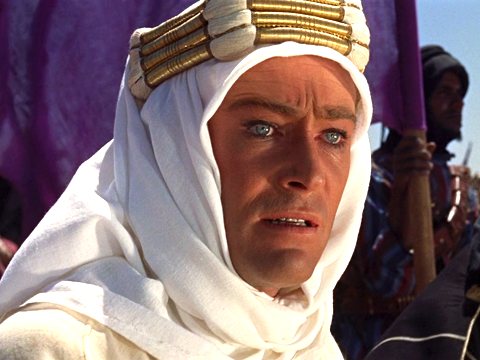
Peter O'Toole

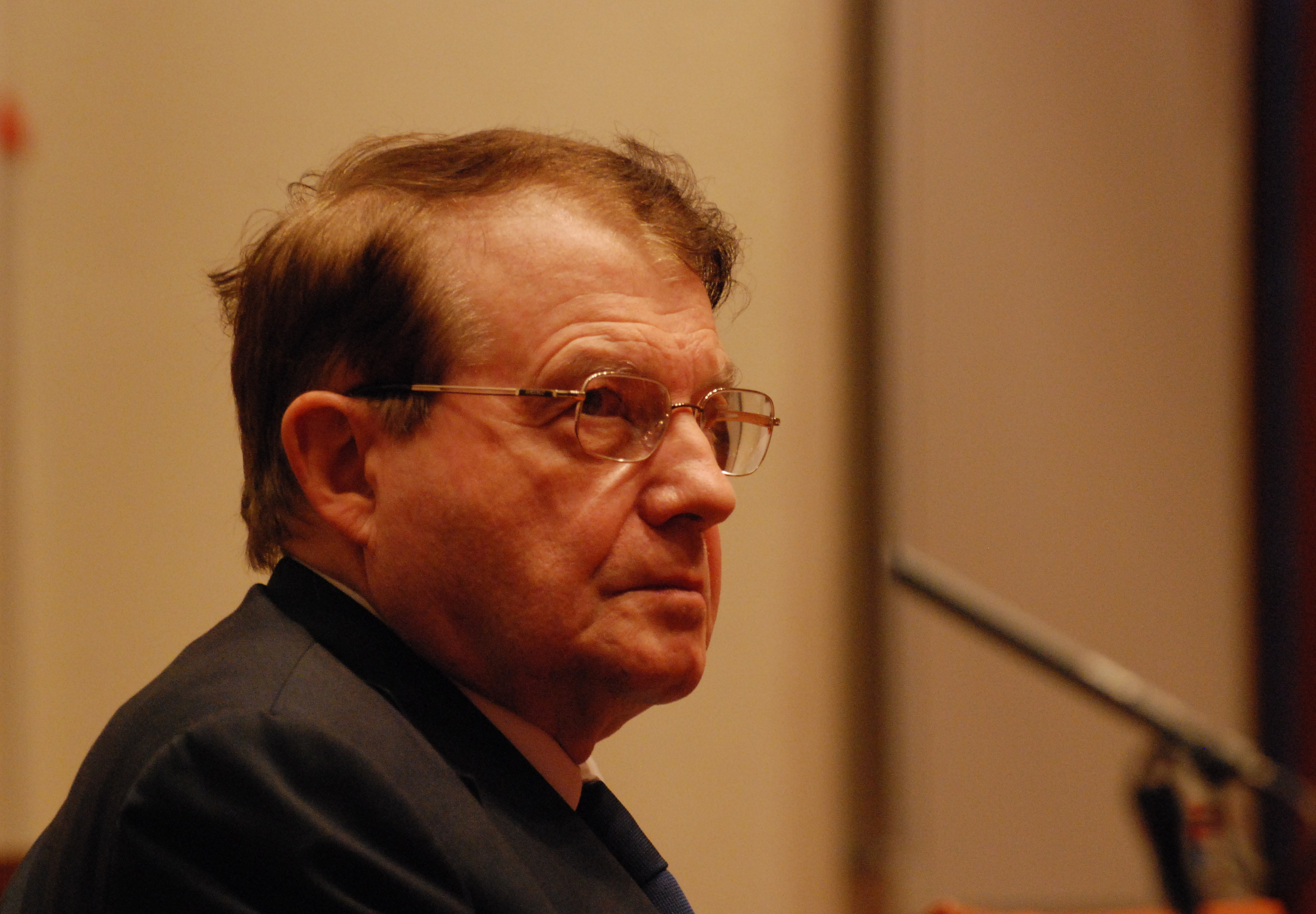
Luc Montagnier

- August 1
  - Meir Kahane, American-born Israeli rabbi and ultra-nationalist (d. 1990)
  - Meena Kumari, Indian actress (d. 1972)
- August 2
  - Lamar Hunt, American sportsman (d. 2006)
  - Peter O'Toole, British-Irish actor (d. 2013)
- August 4 – Frances Allen, American computer scientist (d. 2020)
- August 5
  - Jameson Mbilini Dlamini, 7th prime minister of Swaziland (d. 2008)
  - Vladimir Fedoseyev, Soviet and Russian conductor, accordionist, teacher
- August 6 – Howard Hodgkin, British painter and print-maker (d. 2017)
- August 7 – Abebe Bikila, Ethiopian long-distance runner (d. 1973)
- August 8 – Mel Tillis, American country singer (d. 2017)
- August 9 – Anand Panyarachun, 18th prime minister of Thailand
- August 11 – Fernando Arrabal, Spanish writer
- August 12
  - Dallin H. Oaks 18th President of The Church of Jesus Christ of Latter-day Saints
  - Sirikit, Queen mother of Thailand (from 1950–2025) (d. 2025)
- August 17
  - V. S. Naipaul, West Indian-born writer and Nobel laureate (d. 2018)
  - Jean-Jacques Sempé, French cartoonist (d. 2022)
- August 18 – Luc Montagnier, French virologist and Nobel Prize winner (d. 2022)
- August 19 – Banharn Silpa-archa, 32nd prime minister of Thailand (d. 2016)
- August 20 – Vasily Aksyonov, Russian writer (d. 2009)
- August 21 – Melvin Van Peebles, African-American actor, filmmaker, playwright, novelist and composer (d. 2021)
- August 23 – Houari Boumediene, 2nd president of Algeria (d. 1978)
- August 24 – W. Morgan Sheppard, English actor (d. 2019)
- August 25 – Luis Félix López, Ecuadorian doctor, writer and politician (d. 2008)
- August 27
  - Mohamed Hamri, Moroccan artist (d. 2000)
  - Saye Zerbo, 3rd president and 4th prime minister of Burkina Faso (d. 2013)
- August 28 – Raul Cortez, Brazilian actor (d. 2006)
- August 29 – Shen Chun-shan, Taiwanese academic (d. 2018)

=== September ===
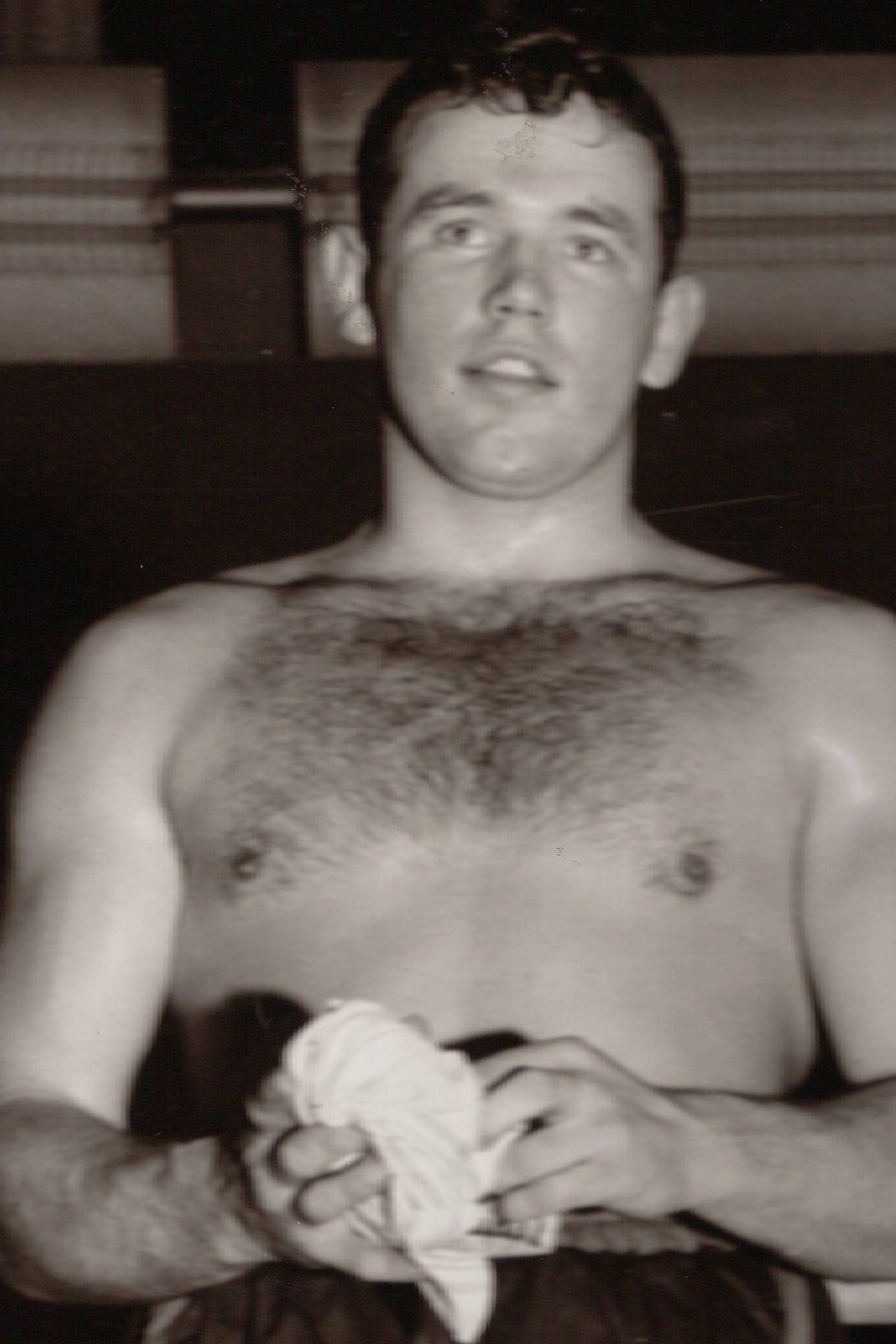
Ingemar Johansson

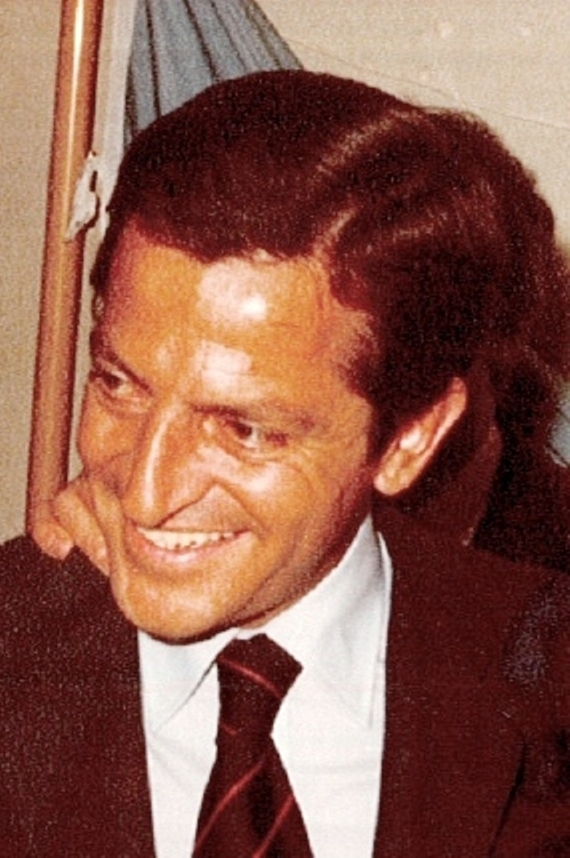
Adolfo Suárez

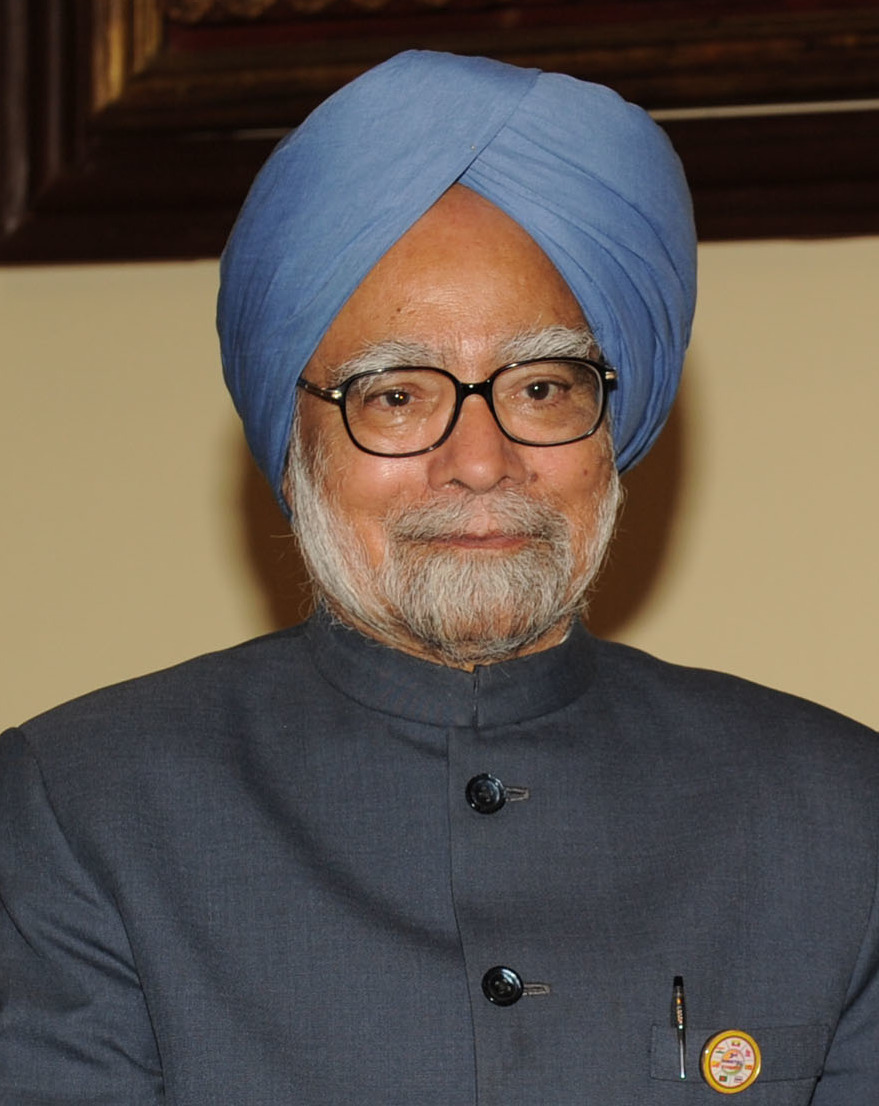
Manmohan Singh

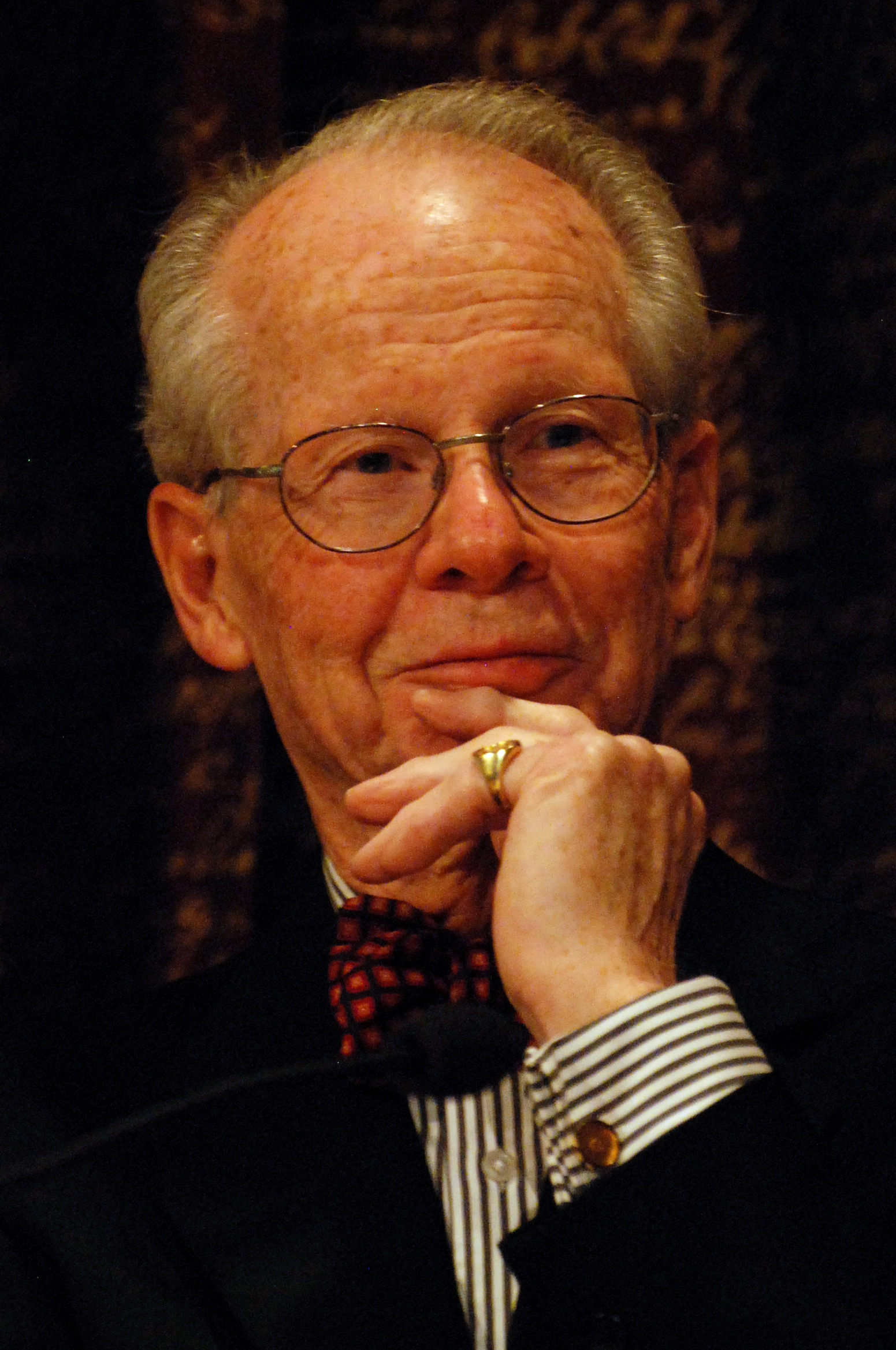
Oliver E. Williamson

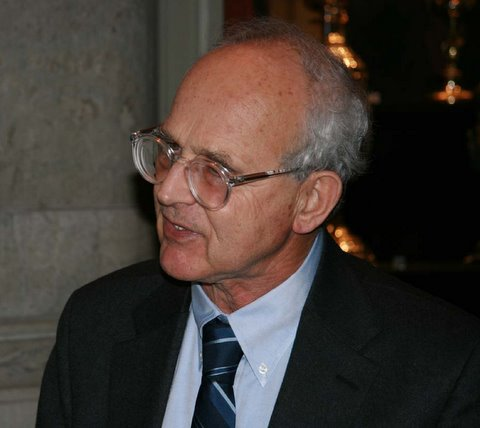
Rainer Weiss

- September 1
  - Sunny von Bülow, American socialite (d. 2008)
  - Derog Gioura, Nauruan politician, President of Nauru (d. 2008)
- September 3
  - Eileen Brennan, American actress and singer (d. 2013)
  - Acácio Pereira Magro, Portuguese academic, economist and politician (d. 2018)
- September 5 – Carol Lawrence, American actress, singer and dancer
- September 8
  - Patsy Cline, American singer (d. 1963)
  - Herbert Leuninger, German Roman Catholic priest and refugee rights activist (d. 2020)
- September 9 – Carm Lino Spiteri, Maltese architect and politician (d. 2008)
- September 11
  - Mustapha Akanbi, Nigerian lawyer and judge (d. 2018)
  - Rinaldo Fidel Brédice, Argentine Roman Catholic prelate (d. 2018)
- September 12 – Atli Dam, 3-Time Prime Minister of Faroe Islands (d. 2005)
- September 13
  - Fernando González Pacheco, Colombian television host, announcer, journalist and actor (d. 2014)
  - Dick Biondi, American Top 40 and Oldies disc jockey (d. 2023)
- September 17 – Khalifa bin Hamad Al Thani, Qatari Emir (d. 2016)
- September 18 – Nikolay Rukavishnikov, Russian cosmonaut (d. 2002)
- September 22
  - Algirdas Brazauskas, President of Lithuania (d. 2010)
  - Ingemar Johansson, Swedish boxer (d. 2009)
- September 25
  - Glenn Gould, Canadian pianist (d. 1982)
  - Adolfo Suárez, 1st Spanish prime minister after the dictatorship of Franco (d. 2014)
- September 26
  - Clifton Williams, American naval aviator and engineer (d. 1967)
  - Donna Douglas, American actress (The Beverly Hillbillies) (d. 2015)
  - Vladimir Voinovich, Russian writer (d. 2018)
  - Manmohan Singh, Indian economist and 13th prime minister of India (d. 2024)
- September 27
  - Oliver E. Williamson, American economist (d. 2020)
  - Roger C. Carmel, American actor (d. 1986)
  - Yash Chopra, Indian film director and producer (d. 2012)
- September 28 – Víctor Jara, Chilean singer-songwriter (d. 1973)
- September 29
  - Mehmood, Indian actor (d. 2004)
  - Rainer Weiss, German-born American gravitational physicist, Nobel Prize laureate (d. 2025)

=== October ===
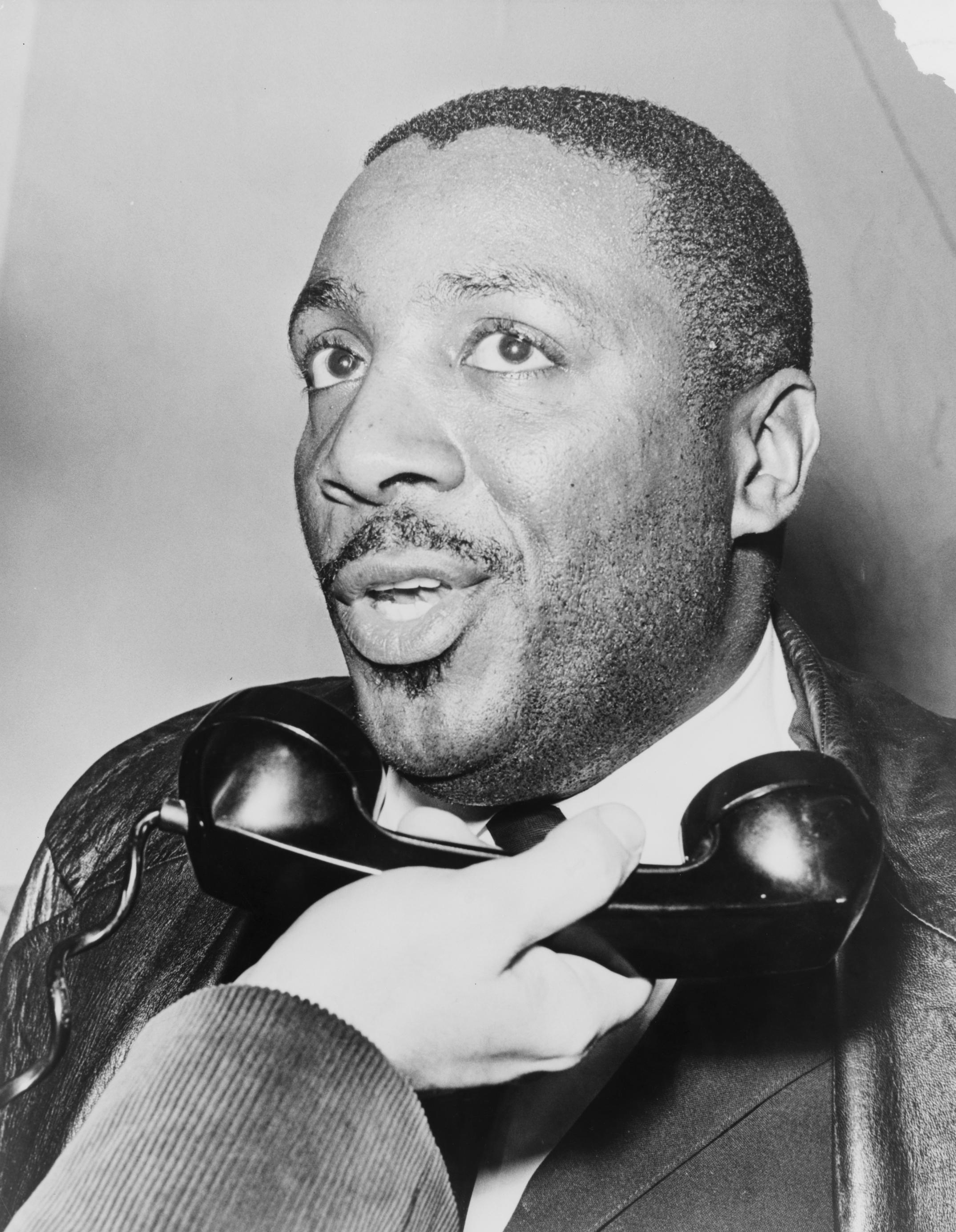
Dick Gregory

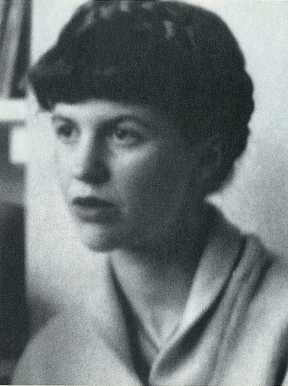
Sylvia Plath

- October 8 – Ray Reardon, Welsh snooker player (d. 2024)
- October 10 – Frances Fox Piven, American sociologist
- October 11 – Dottie West, American singer and songwriter (d. 1991)
- October 12
  - Dick Gregory, African-American comedian and activist (d. 2017)
  - Yuichiro Miura, Japanese alpinist
- October 13 – Liliane Montevecchi, French-Italian actress, dancer and singer (d. 2018)
- October 14 – Wolf Vostell, German artist (d. 1998)
- October 18 – Vytautas Landsbergis, Lithuanian politician
- October 19 – Robert Reed, American actor (The Brady Bunch) (d. 1992)
- October 20 – Rokurō Naya, Japanese voice actor (d. 2014)
- October 24
  - Pierre-Gilles de Gennes, French physicist, Nobel Prize laureate (d. 2007)
  - Robert Mundell, Canadian economist, Nobel Prize laureate (d. 2021)
- October 25 – Meng Sufen, Chinese politician (d. 2020)
- October 26 – Manfred Max-Neef, Chilean economist (d. 2019)
- October 27
  - Jean-Pierre Cassel, French actor (d. 2007)
  - Harry Gregg, Northern Irish football goalkeeper and manager (d. 2020)
  - Sylvia Plath, American poet and author (d. 1963)
- October 28
  - Spyros Kyprianou, President of Cyprus (d. 2002)
  - Suzy Parker, American fashion model and actress (d. 2003)
- October 31 – Iemasa Kayumi, Japanese voice actor, actor and narrator (d. 2014)

=== November ===
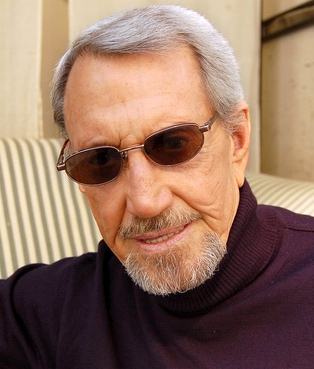
Roy Scheider

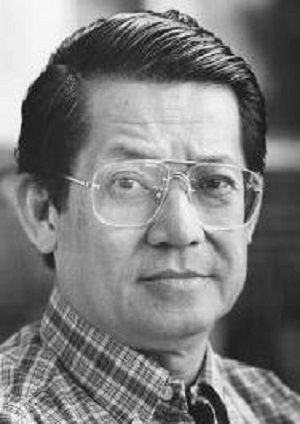
Benigno Aquino Jr.

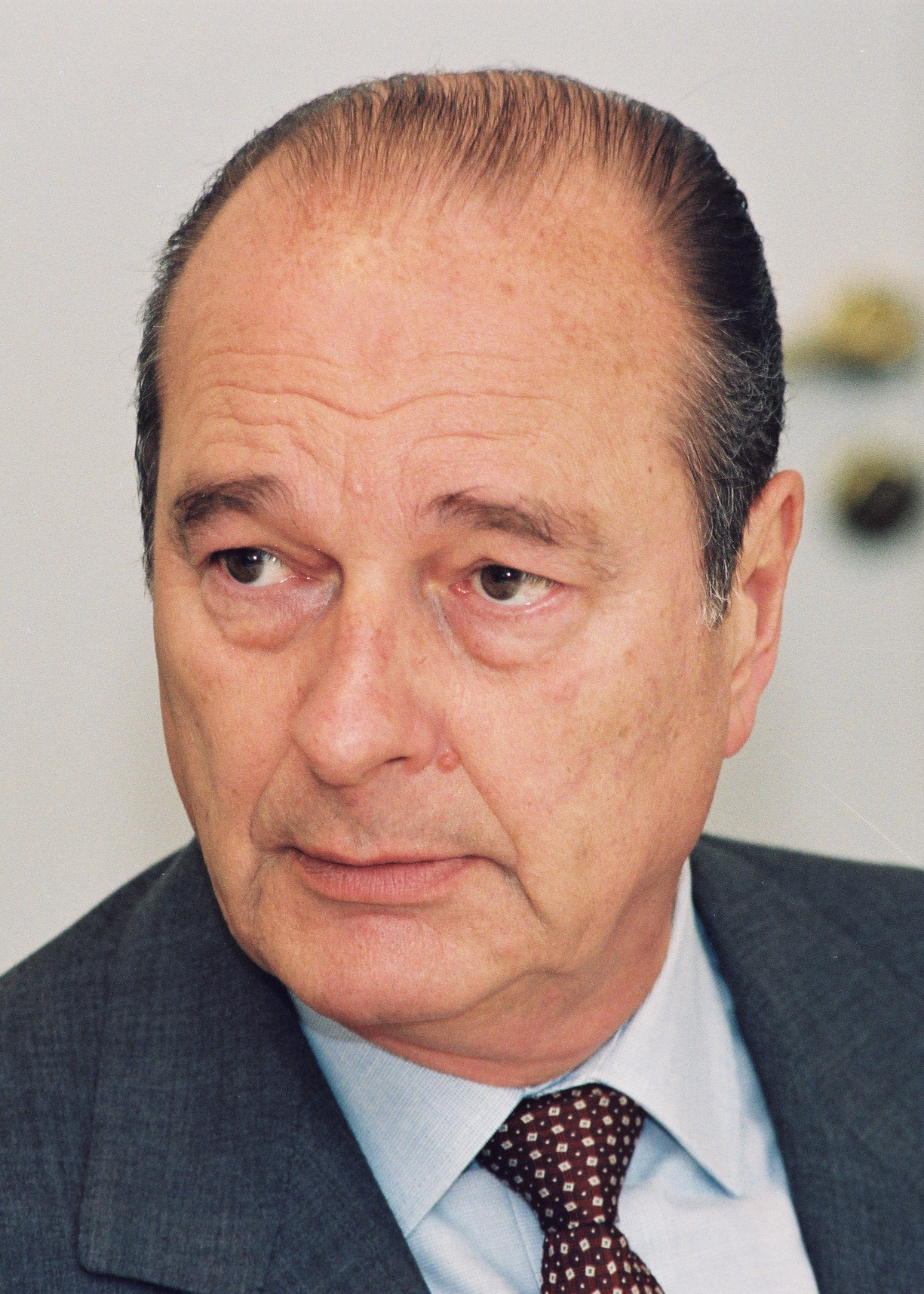
Jacques Chirac

- November 2 – Henri Namphy, 35th president of Haiti (d. 2018)
- November 3 – Albert Reynolds, 8th taoiseach of Ireland (d. 2014)
- November 4 – Thomas Klestil, President of Austria (d. 2004)
- November 8
  - Stéphane Audran, French actress (d. 2018)
  - Ugo Mifsud Bonnici, Maltese politician, 5th president of Malta
- November 9 – Orfeo Reda, Italian painter (d. 2025)
- November 10
  - Paul Bley, Canadian pianist (d. 2016)
  - Roy Scheider, American actor (d. 2008)
- November 11 – Germano Mosconi, Italian journalist (d. 2012)
- November 13 – Richard Mulligan, American actor (d. 2000)
- November 15
  - Petula Clark, British singer, actress and songwriter
  - Clyde McPhatter, American singer (d. 1972)
- November 21 – Pelle Gudmundsen-Holmgreen, Danish composer (d. 2016)
- November 22 – Robert Vaughn, American actor (d. 2016)
- November 23 – Kai Hietarinta, Finnish businessman and ice hockey executive
- November 24 – Claudio Naranjo, Chilean psychiatrist (d. 2019)
- November 27 – Benigno Aquino Jr., Filipino politician and senator (d. 1983)
- November 28 – Gato Barbieri, Argentine jazz saxophonist (d. 2016)
- November 29 – Jacques Chirac, President of France (d. 2019)

=== December ===
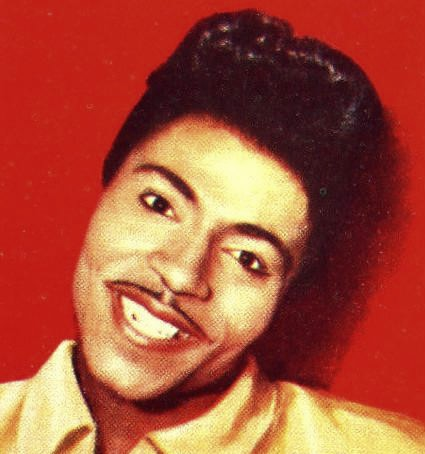
Little Richard

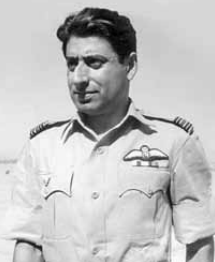
Sajad Haider

- December 1 – Dame Heather Begg, New Zealand mezzo-soprano (d. 2009)
- December 2 – Sergio Bonelli, Italian comic book author and publisher (d. 2011)
- December 3 – Corry Brokken, Dutch singer, Eurovision Song Contest 1957 winner (d. 2016)
- December 4
  - Tengku Ampuan Afzan, Tengku Ampuan of Pahang (d. 1988)
  - Roh Tae-woo, 6th president of South Korea (d. 2021)
- December 5
  - Sheldon Glashow, American physicist
  - Little Richard, American singer and actor (d. 2020)
- December 7
  - Ellen Burstyn, American actress
  - J. B. Sumarlin, Indonesian economist and a former Minister of Finance (d. 2020)
- December 9 – Donald Byrd, American jazz trumpeter (d. 2013)
- December 11
  - Enrique Bermúdez, Nicaraguan Contra leader (d. 1991)
  - Steve Binder, Producer, Director
- December 12 – Bob Pettit, American basketball player (d. 2026)
- December 13 – Tatsuya Nakadai, Japanese actor (d. 2025)
- December 15 – Jesse Belvin, American rhythm and blues singer, pianist, and songwriter (d. 1960)
- December 16 – Rodion Shchedrin, Russian composer and pianist (d. 2025)
- December 21 – Jean-Jacques Guyon, French equestrian (d. 2017)
- December 26 – Sajad Haider, Pakistan Air Force officer and 1965 War veteran (d. 2025)
- December 28
  - Manuel Puig, Argentinian writer (d. 1990)
  - Titien Sumarni, Indonesian actress (d. 1966)
- December 29 – Inga Swenson, American actress and singer (d. 2023)

== Deaths ==
=== January – February ===
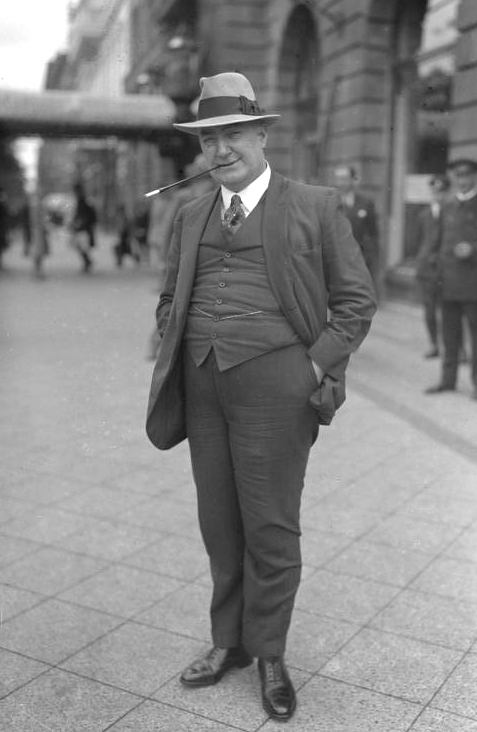
Edgar Wallace

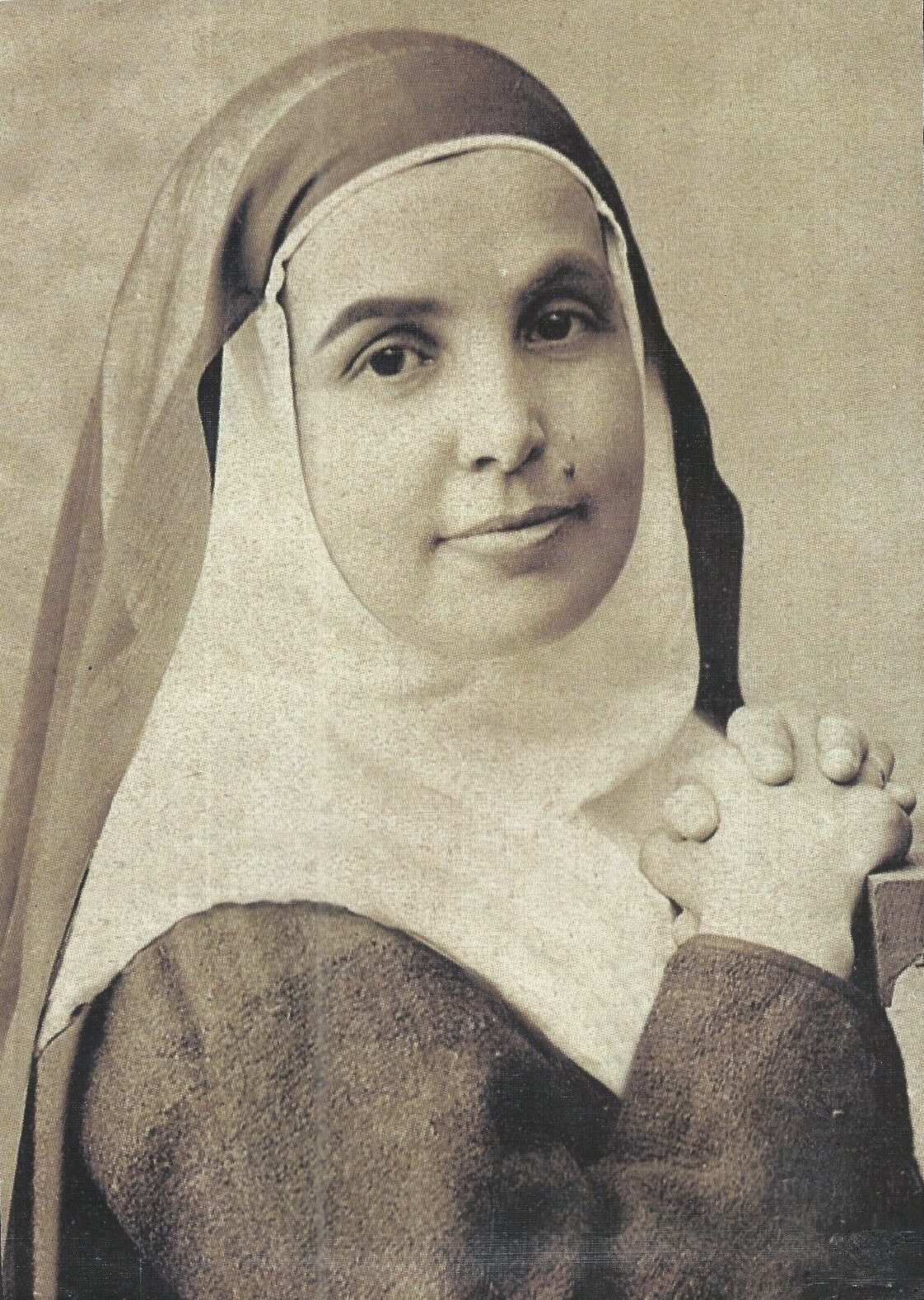
Saint Angela of the Cross

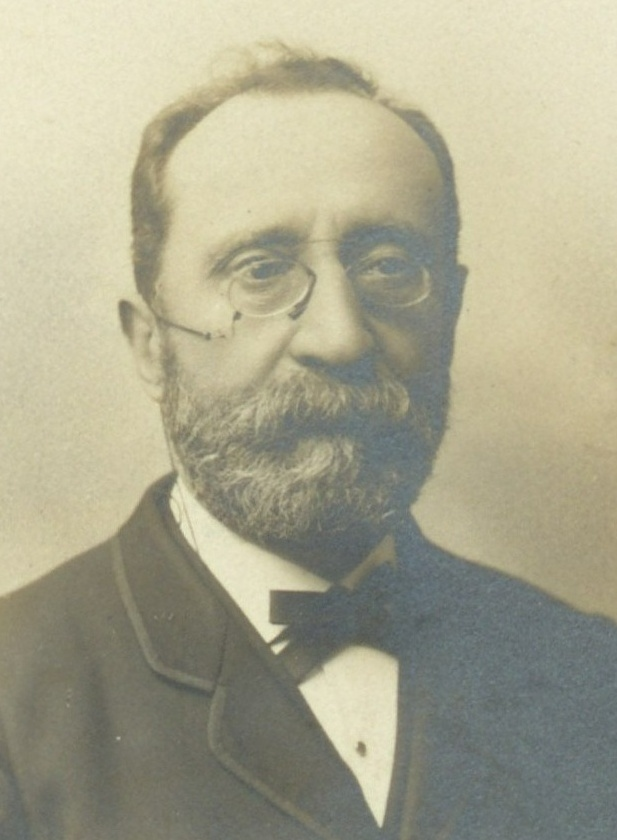
Paolo Boselli

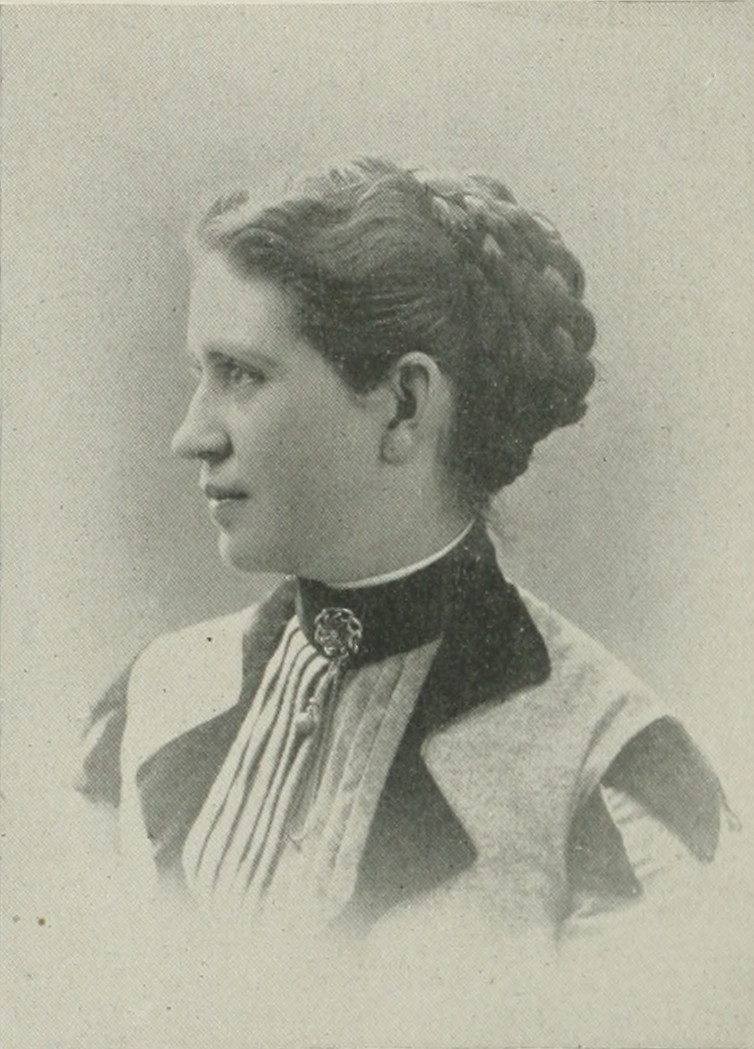
Louise Reed Stowell

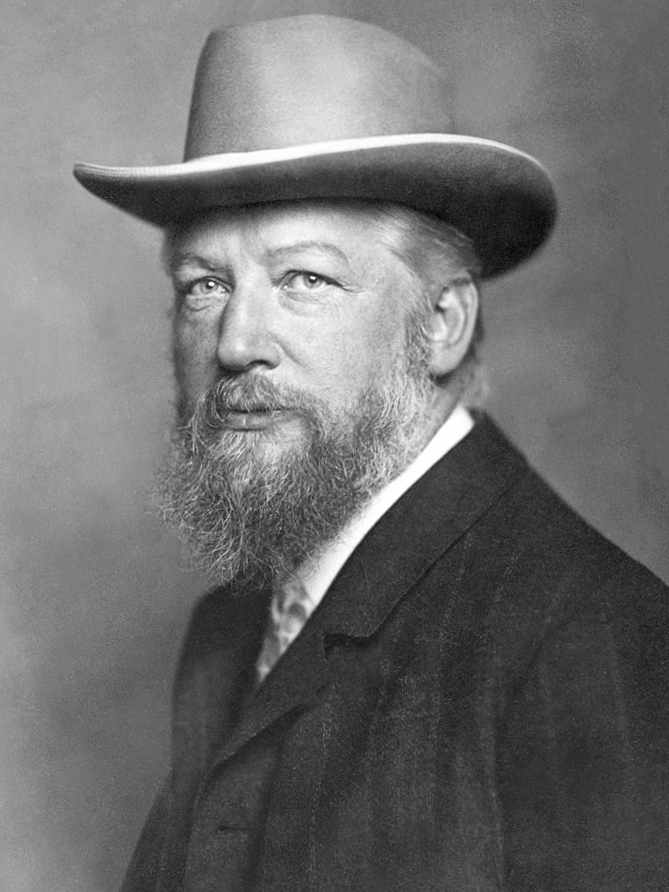
Wilhelm Ostwald

- January 2 – Paul Pau, French general (b. 1848)
- January 7 – André Maginot, French soldier and politician (b. 1877)
- January 8
  - Antoni Maria Alcover i Sureda, Spanish Roman Catholic priest and writer (b. 1862)
  - Eurosia Fabris, Italian Roman Catholic nun and blessed (b. 1866)
- January 12 – James Felts, American newspaper editor and politician (b. 1866)
- January 13 – Ernest Mangnall, English football manager (b. 1866)
- January 18 – Dmitry Shcherbachev, Russian general (b. 1857)
- January 21 – Lytton Strachey, British writer and biographer (b. 1880)
- January 24 – Sir Alfred Yarrow, British shipbuilder and philanthropist (b. 1842)
- January 26
  - Edward Stinson, American aviator and aircraft manufacturer (b. 1893)
  - William Wrigley Jr., American chewing gum industrialist (b. 1861)
- February 1 – Farabundo Martí, Salvadorean revolutionary (murdered) (b. 1893)
- February 2 – Louise Reed Stowell, American scientist, author (b. 1850)
- February 8
  - Jean César Graziani, French general (b. 1859)
  - Yordan Milanov, Bulgarian architect (b. 1867)
- February 10 – Edgar Wallace, British novelist and screenwriter (b. 1875)
- February 15 – Minnie Maddern Fiske, American actress (b. 1865)
- February 16
  - Ferdinand Buisson, French pacifist, recipient of the Nobel Peace Prize (b. 1841)
  - Sir Edgar Speyer, American-born international financier and philanthropist (b. 1862)
- February 18 – Frederick Augustus III, last King of Saxony (b. 1865)
- February 22 – Harriet Converse Moody, American businesswoman and arts patron (b. 1857)
- February 23
  - László Lukács, 17th prime minister of Hungary (b. 1850)
  - Hadley Williams, Canadian surgeon and educator (b. 1864)
- February 29 – Ramon Casas i Carbó, Spanish painter (b. 1866)

=== March – April ===
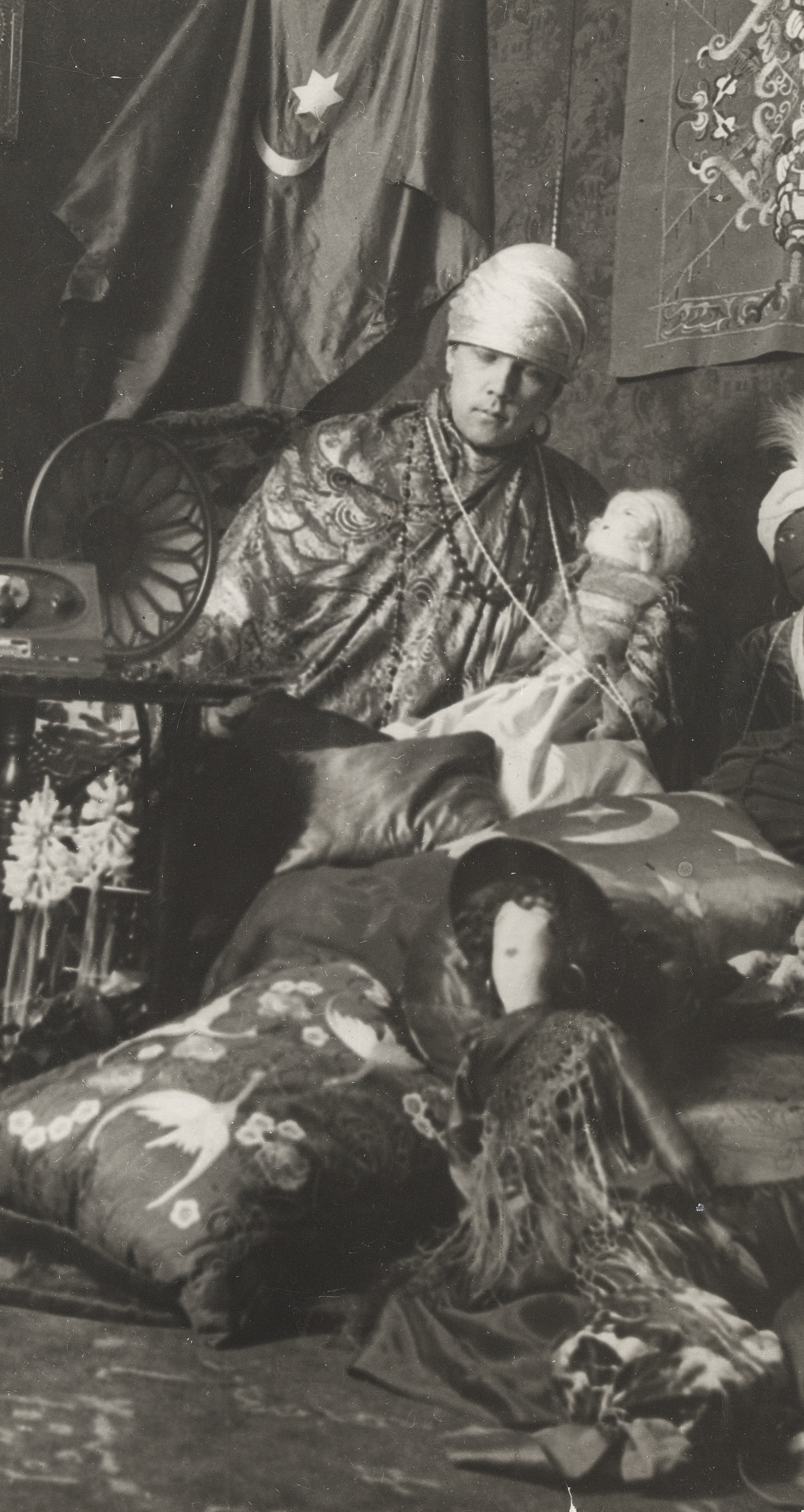
Madame Minna Craucher

- March 1
  - Frank Teschemacher, American musician (b. 1906)
  - Dino Campana, Italian poet (b. 1885)
- March 2 – Angela of the Cross, Spanish Roman Catholic nun and saint (b. 1846)
- March 6 – John Philip Sousa, American band leader, conductor, and composer ("The Stars and Stripes Forever") (b. 1854)
- March 7
  - Heinrich Clam-Martinic, Austrian statesman, former prime minister (b. 1863)
  - Aristide Briand, French statesman, recipient of the Nobel Peace Prize (b. 1862)
- March 8 – Minna Craucher, Finnish socialite and spy (b. 1891)
- March 11 – Dora Carrington, British painter (b. 1893)
- March 10 – Paolo Boselli, 22nd prime minister of Italy (b. 1838)
- March 12 – Ivar Kreuger, Swedish civil engineer and entrepreneur, Swedish Match (b. 1880)
- March 14 – Frederick Jackson Turner, American historian (b. 1861)
- March 17 – Iliaz Vrioni, Albanian statesman, former prime minister (b. 1882)
- March 14 – George Eastman, American inventor (Kodak) (b. 1854)
- March 24 – George Harris, 4th Baron Harris, English cricketer and colonial administrator (b. 1851)
- March 31 – Eben Byers, American steel tycoon and socialite (radiation poisoning) (b. 1880)
- April 2
  - Rose Coghlan, English actress (b. 1851)
  - Bill Pickett, African-American cowboy whose parents were slaves (b. 1870)
- April 4 – Wilhelm Ostwald, German chemist, Nobel Prize laureate (b. 1853)
- April 5 – Phar Lap, Australian racehorse (b. 1926)
- April 20 – Giuseppe Peano, Italian mathematician (b. 1858)
- April 22 – Ferenc Oslay, Hungarian-Slovene historian, writer and irredenta (b. 1883)
- April 26 – Bill Lockwood, English cricketer (b. 1868)
- April 27 – Hart Crane, American poet (b. 1899)
- April 29 – José Félix Uriburu, 22nd president of Argentina (b. 1868)

=== May – June ===
- May 3 – Charles Fort, American researcher of the unusual (b. 1874)
- May 7 – Paul Doumer, President of France (assassinated) (b. 1857)
- May 8 – Petar Gudev, 16th prime minister of Bulgaria (b. 1863)
- May 15 – Tsuyoshi Inukai, 18th prime minister of Japan (assassinated) (b. 1855)
- May 22 – Lady Gregory, Irish writer and folklorist (b. 1852)
- May 25 – Franz von Hipper, German admiral (b. 1863)
- May 26 – Yoshinori Shirakawa, Japanese general (assassinated) (b. 1869)
- May 30 – John Hubbard, American admiral (b. 1849)
- June 3 – Dorabji Tata, Indian businessman (b. 1859)
- June 6 – Ernest Broșteanu, Romanian general (b. 1869)
- June 9 – Edith Cowan, Australian social reformer and politician (b. 1861)
- June 12 – Theo Heemskerk, Prime Minister of the Netherlands (b. 1852)
- June 13 – Sir Alexander Bethell, British admiral (b. 1855)
- June 14 – Arthur Lawley, 6th Baron Wenlock, British colonial administrator (b. 1860)
- June 15 – Robert Latta (philosopher) (b. 1865)
- June 16 – Felipe Segundo Guzmán, 30th president of Bolivia (b. 1879)
- June 19 – Sol Plaatje, South African journalist, politician and writer. (b. 1876)
- June 21 – Major Taylor, American cyclist (b. 1878)
- June 24 – Ernst Põdder, Estonian military commander (b. 1879)
- June 29 – William Humble Ward, 2nd Earl of Dudley, 4th governor-general of Australia (b. 1867)

=== July – August ===
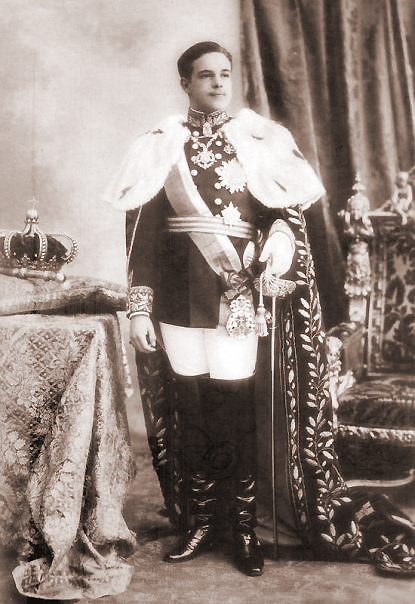
King Manuel II of Portugal

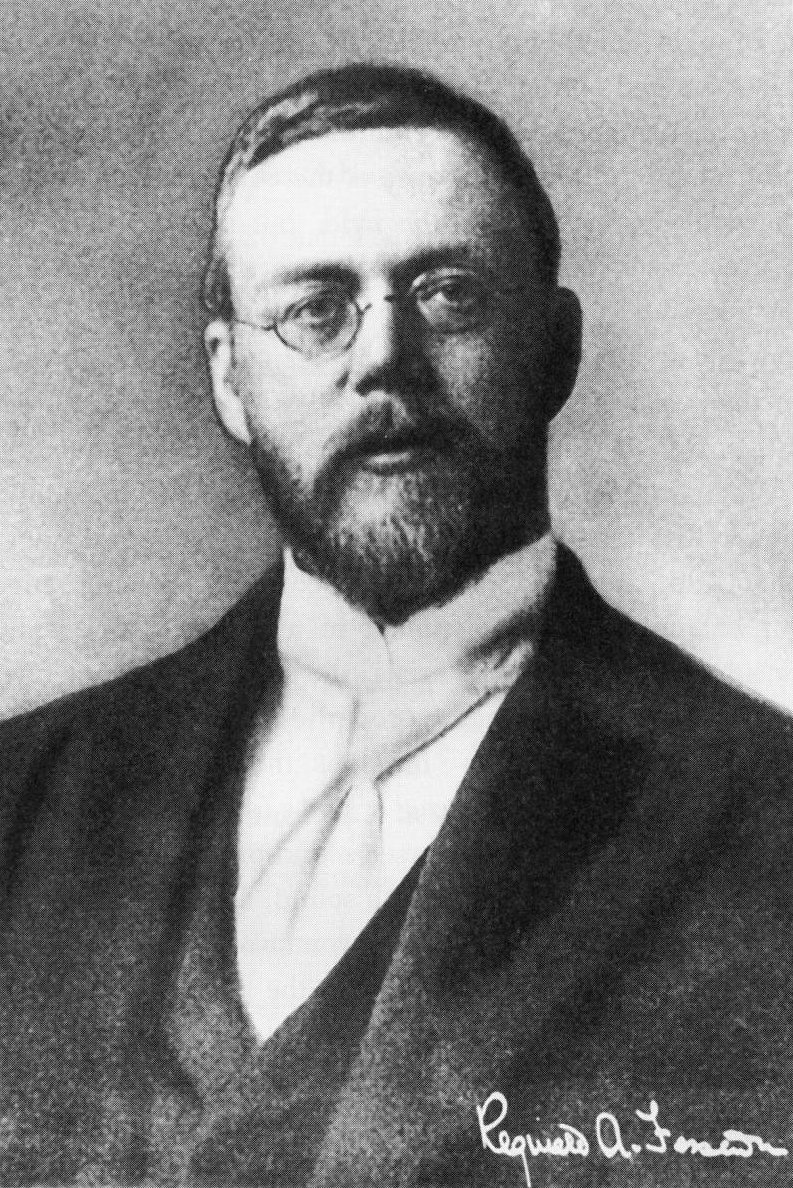
Reginald Fessenden

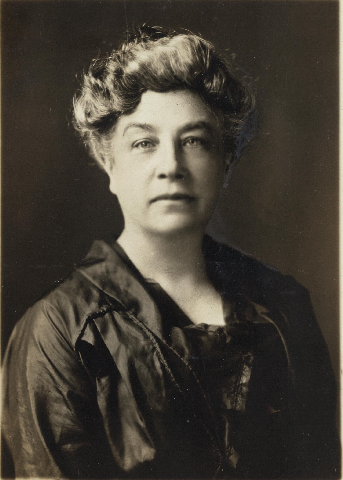
Kate M. Gordon

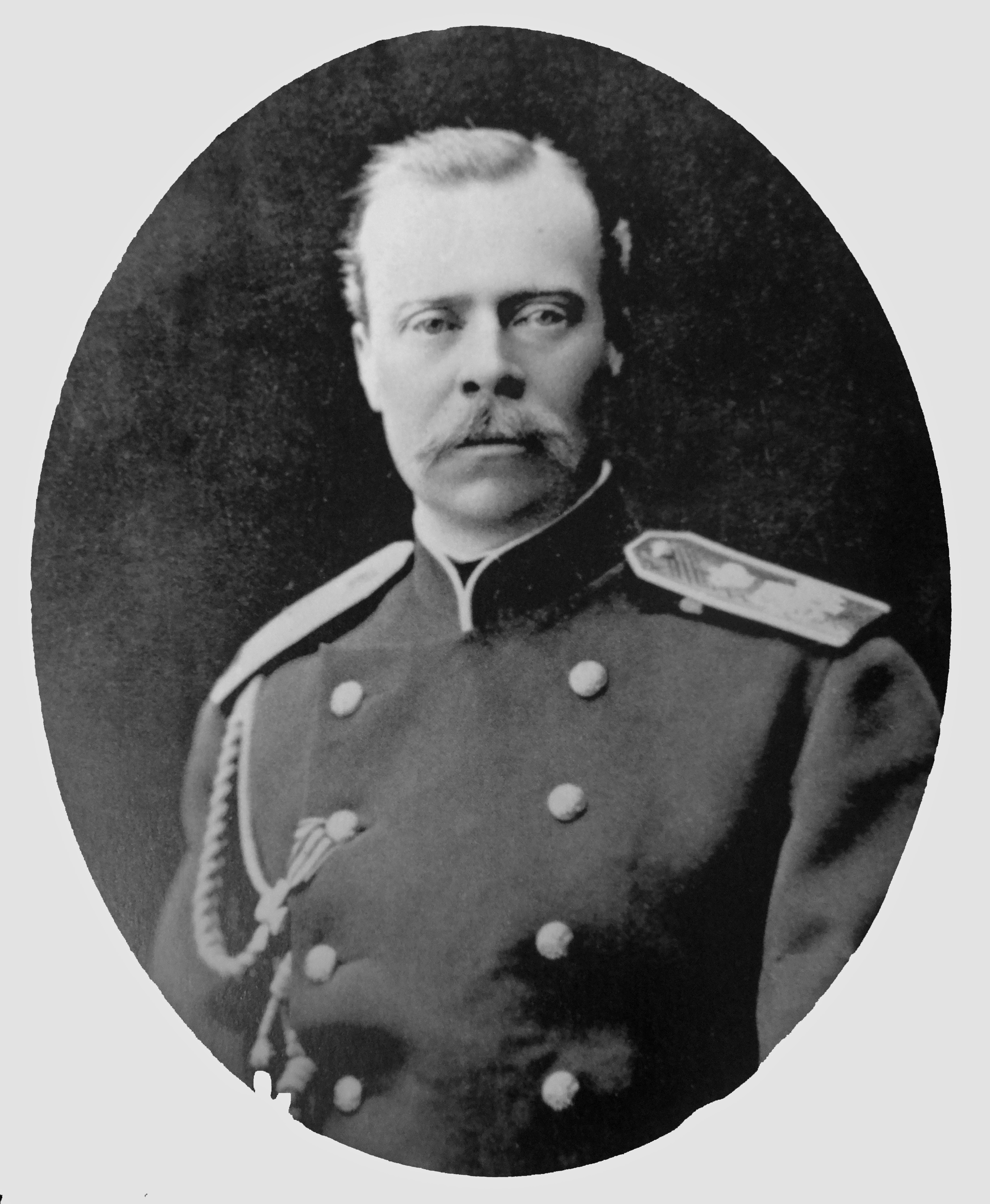
Duke Alexander Petrovich of Oldenburg

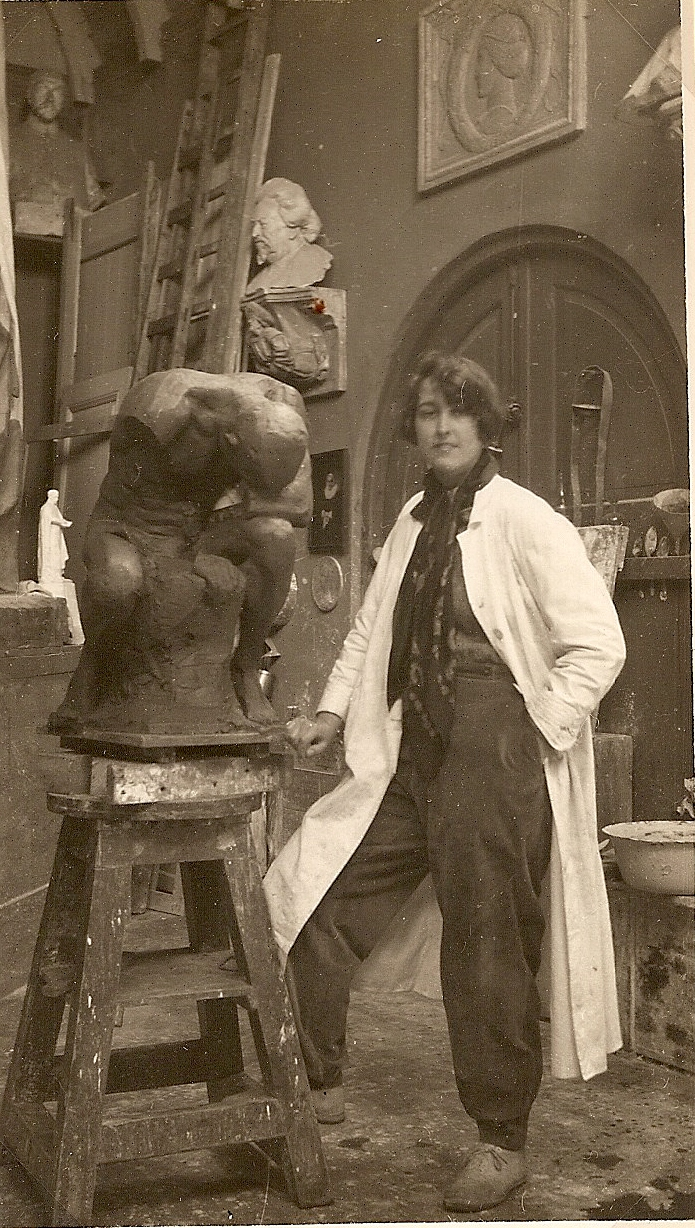
C. C. van Asch van Wijck

- July 2 – King Manuel II of Portugal (b. 1889)
- July 6 – Kenneth Grahame, British-born author (The Wind In The Willows) (b. 1859)
- July 9 – King C. Gillette, American businessman, safety razor inventor (b. 1855)
- July 10 – Martha Hughes Cannon, American politician (b. 1857)
- July 15 – Cornelis Jacobus Langenhoven, South African playwright, poet and politician. (b. 1873)
- July 18 – Matsumura Tatsuo, Japanese admiral (b. 1868)
- July 22
  - Reginald Fessenden, Canadian inventor (b. 1866)
  - Errico Malatesta, Italian anarchist (b. 1853)
  - Florenz Ziegfeld Jr., American Broadway impresario (b. 1867)
- July 23
  - Emma Pow Bauder, American evangelist, missionary, reformer, and author (b. 1848)
  - Tenby Davies, Welsh half-mile world champion runner (b. 1884)
  - Alberto Santos-Dumont, Brazilian aviation pioneer (suicide) (b. 1873)
- July 24 – Hidaka Sōnojō, Japanese admiral (b. 1848)
- July 27 – Archduchess Gisela of Austria (b. 1856)
- August 1 – Sulejman Delvina, Albanian politician, 5th prime minister of Albania (b. 1884)
- August 2
  - Dan Brouthers, American baseball player and MLB Hall of Famer (b. 1858)
  - Ignaz Seipel, two-time Chancellor of Austria (b. 1876)
- August 15 – Traian Moșoiu, Romanian general and politician (b. 1868)
- August 18 – Hans Zenker, German admiral (b. 1870)
- August 19 – Johannes Schober, three-time Chancellor of Austria (b. 1874)
- August 24 – Kate M. Gordon, American suffragette (b. 1861)

=== September – October ===
- September 5 – Paul Bern, American screenwriter (b. 1889)
- September 6
  - Duke Alexander of Oldenburg (b. 1844)
  - Sir Gilbert Parker, 1st Baronet, Canadian-born British novelist and politician (b. 1862)
- September 8 – Christian von Ehrenfels, Austrian philosopher (b. 1859)
- September 13 – Julius Röntgen, German-Dutch classical composer (b. 1855)
- September 16
  - Sir Ronald Ross, British physician, recipient of the Nobel Prize in Physiology or Medicine (b. 1857)
  - Peg Entwistle, film actress (b. 1908)
- September 18 – C. C. van Asch van Wijck, Dutch artist, sculptor (b. 1900)
- September 20 – Wovoka, Paiute visionary (Ghost Dance) (b. c. 1856)
- September 23 – Jules Chéret, French poster designer (b. 1836)
- September 25 – Joel R. P. Pringle, American admiral (b. 1873)
- September 27 – Frédéric-Georges Herr, French general (b. 1855)
- September 29 – Jesse Pomeroy, youngest convicted murderer in Massachusetts (b. 1859)
- September 30
  - Francisco S. Carvajal, 36th president of Mexico (b. 1870)
  - Constantin Coandă, Romanian general and politician, 26th prime minister of Romania (b. 1857)
- October 3 – Emanuel Hoffmann, Swiss jurist and art collector.
- October 5 – Christopher Brennan, Australian poet and scholar (b. 1870)
- October 15 – Élisabeth Renaud, French teacher, socialist activist, and feminist (b. 1846)
- October 17 – Lucy Bacon, American painter (b. 1857)
- October 22 – Anna Elizabeth Dickinson, American orator and lecturer (b. 1842)
- October 26 – Margaret Brown ("The Unsinkable Molly Brown"), Denver socialite, noted survivor of the sinking of the RMS Titanic (b. 1867)>
- October 30 – Paul Methuen, 3rd Baron Methuen, British field marshal (b. 1845)

=== November – December ===
- November 4 – Belle Bennett, American actress (b. 1891)
- November 12 – Alessandro Tonini, Italian aeronautical engineer and aircraft designer and manufacturer (b. 1885)
- November 15 – Charles W. Chesnutt, African-American author, essayist and political activist (b. 1858)
- November 17 – Leónidas Plaza, 16th president of Ecuador (b. 1865)
- December 2 – Amadeo Vives, Spanish composer (b. 1871)
- December 4 – Gustav Meyrink, Austrian writer (b. 1868)
- December 8 – Gertrude Jekyll, English garden designer, writer and artist (b. 1843)
- December 9
  - Begum Rokeya, Bangladeshi writer and social worker (b. 1880)
  - Isa ibn Ali Al Khalifa, Hakim of Bahrain (b. 1848)
- December 18 – Eduard Bernstein, German socialist (b. 1850)
- December 19 – Yun Bong-gil, Korean resister against Japanese occupation of Korea (executed) (b. 1908)
- December 28 – Malcolm Whitman, American tennis player (b. 1877)

== Nobel Prizes ==

- Physics – Werner Karl Heisenberg
- Chemistry – Irving Langmuir
- Physiology or Medicine – Sir Charles Scott Sherrington, Edgar Douglas Adrian
- Literature – John Galsworthy
- Peace – not awarded
