= 1932 in the United States =

- Decades: 1910s; 1920s; 1930s; 1940s; 1950s
- See also: History of the United States (1918–1945); Timeline of United States history (1930–1949); List of years in the United States

Events from the year 1932 in the United States.

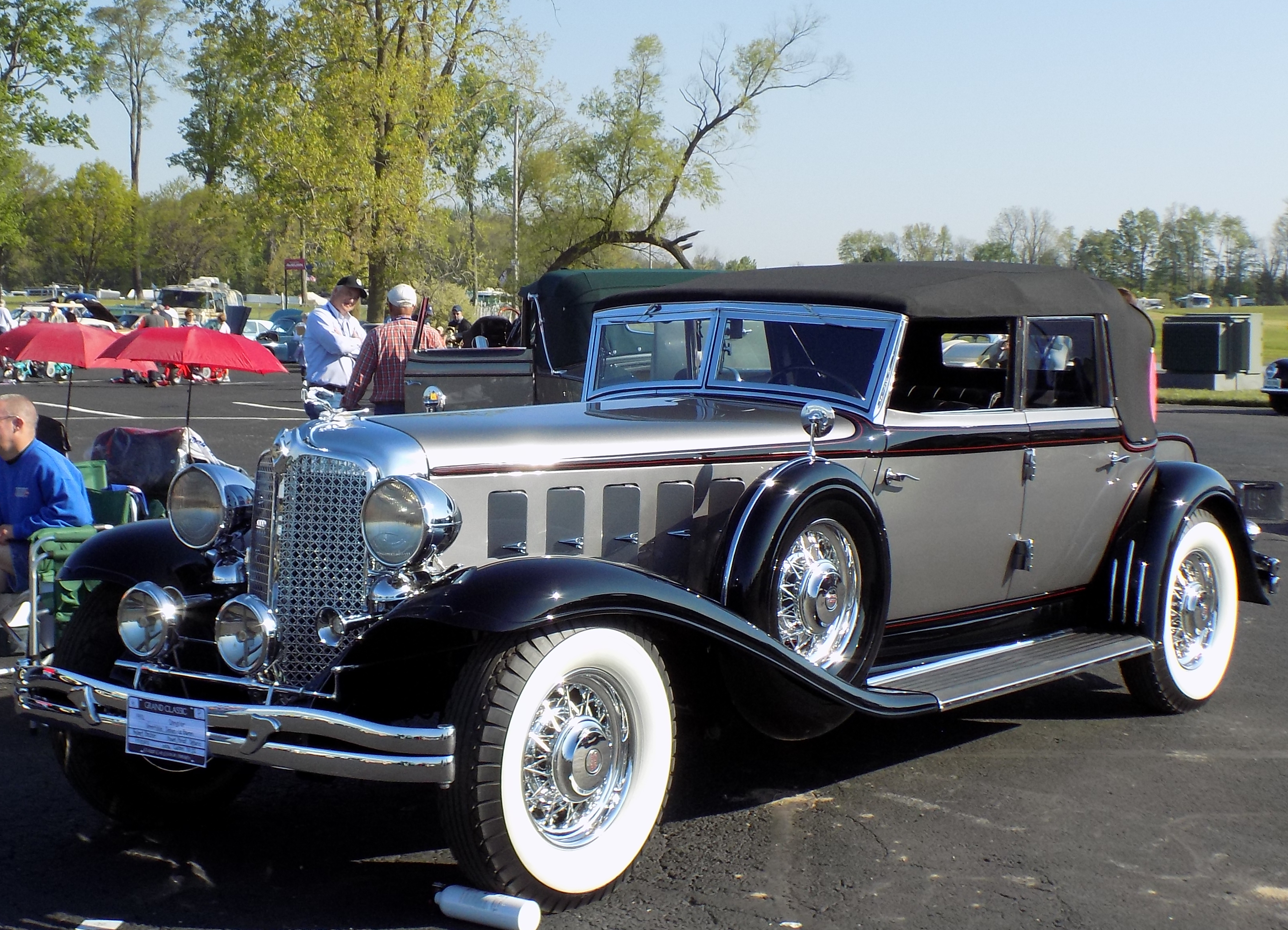
1932 Chrysler Imperial Convertible Sedan by LeBaron.

== Incumbents ==
=== Federal government ===
- President: Herbert Hoover (R-California)
- Vice President: Charles Curtis (R-Kansas)
- Chief Justice: Charles Evans Hughes (New York)
- Speaker of the House of Representatives: John Nance Garner (D-Texas)
- Senate Majority Leader: James Eli Watson (R-Indiana)
- Congress: 72nd

==== State governments ====
Governors and lieutenant governors

=== Governors ===
- Governor of Alabama: Benjamin M. Miller (Democratic)
- Governor of Arizona: George W. P. Hunt (Democratic)
- Governor of Arkansas: Harvey Parnell (Democratic)
- Governor of California: James Rolph Jr. (Republican)
- Governor of Colorado: Billy Adams (Democratic)
- Governor of Connecticut: Wilbur Lucius Cross (Democratic)
- Governor of Delaware: C. Douglass Buck (Republican)
- Governor of Florida: Doyle E. Carlton (Democratic)
- Governor of Georgia: Richard Russell Jr. (Democratic)
- Governor of Idaho: C. Ben Ross (Democratic)
- Governor of Illinois: Louis L. Emmerson (Republican)
- Governor of Indiana: Harry G. Leslie (Republican)
- Governor of Iowa: Daniel Webster Turner (Republican)
- Governor of Kansas: Harry H. Woodring (Democratic)
- Governor of Kentucky: Ruby Laffoon (Democratic)
- Governor of Louisiana:
  - until January 25: Huey P. Long (Democratic)
  - January 25-May 10: Alvin Olin King (Democratic)
  - starting May 10: Oscar K. Allen (Democratic)
- Governor of Maine: William Tudor Gardiner (Republican)
- Governor of Maryland: Albert C. Ritchie (Democratic)
- Governor of Massachusetts: Joseph B. Ely (Democratic)
- Governor of Michigan: Wilber Marion Brucker (Republican)
- Governor of Minnesota: Floyd B. Olson (Farmer-Labor)
- Governor of Mississippi: Theodore G. Bilbo (Democratic) (until January 19), Martin Sennett Conner (Democratic) (starting January 19)
- Governor of Missouri: Henry S. Caulfield (Republican)
- Governor of Montana: John E. Erickson (Democratic)
- Governor of Nebraska: Charles W. Bryan (Democratic)
- Governor of Nevada: Fred B. Balzar (Republican)
- Governor of New Hampshire: John Gilbert Winant (Republican)
- Governor of New Jersey: Morgan Foster Larson (Republican) (until January 19), A. Harry Moore (Democratic) (starting January 19)
- Governor of New Mexico: Arthur Seligman (Democratic)
- Governor of New York: Franklin D. Roosevelt (Democratic) (until end of December 31)
- Governor of North Carolina: Oliver Max Gardner (Democratic)
- Governor of North Dakota: George F. Shafer (Republican) (until December 31), William Langer (Republican) (starting December 31)
- Governor of Ohio: George White (Democratic)
- Governor of Oklahoma: William H. Murray (Democratic)
- Governor of Oregon: Julius L. Meier (Independent)
- Governor of Pennsylvania: Gifford Pinchot (Republican)
- Governor of Rhode Island: Norman S. Case (Republican)
- Governor of South Carolina: Ibra Charles Blackwood (Democratic)
- Governor of South Dakota: Warren Green (Republican)
- Governor of Tennessee: Henry Hollis Horton (Democratic)
- Governor of Texas: Ross S. Sterling (Democratic)
- Governor of Utah: George Dern (Democratic)
- Governor of Vermont: Stanley C. Wilson (Republican)
- Governor of Virginia: John Garland Pollard (Democratic)
- Governor of Washington: Roland H. Hartley (Republican)
- Governor of West Virginia: William G. Conley (Republican)
- Governor of Wisconsin: Philip La Follette (Republican)
- Governor of Wyoming: Alonzo M. Clark (Republican)

=== Lieutenant governors ===
- Lieutenant Governor of Alabama: Hugh D. Merrill (Democratic)
- Lieutenant Governor of Arkansas: Lawrence Elery Wilson (Democratic)
- Lieutenant Governor of California: Frank Merriam (Republican)
- Lieutenant Governor of Colorado: Edwin C. Johnson (Democratic) (until month and day unknown), vacant (starting month and day unknown)
- Lieutenant Governor of Connecticut: Samuel R. Spencer (Republican)
- Lieutenant Governor of Delaware: James H. Hazel (Republican)
- Lieutenant Governor of Idaho: G. P. Mix (Democratic)
- Lieutenant Governor of Illinois: Fred E. Sterling (Republican)
- Lieutenant Governor of Indiana: Edgar D. Bush (Republican)
- Lieutenant Governor of Iowa: Arch W. McFarlane (Republican)
- Lieutenant Governor of Kansas: Jacob W. Graybill (Republican)
- Lieutenant Governor of Kentucky: Happy Chandler (Democratic)
- Lieutenant Governor of Louisiana:
  - until January 25: Alvin O. King (Democratic)
  - January 25-May 10: vacant
  - starting May 10: John B. Fournet (Democratic)
- Lieutenant Governor of Massachusetts: William S. Youngman (Republican)
- Lieutenant Governor of Michigan: Luren D. Dickinson (Republican)
- Lieutenant Governor of Minnesota: Henry M. Arens (Farmer Labor)
- Lieutenant Governor of Mississippi: Bidwell Adam (Democratic) (until January 19), Dennis Murphree (Democratic) (starting January 19)
- Lieutenant Governor of Missouri: Edward Henry Winter (Republican)
- Lieutenant Governor of Montana: Frank A. Hazelbaker (Republican)
- Lieutenant Governor of Nebraska: Theodore Metcalfe (Republican)
- Lieutenant Governor of Nevada: Morley Griswold (Republican)
- Lieutenant Governor of New Mexico: Andrew W. Hockenhull (Democratic)
- Lieutenant Governor of New York: Herbert H. Lehman (Democratic) (until end of December 31)
- Lieutenant Governor of North Carolina: Richard T. Fountain (Democratic)
- Lieutenant Governor of North Dakota: John W. Carr (Republican)
- Lieutenant Governor of Ohio: William G. Pickrel (Democratic)
- Lieutenant Governor of Oklahoma: Robert Burns (Democratic)
- Lieutenant Governor of Pennsylvania: Edward C. Shannon (Republican)
- Lieutenant Governor of Rhode Island: James G. Connolly (Republican)
- Lieutenant Governor of South Carolina: James O. Sheppard (Democratic)
- Lieutenant Governor of South Dakota: Odell K. Whitney (Republican)
- Lieutenant Governor of Tennessee: Ambrose B. Broadbent (Democratic)
- Lieutenant Governor of Texas: Edgar E. Witt (Democratic)
- Lieutenant Governor of Vermont: Benjamin Williams (Republican)
- Lieutenant Governor of Virginia: James H. Price (Democratic)
- Lieutenant Governor of Washington: John Arthur Gellatly (Republican)
- Lieutenant Governor of Wisconsin: Henry A. Huber (Republican)

== Events ==
=== January–March ===
- January 1 – The United States Post Office Department issues a set of 12 stamps commemorating the 200th anniversary of George Washington's birth.
- January 7 – The Stimson Doctrine is proclaimed, in response to the Japanese invasion of Manchuria.
- January 12 – Hattie W. Caraway of Arkansas becomes the first woman elected to the United States Senate.
- February 2 – The Reconstruction Finance Corporation begins operations in Washington, D.C.
- February 4 – The 1932 Winter Olympics open in Lake Placid, New York.
- February 15 – Clara, Lu & Em, generally regarded as the first daytime network soap opera, debuts in its morning time slot over the Blue Network of NBC Radio, having originally been a late evening program.
- February 22 (Washington's Birthday) – The Purple Heart is revived by War Department General Order No. 3 as a decoration of the U.S. military awarded in the name of the president to those wounded or killed while serving with the U.S. Armed Forces; retrospective awards are made.
- March 1 – Lindbergh kidnapping: Charles Lindbergh Jr., the infant son of Charles and Anne Morrow Lindbergh, is kidnapped from the family home near Hopewell, New Jersey.
- March 7 – Four people are killed when police fire upon 3,000 unemployed autoworkers marching outside the Ford River Rouge Plant in Dearborn, Michigan.
- March 22 – Tarzan the Ape Man premieres, with Olympic gold medal swimmer Johnny Weissmuller in the title role; he will star in a total of twelve Tarzan films.

=== April–June ===
- April 6 – U.S. president Herbert Hoover supports armament limitations.
- May 2 – Comedian Jack Benny's radio show airs for the first time.
- May 12 – Ten weeks after his abduction, the infant son of Charles Lindbergh is found dead just a few miles from the family home.
- May 20–21 – Amelia Earhart flies from the US to Derry, Northern Ireland in 14 hours 54 minutes.
- May 29 – The first of approximately 15,000 World War I veterans arrive in Washington, D.C. demanding the immediate payment of their military bonus, becoming known as the Bonus Army.
- c. June – The Republican Citizens Committee Against National Prohibition is established for the repeal of Prohibition in the United States.
- June 6
  - The Revenue Act of 1932 is enacted, creating the first gas tax in the United States at 1 cent per US gallon (0.26 ¢/L) sold.
  - The 6.4 M_{w} Eureka earthquake affects the north coast of California with a maximum Mercalli intensity of VIII (Severe). Three people are injured and one killed.
- June 29 – The comedy serial Vic and Sade debuts on NBC Radio.

=== July–September ===
- July 8 – The Dow Jones Industrial Average reaches its lowest level of the Great Depression, bottoming out at 41.22.
- July 28 – Two people are killed when police fire upon the Bonus Army of World War I veterans gathered in Washington, D.C. U.S. President Herbert Hoover orders the U.S. Army to evict the protesters forcibly and troops disperse the last of the Bonus Army the next day.
- July 30–August 14 – The 1932 Summer Olympics take place in Los Angeles.
- July 30 – Walt Disney's Flowers and Trees, the first animated cartoon to be presented in full Technicolor, premieres in Los Angeles, California. It releases in theaters, along with Eugene O'Neill's experimental play Strange Interlude (starring Norma Shearer and Clark Gable), and will go on to win the first Academy Award for Best Animated Short.
- August – A farmers' revolt begins in the Midwestern United States.
- August 7 – Raymond Edward Welch becomes the first one-legged man to scale 6,288 feet (1,917 m) Mount Washington (New Hampshire).
- August 10 – A 5.1 kg chondrite-type meteorite breaks into at least 7 fragments and strikes earth near the town of Archie in Cass County, Missouri.
- August 31 – A total solar eclipse is visible from northern Canada through northeastern Vermont, New Hampshire, southwestern Maine and the Capes of Massachusetts.

=== October–December ===
- October 1 – The famous Babe Ruth's called shot is made in the fifth inning of game 3 of the 1932 World Series (baseball) during the 1932 New York Yankees season.
- October 2 – The New York Yankees defeat the Chicago Cubs, 4 games to 0, to win their 4th World Series title in baseball.
- October 13 – Chief Justice Charles Evans Hughes lays the cornerstone for a new U.S. Supreme Court building.
- October 15 – The Michigan Marching Band (at this time called the Varsity band) debuts Script Ohio at the Michigan versus Ohio State game in Columbus.
- October 23 – Fred Allen's radio comedy show debuts on CBS.
- November 1 – The San Francisco Opera House opens.
- November 7 – Buck Rogers in the 25th Century airs on radio for the first time.
- November 8 – 1932 United States presidential election: Democratic Governor of New York Franklin D. Roosevelt defeats incumbent Republican President Herbert Hoover in a landslide victory, having promised a New Deal and repeal of Prohibition.
- November 16 – New York City's Palace Theatre fully converts to a cinema, which is considered the final death knell of vaudeville as a popular entertainment in the United States.
- November 18 – The 5th Academy Awards, hosted by Conrad Nagel, are presented at Ambassador Hotel in Los Angeles, with Edmund Goulding's Grand Hotel winning the Academy Award for Best Picture. John Ford and Brian Desmond Hurst's Arrowsmith and King Vidor's The Champ both receive the most nominations with four, while the latter film and Frank Borzage's Bad Girl both receive the most awards with two. Borzage also wins Best Director, his second overall.
- November 24 – In Washington, D.C., the FBI Scientific Crime Detection Laboratory (better known as the FBI Crime Lab) officially opens.
- November 30 – Exhibition American Folk Art: The Art of the Common Man in America 1750–1900 opens at the Museum of Modern Art in New York City.
- December 24 – Moweaqua Coal Mine disaster: a methane gas explosion claims 54 lives in Illinois.
- December 27 – Radio City Music Hall opens in New York City.

=== Undated ===
- Unemployment in the USA – c. 33% – 14 million.
- Maxwell House Haggadah first distributed.
- Dust storms begin in Kansas, Oklahoma, Colorado, New Mexico and Texas, the start of the Dust Bowl in the United States.
- The Zippo Manufacturing Co. is established to produce lighters in the United States.

=== Ongoing ===
- Lochner era (c. 1897–c. 1937)
- U.S. occupation of Haiti (1915–1934)
- Prohibition (1920–1933)
- Great Depression (1929–1933)
- Dust Bowl (1930–1936)

== Births ==
=== January ===
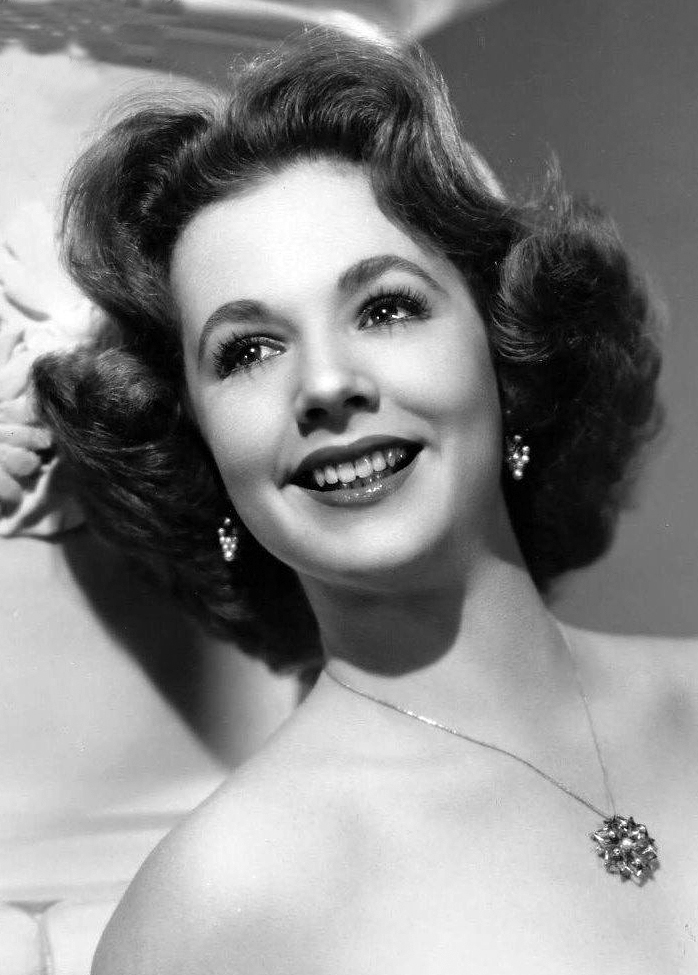
Piper Laurie

- January 1
  - Tzaims Luksus, artist and fashion designer
  - Jackie Parker, American football player and coach (d. 2006)
- January 3 – Dabney Coleman, actor (d. 2024)
- January 5
  - Johnny Adams, blues singer (d. 1998)
  - Frank Layden, NBA executive and coach (d. 2025)
  - Chuck Noll, American football coach (d. 2014)
- January 6 – Stuart A. Rice, chemist (d. 2024)
- January 9 – Robert F. Taft, Jesuit priest (d. 2018)
- January 12 – Sally J. Novetzke, political aide and diplomat (d. 2025)
- January 15 – Cleven Goudeau, art director and cartoonist (d. 2015)
- January 16
  - Carol Davis, businesswoman and football club owner (d. 2025)
  - Dian Fossey, primatologist (killed 1985 in Rwanda)
- January 19
  - Richard Lester, film director
  - Harry Lonsdale, chemist, businessman and politician (d. 2014)
  - Joe Schmidt, American football player and coach (d. 2024)
- January 22 – Piper Laurie, film actress (d. 2023)
- January 23 – James Rado, actor, playwright, director, writer and composer (d. 2022)
- January 31 – Rick Hall, record producer, songwriter and recording studio owner (d. 2018)

=== February ===
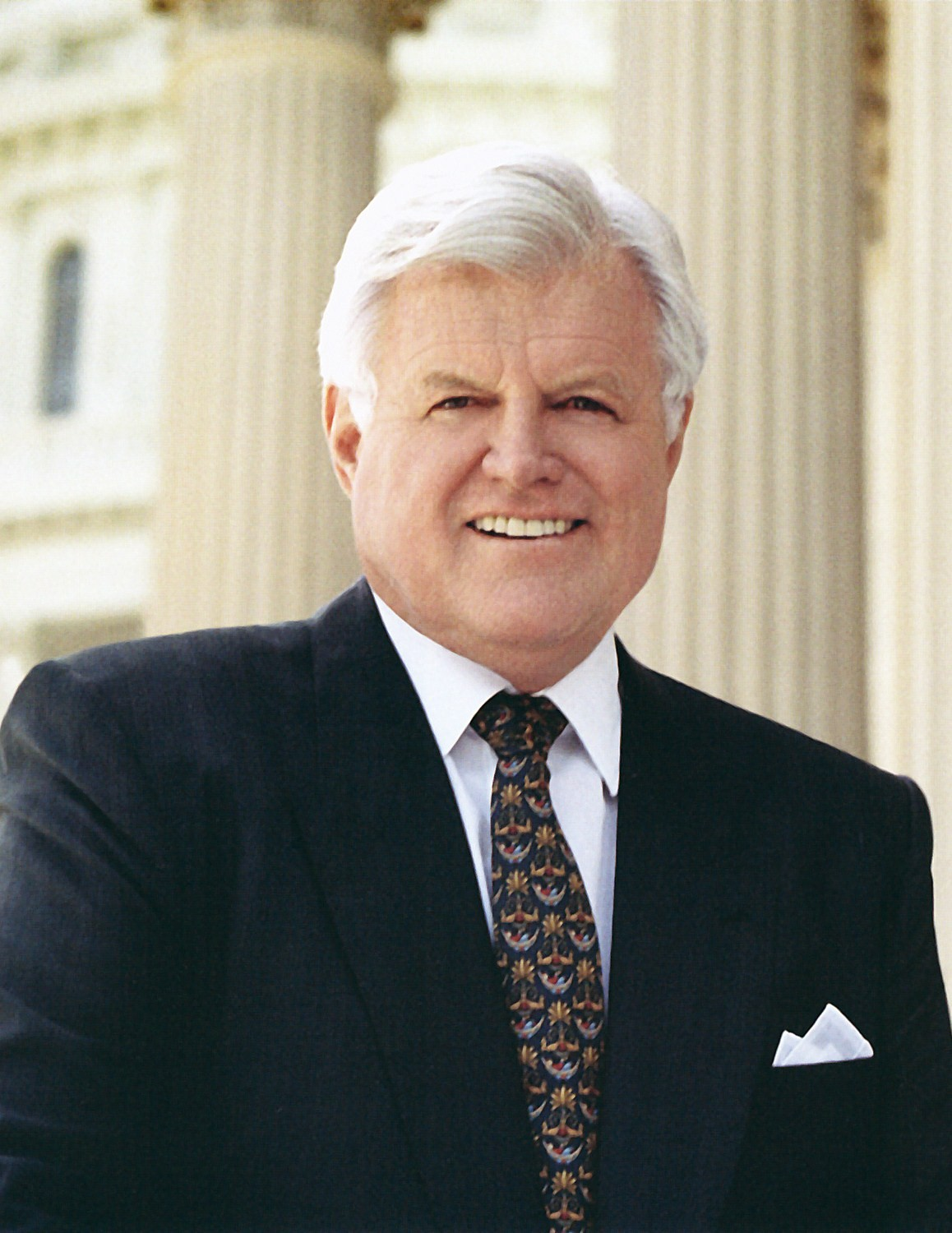
Ted Kennedy

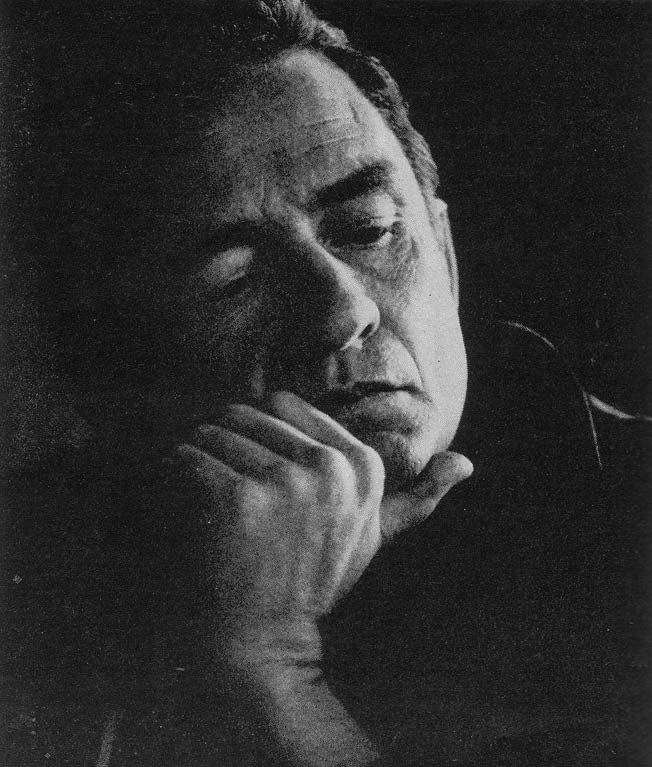
Johnny Cash

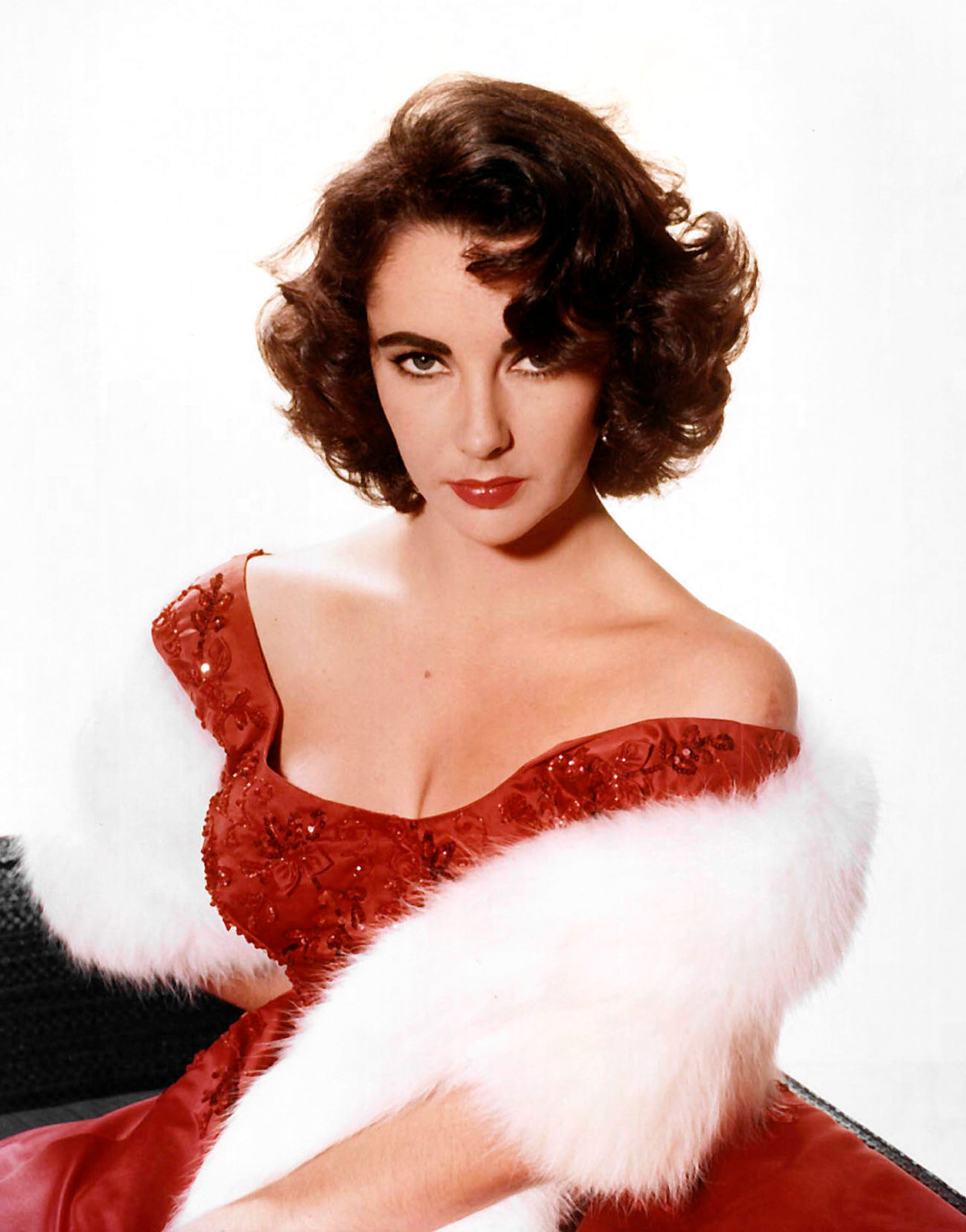
Elizabeth Taylor

- February 2 – Robert Mandan, American actor (d. 2018)
- February 3 – Peggy Ann Garner, American actress (d. 1984)
- February 4 – Herman D. Farrell Jr., American politician (d. 2018)
- February 7
  - Gay Talese, American literary journalist
  - Alfred Worden, American astronaut (d. 2020)
- February 8 – John Williams, American film music composer
- February 10
  - Rockin' Dopsie, American zydeco singer and accordion player (d. 1993)
  - Robert Taylor, American computer scientist (d. 2017)
- February 11 – Jerome Lowenthal, American pianist
- February 12 – Julian Simon, American economist and author (d. 1998)
- February 13 – Susan Oliver, American actress (d. 1990)
- February 14 – Leo Thorsness, American war veteran and politician (d. 2017)
- February 16
  - Harry Goz, American actor (d. 2003)
  - Gretchen Wyler, American dancer, actress and animal rights activist (d. 2007)
- February 22 – Ted Kennedy, American politician (d. 2009)
- February 23
  - Majel Barrett, American actress (d. 2008)
  - Bill Bonds, American television newscaster (d. 2014)
- February 24 – Zell Miller, American politician (d. 2018)
- February 25 – Faron Young, American country singer (d. 1996)
- February 26 – Johnny Cash, American country singer-songwriter, guitarist, actor and author (d. 2003)
- February 27 – Elizabeth Taylor, English-American film actress (d. 2011)
- February 29 – Gene H. Golub, American mathematician (d. 2007)

=== March ===
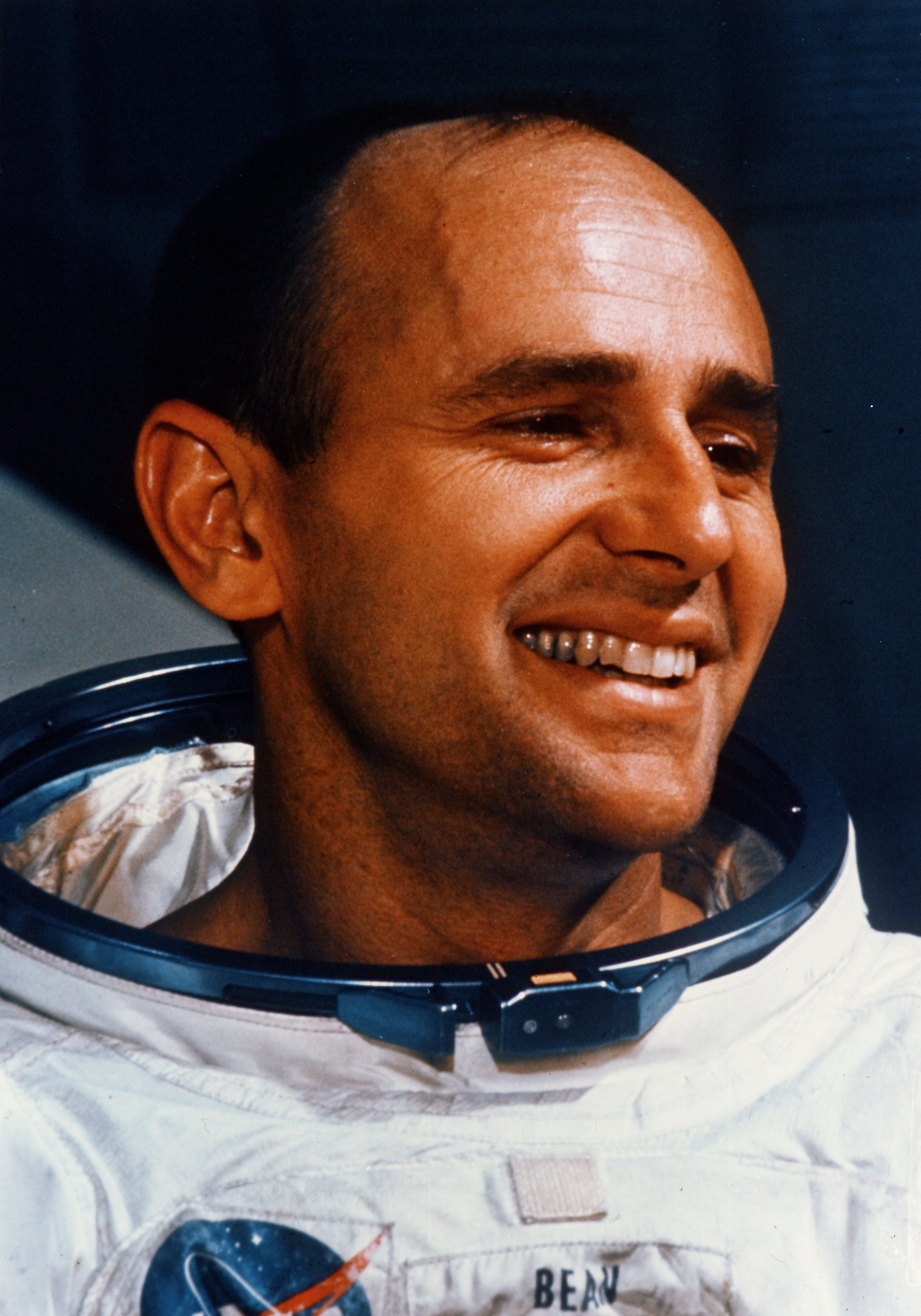
Alan Bean

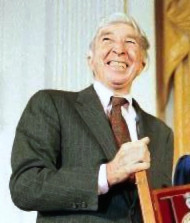
John Updike

- March 2
  - Sterling Stuckey, American historian (d. 2018)
  - Frank E. Petersen, African-American Marine Corps aviator (d. 2015)
- March 4 – Ed Roth, American car designer (d. 2001)
- March 5
  - Paul Sand (b. Paul Sanchez), American actor and comedian
  - Earl Woods, African-American army officer (d. 2006)
- March 7 – Ed Thrasher, American art director and photographer (d. 2006)
- March 11 – Leroy Jenkins, African-American jazz musician and composer (d. 2007)
- March 12 – Andrew Young, African-American politician, diplomat and activist
- March 14
  - Jane Maas, advertising executive and author (d. 2018)
  - Mark Murphy, American jazz singer (d. 2015)
- March 15 – Alan Bean, American naval officer and naval aviator, aeronautical engineer, test pilot, and NASA astronaut (d. 2018)
- March 16 – Walter Cunningham, American astronaut (d. 2023)
- March 17
  - Donald N. Langenberg, American physicist and professor (d. 2019)
  - Hazel Nell Dukes, activist (d. 2025)
- March 18 – John Updike, American novelist and poet (d. 2009)
- March 20 – Tod Dockstader, American composer (d. 2015)
- March 21 – Walter Gilbert, American chemist, Nobel Prize laureate
- March 22 – Leo Welch, American blues musician (d. 2017)
- March 27 – Junior Parker, African-American blues musician (d. 1971)
- March 29 – Al Bianchi, American basketball player (d. 2019)

=== April ===
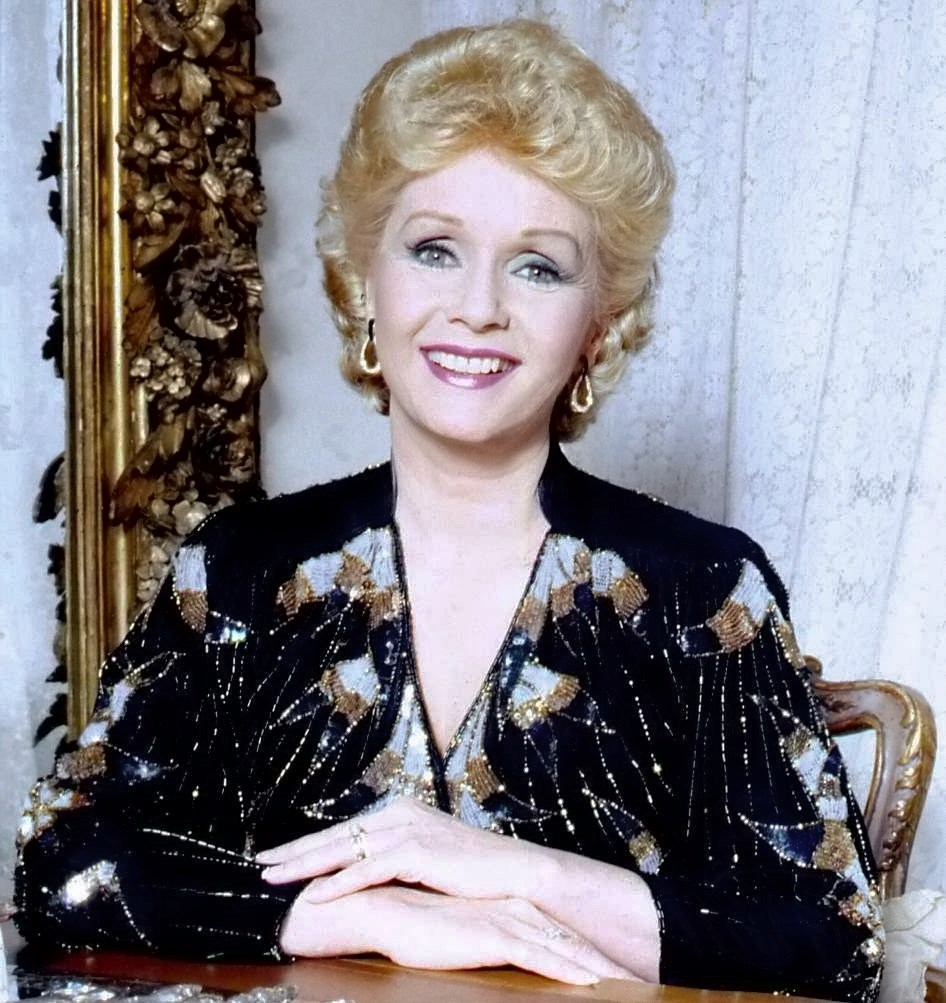
Debbie Reynolds

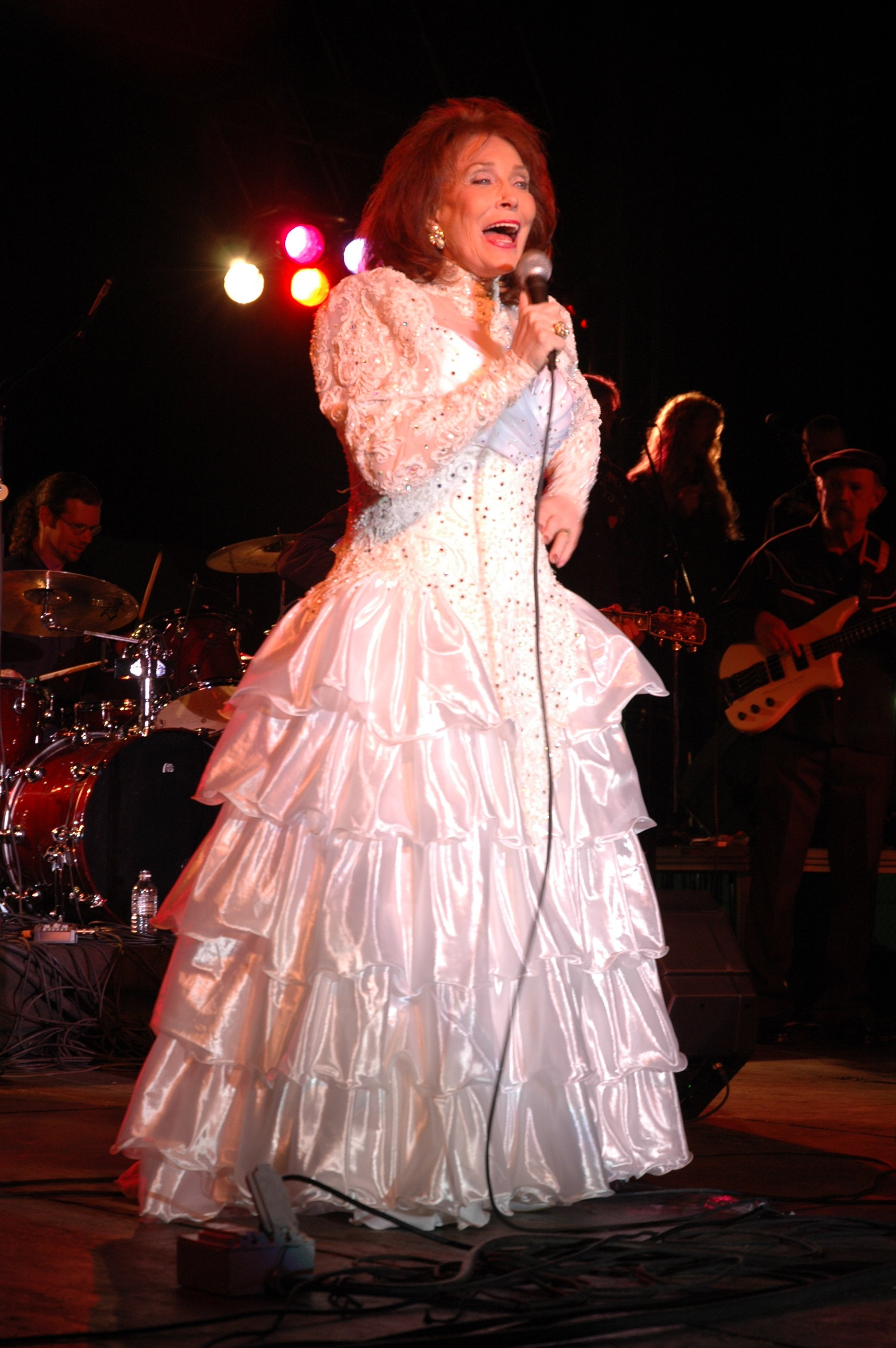
Loretta Lynn

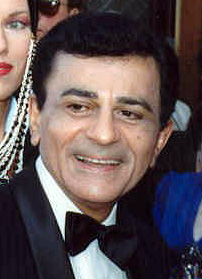
Casey Kasem

- April 1
  - Gordon Jump, American actor (d. 2003)
  - Debbie Reynolds, American actress, singer and dancer (d. 2016)
- April 2 – Edward Egan, American cardinal (d. 2015)
- April 3 – Colin Cantwell, American artist (d. 2022)
- April 4
  - Clive Davis, American record producer (d. 2026)
  - Richard Lugar, American politician (d. 2019)
  - Anthony Perkins, American actor (d. 1992)
- April 5 – Clemmie Spangler, American billionaire businessman and academic administrator (d. 2018)
- April 7
  - Del Monroe, American actor (d. 2009)
  - Cal Smith, American country music singer (d. 2013)
- April 9
  - Paul Krassner, American author, journalist, comedian and editor (d. 2019)
  - Carl Perkins, American rock singer (d. 1998)
- April 10 – Blaze Starr, American burlesque artist (d. 2015)
- April 11
  - Joel Grey, American actor, singer and dancer
  - Pat Koch Thaler, American educator and activist (d. 2024)
- April 12 – Tiny Tim, American musician (d. 1996)
- April 13 – Dick Farley, American basketball player (d. 1969)
- April 14 – Loretta Lynn, American country singer (d. 2022)
- April 16 – Bob Beckwith, American firefighter (September 11 attacks) (d. 2024)
- April 21 – Elaine May, American film director
- April 22 – Red Davis, American basketball player
- April 23 – Halston, American fashion designer (d. 1990)
- April 26 – Red Morrison, American basketball player (d. 2023)
- April 27 – Casey Kasem, American disc jockey and actor (d. 2014)

=== May ===
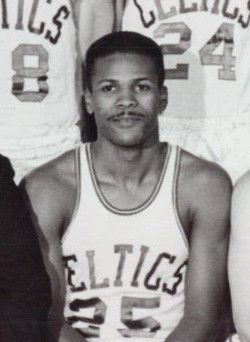
K. C. Jones

- May 2
  - Ed Bressoud, American baseball player (d. 2023)
  - Bruce Glover, American actor (d. 2025)
- May 4 – Susan Brown, American actress (d. 2018)
- May 7 – Pete Domenici, American politician (d. 2017)
- May 8 – Sonny Liston, American boxer (d. 1970)
- May 10 – Diane Washburn, American fashion model
- May 11 – John Vasconcellos, American lawyer and politician (d. 2014)
- May 16 – William J. Pulte, American real estate developer (d. 2018)
- May 17 – Chris Ballingall, American baseball player
- May 19 – Bill Fitch, American basketball coach (d. 2022)
- May 22 – Robert Spitzer, American psychiatrist (d. 2015)
- May 25
  - Roger Bowen, American comedic actor and novelist (d. 1996)
  - John Gregory Dunne, American novelist (d. 2003)
  - K. C. Jones, African-American basketball player and coach (d. 2020)
- May 26 – Joe Altobelli, American baseball player (d. 2021)
- May 29
  - Paul R. Ehrlich, American biologist
  - Richie Guerin, American basketball player and coach
  - Paul Parkman, American virologist (d. 2024)

=== June ===
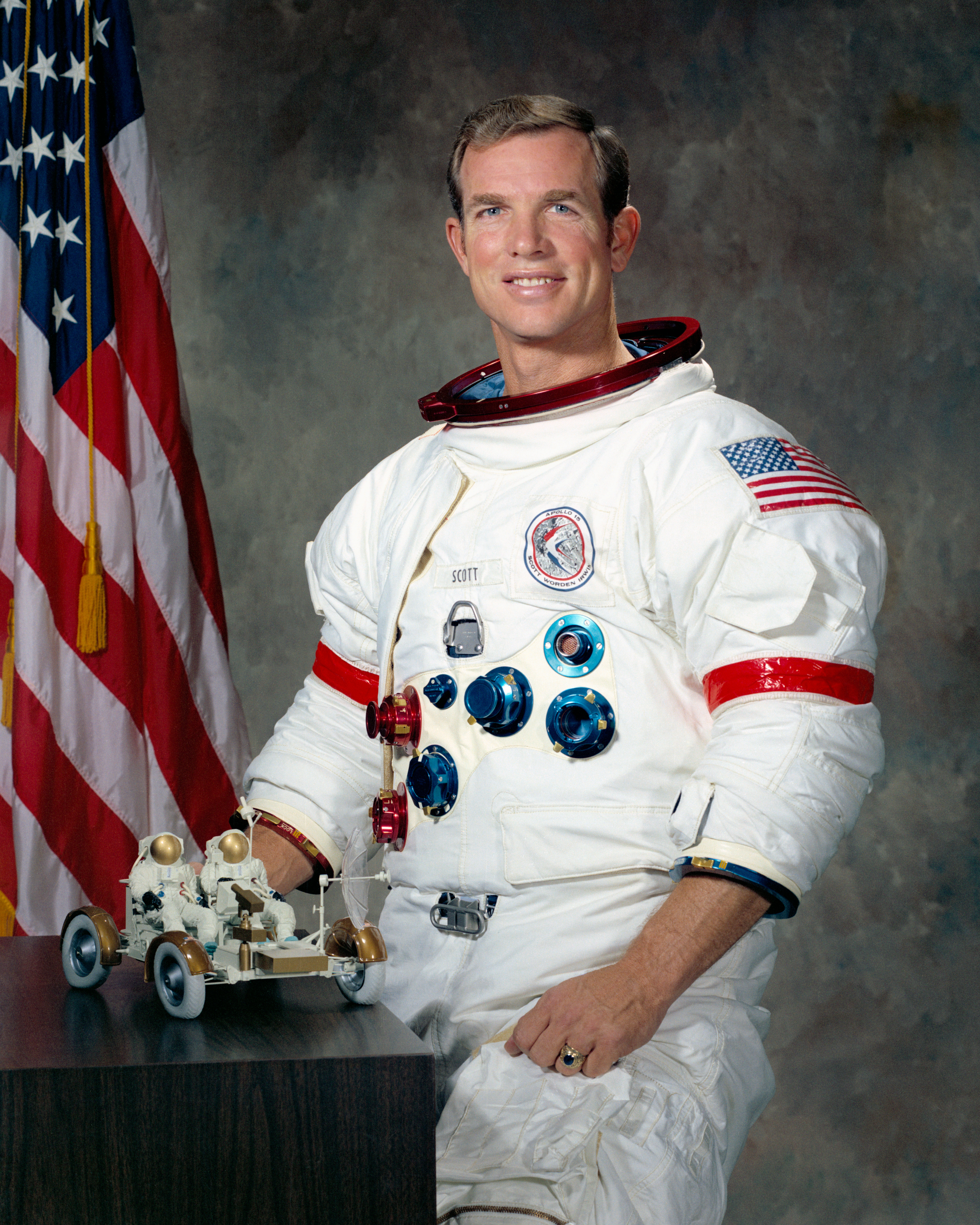
David Scott

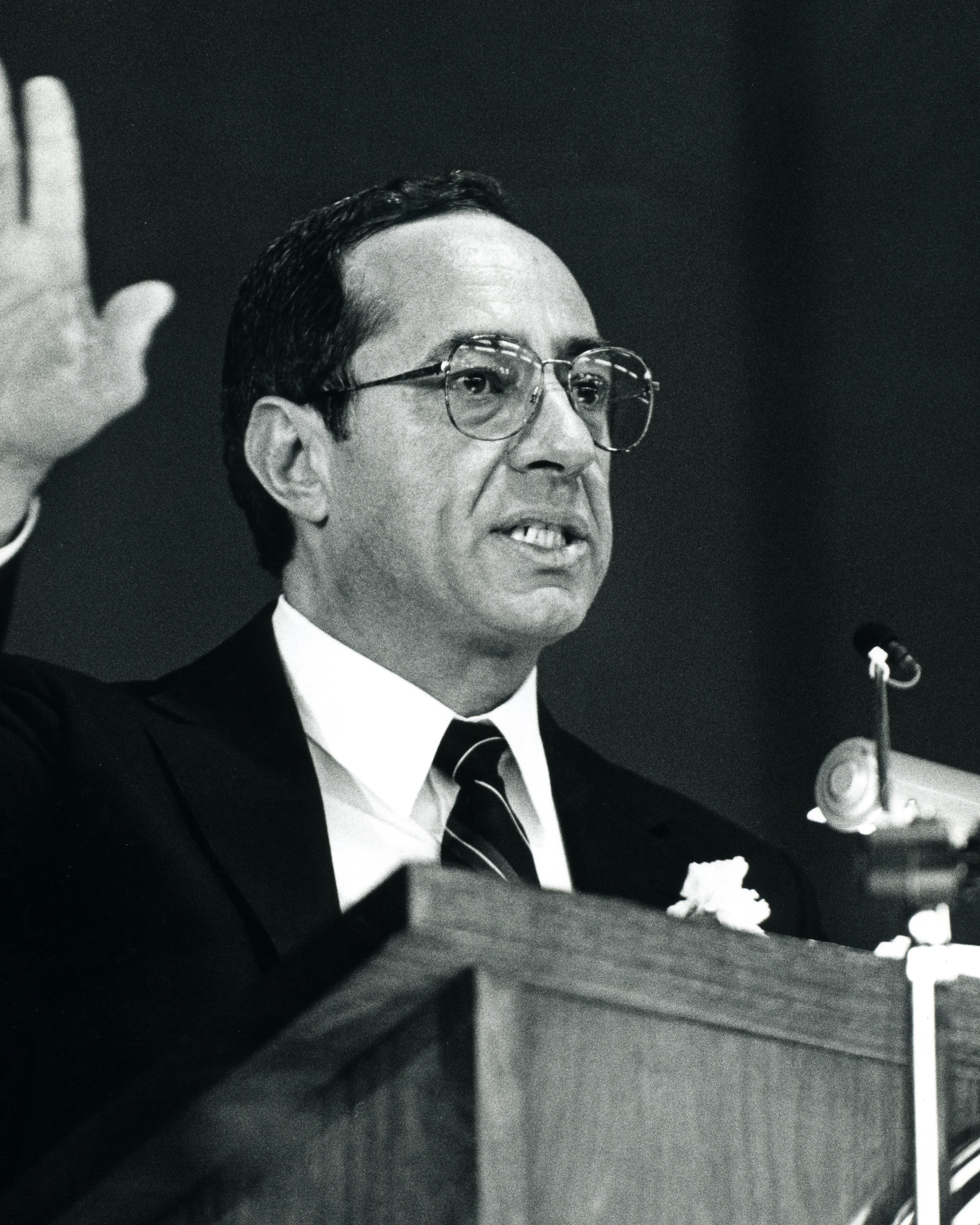
Mario Cuomo

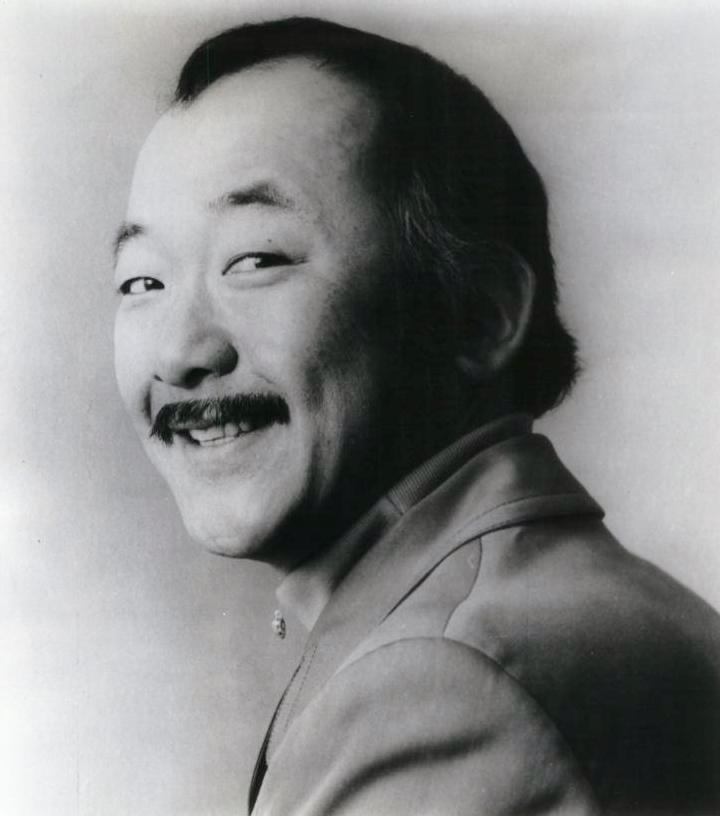
Pat Morita

- June 4 – John Drew Barrymore, American actor (d. 2004)
- June 6 – David Scott, American astronaut
- June 7 – Joe Collier, American football coach (d. 2024)
- June 10
  - J. Bennett Johnston, American politician
  - Gardner McKay, American actor (d. 2001)
- June 12 – Barbara Uehling, American educator and university administrator (d. 2020)
- June 13 – Bob McGrath, American actor (d. 2022)
- June 15 – Mario Cuomo, American politician (d. 2015)
- June 18 – Dudley R. Herschbach, American chemist, winner of the Nobel Prize in Chemistry in 1986
- June 21
  - Gene White, defensive back in the National Football League (d. 2017)
  - O. C. Smith, American musician (d. 2001)
- June 24 – Scott Marlowe, American actor (d. 2001)
- June 25
  - Julian Robertson, American billionaire hedge fund manager (d. 2022)
  - Hank Cicalo, American recording engineer (d. 2024)
- June 26
  - Don Valentine, American influential venture capitalist (d. 2019)
  - Marvin York, American politician (d. 2025)
- June 27
  - Eddie Kasko, American Major League Baseball (d. 2020)
  - Anna Moffo, American operatic soprano (d. 2006)
- June 28 – Pat Morita, Asian-American actor (d. 2005)
- June 29 – Alice Langtry, American politician (d. 2017)

=== July ===
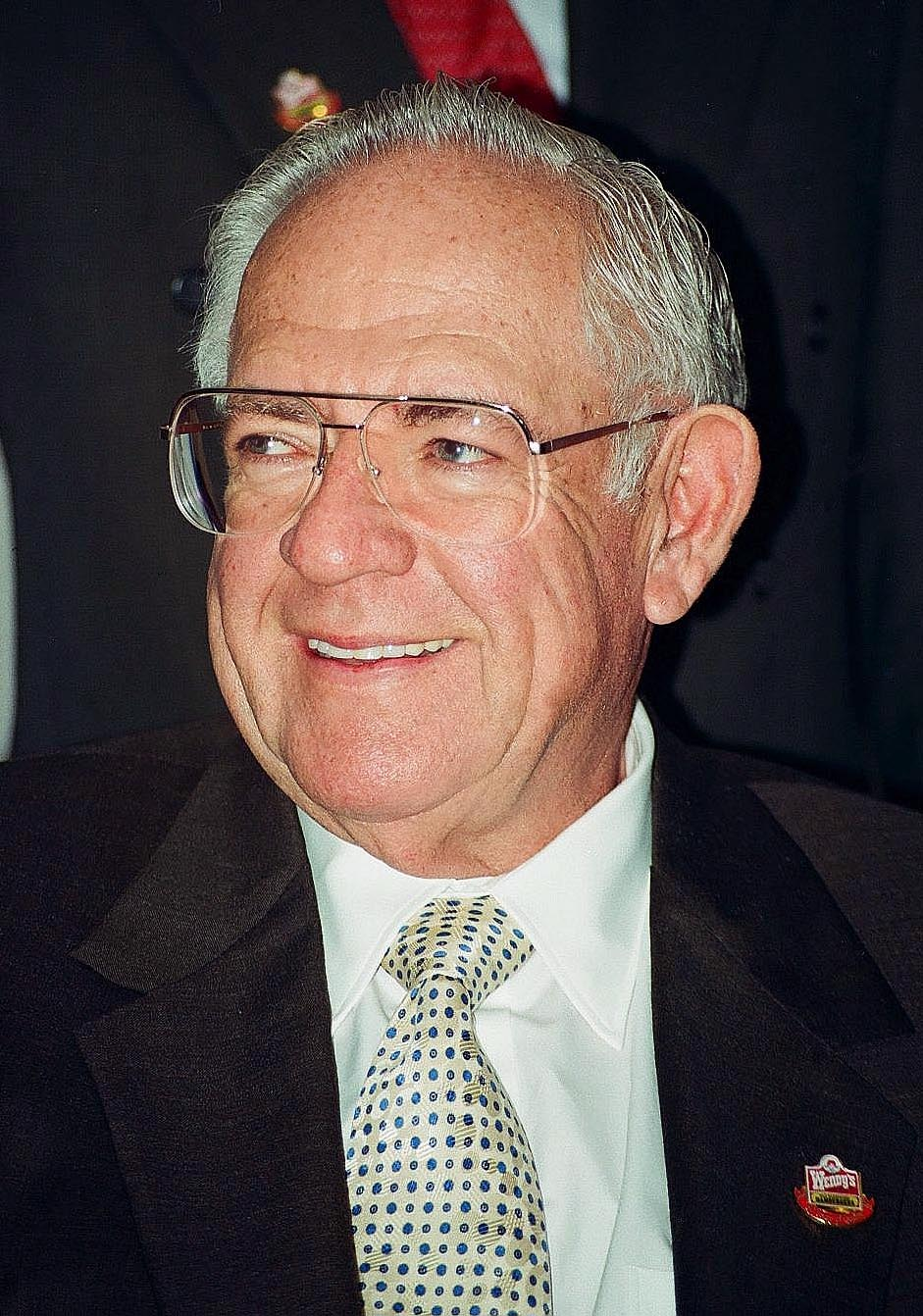
Dave Thomas

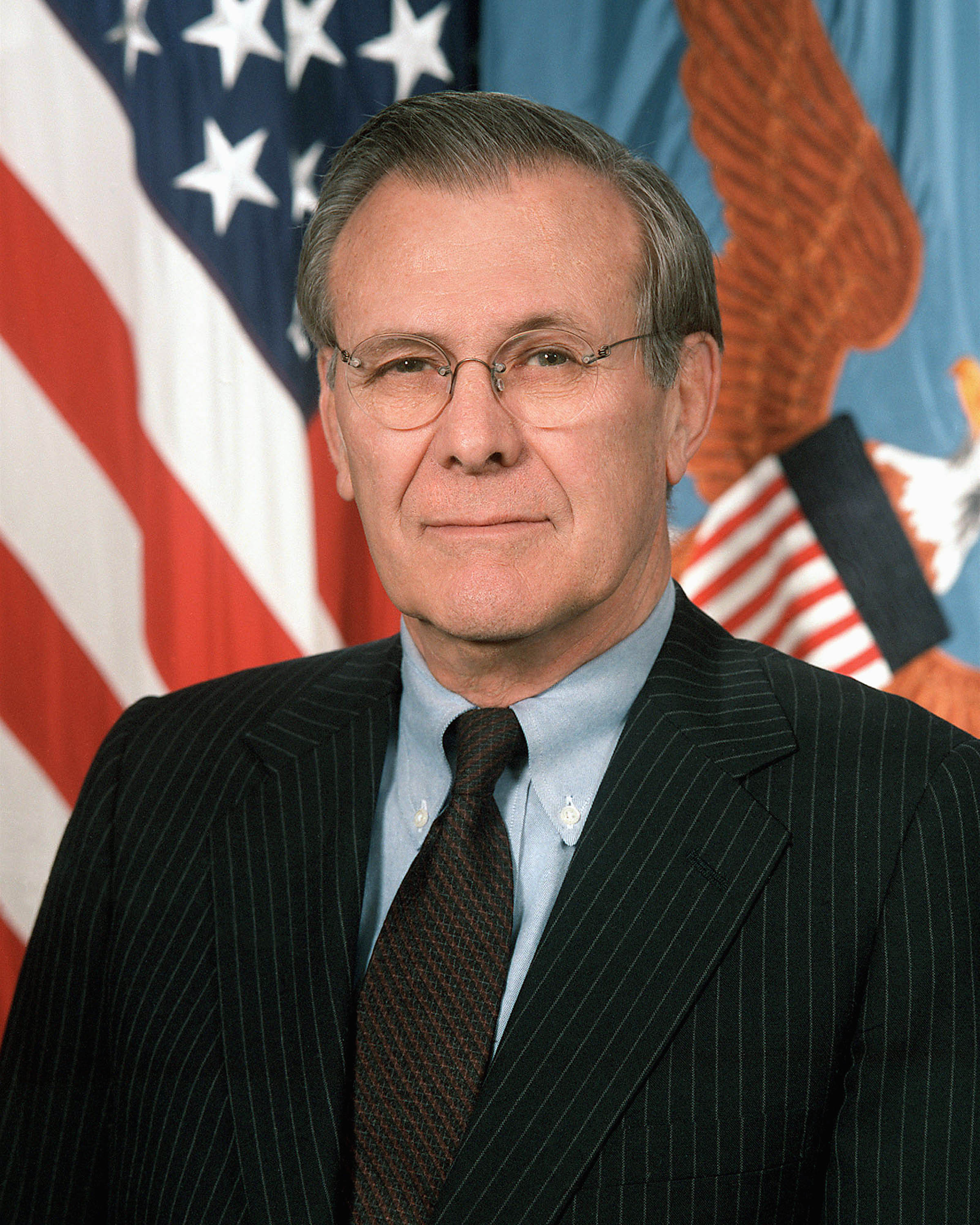
Donald Rumsfeld

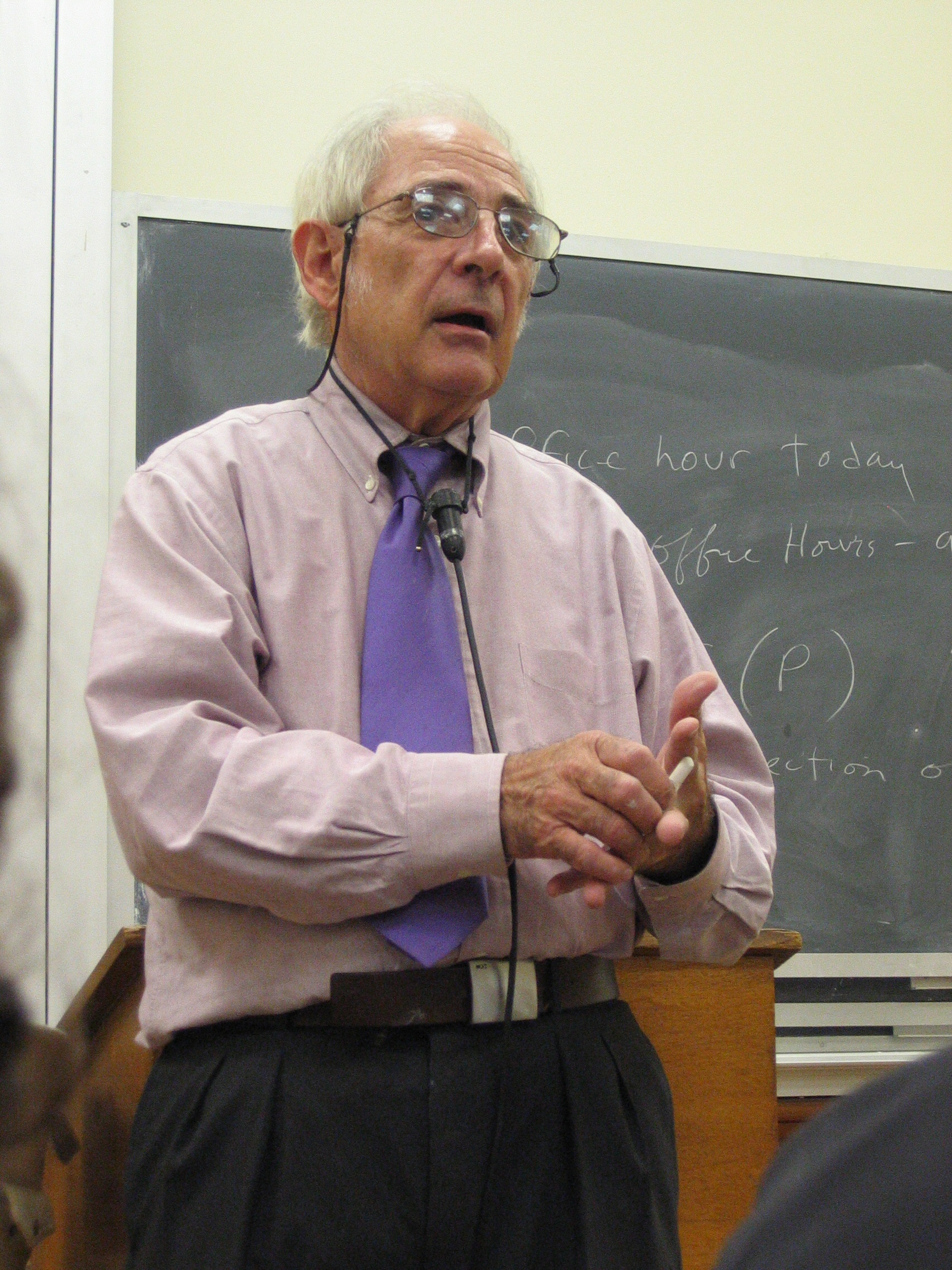
John Searle

- July 1
  - Rod Driver, British-born American mathematician (d. 2022)
  - Joseph Duffey, American academic, educator and political appointee (d. 2021)
- July 2 – Dave Thomas, American fast-food entrepreneur (d. 2002)
- July 3 – Bill Taylor, American politician (d. 2018)
- July 4 – Otis Young, African-American actor (d. 2001)
- July 5
  - Alan Cooke Kay, American lawyer and judge (d. 2024)
  - Victor Navasky, American journalist, editor and academic (d. 2023)
- July 8 – John Pascal, American writer (d. 1981)
- July 9 – Donald Rumsfeld, American politician, 13th & 21st United States Secretary of Defense (d. 2021)
- July 12 – Otis Davis, African-American 400 m runner, Olympic champion (1960) (d. 2024)
- July 16
  - Tim Asch, American anthropologist, photographer and ethnographic filmmaker (d. 1994)
  - Gary Bergen, American basketball player (d. 2010)
  - Max McGee, American football player (d. 2007)
  - Ron Marciniak, American football guard in the National Football League (d. 2020)
  - Dick Thornburgh, American lawyer and Republican politician (d. 2020)
- July 17
  - Red Kerr, American basketball player (d. 2009)
  - Karla Kuskin, American children's writer and illustrator (d. 2009)
  - Bobby Leonard, American basketball player (d. 2021)
- July 20 – Dick Giordano, American comic book artist and editor (d. 2010)
- July 21
  - Norman Geisler, American Christian author, theologian and philosopher (d. 2019)
  - Ernie Warlick, American football player (d. 2012)
- July 22 – Tom Robbins, American novelist (d. 2025)
- July 27 – Beverly Byron, American politician (d. 2025)
- July 29 – Nancy Kassebaum, American politician (d. 2026)
- July 31 – John Searle, American philosopher

=== August ===
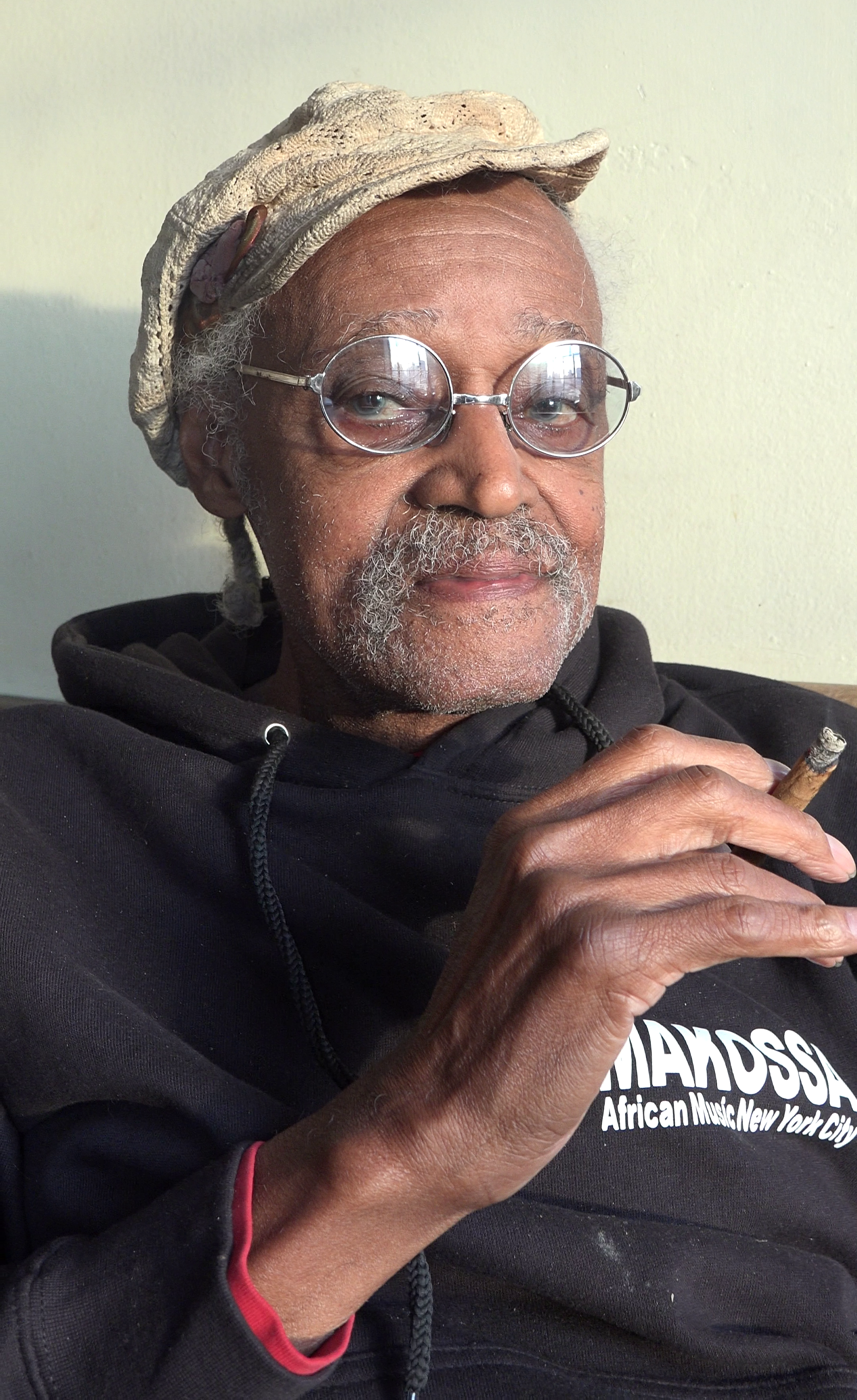
Melvin Van Peebles

- August 1 – Meir Kahane, American-born Israeli rabbi and ultra-nationalist writer and political figure (d. 1990 in Israel)
- August 2
  - John Cohen, American folk musician and photographer (d. 2019)
  - Lamar Hunt, American sports promoter (d. 2006)
- August 3 – Bob Carney, American basketball player (d. 2011)
- August 5 – Ja'Net DuBois, American actress, singer, dancer (d. 2020)
- August 7 – Maurice Rabb Jr., African-American ophthalmologist (d. 2005)
- August 8
  - John Culver, American politician (d. 2018)
  - Mel Tillis, American country singer (d. 2017)
- August 12 – Charlie O'Donnell, American game show announcer (d. 2010)
- August 14 – James V. Hansen, American politician (d. 2018)
- August 15
  - Abby Dalton, American actress (d. 2020)
  - Robert L. Forward, American science fiction author and physicist (d. 2002)
  - Jim Lange, American-Canadian disc jockey and game show host (d. 2014)
- August 16 – Pervis Spann, African-American radio broadcaster (d. 2022)
- August 20 – Bill Hudson, American civil rights photojournalist (d. 2010)
- August 21
  - George Abbey, American NASA administrator (d. 2024)
  - Melvin Van Peebles, African-American actor, filmmaker, playwright, novelist and composer (d. 2021)
- August 26 – Joe Engle, American astronaut (d. 2024)

=== September ===
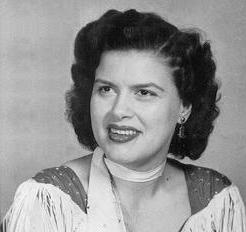
Patsy Cline

- September 1 – Sunny von Bülow, socialite (d. 2008)
- September 3 – Eileen Brennan, actress and singer (d. 2013)
- September 4 – Vince Dooley, American football coach (d. 2022)
- September 5 – Carol Lawrence, actress, singer and dancer
- September 6 – Marguerite Pearson, baseball player (d. 2005)
- September 7
  - John Paul Getty Jr., American-born philanthropist (d. 2003)
  - Mary Previte, politician (d. 2019)
- September 8 – Patsy Cline, country singer (d. 1963)
- September 9 – Bill Porter, salesman (d. 2013)
- September 11
  - Bob Packwood, politician (d. 2026)
  - Art Spoelstra, basketball player (d. 2008)
- September 13
  - Whitey Bell, basketball player (d. 2025)
  - Dick Biondi, disc jockey (d. 2023)
- September 14 – Josh Culbreath, Olympic athlete (d. 2021)
- September 17
  - John R. Casani, NASA engineer (d. 2025)
  - Doyle Corman, politician (d. 2019)
- September 21 – Mickey Kuhn, child actor (d. 2022)
- September 24
  - Anthony Michael Milone, Roman Catholic prelate (d. 2018)
  - Jackie Moore, basketball player
- September 26
  - Donna Douglas, actress (The Beverly Hillbillies) (d. 2015)
  - Richard Herd, actor (d. 2020)
- September 27 – Oliver E. Williamson, economist (d. 2020)

=== October ===
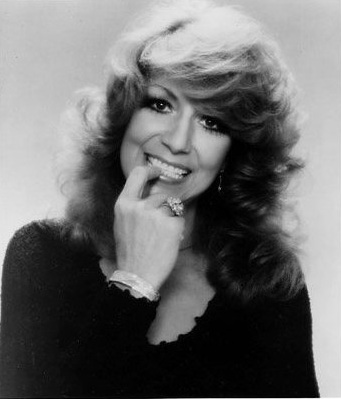
Dottie West

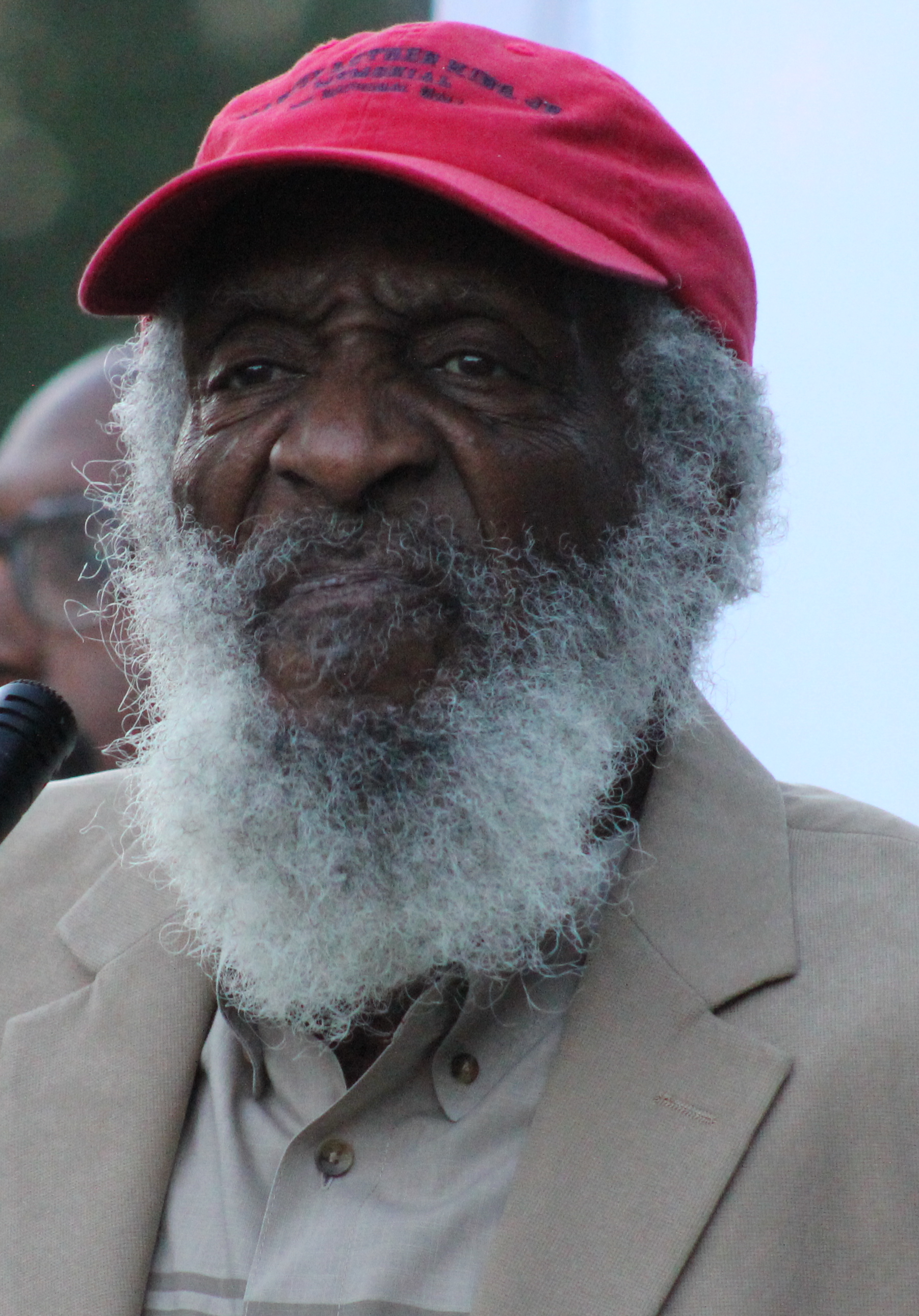
Dick Gregory

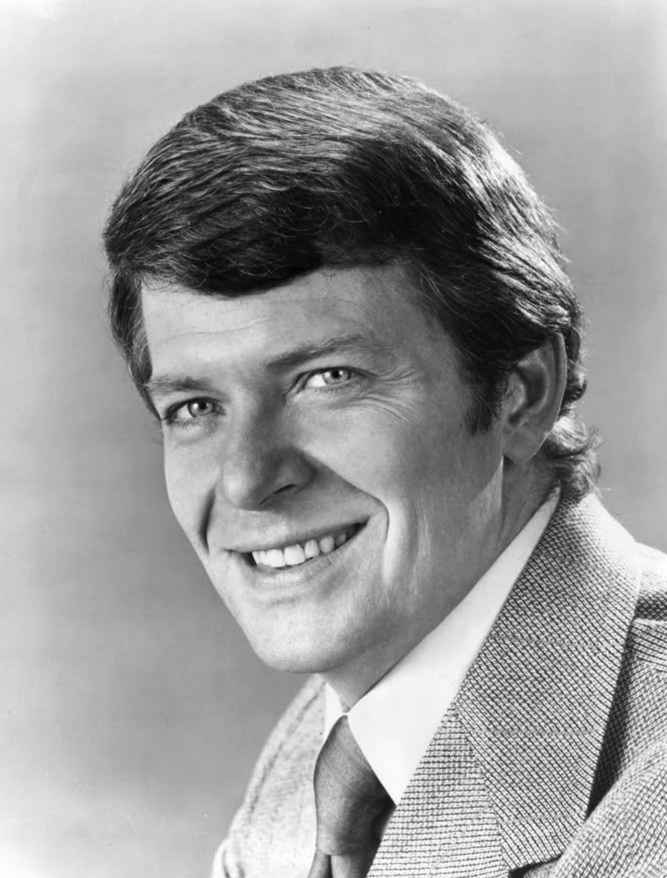
Robert Reed

- October 1 – Albert Collins, African-American blues guitarist and singer (d. 1993)
- October 2 – Maury Wills, baseball player and manager (d. 2022)
- October 3 – Joe Morgenstern, film critic and journalist
- October 4
  - Stan Dragoti, film director (d. 2018)
  - Felicia Farr, actress and model
- October 9
  - David Plowden, photographer (d. 2026)
  - Judy Tyler, actress (d. 1957)
- October 11 – Dottie West, country music singer and songwriter (d. 1991)
- October 12
  - Jake Garn, politician
  - Dick Gregory, African-American comedian and civil rights activist (d. 2017)
  - Ned Jarrett, racing driver and broadcaster
- October 13
  - Belva Davis, African-American broadcaster and journalist (d. 2025)
  - Ed Kalafat, basketball player (d. 2019)
  - Jean Edward Smith, political scientist and biographer (d. 2019)
  - John G. Thompson, mathematician
- October 15 – Bill Rasmussen, sports director (d. 2026)
- October 17 – Paul Anderson, weightlifter (d. 1994)
- October 19 – Robert Reed, American actor (The Brady Bunch) (d. 1992)
- October 20
  - William Christopher, American actor (M*A*S*H) (d. 2016)
  - Rosey Brown, American football player (d. 2004)
- October 22 – Barboura Morris, American actress (d. 1975)
- October 24 – Foster Diebold, American academic (d. 2018)
- October 27
  - Sylvia Plath, American poet (d. 1963 in the United Kingdom)
  - Chuck Stobart, American football player and coach (d. 2022)
- October 28 – Suzy Parker, American fashion model and actress (d. 2003)
- October 29 – Dick Garmaker, American basketball player (d. 2020)
- October 29 – Velma Barfield, American serial killer who murders at least six (d. 1984)
- October 30 – Bob Koester, record producer and businessman (d. 2021)

=== November ===
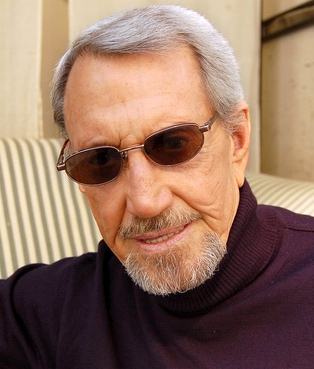
Roy Scheider

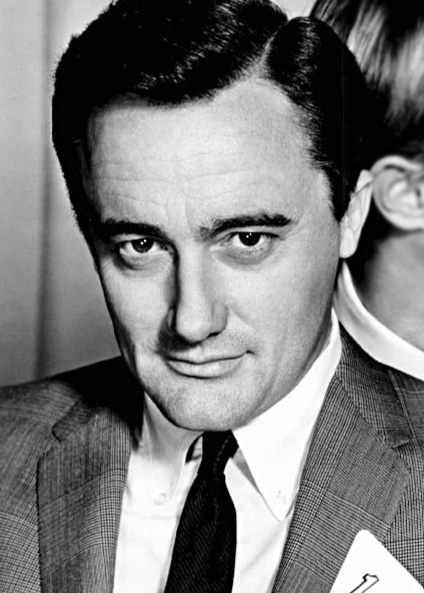
Robert Vaughn

- November 2 – Guy Sparrow, American basketball player
- November 3 – Thomas J. Manton, politician (d. 2006)
- November 4 – Noam Pitlik, actor and director (d. 1999)
- November 5 – Ed Badger, college and professional basketball coach
- November 6
  - Stonewall Jackson, country singer (d. 2021)
  - Eugene H. Peterson, clergyman and biblical scholar (d. 2018)
- November 8
  - Ben Bova, science writer (d. 2020)
  - Andy Johnson, American basketball player (d. 2002)
- November 9 – Frank Selvy, American basketball player (d. 2024)
- November 10 – Roy Scheider, American actor and amateur boxer (d. 2008)
- November 12 – Jerry Douglas, American actor (d. 2021)
- November 13
  - Willie Edwards, murder victim (d. 1957)
  - Richard Mulligan, American actor (d. 2000)
- November 15
  - Clyde McPhatter, American singer (d. 1972)
  - Emily Meggett, American Geechee-Gullah community leader (d. 2023)
- November 22 – Robert Vaughn, American actor (d. 2016)
- November 24 – Johnny Horan, American basketball player (d. 1980)
- November 28
  - Midge Costanza, American social and political activist (d. 2010)
  - Ethel Ennis, African American jazz singer (d. 2019)

=== December ===
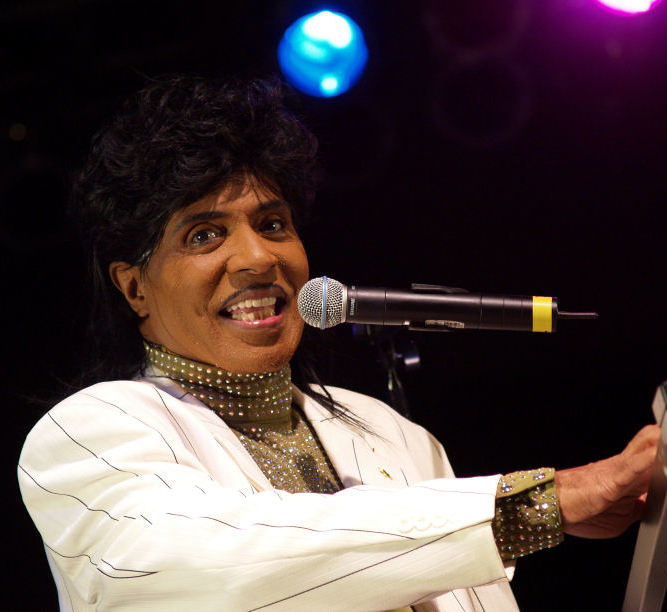
Little Richard

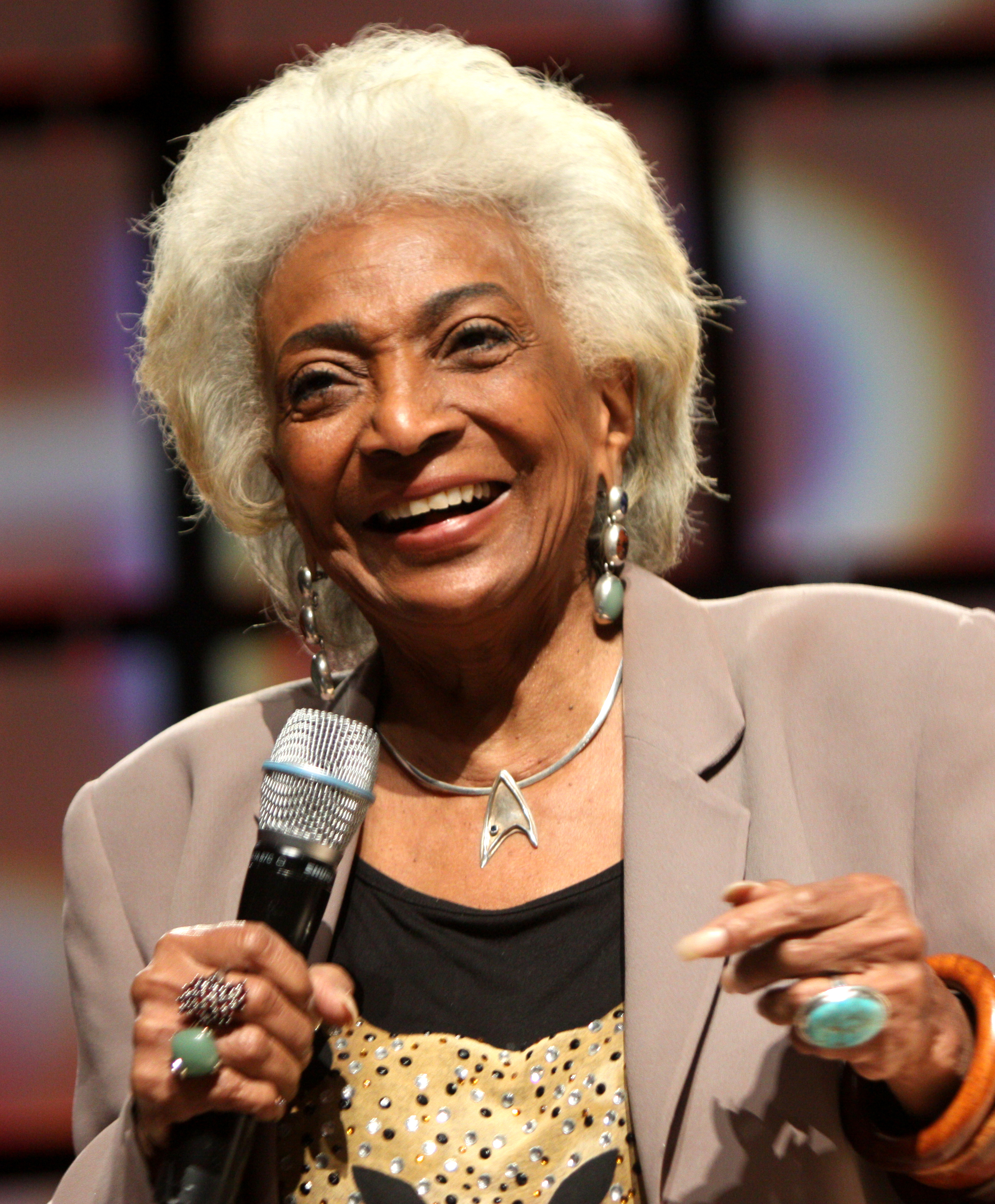
Nichelle Nichols

- December 5
  - Sheldon Glashow, physicist
  - Little Richard, singer, songwriter, and musician (d. 2020)
- December 7
  - Ellen Burstyn, actress
  - Paul Caponigro, photographer (d. 2024)
- December 9 – Bill Hartack, jockey (d. 2007)
- December 12 – Bob Pettit, basketball player
- December 17 – Kelly E. Taggart, admiral and civil engineer (d. 2014)
- December 19 – Jim Paxson Sr., basketball player (d. 2014)
- December 18 – Roger Smith, actor (d. 2017)
- December 21 – Edward Hoagland, essayist
- December 24 – Earl Dodge, temperance movement leader (d. 2007)
- December 25 – Janie Lou Gibbs, serial killer who murdered five of her relatives (d. 2010)
- December 28 – Nichelle Nichols, African American actress (d. 2022)
- December 29 – Inga Swenson, actress and singer (d. 2023)

== Deaths ==
- January 12 – James Felts, newspaper editor and politician (born 1866)
- January 26 – William Wrigley Jr., chewing gum manufacturer (born 1861)
- January 27 – Ed Appleton, baseball player (born 1892)
- February 8 – Mad Dog Coll, hitman (shot) (born 1908 in Ireland)
- February 15 – Minnie Maddern Fiske, stage actress (born 1865)
- March 1 – Frank Teschemacher, jazz woodwind player (automobile accident) (born 1906)
- March 6 – John Philip Sousa, composer and conductor, "the march king" ("The Stars and Stripes Forever") (born 1854)
- March 14 – George Eastman, photographic inventor (Eastman Kodak) (suicide) (born 1854)
- March 18 – Chauncey Olcott, musical theater actor (born 1858)
- March 31 – Eben Byers, steel tycoon and socialite (radiation poisoning) (born 1880)
- April 2 – Bill Pickett, African American cowboy of slave ancestry (born 1870)
- April 15 – A. J. Rosier, politician, assassinated (b. 1880)
- April 22 – J. Warren Keifer, Union army officer and politician (born 1836)
- April 27 – Hart Crane, poet (born 1899)
- May 3 – Charles Fort, researcher of the unusual (born 1874)
- May 30 – John Hubbard, admiral (born 1849)
- June 21 – Major Taylor, racing cyclist (born 1878)
- June 26 – Adelaide Ames, astronomer (born 1900)
- June 27 – Francis P. Duffy, Roman Catholic priest (born 1871 in Canada)
- July 7 – Henry Eyster Jacobs, Lutheran theologian (born 1844)
- July 22 – Florenz Ziegfeld Jr., Broadway theatrical impresario (born 1867)
- July 24 – Cynthia S. Burnett, educator, temperance reformer, and newspaper editor (born 1840)
- August 2 – Dan Brouthers, baseball player (born 1858)
- August 25 – Edith Rockefeller McCormick, socialite, daughter of Standard Oil co-founder John D. Rockefeller (born 1872)
- September 5 – Paul Bern, screenwriter (suicide) (born 1889)
- September 22 – Claude C. Hopkins, advertising executive (born 1866)
- September 25 – Joel R. P. Pringle, admiral (born 1873)
- September 27 – John Sharp Williams, U.S. Senator from Mississippi from 1911 to 1923 (born 1854)
- October 17 – Lucy Bacon, painter (born 1857)
- October 22 – Anna Elizabeth Dickinson, abolitionist and women's rights advocate (born 1842)
- October 26 – Molly Brown, Denver socialite, survivor of the sinking of the RMS Titanic (born 1867)
- November 4 – Belle Bennett, actress (cancer) (born 1891)
- November 15 or 17 – Charles W. Chesnutt, African American author, essayist and political activist (born 1858)
- November 18 – Jay Hunt, American film director (born 1855)
- November 22 – William Walker Atkinson, writer and occultist (born 1862)
- November 23 – Henry S. Whitehead, writer of horror fiction and fantasy (born 1882)
- December 28 – Malcolm Whitman, tennis player (born 1877)

== Anniversaries ==
- February 22 marked the 200th anniversary of George Washington's birth. Saplings and scions of the Washington Elm tree were planted across the United States in his honor.

== See also ==
- List of American films of 1932
- Timeline of United States history (1930–1949)
