= 2012 Pennsylvania Auditor General election =

- November 6, 2012
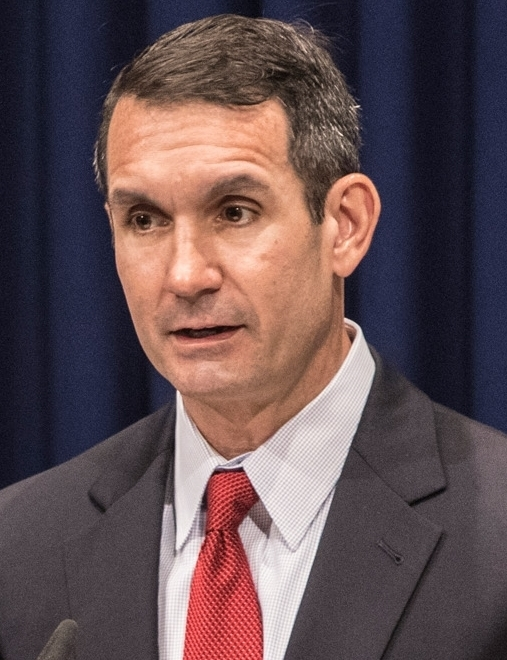

Nominee	Eugene DePasquale	John Maher
Party	Democratic	Republican
Popular vote	2,729,565	2,548,767
Percentage	49.73%	46.43%
- DePasquale: 40–50% 50–60% 60–70% 80–90% Maher: 40–50% 50–60% 60–70% 70–80%
Auditor General before election
Jack Wagner
Democratic
Elected Auditor General
Eugene DePasquale
Democratic

The Pennsylvania Auditor General election of 2012 was held on November 6, 2012. The primary election was held on April 24, 2012.

== Candidates ==
John Maher, State Representative for the 40th district defeated Frank Pinto, a former banking lobbyist, in the Republican primary. Eugene DePasquale, State Representative for the 95th district, ran unopposed in the Democratic primary. Betsy Elizabeth Summers was the Libertarian candidate.

== Results ==
On November 6, 2012, Eugene DePasquale defeated John Maher to be elected Auditor General of Pennsylvania.

2012 Pennsylvania Auditor General election
Party	Candidate	Votes	%
Democratic	Eugene DePasquale	2,729,565	49.73
Republican	John Maher	2,548,767	46.43
Libertarian	Betsy Elizabeth Summers	210,876	3.84
Total votes		5,489,208	100.00
Margin of victory		180,798	3.30
Democratic hold			

=== By congressional district ===
Despite losing the state, Maher won 13 of the 18 congressional districts.

District	DePasquale	Maher	Representative
1st	80%	18%	Bob Brady
2nd	89%	10%	Chaka Fattah
3rd	41%	54%	Mike Kelly
4th	41%	55%	Jason Altmire
4th	41%	55%	Scott Perry
5th	38%	56%	Glenn Thompson
6th	43%	53%	Jim Gerlach
7th	43%	54%	Pat Meehan
8th	46%	51%	Mike Fitzpatrick
9th	37%	58%	Bill Shuster
10th	35%	59%	Tom Marino
11th	42%	52%	Lou Barletta
12th	43%	53%	Mark Critz
12th	43%	53%	Keith Rothfus
13th	64%	35%	Allyson Schwartz
14th	68%	28%	Mike Doyle
15th	45%	52%	Charlie Dent
16th	41%	54%	Joe Pitts
17th	53%	42%	Tim Holden
17th	53%	42%	Matt Cartwright
18th	42%	54%	Tim Murphy
