= 2017 Northampton County Executive election =

- November 7, 2017

Nominee	Lamont McClure	John Brown
Party	Democratic	Republican
Popular vote	22,520	19,307
Percentage	53.81%	46.13%
County Executive before election
John Brown
Republican
Elected County Executive
Lamont McClure
Republican

The 2017 Northampton County Executive election was held on November 7, 2017. Incumbent Republican County Executive John Brown, who was the unsuccessful Republican nominee for Auditor General in 2016, ran for re-election to a second term. He won the Republican nomination unopposed and faced former County Councilman Lamont McClure, the Democratic nominee, in the general election. McClure defeated Brown by a wide margin, winning 54 percent of the vote to Brown's 46 percent.

== Democratic primary ==
=== Candidates ===
- Lamont McClure, former County Councilman

=== Results ===
Democratic primary results
Party	Candidate	Votes	%
Democratic	Lamont McClure	9,722	99.62%
Democratic	Write-ins	37	0.38%
Total votes		9,759	100.00%

== Republican primary ==
=== Candidates ===
- John Brown, incumbent County Executive

=== Results ===
Republican primary results
Party	Candidate	Votes	%
Republican	John Brown (incumbent)	6,732	99.31%
Republican	Write-ins	47	1.29%
Total votes		6,779	100.00%

== General election ==
=== Results ===
2017 Northampton County Executive election
Party	Candidate	Votes	%
Democratic	Lamont McClure	22,520	53.81%
Republican	John Brown (incumbent)	19,307	46.13%
Write-in		26	0.06%
Total votes		41,853	100.00%
Democratic gain from Republican			
