= Michael Bortner =

American politician (born 1949)

Michael E. Bortner

Member of the Pennsylvania Senate from the 28th district
- In office January 1, 1991 – November 30, 1994
- Preceded by: Ralph Hess
- Succeeded by: Dan Delp

Member of the Pennsylvania House of Representatives from the 95th district
- In office January 1, 1985 – November 30, 1990
- Preceded by: Stanford Lehr
- Succeeded by: Stephen Stetler

Personal details
- Born: February 11, 1949 (age 77) Spring Grove, Pennsylvania
- Party: Democratic

Michael E. Bortner (born February 11, 1949) is a retired American judge and politician who sat on the York County, Pennsylvania Court of Common Pleas from 2004 to 2021. He previously served in the Pennsylvania House of Representatives from 1985 to 1990 and in the Pennsylvania State Senate from 1991 to 1994.
