= Pennsylvania House of Representatives, District 40 =

American legislative district

Pennsylvania's 40th State House of Representatives district
Representative
Natalie Mihalek; R–Upper St. Clair
- Population (2022): 66,305

The 40th Pennsylvania House of Representatives District is located in southwest Pennsylvania and has been represented since 2019 by Natalie Mihalek.

== District profile ==
The 40th Pennsylvania House of Representatives District is located in Allegheny County and Washington County and includes the following areas:

Allegheny County

- Bethel Park
- Upper St. Clair Township (part)
  - Wards 03 (part)
    - Division 01
    - Division 02
  - Ward 04 (part)
    - Divisions 02
    - Division 03
    - Division 04
  - Ward 05

Washington County

- Peters Township

== Representatives ==
Representative	Party	Years	District home	Note
Prior to 1969, seats were apportioned by county.
Donald O. Bair	Republican	1969 – 1970		
Jay R. Wells, III	Republican	1971 – 1974		
D. Michael Fisher	Republican	1975 – 1980		Elected to the Pennsylvania Senate
Frank J. Marmion, Jr.	Republican	1981 – 1984		
Alice S. Langtry	Republican	1985 – 1992		
Albert W. Pettit	Republican	1993 – 1997		Died on June 5, 1997
John A. Maher	Republican	1997 – 2019	Upper St. Clair Township	Elected on September 9, 1997 to fill vacancy.
Natalie Mihalek	Republican	2019 – present	Upper St. Clair Township	Incumbent

== Recent election results ==
PA House election, 2024: Pennsylvania House, District 40
Party	Candidate	Votes	%
Republican	Natalie Mihalek (incumbent)	25,165	60.37
Democratic	Peter Kohnke	16,518	39.63
Total votes		41,683	100.00
Republican hold			

PA House election, 2022: Pennsylvania House, District 40
Party	Candidate	Votes	%
Republican	Natalie Mihalek (incumbent)	20,331	56.80
Democratic	Christopher Todd	15,464	43.20
Total votes		35,795	100.00
Republican hold			

PA House election, 2018: Pennsylvania House, District 40
Party	Candidate	Votes	%
Republican	Natalie Mihalek	18,730	56.07
Democratic	Sharon Guidi	14,674	43.93
Total votes		33,404	100.00
Republican hold			

PA House election, 2016: Pennsylvania House, District 40
Party	Candidate	Votes	%
Republican	John Maher (incumbent)	24,389	65.03
Democratic	Andrew Zahalsky	13,115	34.97
Total votes		37,504	100.00
Republican hold			
