= Albert Pettit =

American politician

Albert W. Pettit

Member of the Pennsylvania House of Representatives from the 40th district
- In office January 5, 1993 – June 5, 1997
- Preceded by: Alice Langtry
- Succeeded by: John Maher

Personal details
- Born: October 18, 1930
- Died: June 7, 1997 (aged 66)
- Party: Republican

Albert W. Pettit (October 18, 1930 – June 5, 1997) is a former Republican member of the Pennsylvania House of Representatives.
