= Stephen Stetler =

American politician (born 1949)

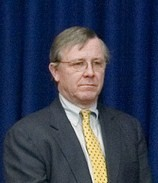
- Stetler in 2006

Secretary of Revenue of Pennsylvania
- In office March 31, 2009 – December 15, 2009
- Governor: Ed Rendell
- Preceded by: Tom Wolf
- Succeeded by: Dan Meuser^{[a]}

Member of the Pennsylvania House of Representatives from the 95th district
- In office January 1, 1991 – September 29, 2006
- Preceded by: Michael Bortner
- Succeeded by: Eugene DePasquale

Personal details
- Born: Stephen Hays Stetler; July 5, 1949 (age 77) York, Pennsylvania, U.S.
- Party: Democratic
- Spouse: Polly Stetler
- Children: 2 children
- Education: Drew University, Johns Hopkins University
- Occupation: Politician
- a. C. Daniel Hassell served as acting secretary from Stetler's resignation in 2009 until Meuser's nomination in 2011.

Stephen Hays Stetler (born July 5, 1949) is a Democratic politician from Pennsylvania who served as Secretary of the Pennsylvania Department of Revenue from March 2009 until his resignation in December of that year.

He stepped-down hours before he was indicted by a grand jury on various charges of theft and conflict of interest that were brought by the office of Attorney General Tom Corbett.

== Education and teaching career ==
A native of York, Pennsylvania, he attended St. James School, a private Episcopal boarding school in Maryland. He earned an undergraduate degree from Drew University in 1971. In 1974, he earned a Master of Divinity from Drew University. In 1983, he earned a M.S. in Administrative Science from Johns Hopkins University. He then studied canon law at Ripon Hall in Oxford, England and took a teaching position at the National Cathedral School in Washington, D.C.

== Business and legislative career ==
Stetler left teaching in 1977 and moved to Harrisburg to begin working for the Pennsylvania Department of Revenue. He stayed at the Department for 12 years and was eventually promoted to Deputy Secretary of Taxation, a position giving him supervision of 1,800 employees. It was during this time that Stetler attended Johns Hopkins University. He then returned to York, Pennsylvania to become a partner in D.E. Stetler and Son, his family's Dodge auto dealership.

During the 1990 election, Stetler successfully ran to represent the York-centric 95th legislative district in the Pennsylvania House of Representatives, which had been vacated by Michael E. Bortner, who was a candidate for the Pennsylvania State Senate. In 2003, the political website PoliticsPA named him as a possible successor to House Minority Leader Bill DeWeese. He was elected House Democratic Policy Committee Chairman in 2003, making him part of the caucus leadership. During that time, he was also chairman of the House Democratic Campaign Committee, a political position within the caucus that placed him in charge of the election efforts for many House Democratic candidates. As a member of the board of Pennsylvania Higher Education Assistance Agency, a governmental student financial aid organization, Stetler and his wife were criticized for "posh" accommodations and retreats that were paid for with PHEAA funds.

Stetler did not run for re-election during the 2006 general election, at least partially because of voter backlash over his vote in favor of the 2005 General Assembly pay raise. He resigned his seat in September in order to become executive director of the Pennsylvania Economy League.

== Tenure as Secretary of Revenue ==
In November 2008, he was named Secretary of the Pennsylvania Department of Revenue, succeeding Thomas W. Wolf. He was unanimously confirmed by the Pennsylvania State Senate on March 31, 2009. He resigned that position on December 15, 2009, hours before being charged with one count of conflict of interest, four counts of theft, and one count of criminal conspiracy by Pennsylvania Attorney General Tom Corbett (R), who has been investigating the practices of the House Democratic Caucus as a part of the "Bonusgate" investigations. According to state prosecutors, Stetler had "required members of his staff to conduct campaign work on legislative time" while chair of the House Policy Committee. Stetler was found guilty and sentenced to 1 1/2 years to 5 years in prison.

However, he has appealed his conviction and was granted a new trial in April, 2017. An appeal by the PA Attorney General to dismiss the appeal was denied by the PA Supreme Court.

On July 12, 2019, after Mr. Stetler's convictions were vacated and Mr. Stetler was awarded a new trial, Mr. Stetler entered a no contest plea to an ungraded misdemeanor offense of Failure to File Report; the remaining counts of which Mr. Stetler were previously convicted were vacated in their entirety and dismissed with prejudice.
