= Frank Marmion =

American politician

Frank J. Marmion, Jr.

Member of the Pennsylvania House of Representatives from the 40th district
- In office January 4, 1981 – November 30, 1984
- Preceded by: Mike Fisher
- Succeeded by: Alice Langtry

Personal details
- Born: April 2, 1917
- Died: February 1, 1997 (aged 79) Pittsburgh, Pennsylvania, United States
- Party: Republican

Frank J. Marmion, Jr. (April 2, 1917 – February 1, 1997) is a former Republican member of the Pennsylvania House of Representatives.
