= Carol Hill-Evans =

American politician (born 1949)

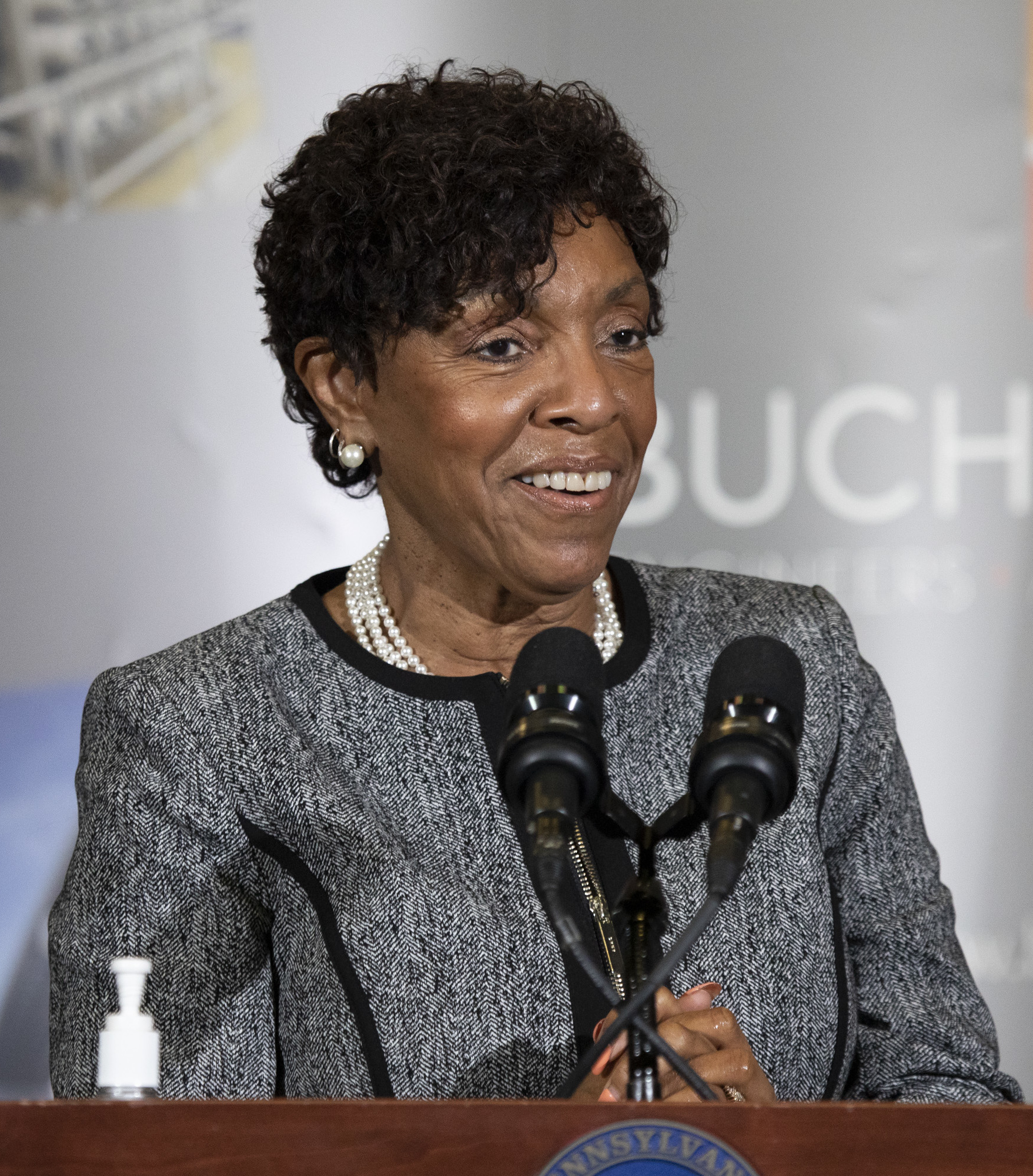

Member of the Pennsylvania House of Representatives from the 95th district
- Incumbent
- Assumed office January 3, 2017
- Preceded by: Kevin J. Schreiber

Personal details
- Born: November 21, 1949 (age 76) York, Pennsylvania, U.S.
- Party: Democratic
- Education: Pennsylvania State University (BS)

Carol Hill-Evans (born November 21, 1949) is an American politician who has served in the Pennsylvania House of Representatives from the 95th district since 2017.

== Early life and career ==
Hill-Evans was born and raised in York, Pennsylvania, and graduated from William Penn High School. She earned her Bachelor of Science in business from Penn State York in 2001. She was a member of the York City Council from 2008 to 2016, during which time she served terms as city council vice president and city council president.

== Pennsylvania House of Representatives ==
Hill-Evans was first elected to the Pennsylvania House of Representatives in 2016, defeating Republican opponent Joel Sears in the general election. She ran unopposed in the 2018 general election, and fended off Republican challenger Kacey French in 2020. She was again re-elected unopposed in 2022, and defeated Republican challenger Jasmine Rivera in 2024. She is running against Rivera again in 2026.

During her tenure in the state legislature, she has served on the house Committee on Ethics, the Education Committee, the Tourism & Recreational Development Committee, the Local Government Committee, and the Veterans Affairs & Emergency Preparedness Committee.
