= Jay R. Wells =

American politician

Jay R. Wells III

Member of the Pennsylvania House of Representatives from the 40th district
- In office January 3, 1971 – November 30, 1974
- Preceded by: Donald Bair
- Succeeded by: Mike Fisher

Personal details
- Born: Jay Ralph Wells III; June 5, 1940 (age 86) Pittsburgh, Pennsylvania
- Party: Republican
- Spouse: Leona Wells
- Occupation: Dentist

Jay Ralph Wells III (born June 5, 1940) is a former Republican member of the Pennsylvania House of Representatives. he was elected as Judge of Elections of Allegheny County.
