= Stanford Lehr =

American politician

Stanford I. Lehr

Member of the Pennsylvania House of Representatives from the 95th district
- In office 1969–1984
- Preceded by: District created
- Succeeded by: Michael E. Bortner

Personal details
- Born: May 13, 1912 York, Pennsylvania
- Died: October 30, 1992 (aged 80) York, Pennsylvania
- Party: Republican

Stanford I. Lehr (May 13, 1912 – October 30, 1992) was a member of the Pennsylvania House of Representatives from 1969 to 1984.
