= John A. Maher =

American politician

Member of the Pennsylvania House of Representatives from the 40th district
- In office September 7, 1997 – January 1, 2019
- Preceded by: Albert Pettit
- Succeeded by: Natalie Mihalek

Personal details
- Born: November 4, 1958 (age 67) New York City, New York, U.S.
- Party: Republican
- Education: Duke University; Oxford University
- Website: State Representative John Maher

John A. Maher III (born November 4, 1958) is a Republican former member of the Pennsylvania House of Representatives from the 40th District. He was originally elected to the House in a special election on September 9, 1997. He was the Republican nominee for State Auditor General in the 2012 election.

== Professional career ==
Maher has been a certified public accountant since 1983. After working in the Pittsburgh office of Ernst and Young, Maher founded his own CPA auditing firm in 1989. Maher stepped down from the firm in 2004 to focus on his work in the State House.

Maher recently served on the national governing body of the American Institute of Certified Public Accountants as a Member of Council for 2009 through 2010, and has been active since the early 1980s with the Pennsylvania Institute of CPAs, including serving multiple years on each of the PICPA Strategic Advisory Board, Editorial Board of Pennsylvania CPA Journal and Trustee of the Pennsylvania Institute Insurance Trust.

Maher is the lead author of the "Overview of Government Accounting" text and other published works. He has also been a recurring lecturer and keynote speaker at the Cambridge University International Symposium of Economic Crime. His lectures have included "Forensic Auditing" and "Accounting for Integrity" to audiences including business and law enforcement leaders from more than sixty nations, including the heads of Interpol and Europol, attorneys general and ambassadors of many countries. Maher served for five years on the National Advisory Board for the Center for Government Accounting Research and Education.

== State House career ==
Maher was first elected in 1997 to fill a mid-term vacancy in the House arising from the death of Representative Al Pettit. He was successful in winning a full term in 1998 and has been re-elected to additional two-year terms in each even year since. He currently serves as Chairman of the Environmental Resources and Energy and is a member of the Standing Committee on Professional Licensure.

Maher authored changes to Pennsylvania's "Open Records Law" (also known as the "Right-to-Know Law"), and was subsequently awarded the Pennsylvania Newspaper Association's "Northrop Award for Open Government. He sponsored the law that provides for web based access to reports by lobbyists and those who hire them.

Maher authored the Audit Integrity Act, which criminalized material deceptions committed in connection with a CPA's attestation report intended for public use. The law makes it a crime for anyone, such as a company executive or director, to provide false or misleading information to deceive the public.

He also wrote Pennsylvania's Prudent Investor Standards, enacted in summer 2008, that elevated safety and soundness as prime objectives for state treasury investments. In addition, Maher authored Local Tax Conformance that applied a uniform measure of individual earned income replacing thousands that had been used across Pennsylvania's 3,000 plus local taxing jurisdictions and nearly 600 tax collectors. This uniform standard enabled streamlining of local tax collectors, which were reduced to fewer than six dozen on January 1, 2012.

On June 13, 2017, Maher was pulled over just outside of Harrisburg by police and charged with driving the wrong way, making an illegal u-turn, and a DUI. He would not run for re-election in 2018.

== Awards ==
The Pennsylvania Newspaper Association awarded Maher the "Bill Northrop Award for distinguished work supporting freedom of information." Maher received the "Seven Seals Award", for Meritorious Leadership and Initiative in Support of the Men and Women who Serve America in the National Guard and Reserve from the Deputy Secretary of Defense in 2003. Common Cause of Pennsylvania awarded Maher its "Champion of Good Government" award for 2009. Maher is the only Pennsylvania state official honored with this award during this century. The Pennsylvania Veterinary Medical Association together with the University of Pennsylvania School of Veterinary Medicine presented him with its highest honor, The Distinguished Service Award, in 2011, for his work to combat animal cruelty and advance animal health and veterinary medicine in the Commonwealth. The Humane Society of the United States recognized Maher as "Humane Legislator of the Year" for 2012. Maher was named to the "Legion of Honor" by Firearm Owners Against Crime (FOAC).

== 2012 campaign for Auditor General ==
Maher announced his candidacy for State Auditor General in early 2012. In May 2012, he defeated businessman Frank Pinto to win the Republican nomination. He faced Democratic State Representative Eugene DePasquale in the fall general election.

In the first official endorsement of the 2012 Pennsylvania state election cycle, the Pittsburgh Post-Gazette endorsed Maher for Auditor General, citing his status as a CPA and Maher's firm's specialization in auditing government agencies and nonprofits. Maher lost the general election to DePasquale by a margin of 160,000 votes.

== Education ==
Maher graduated from Duke University magna cum laude with a degree in Management Sciences and Accounting. He also completed scholarship studies at both Oxford University and the Australian Graduate School of Management.

Pennsylvania House of Representatives
Preceded by Albert Pettit	Member of the Pennsylvania House of Representatives for the 40th District; 1997–2019	Succeeded by Natalie Mihalek
Party political offices
Preceded by Chet Beiler	Republican nominee for Auditor General of Pennsylvania; 2012	Succeeded by John Brown
