= Pennsylvania House of Representatives, District 95 =

American legislative district

Pennsylvania's 95th State House of Representatives district
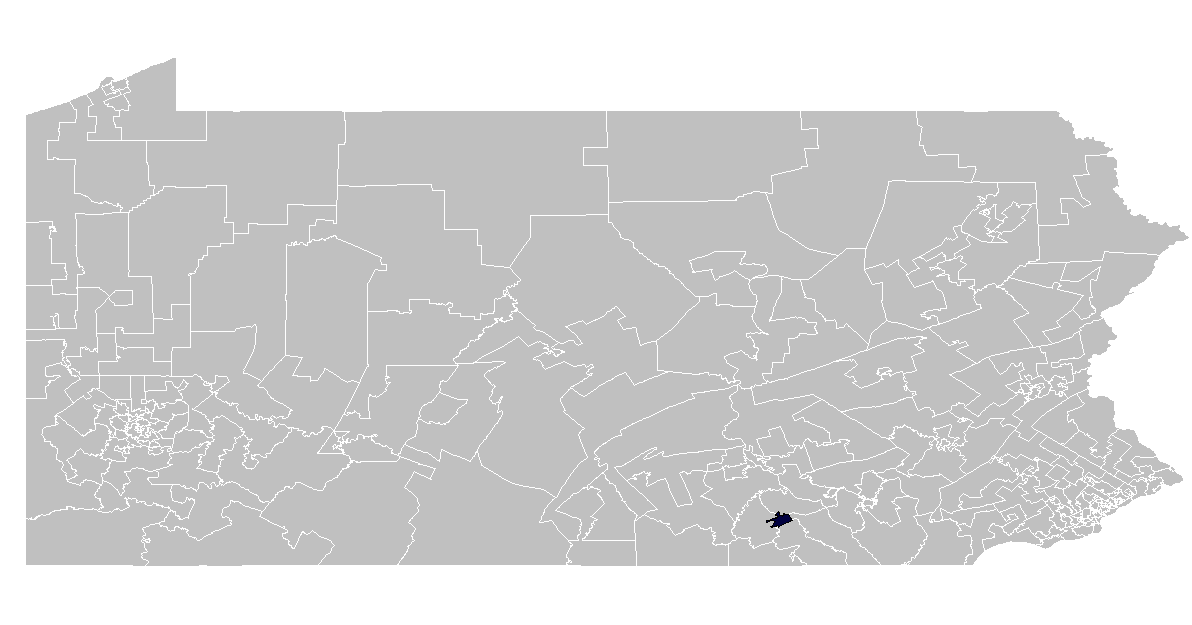
Representative
Carol Hill-Evans; D–York
- Population (2022): 66,193

The 95th Pennsylvania House of Representatives District is located in South Central Pennsylvania and has been represented by Carol Hill-Evans since 2017.

== District profile ==
The 95th District is located in York County and includes the following areas:

- North York Borough
- Spring Garden Township
- West York Borough
- City of York

== Representatives ==
Representative	Party	Years	District home	Note
Prior to 1969, seats were apportioned by county.
Stanford I. Lehr	Republican	1969–1984		
Michael E. Bortner	Democrat	1985–1990		
Stephen H. Stetler	Democrat	1991–2006		
Eugene DePasquale	Democrat	2007–2013	West Manchester Township	
Kevin J. Schreiber	Democrat	2013–2016	York	
Carol Hill-Evans	Democrat	2017–present	York	Incumbent
