= Eugene DePasquale =

American politician (born 1971)

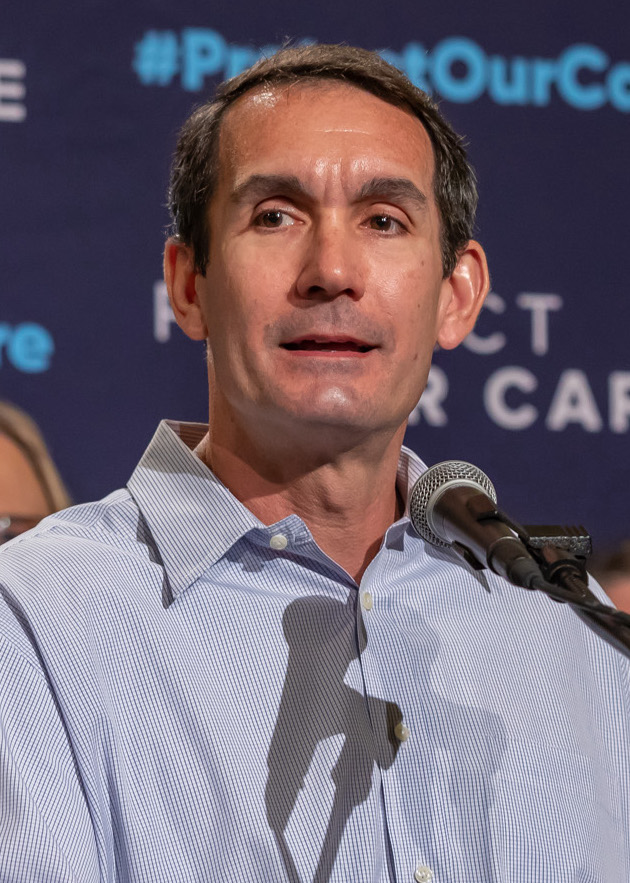

Chair of the Pennsylvania Democratic Party
- Incumbent
- Assumed office September 6, 2025
- Preceded by: Sharif Street

49th Auditor General of Pennsylvania
- In office January 15, 2013 – January 19, 2021
- Governor: Tom Corbett; Tom Wolf
- Preceded by: Jack Wagner
- Succeeded by: Timothy DeFoor

Member of the Pennsylvania House of Representatives from the 95th district
- In office January 2, 2007 – January 15, 2013
- Preceded by: Stephen Stetler
- Succeeded by: Kevin Schreiber

Personal details
- Born: August 3, 1971 (age 55) Pittsburgh, Pennsylvania, U.S.
- Party: Democratic
- Children: 2
- Education: College of Wooster (BA); University of Pittsburgh (MPP); Widener University (JD)
- Website: Campaign website

Eugene A. DePasquale (born August 3, 1971) is an American lawyer and Democratic politician who served as the Pennsylvania Auditor General from 2013 to 2021. From 2007 to 2013, he served in the Pennsylvania House of Representatives, representing the York County-based 95th district. He was the Democratic nominee for Pennsylvania's 10th congressional district in the 2020 election. Since leaving office, DePasquale served as an adjunct professor at Widener University School of Law, and is currently an adjunct law professor at the University of Pittsburgh. He was the Democratic nominee in the 2024 Pennsylvania Attorney General election, losing to Republican Dave Sunday. The following year, DePasquale was elected as the chair of the Pennsylvania Democratic Party.

== Early life and education ==
DePasquale was born on August 3, 1971, in Pittsburgh, Pennsylvania. He graduated from Central Catholic High School and received a bachelor's degree from the College of Wooster. He later earned an MPP from the University of Pittsburgh and a JD from Widener University Commonwealth Law School.

DePasquale was the eldest of three brothers. His youngest brother died while DePasquale was in law school after suffering from muscular dystrophy. At that time, their father, a Vietnam War veteran, was serving ten and a half years in prison on narcotics charges.

DePasquale is the grandson of Eugene "Jeep" DePasquale, who served in the Pittsburgh City Council between 1971 and 1989.

== Early career ==
DePasquale moved to York in 1997. He served as director of economic development for the City of York in the early 2000s.

From 2003 to 2006, DePasquale served as deputy secretary for community revitalization and local government support of the Pennsylvania Department of Environmental Protection.

== Political career ==
=== Pennsylvania House of Representatives ===
When incumbent state representative Steve Stetler resigned from his seat and withdrew from the ballot during the 2006 elections, DePasquale announced his intent to replace him. The York County Democratic Party selected him as their replacement nominee in August, and he defeated Republican nominee Karen Emenheiser 58.3% to 41.7%. His legislative district included all of the city of York, Spring Garden Township, part of West Manchester Township, and the boroughs of North York and West York.

DePasquale was re-elected in 2008, defeating Republican candidate Lon Emenheiser 75.1% to 24.9%. In 2010, DePasquale was unopposed both in his primary and general re-election bids.

=== Pennsylvania Auditor General ===
==== Elections ====
===== 2012 =====
In April 2011, DePasquale announced that he would be running for State Auditor General in 2012 to succeed incumbent Jack Wagner, who was term-limited. DePasquale made Marcellus shale drilling a central issue of his campaign, and promised to order an immediate performance audit of the Department of Environmental Protection to ensure the state's water supply had not been compromised by drilling. He defeated Republican state representative John Maher in the fall general election. Both Maher and DePasquale were concurrently re-elected without opposition to their seats in the state house.

DePasquale resigned his seat in the state house on January 15, 2013, and was sworn-in as auditor general later that day. He became the first person from York County to assume statewide elected office since George Leader was elected governor in 1954.

===== 2016 =====
In the 2016 election, DePasquale was reelected auditor general with 50% of the vote, defeating Republican John Brown.

==== Tenure ====
In July 2014, DePasquale announced results of an audit of the Department of Environmental Protection's (DEP) water programs related to the development of the state's shale gas reserves. Results of that audit showed the DEP had been unprepared to effectively administer laws and regulations to protect drinking water and unable to efficiently respond to citizen complaints in the period 2009-2012. The report cited sloppy record-keeping, lax oversight, and poor communication with citizens.

In May 2016, an interim report by the Auditor General showed that in 2015 nearly 42,000 calls to Childline, Pennsylvania's hotline for reports of child abuse, went unanswered, up from 6,780 in 2014. Furthermore, only 0.005% of calls were overseen by a supervisor. This report prompted changes within the state's Department of Human Services which led to the tracking of all calls to the hotline, a minimum requirement for monitoring calls, and an increase in staffing.

A September 2016 report from the Auditor General's office revealed that over 3,000 rape kits were backlogged by local law enforcement agencies, awaiting testing, with 60% of them waiting untested for over a year. A follow-up in May 2020 announced that the untested backlog had been reduced by 97%, due to increased financial support from the state budget, outside groups and federal programs.

In the wake of the Pittsburgh synagogue shooting, the Auditor General's office released a report in November 2018 on the subject of gun safety in Pennsylvania and access to guns by those requiring mental health care, calling for greater monitoring by gun sellers of buyers in emotional distress. DePasquale's office likewise audited the Pennsylvania background-check system for possible gaps and errors in its screenings for ineligible purchasers.

Along with Pennsylvania Governor Tom Wolf, DePasquale co-chaired a School Safety Task Force that gathered feedback about safety concerns, drills and security measures to prevent or mitigate school shootings.

In February 2019, DePasquale announced that officials in 18 Pennsylvania counties had disclosed that they had accepted improper (but not illegal) gifts from voting-machine vendors, and that several additional officials had failed to disclose such gifts. This followed an investigation about the security of voter registration data, prompted by election-security concerns originating in the 2016 election.

=== 2020 congressional campaign ===
Term-limited from running again as Auditor General, DePasquale announced in June 2019 his candidacy for the United States House of Representatives to represent Pennsylvania's 10th congressional district. He won the Democratic nomination on June 3, 2020. DePasquale was defeated in the general election, with incumbent Scott Perry being declared the victor on November 5. DePasquale subsequently conceded the race.

=== 2024 Attorney General campaign ===
On June 1, 2023, DePasquale announced his candidacy for Pennsylvania Attorney General in the 2024 election. He cited his tenure as Auditor General as a reason to support him, and pledged to be a "pro-choice attorney general." At the Democratic State Committee meeting in December 2023, DePasquale received 52% of the endorsement vote in a five-candidate field, but failed to meet the two-thirds requirement for an official party endorsement. He won the Democratic primary election with 39% of the vote and faced Republican candidate Dave Sunday in the general election. During the general election debate against Sunday, DePasquale pledged not to enforce a hypothetical abortion ban in Pennsylvania. DePasquale lost to Sunday.

=== Pennsylvania Democratic Party chair ===
In 2025, the chairman of the Pennsylvania Democratic Party, Sharif Street announced he was resigning to run for Congress. DePasquale subsequently announced his bid to replace Street with the outgoing chair's support. He was elected chair on September 6.

== Personal life ==
DePasquale lives in West Manchester, Pennsylvania. He has two children and is Lutheran.

== Electoral history ==
Pennsylvania House of Representatives, District 95, 2006 general election
Party	Candidate	Votes	%
Democratic	Eugene DePasquale	7,561	58.28
Republican	Karen Emenheiser	5,412	41.72
Total votes		12,973	100.00
Democratic hold			

Pennsylvania House of Representatives, District 95, 2008 general election
Party	Candidate	Votes	%
Democratic	Eugene DePasquale (incumbent)	17,887	75.07
Republican	Lon Emenheiser	5,941	24.93
Total votes		23,828	100.00
Democratic hold			

Pennsylvania House of Representatives, District 95, 2010 general election
Party	Candidate	Votes	%
Democratic	Eugene DePasquale (incumbent)	Unopposed	
Total votes		9,832	100.00
Democratic hold			

Pennsylvania House of Representatives, District 95, 2012 general election
Party	Candidate	Votes	%
Democratic	Eugene DePasquale (incumbent)	16,804	83.04
Independent	Dave Moser	3,431	16.96
Total votes		20,235	100.00
Democratic hold			

2012 Pennsylvania Auditor General election
Party	Candidate	Votes	%
Democratic	Eugene DePasquale	2,729,565	49.73
Republican	John Maher	2,548,767	46.43
Libertarian	Betsy Elizabeth Summers	210,876	3.84
Total votes		5,489,208	100.00
Margin of victory		180,798	3.30
Democratic hold			

2016 Pennsylvania Auditor General election
Party	Candidate	Votes	%	±%
Democratic	Eugene DePasquale (incumbent)	2,958,818	50.01%	+0.28%
Republican	John Brown	2,667,318	45.08%	−1.35%
Green	John Sweeney	158,942	2.69%	N/A
Libertarian	Roy Minet	131,853	2.23%	−1.61%
Total votes		5,916,931	100.0%	N/A
Democratic hold				

Pennsylvania's 10th Congressional District Primary Results, 2020
Party	Candidate	Votes	%
Democratic	Eugene DePasquale	29,036	58.6
Democratic	Tom Brier	20,552	41.4
Total votes		49,588	100.0

Pennsylvania's 10th Congressional District General Election, 2020
Party	Candidate	Votes	%
Republican	Scott Perry (incumbent)	208,896	53.3
Democratic	Eugene DePasquale	182,938	46.7
Total votes		391,834	100.0
Republican hold			

Pennsylvania Attorney General election, 2024
Party	Candidate	Votes	%	±%
Republican	Dave Sunday	3,496,336	50.81%	+4.51%
Democratic	Eugene DePasquale	3,178,571	46.19%	−4.71%
Libertarian	Robert Cowburn	88,807	1.29%	−0.48%
Green	Richard L Weiss	68,016	0.99%	−0.05%
Constitution	Justin L Magill	31,272	0.45%	0
Forward	Eric L Settle	18,144	0.26%	0
Total votes		6,881,146	100.0%	
Republican hold				

Party political offices
Preceded by Jack Wagner	Democratic nominee for Auditor General of Pennsylvania; 2012, 2016	Succeeded by Nina Ahmad
Preceded by Josh Shapiro	Democratic nominee for Attorney General of Pennsylvania; 2024	Most recent
Preceded by Sharif Street	Chair of the Pennsylvania Democratic Party; 2025–present	Incumbent
Political offices
Preceded by Jack Wagner	Auditor General of Pennsylvania; 2013–2021	Succeeded by Timothy DeFoor
