= Donald Bair =

American politician

Donald O. Bair

Member of the Pennsylvania House of Representatives from the 40th district
- In office January 7, 1969 – November 30, 1970
- Preceded by: District Created
- Succeeded by: Jay Wells

Member of the Pennsylvania House of Representatives from the Allegheny County district
- In office January 5, 1965 – November 30, 1968

Personal details
- Born: March 9, 1903 Pittsburgh, Pennsylvania, United States
- Died: October 27, 1973 (aged 70) Pittsburgh, Pennsylvania, United States
- Party: Republican

Donald O. Bair (March 9, 1903 – October 27, 1973) was a Republican member of the Pennsylvania House of Representatives.
