= James Felts =

American newspaper editor and politician

James Hugh Felts (February 1, 1866–January 12, 1932) was an American newspaper editor and politician.

Felts was born in Williamson County, Illinois. He went to the Williamson County schools and then lived in Marion, Illinois with his wife. Felts was the editor and publishers of the Marion Evening Post' and the Illinois Baptist newspapers. He was also involved in the banking business. Felts served as a Marion City Commissioner for the finance department and on the Marion Board of Education. Felts was a Democrat. He served in the Illinois House of Representatives from 1915 to 1919 and in the Illinois Senate from 1929 until his death in 1932. Felts died at his home in Marion, Illinois after suffering from a long illness.
