= Natalie Mihalek =

American politician

Natalie Nicole Mihalek

Member, Pennsylvania House of Representatives, District 40
- Incumbent
- Assumed office December 1, 2018
- Preceded by: John A. Maher

Personal details
- Born: Allegheny County, Pennsylvania, U.S.
- Party: Republican
- Spouse: Jeremy
- Children: 3
- Education: University of Pittsburgh (BA); Appalachian School of Law (JD)
- Occupation: Lawyer

Military service
- Branch/service: United States Navy
- Years of service: 1997-2000

Natalie Nichole Mihalek is an American politician. She is a Republican representing District 40 in the Pennsylvania House of Representatives.

== Early life ==
Mihalek served in the United States Navy from 1997 to 2000. Afterwards, she earned a Bachelor's degree from the University of Pittsburgh in 2004 and a JD from the Appalachian School of Law in 2007. She worked as an Assistant District Attorney in Allegheny County from 2007 to 2010.

== Political career ==
In 2018, Mihalek ran for election to represent District 40 in the Pennsylvania House of Representatives, which includes Bethel Park, McMurray, and Upper Saint Clair. The incumbent, John A. Maher, decided not to seek reelection. She won a three-way Republican primary with 46.7% of the vote, and went on to win the general election with 56.1% of the vote. She was re-elected in 2020.

In November 2020, a man was arrested for stalking Mihalek and accused of soaping her district office's windows, apparently because Mihalek was unwilling to attempt to overturn Pennsylvania's 2020 presidential election results.

=== Committee assignments ===
- Appropriations, Subcommittee on Education - Chair
- Judiciary
- Liquor Control
- Veterans Affairs & Emergency Preparedness

=== Electoral record ===
2018 Republican primary: Pennsylvania House of Representatives, District 40
| Party | Candidate | Votes | % |
|---|---|---|---|
| Republican | Natalie Mihalek | 2,748 | 46.7% |
| Republican | James Roman | 1,649 | 28.0% |
| Republican | Paul Dixon | 1,491 | 25.3% |

2018 general election: Pennsylvania House of Representatives, District 40
| Party | Candidate | Votes | % |
|---|---|---|---|
| Republican | Natalie Mihalek | 18,730 | 56.1% |
| Democratic | Sharon Guidi | 14,674 | 43.9% |

2020 general election: Pennsylvania House of Representatives, District 40
| Party | Candidate | Votes | % |
|---|---|---|---|
| Republican | Natalie Mihalek | 24,771 | 62.2% |
| Democratic | Sharon Guidi | 15,075 | 37.8% |
