= Alice Langtry =

American politician

Alice S. Langtry

Member of the Pennsylvania House of Representatives from the 40th district
- In office January 5, 1985 – November 30, 1992
- Preceded by: Frank Marmion
- Succeeded by: Albert Pettit

Personal details
- Born: June 29, 1932 Springfield, Massachusetts, United States
- Died: May 1, 2017 (aged 84) Barrington, Illinois, United States
- Party: Republican

Alice S. Langtry (June 29, 1932 – May 1, 2017) was a former Republican member of the Pennsylvania House of Representatives. Langtry died in Barrington, Illinois on May 1, 2017, aged 84.

== Formative years ==
Born in Springfield, Massachusetts on June 29, 1932, Langtry subsequently moved to Boston before relocating to Chicago, Illinois, where she met her future husband, Alfred L. Langtry Jr., in 1959. Following their marriage, they returned to the East Coast, making their home in Erie, Pennsylvania, where he was employed. They then moved to Pittsburgh, where she became involved in public service and charitable work.

== Public service career ==
Appointed to a local traffic safety board and high school advisory committee in her community, Langtry was elected to a position as an Upper St. Clair Township commissioner before pursuing a seat in the Pennsylvania House of Representatives. Elected to fill the vacancy of Frank Marmion in 1984, she advocated for restrictions on strikes by public school teachers and improvements to Pennsylvania's state-controlled liquor store system during her eight-year tenure. A member of the House from 1985 to 1992, she chaired that body's Budget and Finance Committee. She was also an advocate of term limits of elected officials.

== Later years ==
In 2012, Langtry and her husband retired from their respective careers and relocated to Barrington, Illinois to be closer to their children and grandchildren. They also spent time traveling, including to Rome and Florence, Italy.

== Death ==
Langtry died at the age of eighty-four in Barrington, Illinois on May 1, 2017.
