= Kevin J. Schreiber =

American politician

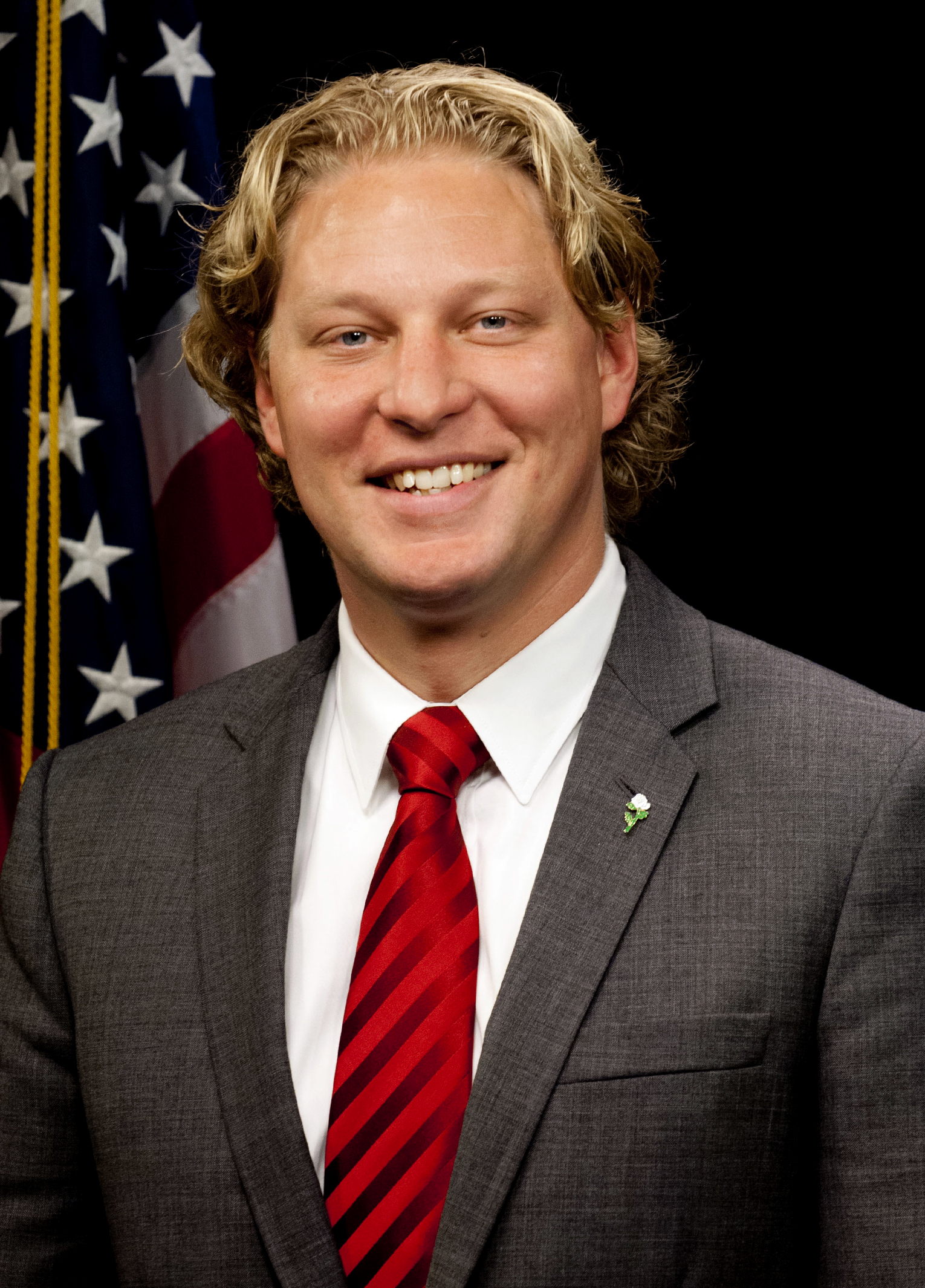

Member of the Pennsylvania House of Representatives from the 95th district
- In office June 4, 2013 – November 30, 2016
- Preceded by: Eugene DePasquale
- Succeeded by: Carol Hill-Evans

Personal details
- Born: March 9, 1980 (age 46) Philadelphia, Pennsylvania
- Party: Democratic
- Spouse: Jen
- Education: York College of Pennsylvania; Penn State
- Website: Kevin for York

Kevin Schreiber (born March 8, 1980) was a member of the Pennsylvania House of Representatives, representing the 95th district from 2013 to 2016.

== Personal life and education ==
Schreiber graduated from St. Pius X High School in 1998 and earned a B.A. in Public Relations from York College of Pennsylvania in 2002. He earned an MPA from Penn State in 2012.

== Career ==
Schreiber served in the House from 2013, when he won a special election to succeed Eugene DePasquale, who resigned his seat to become Pennsylvania Auditor General. He sits on the Appropriations, Education, Environmental Resources & Energy, Local Government, and Tourism & Recreational Development committees. Schreiber described education and keeping small communities competitive as his top priorities.

Schreiber made animal rights one of his major focuses since taking office. He introduced legislation to require pet stores to provide more information to customers about dogs that are available for sale and legislation designed to stop the practice of leaving pets unattended in hot motor vehicles. In April 2016, he was honored with the Humane Pennsylvania Legislator of the Year award for his efforts.

In 2016, Schreiber decided not to seek re-election and it was announced he would be the president and CEO of the York County Economic Alliance effective December 1, 2016.

Schreiber previously served as the director of economic and community development for the York municipal government under both mayoral administrations of John S. Brenner and C. Kim Bracey.
