= Pat Koch Thaler =

American educator and author (1932–2024)

- Thaler in 2024
- Born: Pauline Koch; April 11, 1932; Newark, New Jersey, U.S.
- Died: November 16, 2024 (aged 92); Pompton Plains, New Jersey, U.S.
- Education: Brooklyn College; Bank Street College; Sarah Lawrence College
- Political party: Democratic
- Spouse: Alvin Thaler (m. 1956; died 2008)
- Children: 3
- Relatives: Ed Koch (brother)

Pauline Koch Thaler (née Koch; April 11, 1932 – November 16, 2024) was an American educator, author, and activist. She held leadership roles in continuing education at Marymount Manhattan College and New York University and co-authored a book addressing the dynamics of working couples.

== Early life and education ==
Pauline Koch was born on April 11, 1932, in Newark, New Jersey. Her father, Louis Koch, was a Jewish immigrant from Austria-Hungary who worked as a furrier, and her mother, Joyce Silpe, managed their household. She had two older brothers: Harold, a rug designer, and Ed, who later became the mayor of New York City.

Her family moved to Brooklyn, where she attended Erasmus Hall High School. During her teenage years, she changed her name from Pauline to Pat. She earned a B.A. in English from Brooklyn College in 1953. She completed a master's degree in school guidance at Bank Street College and Sarah Lawrence College in 1972.

== Career ==
Thaler began her career as a junior high school guidance counselor. By 1978, she was the director of continuing education at Marymount Manhattan College, focusing on facilitating educational opportunities for adult learners. Later, she served as the dean of arts, sciences, and humanities at the New York University School of Continuing Education.

In 1980, she co-authored the book Working Couples with Hilary Ryglewicz, which was based on interviews with nearly 200 couples and addressed the challenges of balancing professional and domestic lives.

Thaler actively participated in political and social causes. She opposed the Vietnam War and, in 1968, she and her husband opened their home to a 12-year-old South Vietnamese boy who was injured in a rocket explosion during the war and receiving treatment in New York. She also supported abortion rights and progressive Democratic politics. During her brother Ed Koch's political campaigns, Thaler supported his efforts, including wearing a "Sister of Koch" button. However, she expressed a desire to be recognized for her accomplishments separate from her relationship with her brother.

In 2004, Thaler and her brother Ed Koch wrote a children's book, Eddie, Harold's Little Brother; it tells the story of Koch's childhood, when he tried unsuccessfully to emulate his older brother Harold's baseball talents, before realizing that he should instead focus on what he was already good at, which was telling stories and speaking in public.

== Personal life ==
She married Alvin Thaler, a producer and director at CBS News, in 1956. They had three sons together; Samuel, Jon, and Jared. She was widowed in 2008.

=== Illness and death ===
Thaler battled cancer for over 22 years, enduring multiple treatments including radiation, chemotherapy, and surgery, with periods of remission before the disease ultimately became inoperable. In her later years, she resided in a retirement community in Pompton Plains, New Jersey, and entered hospice care seven months before her death.

Thaler died on November 16, 2024, at the age of 92, choosing to utilize New Jersey's Medical Aid in Dying law to avoid prolonged suffering.
