= 2016 Pennsylvania Auditor General election =

- November 8, 2016
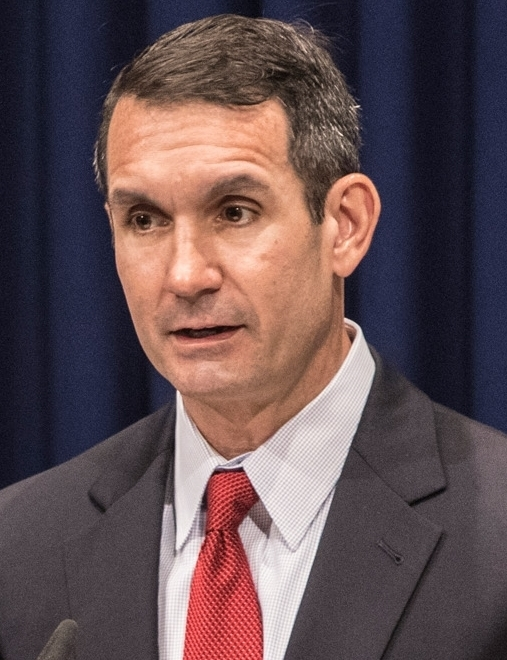

Nominee	Eugene DePasquale	John Brown
Party	Democratic	Republican
Popular vote	2,958,818	2,667,318
Percentage	50.01%	45.08%
- DePasquale: 40–50% 50–60% 60–70% 70–80% 80–90% >90% Brown: 40–50% 50–60% 60–70% 70–80% 80–90% >90% Tie: 40–50% 50% No votes
Auditor General before election
Eugene DePasquale
Democratic
Elected Auditor General
Eugene DePasquale
Democratic

The Pennsylvania Auditor General election of 2016 was held on November 8, 2016. The primary election was held on April 26, 2016.

== Democratic primary ==
=== Candidates ===
- Eugene DePasquale, incumbent auditor

=== Results ===
Democratic primary results
Party	Candidate	Votes	%
Democratic	Eugene DePasquale (incumbent)	Unopposed	
Total votes		1,307,226	100.0%

== Republican primary ==
=== Candidates ===
- John Brown, Northampton County executive and former mayor of Bangor

=== Results ===
Republican primary results
Party	Candidate	Votes	%
Republican	John A. Brown	Unopposed	
Total votes		1,203,209	100.0%

== General election ==
=== Results ===
2016 Pennsylvania Auditor General election
Party	Candidate	Votes	%	±%
Democratic	Eugene DePasquale (incumbent)	2,958,818	50.01%	+0.28%
Republican	John Brown	2,667,318	45.08%	−1.35%
Green	John Sweeney	158,942	2.69%	N/A
Libertarian	Roy Minet	131,853	2.23%	−1.61%
Total votes		5,916,931	100.0%	N/A
Democratic hold				
