= 2020 United States presidential election in Michigan =

- November 3, 2020
- Turnout: 71%▲

Nominee	Joe Biden	Donald Trump
Party	Democratic	Republican
Home state	Delaware	Florida
Running mate	Kamala Harris	Mike Pence
Electoral vote	16	0
Popular vote	2,804,040	2,649,852
Percentage	50.62%	47.84%

Biden
40–50%
50–60%
60–70%
70–80%
80–90%
90–100%
Trump
40–50%
50–60%
60–70%
70–80%
80–90%
90–100%
Tie
President before election
Donald Trump
Republican
Elected President
Joe Biden
Democratic

The 2020 United States presidential election in Michigan was held on Tuesday, November 3, 2020, as part of the 2020 United States presidential election in which all 50 states plus the District of Columbia participated. Michigan voters chose electors to represent them in the Electoral College via a popular vote, pitting the Republican Party's nominee, incumbent President Donald Trump of Florida, and his running mate, Vice President Mike Pence of Indiana against the Democratic Party nominee, former Vice President Joe Biden of Delaware, and his running mate, Senator Kamala Harris of California. Michigan had 16 electoral votes in the Electoral College.

In 2016, Trump became the first Republican to carry Michigan since 1988, when George H. W. Bush had scored a decisive nationwide win against Michael Dukakis. Throughout the campaign, Biden touted his work on the auto bailout in manufacturing towns outside Detroit. Appearing with United Auto Workers, Biden presented a new proposal to penalize American companies for moving manufacturing and service jobs overseas and then selling their products back in the United States. Polls of Michigan throughout the campaign generally indicated a clear Biden lead. Prior to election day, most news organizations considered Michigan a likely blue state, or a state that Biden was likely to win.

Biden ultimately carried Michigan by 2.78%, a far closer margin than expected. Per exit polls by the Associated Press, Biden's strength in Michigan came from union households, who composed 21% of the electorate and supported Biden by 56%–42%. Biden was also able to boost minority turnout, consequently winning 93% of Black American voters. Many voters were also concerned with the COVID-19 pandemic, which had hit the state hard; 52% of voters felt the pandemic was not under control at all, and these voters broke for Biden by 82%–16%. Trump outperformed his polling average in the state, but not by enough to win. Michigan marked Biden's strongest performance in a state won by Trump in 2016, even voting to the left of Nevada which Trump lost in 2016.

Biden flipped the counties of Leelanau, Kent, and Saginaw, becoming the first Democrat since Woodrow Wilson in 1916 to win the presidency without winning Bay or Gogebic Counties, the first Democrat since Harry S. Truman in 1948 to win without Monroe County, the first Democrat since John F. Kennedy in 1960 to win without Lake County and the first Democrat since Jimmy Carter in 1976 to win without Calhoun, Isabella, Manistee, Shiawassee, or Van Buren Counties.

With Ohio, Florida, and Iowa backing the losing candidate for the first time since 1960, 1992, and 2000 respectively, this election established Michigan, Wisconsin, and Pennsylvania as the states with the longest bellwether streak still in effect today. The last time any of them voted against the winning candidate was 2004, when all three voted for losing Democrat John Kerry.

Michigan's overall vote in for this election was 1.67% more Republican than the nation at-large but also the closest to the national results.

== Primary elections ==
The primary elections were held on March 10, 2020.

=== Republican primary ===
Incumbent United States President Donald Trump was challenged by three candidates: former governor Mark Sanford of South Carolina, former congressman Joe Walsh of Illinois, and former governor Bill Weld of Massachusetts. Sanford and Walsh both withdrew prior to the primary. Michigan is the only primary state where Sanford's name remained on the ballot.

2020 Michigan Republican primary
Candidate	Votes	%	Estimated delegates
Donald Trump (incumbent)	640,552	93.7%	73
Uncommitted	32,743	4.8%	0
Bill Weld	6,099	0.9%	0
Mark Sanford (withdrawn)	4,258	0.6%	0
Joe Walsh (withdrawn)	4,067	0.6%	0
Total	683,431	100%	73

=== Democratic primary ===
Bernie Sanders and former Vice President Joe Biden were the two major declared Democratic candidates.

Results by county Biden—40–50% Biden—50–60% Biden—60–70%

2020 Michigan Democratic presidential primary
Candidate	Votes	%	Delegates
Joe Biden	840,360	52.93	73
Bernie Sanders	576,926	36.34	52
Michael Bloomberg (withdrawn) (Note: Candidate withdrew during absentee voting, following Super Tuesday.)	73,464	4.63	
Elizabeth Warren (withdrawn)	26,148	1.65	
Pete Buttigieg (withdrawn) (Note: Candidate withdrew during absentee voting, before Super Tuesday.)	22,462	1.41	
Amy Klobuchar (withdrawn)	11,018	0.69	
Tulsi Gabbard	9,461	0.60	
Andrew Yang (withdrawn) (Note: Candidate withdrew during absentee voting, following the New Hampshire primary.)	2,380	0.15	
Tom Steyer (withdrawn)	1,732	0.11	
Michael Bennet (withdrawn)	1,536	0.10	
Cory Booker (withdrawn)	840	0.05	
Joe Sestak (withdrawn)	757	0.05	
Marianne Williamson (withdrawn)	719	0.05	
John Delaney (withdrawn) (Note: Candidate withdrew in January, shortly after absentee voting had begun.)	464	0.03	
Julian Castro (withdrawn)	306	0.02	
Uncommitted	19,106	1.20	
Total	1,587,679	100%	125

== General election ==
=== Final predictions ===
Source	Ranking
The Cook Political Report	Lean D (flip)
Inside Elections	Lean D (flip)
Sabato's Crystal Ball	Lean D (flip)
Politico	Lean D (flip)
RCP	Tossup
Niskanen	Likely D (flip)
CNN	Lean D (flip)
The Economist	Likely D (flip)
CBS News	Lean D (flip)
270towin	Lean D (flip)
ABC News	Lean D (flip)
NPR	Lean D (flip)
NBC News	Lean D (flip)
538	Solid D (flip)

=== Polling ===
View source data.

==== Aggregate polls ====
Source of poll aggregation	Dates administered	Dates updated	Joe Biden Democratic	Donald Trump Republican	Other/ Undecided (Note: Calculated by taking the difference of 100% and all other candidates combined.)	Margin
270 to Win	October 22 – November 2, 2020	November 3, 2020	49.9%	44.4%	5.7%	Biden +5.5
Real Clear Politics	October 29 – November 1, 2020	November 3, 2020	50.0%	45.8%	4.2%	Biden +4.2
FiveThirtyEight	until November 1, 2020	November 3, 2020	51.2%	43.2%	5.6%	Biden +7.9
Average			50.4%	44.5%	5.1%	Biden +5.9

==== 2020 polls ====
Poll source	Date(s) administered	Sample size (Note: Key: A – all adults RV – registered voters LV – likely voters V – unclear)	Margin of error	Donald Trump Republican	Joe Biden Democratic	Jo Jorgensen Libertarian	Howie Hawkins Green	Other	Undecided
SurveyMonkey/Axios	Oct 20 – Nov 2	4,549 (LV)	± 2%	46% (Note: Overlapping sample with the previous SurveyMonkey/Axios poll, but more information available regarding sample size)	52%	-	-	–	–
Research Co.	Oct 31 – Nov 1	450 (LV)	± 4.6%	43%	50%	-	-	2% (Note: "Someone else" with 2%)	5%
Change Research/CNBC	Oct 29 – Nov 1	383 (LV)	± 5.01%	44%	51%	3%	1%	–	1%
Swayable	Oct 27 – Nov 1	413 (LV)	± 6.5%	45%	54%	1%	0%	–	–
Ipsos/Reuters	Oct 27 – Nov 1	654 (LV)	± 4.4%	43% (Note: Standard VI response)	53%	1%	0%	2% (Note: "Some other candidate" with 2%; West (B) and would not vote with 0%)	–
Ipsos/Reuters	Oct 27 – Nov 1	654 (LV)	± 4.4%	42% (Note: If only Biden, Trump and "some other candidate" were available)	52%	-	-	3% (Note: "Some other candidate" with 3%; would not vote with 0%)	3%
Ipsos/Reuters	Oct 27 – Nov 1	654 (LV)	± 4.4%	45% (Note: Results considering those who lean towards a given candidate among those initially predisposed towards abstention, indecision or a candidate besides Biden or Trump in the response section immediately above)	53%	-	-	2% (Note: "Some other candidate" with 2%)	–
Trafalgar Group	Oct 30–31	1,033 (LV)	± 2.97%	48%	46%	2%	-	1%	3%
AtlasIntel	Oct 30–31	686 (LV)	± 4%	46%	48%	-	-	6%	–
Insider Advantage/Center for American Greatness (Note: The Center for American Greatness is a pro-Trump organization)	Oct 30–31	500 (LV)	± 4.4%	47%	49%	2%	-	–	3%
Morning Consult	Oct 22–31	1,736 (LV)	± 2.0%	44.5%	52%	-	-	–	–
Emerson College	Oct 29–30	700 (LV)	± 3.4%	45% (Note: With voters who lean towards a given candidate)	52%	-	-	3% (Note: "Someone else" with 3%)	–
Public Policy Polling/Progress Michigan (Note: Progress Michigan is a non-profit that primarily supports Democratic candidates)	Oct 29–30	745 (V)	± 3.6%	44%	54%	1%	0%	–	1%
Targoz Market Research/PollSmart	Oct 25–30	993 (LV)	–	39%	53%	-	-	8% (Note: "Not sure/Someone else/Undecided" with 8%)	–
CNN/SSRS	Oct 23–30	907 (LV)	± 3.8%	41%	53%	2%	1%	1% (Note: "None of these" with 1%; "Other" with 0%)	2%
Mitchell Research (R)/MIRS	Oct 29	817 (LV)	± 3.43%	45%	52%	1%	1%	0% (Note: "Someone else" with no voters)	0%
RMG Research/PoliticalIQ	Oct 27–29	800 (LV)	± 3.5%	44%	51%	-	-	3%	2%
RMG Research/PoliticalIQ	Oct 27–29	800 (LV)	± 3.5%	42% (Note: Results generated with high Democratic turnout model)	53%	-	-	3%	2%
RMG Research/PoliticalIQ	Oct 27–29	800 (LV)	± 3.5%	45% (Note: Results generated with high Republican turnout model)	50%	-	-	3%	2%
Redfield & Wilton Strategies	Oct 26–29	1,212 (LV)	–	41%	54%	1%	0%	1%	4%
EPIC-MRA	Oct 25–28	600 (LV)	± 4%	41%	48%	-	-	5% (Note: "Third party" with 5%)	6% (Note: Includes "Refused")
Trafalgar Group	Oct 25–28	1,058 (LV)	± 2.93%	49%	47%	2%	-	1% (Note: "Someone else" with 1%)	1%
Kiaer Research	Oct 21–28	669 (LV)	± 5.6%	41%	54%	-	-	2% (Note: "Other/third party" with 2%)	4%
SurveyMonkey/Axios	Oct 1–28, 2020	7,541 (LV)	–	45%	53%	-	-	–	–
Mitchell Research (R)/MIRS	Oct 25–27	759 (LV)	± 3.56%	42%	52%	3%	0%	0% (Note: "Someone else" with 0%)	2%
Swayable	Oct 23–26, 2020	394 (LV)	± 6.7%	40%	59%	2%	0%	–	–
Siena College/NYT Upshot	Oct 23–26	856 (LV)	± 3.8%	41%	49%	2%	1%	0% (Note: "Someone else" and would not vote with 0%)	6%
Ipsos/Reuters	Oct 20–26	652 (LV)	± 4.4%	43%	53%	1%	0%	2%	–
Ipsos/Reuters	Oct 20–26	652 (LV)	± 4.4%	43%	52%	-	-	3%	3%
Wick Surveys	Oct 24–25	1,000 (LV)	± 3.1%	48%	48%	-	-	–	–
Glengariff Group/Detroit News	Oct 23–25	600 (LV)	± 4%	42%	49%	-	-	2% (Note: "Third party" with 2%)	4%
ABC/Washington Post	Oct 20–25	789 (LV)	± 4%	44%	51%	3%	0%	0% (Note: "Other" and "None of these" with 0%; would not vote with no voters)	1%
Gravis Marketing	Oct 24	679 (LV)	± 3.8%	42%	55%	-	-	–	3%
Public Policy Polling/American Bridge PAC (Note: The American Bridge PAC exclusively supports Democratic candidates)	Oct 21–22	804 (V)	–	43%	50%	-	-	–	6%
YouGov/University of Wisconsin-Madison	Oct 13–21	681 (LV)	± 4.2%	42%	52%	-	-	5% (Note: Includes Undecided)	–
Citizen Data	Oct 17–20	1,000 (LV)	± 3.1%	41%	50%	1%	0%	1%	7%
Fox News	Oct 17–20	1,032 (LV)	± 3.0%	40%	52%	3%	0%	2% (Note: "Other" with 2%; would not vote with no voters)	3%
Ipsos/Reuters	Oct 14–20	686 (LV)	± 4.3%	44%	52%	2%	0%	2%	–
Ipsos/Reuters	Oct 14–20	686 (LV)	± 4.3%	44%	51%	-	-	3%	2%
Morning Consult	Oct 11–20	1,717 (LV)	± 2.4%	44%	52%	-	-	–	–
Change Research/CNBC	Oct 16–19	718 (LV) (Note: Additional data sourced from FiveThirtyEight)	–	44%	51%	-	-	–	–
EPIC-MRA	Oct 15–19	600 (LV)	± 4%	39%	48%	-	-	5% (Note: "Third party candidate" with 5%)	8%
Mitchell Research (R)/MIRS	Oct 18	900 (LV)	± 3.27%	41%	51%	3%	1%	1%	3%
Trafalgar Group/Restoration PAC (Note: The Restoration PAC is a 501 non-profit which supports Donald Trump's 2020 presidential campaign)	Oct 15–18	1,034 (LV)	± 2.97%	47%	45%	3%	2%	2%	2%
Data For Progress	Oct 15–18	830 (LV)	± 3.4%	45%	50%	2%	0%	–	3%
Zia Poll/Painter Communications/MIRS News	Oct 11–18	2,851 (LV)	± 2.5%	49%	45%	-	-	2%	3%
HarrisX/The Hill	Oct 12–15	1,289 (LV)	–	43%	54%	-	-	–	–
Trafalgar Group	Oct 11–14	1,025 (LV)	± 2.97%	47%	46%	3%	2%	2%	2%
Redfield & Wilton Strategies	Oct 10–13	972 (LV)	–	42%	51%	1%	0%	–	–
RMG Research/PoliticalIQ	Oct 8–13	800 (LV)	–	42%	48%	2%	1%	1%	5%
RMG Research/PoliticalIQ	Oct 8–13	800 (LV)	–	39%	51%	2%	1%	1%	5%
RMG Research/PoliticalIQ	Oct 8–13	800 (LV)	–	44%	46%	2%	1%	1%	5%
Ipsos/Reuters	Oct 7–13	620 (LV)	± 4.5%	44%	51%	2%	1%	2% (Note: "Some other candidate" and West (B) with 1%; would not vote with 0%)	–
Ipsos/Reuters	Oct 7–13	620 (LV)	± 4.5%	43%	51%	-	-	3%	2%
EPIC-MRA/Detroit Free Press	Oct 8–12	600 (LV)	± 4%	39%	48%	-	-	4% (Note: "Third party candidate" with 4%)	9%
Civiqs/Rust Belt Rising (Note: Rust Belt Rising is affiliated with the Democratic Party)	Oct 8–11	543 (LV)	± 4.6%	43%	52%	-	-	4% (Note: "Someone else" with 4%)	2%
Siena College/NYT Upshot	Oct 6–11	614 (LV)	± 4.6%	40%	48%	1%	1%	1% (Note: "Someone else" with 1%; would not vote with 0%)	8%
Morning Consult	Oct 2–11	1,710 (LV)	± 2.4%	44%	51%	-	-	–	–
Redfield & Wilton Strategies	Oct 9–10	827 (LV)	–	41%	51%	2%	1%	–	–
YouGov/CBS	Oct 6–9	1,190 (LV)	± 3.3%	46%	52%	-	-	2% (Note: "Other third party" with 2%)	0%
Baldwin Wallace University	Sep 30 – Oct 8	1,134 (LV)	± 3.2%	43%	50%	1%	1%	0% (Note: "Another candidate" with 0%)	4%
Emerson College	Oct 6–7	716 (LV)	± 3.6%	43%	54%	-	-	2%	–
Redfield & Wilton Strategies	Oct 4–6	700 (LV)	± 3.7%	42%	50%	1%	0%	1% (Note: "Another Third Party/Write-in" with 1%)	6%
Opinion Insight/American Action Forum (Note: The American Action Forum is a 501 organization which usually supports Republican candidates)	Oct 3–6	800 (LV)	± 3.46%	44%	52%	-	-	2%	3%
Ipsos/Reuters	Sep 29 – Oct 6	709 (LV)	± 4.2%	43%	51%	-	-	2% (Note: "Some other candidate" with 2%; would not vote with 0%)	3%
Change Research/CNBC	Oct 2–4	676 (LV)	–	43%	51%	-	-	–	–
Glengariff Group/Detroit News	Sep 30 – Oct 3	600 (LV)	± 4%	39%	48%	-	-	5% (Note: "Refused" with 3%; "Third Party" with 2%)	7%
Public Policy Polling/Progress Michigan	Sep 30 – Oct 1	746 (V)	–	44%	50%	2%	1%	–	3%
SurveyMonkey/Axios	Sep 1–30	3,297 (LV)	–	44%	53%	-	-	–	3%
Trafalgar Group/Restoration PAC	Sep 26–28	1,042 (LV)	± 2.95%	47%	49%	2%	0%	1%	2%
Redfield & Wilton Strategies	Sep 23–26	785 (LV)	± 3.5%	42%	51%	1%	0%	0% (Note: "Another Third Party/Write-in" with 0%)	6%
Marist College/NBC	Sep 19–23	799 (LV)	± 4.3%	44%	52%	-	-	1%	3%
ALG Research/Committee to Protect Medicare (Note: The Committee to Protect Medicare is a PAC with a history of buying ads arguing against the reelection of Trump)	Sep 17–23	800 (LV)	± 3.5%	44%	52%	-	-	–	–
Trafalgar Group	Sep 20–22	1,015 (LV)	± 2.99%	46.7%	46.0%	2.1%	0.8%	1.2% (Note: "Someone else" with 1.2%)	3.2%
Baldwin Wallace University	Sep 9–22	1,001 (LV)	± 3.6%	42%	50%	1%	0%	1% (Note: "Another candidate" with 1%)	6%
YouGov/UW-Madison Elections Research; Center/Wisconsin State Journal	Sep 10–21	641 (LV)	–	45%	51%	-	-	–	–
Change Research/CNBC	Sep 18–20	568 (LV)	–	43%	51%	-	-	–	–
Hart Research Associates/Human Rights Campaign (Note: The Human Rights Campaign endorsed Biden prior to this poll's sampling period)	Sep 17–19	400 (LV)	± 4.9%	45%	50%	-	-	–	–
Data for Progress (D)	Sep 14–19	455 (LV)	± 4.6%	42%	48%	1%	0%	–	9%
Data for Progress (D)	Sep 14–19	455 (LV)	± 4.6%	44% (Note: If only Trump and Biden were candidates)	50%	-	-	–	6%
MRG	Sep 14–19	600 (LV)	± 4%	41%	46%	-	-	8% (Note: "Someone else" with 7%; "Refused" with 1%; would not vote with 0%)	5%
Ipsos/Reuters	Sep 11–16	637 (LV)	± 4.4%	44%	49%	-	-	2%	4%
Civiqs/Rust Belt Rising	Sep 11–15	517 (RV)	–	42%	53%	-	-	3%	1%
Redfield & Wilton Strategies	Sep 12–14	930 (LV)	± 3.21%	39%	49%	2%	1%	0%	9%
EPIC-MRA	Sep 10–15	600 (LV)	± 4%	40%	48%	-	-	5%	7%
Benenson Strategy Group/GS Strategy Group/AARP	Aug 28 – Sep 8	1,600 (LV)	± 2.5%	43%	50%	-	-	1% (Note: Would not vote with 1%)	5%
Morning Consult	Aug 29 – Sep 7	1,455 (LV)	± (2%–4%)	42% (Note: Overlapping sample with the previous Morning Consult poll, but more information available regarding sample size)	52%	-	-	–	–
Change Research/CNBC	Sep 4–6	876 (LV)	–	43%	49%	-	-	7% (Note: "Other/not sure" with 7%)	–
Pulse Opinion Research/Rasmussen Reports	Sep 2–3	1,000 (LV)	± 3%	44%	53%	-	-	3% (Note: "Some other candidate" with 3%)	–
Glengariff Group	Sep 1–3	600 (LV)	± 4%	42%	47%	-	-	4% (Note: "Refused" with 3%; "Third party" with 1%)	7%
Redfield & Wilton Strategies	Aug 30 – Sep 3	967 (LV)	± 3.15%	40%	51%	1%	0%	1%	7%
Opinion Insight/American Action Forum	Aug 30 – Sep 2	802 (LV)	± 3.46%	44%	51%	2%	1%	0% (Note: Would not vote with 0%)	3%
SurveyMonkey/Axios	Aug 1–31	2,962 (LV)	–	48%	49%	-	-	–	3%
Morning Consult	Aug 21–30	1,424 (LV)	± (2%–4%)	42%	52%	-	-	–	–
Public Policy Polling/Progress Michigan	Aug 28–29	897 (V)	–	44%	48%	3%	1%	–	3%
Change Research/CNBC	Aug 21–23	809 (LV)	–	44%	50%	-	-	–	–
Trafalgar Group	Aug 14–23	1,048 (LV)	± 2.98%	47%	45%	3%	-	1% (Note: "Another party candidate" with 1%)	4%
Redfield and Wilton Strategies	Aug 16–19	812 (LV)	–	38%	50%	1%	1%	1% (Note: "Another third party/write-in" 1%)	9%
Civiqs/Rust Belt Rising	Aug 13–17	631 (RV)	–	46%	49%	-	-	3%	1%
Morning Consult	Aug 7–16	1,212 (LV)	± (2%–4%)	44%	50%	-	-	–	–
Hodas & Associates/Restoration PAC	Aug 11–15	600 (LV)	–	41%	52%	-	-	–	7%
Change Research/CNBC	Aug 7–9	413 (LV)	–	43%	48%	-	-	–	–
YouGov/University of Wisconsin-Madison	Jul 27 – Aug 6	761 (RV)	± 5.1%	43%	47%	-	-	5% (Note: "Other" with 3%; would not vote with 2%)	6%
GQR Research/Unite the Country PAC (Note: Unite the Country PAC has endorsed Biden's presidential campaign)	Jul 30 – Aug 4	1,245 (LV)	–	43%	52%	-	-	–	–
David Binder Research	Jul 30–31	200 (LV)	–	41%	51%	-	-	–	–
SurveyMonkey/Axios	Jul 1–31	3,083 (LV)	–	48%	49%	-	-	–	2%
EPIC-MRA	Jul 25–30	600 (LV)	± 4.0%	40%	51%	3%	-	-	6%
Public Policy Polling/Progress Michigan	Jul 28–29	876 (V)	–	43%	49%	-	-	6% (Note: "Third party" with 6%)	3%
Change Research/CNBC	Jul 24–26	413 (LV)	–	42%	46%	-	-	–	–
Morning Consult	Jul 17–26	1,320 (LV)	± 2.7%	42%	52%	-	-	–	–
YouGov/CBS	Jul 21–24	1,156 (LV)	± 3.4%	42%	48%	-	-	2% (Note: "Someone else/third party" with 2%; would not vote with 0%)	7%
Redfield & Wilton Strategies	Jul 19–24	811 (LV)	–	37%	49%	1%	1%	2% (Note: "Another Third Party/Write-In" with 2%)	10%
CNN/SSRS	Jul 18–24	927 (RV)	± 3.8%	40%	52%	-	-	5% (Note: "Other" with 1%; "Neither" with 4%)	2%
Gravis Marketing	Jul 22	754 (RV)	± 3.6%	42%	51%	-	-	–	7%
Fox News	Jul 18–20	756 (RV)	± 3.5%	40%	49%	-	-	4% (Note: "Other" with 3%; would not vote with 1%)	7%
Hodas & Associates/Restoration PAC	Jul 13–16	600 (LV)	± 4.0%	41%	53%	-	-	–	7%
Spry Strategies/American Principles Project (Note: This poll's sponsor is the American Principles Project, a 501(c)(4) organization that supports the Republican Party.)	Jul 11–16	600 (LV)	± 3.7%	50%	45%	-	-	–	5%
Change Research/CNBC	Jul 10–12	824 (LV)	–	42%	48%	-	-	–	–
Public Policy Polling/Public Policy Polling/Giffords (D) (Note: Poll sponsored by Giffords, whose head - Gabby Giffords - had endorsed Biden prior to the sampling period)	Jul 9–10	1,041 (V)	± 3.2%	44%	51%	-	-	–	5%
SurveyMonkey/Axios	Jun 8–30	1,238 (LV)	–	46%	51%	-	-	–	3%
Change Research/CNBC	Jun 26–28	699 (LV)	–	43%	48%	-	-	–	–
Public Policy Polling/Public Policy Polling/Progress Michigan (D)	Jun 26–27	1,237 (V)	–	44%	50%	-	-	5% (Note: "Would vote third party" with 5%)	1%
Hodas & Associates/Hodas & Associates/Restoration PAC (R)	Jun 17–20	600 (LV)	± 4.0%	38%	56%	-	-	2% (Note: "Refused" with 2%)	7%
Trafalgar Group	Jun 16–18	1,101 (LV)	± 2.95%	45%	46%	-	-	5%	4%
NYT Upshot/Siena College	Jun 8–17	610 (RV)	± 4.3%	36%	47%	-	-	8% (Note: "Another candidate" with 3%; Would not vote with 5%)	9%
Redfield & Wilton Strategies	Jun 14–16	826 (LV)	± 3.41%	36%	47%	2%	1%	2% (Note: "other" with 2%)	12%
TargetPoint	Jun 11–16	1,000 (A)	–	33%	49%	-	-	4% (Note: "Refused/no answer" with 4%)	14%
Change Research/CNBC	Jun 12–14	353 (LV)	–	45%	47%	-	-	3% (Note: "Libertarian Party candidate/Green Party candidate" with 3%)	–
TIPP/American Greatness PAC	Jun 9–12	859 (LV)	–	38%	51%	-	-	4% (Note: "Other" with 4%; "prefer not to answer" with 0%)	7%
Kiaer Research	May 31 – Jun 7	543 (LV)	± 6.4%	35%	50%	-	-	6% (Note: "A different candidate" with 6%)	8%
EPIC-MRA	May 31 – Jun 4	600 (LV)	± 4%	39%	55%	-	-	–	–
EPIC-MRA	May 30 – Jun 3	600 (LV)	± 4%	41%	53%	-	-	–	6%
Change Research/CNBC	May 29–31	620 (LV)	–	46%	48%	-	-	3%	3%
Public Policy Polling/Progress Michigan	May 29–30	1,582 (V)	± 2.5%	44%	50%	-	-	4% (Note: "Third party" with 4%)	2%
Morning Consult	May 17–26	1,325 (LV)	–	42%	50%	-	-	–	–
Public Policy Polling/Protect Our Care (Note: Protect Our Care is a pro-Affordable Care Act organization)	May 18–19	1,234 (V)	± 2.8%	45%	51%	-	-	–	5%
Change Research/Crooked Media	May 11–17	3,070 (LV)	–	46%	49%	-	-	–	–
Redfield & Wilton Strategies	May 10–14	970 (LV)	± 3.2%	39%	47%	-	-	3% (Note: "Third party/write-in" with 3%)	11%
Hodas & Associates/Hodas & Associates/Restoration PAC (R)	May 1–5	600 (LV)	± 3%	42%	50%	-	-	–	8%
Public Policy Polling (Note: Poll sponsored by Progress Michigan, the Michigan branch of Progress Now, a progressive advocacy organization)	Apr 28–29	1,270 (V)	–	42%	50%	-	-	–	8%
Public Policy Polling (Note: Poll sponsored by Protect Our Care, a pro-Affordable Care Act organization)	Apr 20–21	1,277 (RV)	–	44%	51%	-	-	–	5%
Fox News	Apr 18–21	801 (RV)	± 3.5%	41%	49%	-	-	3%	6%
Ipsos/Reuters	Apr 15–20	612 (RV)	± 5.0%	38%	46%	-	-	–	–
Hodas & Associates/Hodas & Associates/Restoration PAC (R)	Apr 9–11	600 (RV)	± 3.0%	43%	49%	-	-	–	–
Hart Research/CAP Action (Note: CAP Action is a political advocacy group that exclusively supports Democratic candidates)	Apr 6–8	303 (RV)	–	41%	50%	-	-	4%	5%
Public Policy Polling	Mar 31 – Apr 1	1,019 (RV)	± 3.1%	45%	48%	-	-	–	7%
SPRY Strategies	Mar 30 – Apr 1	602 (LV)	± 4.0%	46%	46%	-	-	–	8%
Baldwin Wallace University Great Lakes	Mar 17–25	997 (RV)	± 3.7%	42%	47%	-	-	–	11%
Change Research	Mar 21–23	510 (LV)	–	47%	48%	-	-	5%	
Marketing Resource Group	Mar 16–20	600 (LV)	± 4.0%	41%	44%	-	-	9% (Note: "Someone else" with 6%; "Refused" and would not vote with 1%)	6%
Hodas & Associates/Hodas & Associates/Restoration PAC (R)	Mar 12–16	600 (RV)	–	44%	50%	-	-	–	–
AtlasIntel	Mar 7–9	1,100 (RV)	± 3.0%	46%	44%	-	-	10%	–
YouGov/Yahoo News	Mar 6–8	566 (RV)	–	41%	45%	-	-	6% (Note: "Other" with 4%; would not vote with 2%)	7%
Monmouth University	Mar 5–8	977 (RV)	± 3.1%	41%	48%	-	-	2%	9%
Firehouse Strategies/Øptimus	Mar 5–7	550 (RV)	± 5.3%	46%	44%	-	-	–	–
YouGov	Feb 11–20	1,249 (RV)	± 4.0%	43%	47%	-	-	–	–
Quinnipiac University	Feb 12–18	845 (RV)	± 3.4%	43%	47%	-	-	6% (Note: "Someone else" with 2%; would not vote with 4%)	3%
Expedition Strategies/Progressive Policies Institute	Feb 6–18	500 (RV)	–	43%	43%	-	-	–	14%
EPIC-MRA/Detroit Free Press	Jan 9–12	600 (LV)	± 4%	44%	50%	-	-	–	6%
Glengariff Group Inc.	Jan 3–7	600 (LV)	± 4%	43%	50%	-	-	–	5%

==== 2017–2019 polls ====
Poll source	Date(s) administered	Sample size	Margin of error	Donald Trump Republican	Joe Biden Democratic	Other	Undecided
Firehouse Strategies/Øptimus	Dec 3–5, 2019	551 (LV)	± 4.3%	46%	41%	8% (Note: A third party candidate with 5%; would not vote with 3%)	5%
Emerson College	Oct 31 – Nov 3, 2019	1,051 (RV)	± 3.0%	44%	56%	–	–
NYT Upshot/Siena College	Oct 13–25, 2019	501 (LV)	± 5.1%	44%	45%	–	–
Target Insyght	Sep 24–26, 2019	800 (LV)	–	35%	54%	–	–
Firehouse Strategies/Øptimus	Sep 7–9, 2019	529 (LV)	± 4.0%	41%	42%	17%	–
EPIC-MRA	Aug 17–21, 2019	600 (LV)	± 4.0%	41%	51%	–	8%
Climate Nexus	Jul 14–17, 2019	820 (RV)	± 4.0%	36%	49%	5% (Note: Would not vote with 5%)	10%
Firehouse Strategies/Øptimus	Jun 11–13, 2019	587 (LV)	± 4.2%	43%	46%	11%	–
EPIC-MRA	Jun 8–12, 2019	600 (LV)	± 4.0%	41%	52%	–	7%
Glengariff Group	May 28–30, 2019	600 (LV)	± 4.0%	41%	53%	–	4%
WPA Intelligence	Apr 27–30, 2019	200 (LV)	± 6.9%	42%	45%	–	12%
Firehouse Strategies/Øptimus	Mar 19–21, 2019	530 (LV)	± 4.5%	46%	45%	4%	–
Emerson College	Mar 7–10, 2019	743 (RV)	± 3.5%	46%	54%	–	–
Glengariff Group	Jan 24–26, 2019	600 (LV)	± 4.0%	40%	53%	–	5%
EPIC-MRA	Apr 28–30, 2018	600 (LV)	± 4.0%	39%	52%	–	9%
Zogby Analytics	Sep 2017	800 (V)	–	35%	52%	–	13%

Former candidates

Donald Trump vs. Michael Bloomberg

Poll source	Date(s) administered	Sample size	Margin of error	Donald Trump (R)	Michael Bloomberg (D)	Other	Undecided
Quinnipiac University	Feb 12–18, 2020	845 (RV)	±3.4%	42%	47%	7% (Note: "Someone else" with 3%; would not vote with 4%)	4%
Expedition Strategies/Progressive Policies Institute	Feb 6–18, 2020	500 (RV)	–	41%	46%	–	13%
EPIC-MRA/Detroit Free Press	Jan 9–12, 2020	600 (LV)	± 4%	42%	49%	–	9%
Glengariff Group Inc.	Jan 3–7, 2020	600 (LV)	± 4%	41%	47%	–	10%
Firehouse Strategies/Øptimus	Dec 3–5, 2019	551 (LV)	± 4.3%	48%	37%	8%	7%

Donald Trump vs. Cory Booker

Poll source	Date(s) administered	Sample size	Margin of error	Donald Trump (R)	Cory Booker (D)	Other	Undecided
Climate Nexus	Jul 14–17, 2019	820 (RV)	± 4.0%	37%	39%	7% (Note: Would not vote with 7%)	16%

Donald Trump vs. Pete Buttigieg

Poll source	Date(s) administered	Sample size	Margin of error	Donald Trump (R)	Pete Buttigieg (D)	Other	Undecided
YouGov	Feb 11–20, 2020	1,249 (RV)	±4.0%	41%	47%	–	–
Quinnipiac University	Feb 12–18, 2020	845 (RV)	±3.4%	44%	45%	8% (Note: "Someone else" with 3%; would not vote with 5%)	3%
Expedition Strategies/Progressive Policies Institute	Feb 6–18, 2020	500 (RV)	–	40%	44%	–	15%
EPIC-MRA/Detroit Free Press	Jan 9–12, 2020	600 (LV)	± 4%	43%	47%	–	10%
Glengariff Group Inc.	Jan 3–7, 2020	600 (LV)	± 4%	43%	45%	–	10%
Firehouse Strategies/Øptimus	Dec 3–5, 2019	551 (LV)	± 4.3%	48%	37%	8% (Note: A third party candidate with 4%; would not vote with 4%)	6%
Climate Nexus	Jul 14–17, 2019	820 (RV)	± 4.0%	37%	39%	7%	16%
Firehouse Strategies/Øptimus	Jun 11–13, 2019	587 (LV)	± 4.2%	44%	40%	16%	–
Glengariff Group	May 28–30, 2019	600 (LV)	± 4.0%	41%	47%	–	11%

Donald Trump vs. Kamala Harris

Poll source	Date(s) administered	Sample size	Margin of error	Donald Trump (R)	Kamala Harris (D)	Other	Undecided
EPIC-MRA	Aug 17–21, 2019	600 (LV)	± 4.0%	43%	46%	–	11%
Climate Nexus	Jul 14–17, 2019	820 (RV)	± 4.0%	38%	41%	6% (Note: Would not vote with 6%)	14%
Glengariff Group	May 28–30, 2019	600 (LV)	± 4.0%	44%	47%	–	9%
Emerson College	Mar 7–10, 2019	743 (RV)	± 3.5%	49%	51%	–	–
Glengariff Group	Jan 24–26, 2019	600 (LV)	± 4.0%	42%	47%	–	10%

Donald Trump vs. Amy Klobuchar

Poll source	Date(s) administered	Sample size	Margin of error	Donald Trump (R)	Amy Klobuchar (D)	Other	Undecided
YouGov	Feb 11–20, 2020	1,249 (RV)	± 4.0%	41%	44%	–	–
Quinnipiac University	Feb 12–18, 2020	845 (RV)	± 3.4%	44%	45%	6%	4%
Emerson College	Mar 7–10, 2019	743 (RV)	± 3.5%	47%	53%	–	–

Donald Trump vs. Beto O'Rourke

Poll source	Date(s) administered	Sample size	Margin of error	Donald Trump (R)	Beto O'Rourke (D)	Other	Undecided
Firehouse Strategies/Øptimus	Mar 19–21, 2019	530 (LV)	± 4.5%	48%	39%	8%	–

Donald Trump vs. Bernie Sanders

Poll source	Date(s) administered	Sample size	Margin of error	Donald Trump (R)	Bernie Sanders (D)	Other	Undecided
Baldwin Wallace University Great Lakes	Mar 17–25, 2020	997 (RV)	± 3.7%	42%	45%	–	13%
Hodas & Associates/Hodas & Associates/Restoration PAC (R)	Mar 12–16, 2020	600 (RV)	–	44%	49%	–	–
AtlasIntel	Mar 7–9, 2020	1,100 (RV)	± 3.0%	43%	46%	11%	–
YouGov/Yahoo News	Mar 6–8, 2020	566 (RV)	–	42%	43%	7% (Note: "Other" with 5%; would not vote with 2%)	8%
Monmouth University	Mar 5–8, 2020	977 (RV)	± 3.1%	41%	46%	2%	9%
Firehouse Strategies/Øptimus	Mar 5–7, 2020	550 (RV)	± 5.3%	48%	41%	–	–
YouGov	Feb 11–20, 2020	1,249 (RV)	± 4.0%	41%	48%	–	–
Quinnipiac University	Feb 12–18, 2020	845 (RV)	± 3.4%	43%	48%	7%	3%
Expedition Strategies/Progressive Policies Institute	Feb 6–18, 2020	500 (RV)	–	42%	46%	–	12%
EPIC-MRA/Detroit Free Press	Jan 9–12, 2020	600 (LV)	± 4%	45%	50%	–	5%
Glengariff Group Inc.	Jan 3–7, 2020	600 (LV)	± 4%	45%	49%	–	5%
Firehouse Strategies/Øptimus	Dec 3–5, 2019	551 (LV)	± 4.3%	48%	42%	6% (Note: A third party candidate with 4%; would not vote with 2%)	5%
Emerson College	Oct 31 – Nov 3, 2019	1,051 (RV)	± 3.0%	43%	57%	–	–
NYT Upshot/Siena College	Oct 13–25, 2019	501 (LV)	± 5.1%	42%	46%	–	–
Firehouse Strategies/Øptimus	Sep 7–9, 2019	529 (LV)	± 4.0%	43%	40%	17%	–
EPIC-MRA	Aug 17–21, 2019	600 (LV)	± 4.0%	44%	48%	–	8%
Climate Nexus	Jul 14–17, 2019	820 (RV)	± 4.0%	38%	47%	4% (Note: Would not vote with 4%)	11%
Firehouse Strategies/Øptimus	Jun 11–13, 2019	587 (LV)	± 4.2%	44%	44%	12%	–
Glengariff Group	May 28–30, 2019	600 (LV)	± 4.0%	41%	53%	–	5%
Tulchin Research (D) (Note: Poll sponsored by the Sanders campaign)	Apr 14–18, 2019	400 (LV)	± 4.9%	41%	52%	–	–
Firehouse Strategies/Øptimus	Mar 19–21, 2019	530 (LV)	± 4.5%	46%	45%	6%	–
Emerson College	Mar 7–10, 2019	743 (RV)	± 3.5%	47%	52%	–	–
Glengariff Group	Jan 24–26, 2019	600 (LV)	± 4.0%	41%	52%	–	6%
Zogby Analytics	Sep 2017	800 (V)	–	36%	54%	–	10%

Donald Trump vs. Elizabeth Warren

Poll source	Date(s) administered	Sample size	Margin of error	Donald Trump (R)	Elizabeth Warren (D)	Other	Undecided
YouGov	Feb 11–20, 2020	1,249 (RV)	±4.0%	43%	46%	–	–
Quinnipiac University	Feb 12–18, 2020	845 (RV)	±3.4%	43%	45%	7% (Note: "Someone else" with 2%; would not vote with 5%)	4%
EPIC-MRA/Detroit Free Press	Jan 9–12, 2020	600 (LV)	± 4%	45%	48%	–	7%
Glengariff Group Inc.	Jan 3–7, 2020	600 (LV)	± 4%	44%	46%	–	8%
Firehouse Strategies/Øptimus	Dec 3–5, 2019	551 (LV)	± 4.3%	47%	38%	8% (Note: A third party candidate with 3%; would not vote with 5%)	6%
Emerson College	Oct 31 – Nov 3, 2019	1,051 (RV)	± 3.0%	46%	54%	–	–
NYT Upshot/Siena College	Oct 13–25, 2019	501 (LV)	± 5.1%	45%	40%	–	–
Firehouse Strategies/Øptimus	Sep 7–9, 2019	529 (LV)	± 4.0%	42%	41%	17%	–
EPIC-MRA	Aug 17–21, 2019	600 (LV)	± 4.0%	43%	49%	–	8%
Climate Nexus	Jul 14–17, 2019	820 (RV)	± 4.0%	38%	44%	6%	12%
Firehouse Strategies/Øptimus	Jun 11–13, 2019	587 (LV)	± 4.2%	43%	41%	16%	–
Glengariff Group	May 28–30, 2019	600 (LV)	± 4.0%	43%	47%	–	9%
Emerson College	Mar 7–10, 2019	743 (RV)	± 3.5%	49%	51%	–	–
Glengariff Group	Jan 24–26, 2019	600 (LV)	± 4.0%	43%	46%	–	10%
Zogby Analytics	Sep 2017	800 (V)	–	37%	46%	–	17%
Zogby Analytics	Aug 17–23, 2017	803 (LV)	± 3.5%	35%	51%	–	14%

Hypothetical polling

with Donald Trump, Joe Biden, and Justin Amash

Poll source	Date(s) administered	Sample size	Margin of error	Donald Trump (R)	Joe Biden (D)	Justin Amash (L)	Undecided
Glengariff Group	May 28–30, 2019	600 (LV)	± 4.0%	39%	45%	10%	6%

with Donald Trump, Joe Biden, and Howard Schultz

Poll source	Date(s) administered	Sample size	Margin of error	Donald Trump (R)	Joe Biden (D)	Howard Schultz (I)	Undecided
Emerson College	Mar 7–10, 2019	743 (RV)	± 3.5%	44%	52%	4%	–

with Donald Trump, Bernie Sanders, and Howard Schultz

Poll source	Date(s) administered	Sample size	Margin of error	Donald Trump (R)	Bernie Sanders (D)	Howard Schultz (I)	Undecided
Emerson College	Mar 7–10, 2019	743 (RV)	± 3.5%	45%	49%	6%	–

with Donald Trump and Generic Democrat

Poll source	Date(s) administered	Sample size	Margin of error	Donald Trump (R)	Generic Democrat (D)	Undecided
Baldwin Wallace University/Oakland University/Ohio Northern University	Mar 17–25, 2020	997 (RV)	± 3.7%	43.2% (Note: Figures for each candidate in this poll include undecided voters who were reported to lean towards that candidate at the time of polling.)	54.0%	2.9% (Note: "It depends on who the Democrats nominate" with 1.9%; "unsure" with 1%)
Expedition Strategies/Progressive Policies Institute	Feb 6–18, 2020	500 (RV)	–	38%	50%	11%
Baldwin Wallace University/Oakland University/Ohio Northern University	Jan 8–20, 2020	1,023 (RV)	± 3.1%	36.4%	50.3%	13.3%
KFF/Cook Political Report	Sep 23 – Oct 15, 2019	767 (RV)	± 4%	27%	39%	25%

with Donald Trump and Generic Opponent

Poll source	Date(s) administered	Sample size	Margin of error	Donald Trump (R)	Generic Opponent	Undecided
EPIC-MRA	Jul 25 - 30, 2020	600 (LV)	± 4%	37%	49% (Note: Listed as "Would vote to replace Trump")	14%
EPIC-MRA	May 31 – Jun 4, 2020	600 (LV)	± 4%	33%	51%	13% (Note: Listed as "would consider voting for someone other than Trump")
EPIC-MRA	May 30 – Jun 3, 2020	600 (LV)	± 4%	38%	51%	8%
EPIC-MRA/Detroit Free Press	Jan 9–12, 2020	600 (LV)	± 4%	34%	44%	22% (Note: 19% listed as "would consider voting for someone other than Trump"; 3% as "undecided/refused")
EPIC-MRA	Jun 8–12, 2019	600 (LV)	± 4%	32%	45% (Note: "Vote to replace Trump" with 45%)	23% (Note: "Consider voting for someone else" with 19%; "Undecided/refused" with 4%)
EPIC-MRA/Detroit Free Press	Mar 3–7, 2019	600 (LV)	± 4%	31%	49% (Note: "Vote to replace Trump" with 49%)	20% (Note: "Consider voting for someone else" with 16%; "Don't know/refused" with 4%)
Glengariff Group/WDIV/Detroit News	Jan 24–26, 2019	600 (LV)	± 4%	31%	53%	15% (Note: "Depends on who the Democratic nominee is" with 15%)

=== Results ===
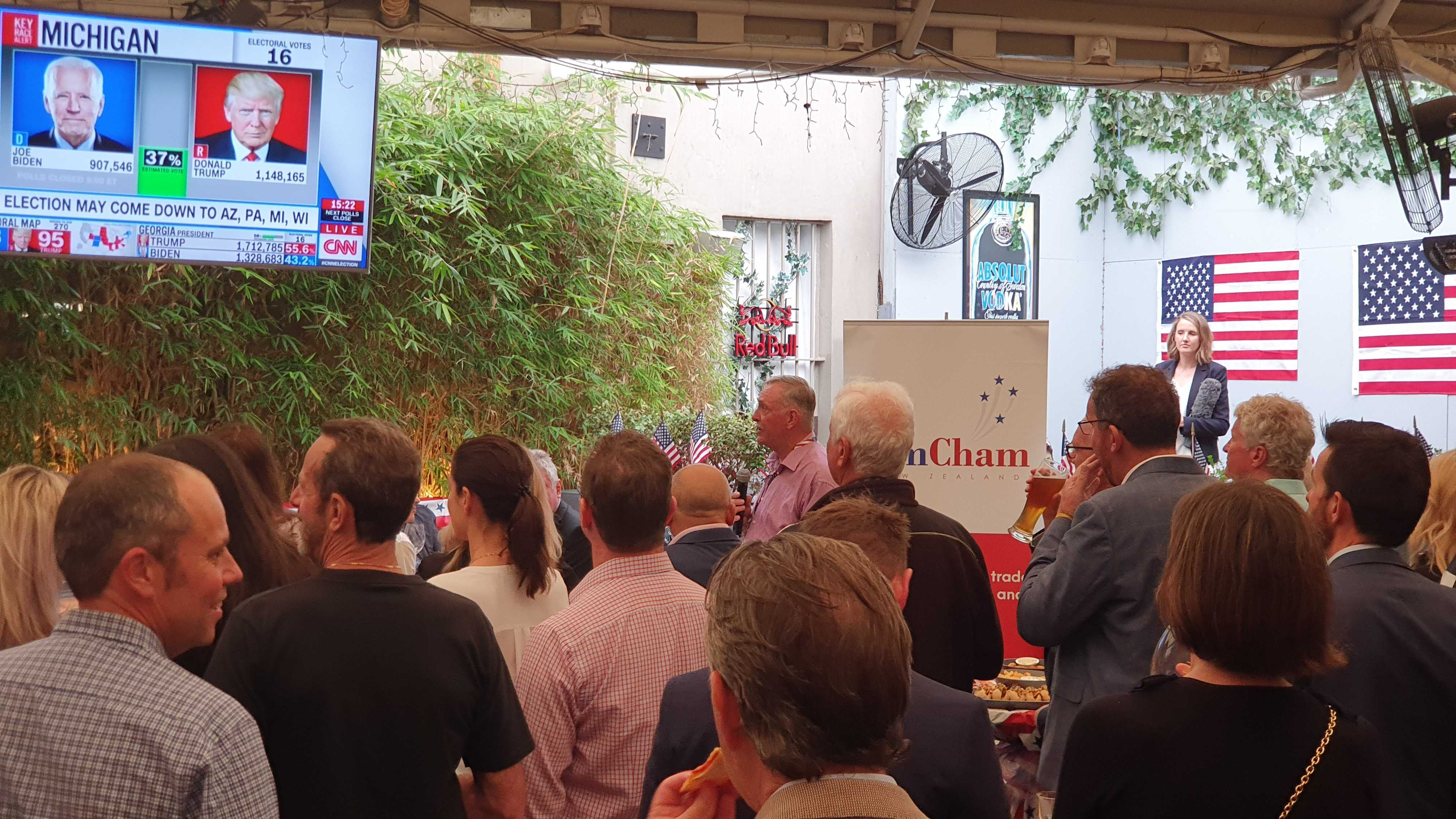
People at the United States Embassy in New Zealand watch as the results from Michigan are released on CNN, 5 November 2020.

2020 United States presidential election in Michigan
Party	Candidate	Votes	%	±%
Democratic	Joe Biden Kamala Harris	2,804,040	50.62%	+3.35%
Republican	Donald Trump Mike Pence	2,649,852	47.84%	+0.34%
Libertarian	Jo Jorgensen Spike Cohen	60,381	1.09%	−2.50%
Green	Howie Hawkins Angela Walker	13,718	0.25%	−0.82%
U.S. Taxpayers'	Don Blankenship William Mohr	7,235	0.13%	N/A
Natural Law	Rocky De La Fuente Darcy Richardson	2,986	0.05%	N/A
Write-in	Brian T. Carroll	963	0.02%	+0.01%
Write-in	Jade Simmons	89	<0.01%	N/A
Write-in	Tom Hoefling	32	<0.01%	N/A
Write-in		6	<0.01%	N/A
Total votes		5,539,302	100.00%	

==== By county ====
County	Joe Biden Democratic		Donald Trump Republican		Various candidates Other parties		Margin		Total votes cast
County	#	%	#	%	#	%	#	%	Total votes cast
Alcona	2,142	30.32%	4,848	68.63%	74	1.05%	−2,706	−38.31%	7,064
Alger	2,053	39.98%	3,014	58.70%	68	1.32%	−961	−18.72%	5,135
Allegan	24,449	36.39%	41,392	61.60%	1,354	2.01%	−16,943	−25.21%	67,195
Alpena	6,000	35.32%	10,686	62.91%	301	1.77%	−4,686	−27.59%	16,987
Antrim	5,960	37.32%	9,748	61.03%	264	1.65%	−3,788	−23.71%	15,972
Arenac	2,774	31.38%	5,928	67.07%	137	1.55%	−3,154	−35.69%	8,839
Baraga	1,478	36.52%	2,512	62.07%	57	1.41%	−1,034	−25.55%	4,047
Barry	11,797	32.80%	23,471	65.27%	693	1.93%	−11,674	−32.47%	35,961
Bay	26,151	43.34%	33,125	54.90%	1,057	1.76%	−6,974	−11.56%	60,333
Benzie	5,480	44.69%	6,601	53.83%	181	1.48%	−1,121	−9.14%	12,262
Berrien	37,438	45.34%	43,519	52.71%	1,608	1.95%	−6,081	−7.37%	82,565
Branch	6,159	29.94%	14,064	68.36%	350	1.70%	−7,905	−38.42%	20,573
Calhoun	28,877	43.57%	36,221	54.65%	1,183	1.78%	−5,344	−11.08%	66,281
Cass	9,130	34.79%	16,699	63.63%	413	1.58%	−7,569	−28.84%	26,242
Charlevoix	6,939	40.75%	9,841	57.79%	250	1.46%	−2,902	−17.04%	17,030
Cheboygan	5,437	34.22%	10,186	64.10%	267	1.68%	−4,749	−29.88%	15,890
Chippewa	6,648	37.62%	10,681	60.44%	342	1.94%	−4,033	−22.82%	17,671
Clare	5,199	31.91%	10,861	66.65%	235	1.44%	−5,662	−34.74%	16,295
Clinton	21,968	45.84%	25,098	52.37%	861	1.79%	−3,130	−6.53%	47,927
Crawford	2,672	33.99%	5,087	64.71%	102	1.30%	−2,415	−30.72%	7,861
Delta	7,606	35.93%	13,207	62.39%	354	1.68%	−5,601	−26.46%	21,167
Dickinson	4,744	32.46%	9,617	65.80%	254	1.74%	−4,873	−33.34%	14,615
Eaton	31,299	48.66%	31,798	49.43%	1,230	1.91%	−499	−0.77%	64,327
Emmet	9,662	43.50%	12,135	54.64%	412	1.86%	−2,473	−11.14%	22,209
Genesee	119,390	53.84%	98,714	44.51%	3,660	1.65%	20,676	9.33%	221,764
Gladwin	4,524	30.95%	9,893	67.69%	198	1.36%	−5,369	−36.74%	14,615
Gogebic	3,570	43.14%	4,600	55.58%	106	1.28%	−1,030	−12.44%	8,276
Grand Traverse	28,683	47.53%	30,502	50.54%	1,168	1.93%	−1,819	−3.01%	60,353
Gratiot	6,693	34.95%	12,102	63.20%	353	1.85%	−5,409	−28.25%	19,148
Hillsdale	5,883	25.25%	17,037	73.11%	382	1.64%	−11,154	−47.86%	23,302
Houghton	7,750	41.82%	10,378	56.00%	405	2.18%	−2,628	−14.18%	18,533
Huron	5,490	29.77%	12,731	69.03%	221	1.20%	−7,241	−39.26%	18,442
Ingham	94,212	65.18%	47,639	32.96%	2,699	1.86%	46,573	32.22%	144,550
Ionia	10,901	33.84%	20,657	64.13%	651	2.03%	−9,756	−30.29%	32,209
Iosco	5,373	34.92%	9,759	63.42%	255	1.66%	−4,386	−28.50%	15,387
Iron	2,493	36.69%	4,216	62.05%	86	1.26%	−1,723	−25.36%	6,795
Isabella	14,072	47.74%	14,815	50.26%	589	2.00%	−743	−2.52%	29,476
Jackson	31,995	39.49%	47,372	58.47%	1,647	2.04%	−15,377	−18.98%	81,014
Kalamazoo	83,686	58.22%	56,823	39.53%	3,237	2.25%	26,863	18.69%	143,746
Kalkaska	3,002	28.24%	7,436	69.95%	193	1.81%	−4,434	−41.71%	10,631
Kent	187,915	51.91%	165,741	45.78%	8,375	2.31%	22,174	6.13%	362,031
Keweenaw	672	43.16%	862	55.36%	23	1.48%	−190	−12.20%	1,557
Lake	2,288	36.13%	3,946	62.32%	98	1.55%	−1,658	−26.19%	6,332
Lapeer	16,367	31.04%	35,482	67.29%	883	1.67%	−19,115	−36.25%	52,732
Leelanau	8,795	52.04%	7,916	46.84%	189	1.12%	879	5.20%	16,900
Lenawee	20,918	39.13%	31,541	59.01%	993	1.86%	−10,623	−19.88%	53,452
Livingston	48,220	37.91%	76,982	60.52%	1,995	1.57%	−28,762	−22.61%	127,197
Luce	842	28.00%	2,109	70.14%	56	1.86%	−1,277	−42.14%	3,007
Mackinac	2,632	37.47%	4,304	61.27%	89	1.26%	−1,772	−23.80%	7,025
Macomb	223,952	45.31%	263,863	53.39%	6,441	1.30%	−39,911	−8.08%	494,256
Manistee	6,107	41.60%	8,321	56.69%	251	1.71%	−2,214	−15.09%	14,679
Marquette	20,465	54.50%	16,286	43.37%	799	2.13%	4,179	11.13%	37,550
Mason	6,802	39.36%	10,207	59.06%	274	1.58%	−3,405	−19.70%	17,283
Mecosta	7,375	34.98%	13,267	62.93%	439	2.09%	−5,892	−27.95%	21,081
Menominee	4,316	34.20%	8,117	64.31%	188	1.49%	−3,801	−30.11%	12,621
Midland	20,493	41.67%	27,675	56.28%	1,007	2.05%	−7,182	−14.61%	49,175
Missaukee	1,967	22.47%	6,648	75.93%	140	1.60%	−4,681	−53.46%	8,755
Monroe	32,980	37.78%	52,722	60.39%	1,597	1.83%	−19,742	−22.61%	87,299
Montcalm	9,703	30.19%	21,815	67.88%	620	1.93%	−12,112	−37.69%	32,138
Montmorency	1,628	27.77%	4,171	71.14%	64	1.09%	−2,543	−43.37%	5,863
Muskegon	45,643	49.37%	45,133	48.82%	1,668	1.81%	510	0.55%	92,444
Newaygo	7,873	28.95%	18,857	69.33%	467	1.72%	−10,984	−40.38%	27,197
Oakland	434,148	56.24%	325,971	42.22%	11,872	1.54%	108,177	14.02%	771,991
Oceana	4,944	35.11%	8,892	63.15%	244	1.74%	−3,948	−28.04%	14,080
Ogemaw	3,475	29.15%	8,253	69.23%	193	1.62%	−4,778	−40.08%	11,921
Ontonagon	1,391	36.51%	2,358	61.89%	61	1.60%	−967	−25.38%	3,810
Osceola	3,214	26.05%	8,928	72.35%	198	1.60%	−5,714	−46.30%	12,340
Oscoda	1,342	27.50%	3,466	71.02%	72	1.48%	−2,124	−43.52%	4,880
Otsego	4,743	32.10%	9,779	66.19%	253	1.71%	−5,036	−34.09%	14,775
Ottawa	64,705	38.35%	100,913	59.81%	3,095	1.84%	−36,208	−21.46%	168,713
Presque Isle	2,911	34.84%	5,342	63.94%	102	1.22%	−2,431	−29.10%	8,355
Roscommon	5,166	34.36%	9,670	64.32%	198	1.32%	−4,504	−29.96%	15,034
Saginaw	51,088	49.37%	50,785	49.08%	1,610	1.55%	303	0.29%	103,483
St. Clair	31,363	34.02%	59,185	64.19%	1,654	1.79%	−27,822	−30.17%	92,202
St. Joseph	9,262	33.10%	18,127	64.78%	592	2.12%	−8,865	−31.68%	27,981
Sanilac	5,966	26.58%	16,194	72.15%	286	1.27%	−10,228	−45.57%	22,446
Schoolcraft	1,589	33.49%	3,090	65.12%	66	1.39%	−1,501	−31.63%	4,745
Shiawassee	15,347	39.05%	23,149	58.90%	805	2.05%	−7,802	−19.85%	39,301
Tuscola	8,712	29.55%	20,297	68.85%	470	1.60%	−11,585	−39.30%	29,479
Van Buren	16,803	42.92%	21,591	55.16%	752	1.92%	−4,788	−12.24%	39,146
Washtenaw	157,136	72.44%	56,241	25.93%	3,554	1.63%	100,895	46.51%	216,931
Wayne	597,170	68.32%	264,553	30.27%	12,295	1.41%	332,617	38.05%	874,018
Wexford	5,838	31.92%	12,102	66.16%	352	1.92%	−6,264	−34.24%	18,292
Totals	2,804,045	50.55%	2,649,864	47.77%	93,277	1.68%	154,181	2.78%	5,547,186

Counties that flipped from Republican to Democratic

- Leelanau (largest municipality: Greilickville)
- Kent (largest municipality: Grand Rapids)
- Saginaw (largest municipality: Saginaw)

==== By congressional district ====
Despite losing the state, Trump won eight out of the 14 congressional districts in Michigan, including one that elected a Democrat.

District	Trump	Biden	Representative
1st	58%	41%	Jack Bergman
2nd	55%	43%	Bill Huizenga
3rd	51%	47%	Justin Amash
3rd	51%	47%	Peter Meijer
4th	61%	37%	John Moolenaar
5th	47%	51%	Dan Kildee
6th	51%	47%	Fred Upton
7th	57%	42%	Tim Walberg
8th	50%	49%	Elissa Slotkin
9th	43%	56%	Andy Levin
10th	64%	34%	Paul Mitchell
10th	64%	34%	Lisa McClain
11th	47%	52%	Haley Stevens
12th	34%	64%	Debbie Dingell
13th	20%	79%	Rashida Tlaib
14th	20%	80%	Brenda Lawrence

== Analysis ==
Michigan was generally seen as one of the most critical states of the 2020 election; the state boasted a highly prized 16 electoral votes, and had been part of the blue wall since Bill Clinton won the state in 1992. It was key to Trump's surprise victory in 2016, and the Biden campaign paid heavy attention to the state throughout the campaign, looking to avoid a repeat of Hillary Clinton's unexpected collapse in the northern industrial states.

Biden would carry the state by just under 2.8%; while Biden ran well behind Barack Obama in his two campaigns, his margin of victory was nearly in-line for a Democratic candidate, only performing slightly worse than John Kerry's 3.4% margin in 2004, and Al Gore's 5.1% margin in 2000, reflecting some of the steady demographic shifts in the state. Many undecided/third-party voters that had been lost by Clinton appeared to return to the Democratic column, giving Biden enough votes to carry the state.

While Michigan returned to the Democratic column with a somewhat comfortable margin, the state's internal politics shifted rather dramatically. Trump performed strongly with white voters without a college degree, winning this group by 17 points, and this group made up about 51% of Michigan's electorate, cementing the white-working-class shift to the GOP; with men, this was even more convincing, as Trump carried white men without a college degree by 30 points. On the other hand, there was a significant suburban shift towards the Democrats; for example, Ottawa County, a suburban county outside of Grand Rapids, has traditionally been a GOP-stronghold in the state; Biden cut into Trump's margins here, and Trump carried this county with less than 60%. Trump held Macomb County, which famously helped him clinch Michigan in 2016, but carried it by only 8 points, 3 points fewer than in 2016.

Other demographic patterns remained the same. Biden won 93% of African-American voters in the state; consequently, Biden improved from Clinton's performance in Wayne County, home of Detroit. Biden's performance among black voters would carry on in other parts of the state; Biden was able to match Clinton's performance in Genesee County, and flipped back Saginaw County.

Biden performed strongly with Michigan's different religious groups; Biden was able to improve from Clinton in the vote share with Evangelical Michiganders. More importantly, Biden performed strongly with white Catholics, who make up a large portion of Michigan's electorate. Much of the state's sizable Muslim and Arab American voters backed Biden in the election, in which their support was seen as being important for helping Biden secure victory in Michigan.

Jeremy W. Peters of The New York Times wrote that "high Detroit turnout" was a crucial factor aiding Biden. African Americans in Detroit were a major demographic contributing to Joe Biden winning that state. Trump received 12,600 votes in Detroit proper, an increase from the previous election's 7,700. In percentage terms, the shift in Detroit was from Clinton 95–3 to Biden 94–5, a decreased margin from 92 points in 2016 to 89 in 2020. Biden saw increases from 2016 in Oakland and Washtenaw counties.

The 2020 election in Oakland County by municipality (certain villages like Holly not shown).

The 2020 election in Wayne County by municipality.

In Oakland County, Biden won 433,982 votes, making up 56.36% of the votes. The municipalities in Oakland County that majority-voted for Biden versus Trump included Bloomfield Township, Farmington Hills, Madison Heights, Novi, Rochester Hills, Southfield and Troy.

The number of unbalanced votes in Wayne County for 2020 was below the same number for 2016. On November 23, 2020, Michigan certified the results 3–0, with Norm Shinkle abstaining.

=== Edison exit polls ===
2020 presidential election in Michigan by demographic subgroup (Edison exit polling)
Demographic subgroup	Biden	Trump	% of total vote
Total vote	50.62	47.84	100
Ideology
Liberals	89	10	25
Moderates	62	36	38
Conservatives	12	88	37
Party
Democrats	97	3	38
Republicans	6	94	38
Independents	51	45	23
Gender
Men	44	54	46
Women	57	43	54
Race/ethnicity
White	44	55	81
Black	92	7	12
Latino	55	44	3
Asian	–	–	1
Other	–	–	4
Age
18–24 years old	62	36	7
25–29 years old	59	37	4
30–39 years old	48	50	14
40–49 years old	49	49	15
50–64 years old	51	49	29
65 and older	51	49	30
Sexual orientation
LGBT	–	–	6
Not LGBT	53	47	94
Education
High school or less	49	50	20
Some college education	49	50	27
Associate degree	42	57	18
Bachelor's degree	55	44	20
Postgraduate degree	63	37	16
Income
Under $30,000	61	39	16
$30,000–49,999	60	39	20
$50,000–99,999	55	44	34
Over $100,000	47	51	30
Union households
Yes	62	37	21
No	48	51	79
Issue regarded as most important
Racial inequality	93	5	16
Coronavirus	94	5	18
Economy	14	86	39
Crime and safety	22	77	9
Health care	85	12	10
Region
Wayne County	69	30	16
Southeast	58	41	27
East central	42	57	24
Southwest	46	53	19
North central/Upper Peninsula	40	59	14
Area type
Urban	65	35	21
Suburban	48	51	58
Rural	45	54	21
Family's financial situation today
Better than four years ago	18	81	41
Worse than four years ago	90	9	15
About the same	72	27	43

== Aftermath ==
On November 5, a state judge in Michigan dismissed the Trump campaign's lawsuit requesting a pause in vote-counting to allow access to observers, as the judge noted that vote-counting had already finished in Michigan. That judge also noted the official complaint did not state "why, when, where, or by whom" an election observer was allegedly blocked from observing ballot-counting in Michigan.

On election night in Antrim County, human error miscounted an unofficial tally of Presidential votes. The next day, the County Clerk pulled the unofficial tally offline. The error was caused by using different kinds of ballots when setting up ballot scanners and result-reporting systems, which mismatched results. The Republican Clerk admitted that she made a mistake in some precincts, which mismatched precinct results. The very next day, she corrected her mistake, tabulated all ballots again and ran a final report to certify Trump's overwhelming win. Nonetheless, this error and a related lawsuit fueled multiple election conspiracy theories.

Despite pressure from the Trump campaign to hand the decision over the state's presidential electors to the Michigan State Legislature, which would have been an unprecedented maneuver in state history and was not authorized under Michigan law, the statewide results were certified in favor of the Biden/Harris ticket on November 23, with one Republican member of the Michigan Board of State Canvassers abstaining.

=== Official audits ===
In October 2020, the Michigan Election Security Advisory Commission published recommendations for two types of post-election audits: procedural and tabulation audits. The first statewide risk-limiting audit included a hand tally of the sampled ballots, which confirmed that Biden received more votes than Trump and the share of votes each candidate received was within a fraction of a percentage point of the certified results. Another tabulation audit confirmed the election results by examining ballots cast, voting machines and the election procedures. The series of post-election audits was the most comprehensive in the state's history.

In Antrim County, the Clerk's Office was joined by a bipartisan team of clerks to perform a hand recount of every single ballot. Their recount proved that the county's election results had been accurately certified. The Republican Chairman concluded in a letter prefacing his state Senate Oversight Committee's election report: "all compelling theories that sprang forth from the rumors surrounding Antrim County are diminished so significantly as for it to be a complete waste of time to consider them further."

After eight months investigating the state's 2020 general election process, he and his Republican Committee members all voted for the Senate to adopt their report. Their report concluded, "The Committee found no evidence of widespread or systemic fraud in Michigan's prosecution of the 2020 election."

=== Election law changes since then ===
Due to voters approving no-reason-required absentee voting in 2018 and the COVID pandemic, there was a record number of absentee voters. Michigan law at that time did not allow for the tabulating of absentee ballots until after the polling place ballots were counted. That led to days before Biden was declared the winner. In 2022, voters approved a ballot proposal making it easier to vote. In the aftermath, Michigan lawmakers made changes in election laws which, among other things, allowed cities and townships to begin tabulating absentee ballots before Election Day.

== See also ==
- United States presidential elections in Michigan
- 2020 Michigan elections
- 2020 United States elections
- Post-election lawsuits related to the 2020 United States presidential election from Michigan
- Attempts to overturn the 2020 United States presidential election

== Notes ==
Partisan clients

Voter samples and additional candidates
