= 2020 South Carolina Democratic presidential primary =

- February 29, 2020

64 delegates (54 pledged, 10 unpledged) to the Democratic National Convention The number of pledged delegates won is determined by the popular vote

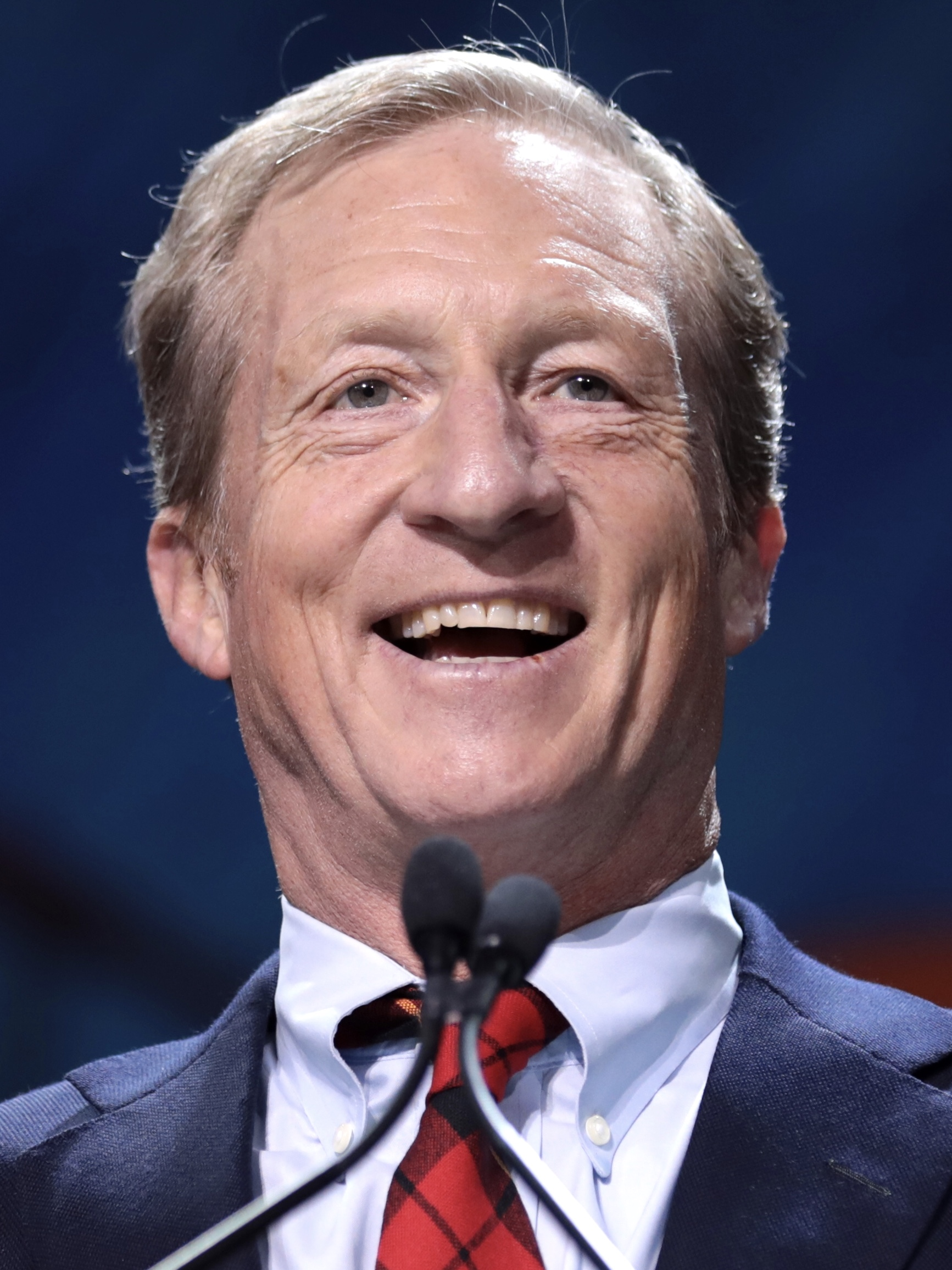

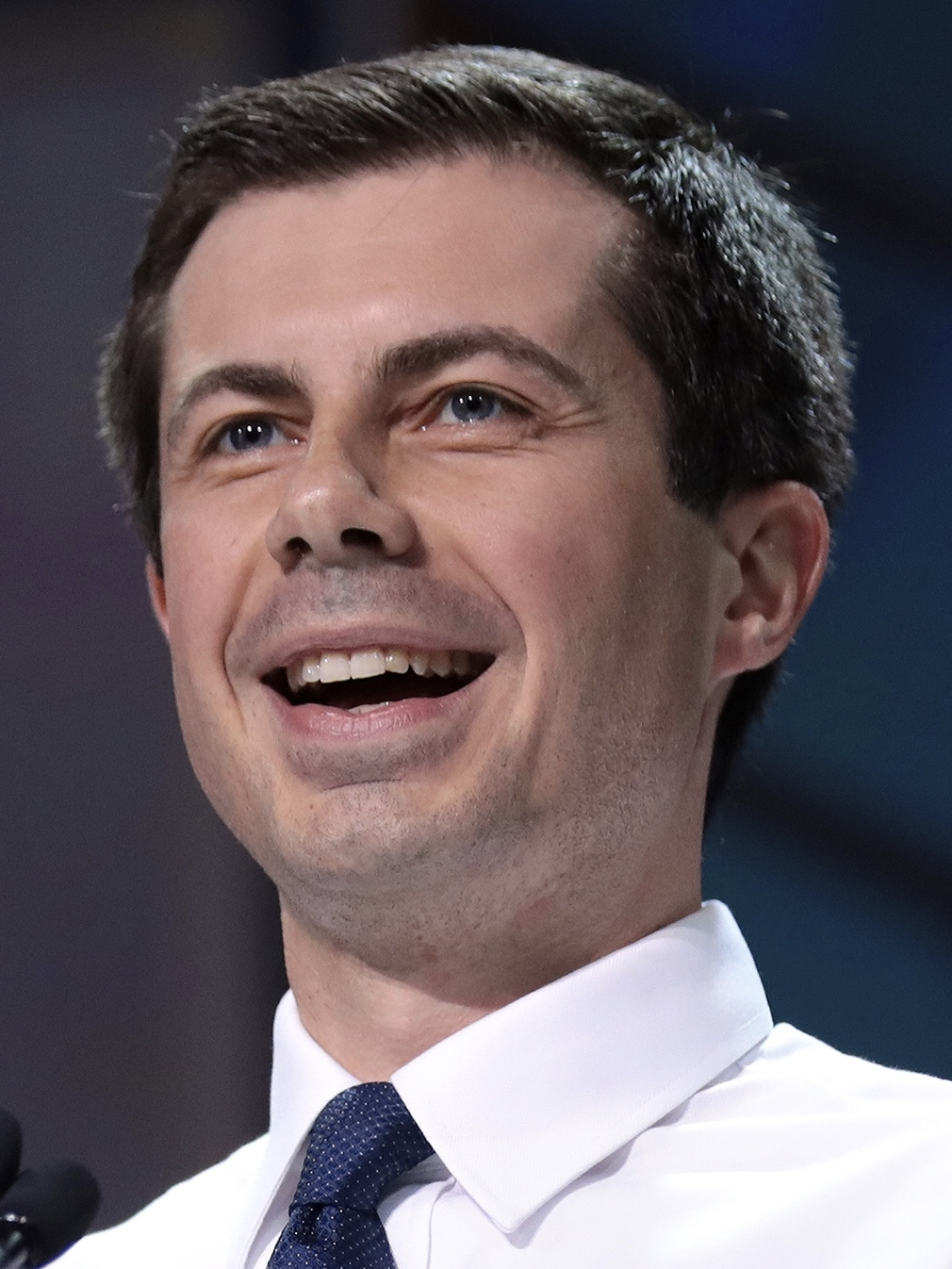

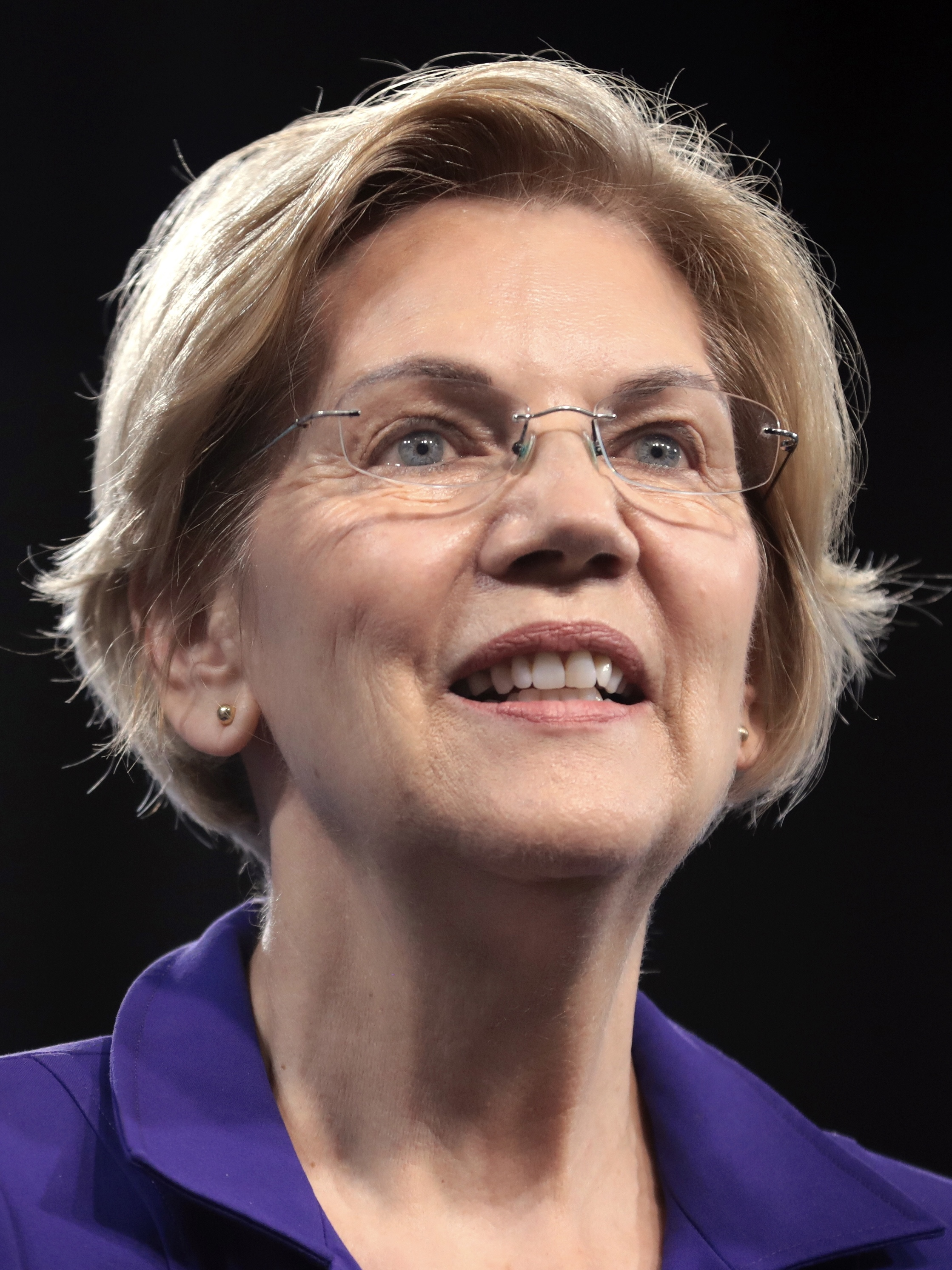
Candidate	Joe Biden	Bernie Sanders	Tom Steyer
Home state	Delaware	Vermont	California
Delegate count	39	15	0
Popular vote	262,336	106,605	61,140
Percentage	48.65%	19.77%	11.34%
Candidate	Pete Buttigieg	Elizabeth Warren
Home state	Indiana	Massachusetts
Delegate count	0	0
Popular vote	44,217	38,120
Percentage	8.20%	7.07%

Biden
30–40%
40–50%
50–60%
60–70%
70–80%

The 2020 South Carolina Democratic presidential primary took place on February 29, 2020, and was the fourth nominating contest in the Democratic Party primaries for the 2020 presidential election. The South Carolina primary was an open primary and awarded 64 delegates to the 2020 Democratic National Convention, of which 54 were pledged delegates allocated on the basis of the results of the primary. Former vice president Joe Biden and senator Bernie Sanders were the only candidates to earn delegates. Biden won 48.7% of the popular vote and notably placed first in every county in the state; it was his first ever win in a presidential primary. Sanders came in second place and won 19.8% of the popular vote. Businessman Tom Steyer, who had staked his entire campaign on the state, placed third but did not surpass the threshold and dropped out of the race, endorsing Biden.

The primary was widely interpreted as a turning point for the 2020 primaries, with Joe Biden gaining momentum going into the pivotal Super Tuesday races three days later. Following successes in the previous primaries, former mayor Pete Buttigieg and senator Amy Klobuchar received very disappointing results and initially wanted to stay in the race, but they both suspended their campaigns shortly before Super Tuesday and endorsed Biden on the day before. While Biden and former mayor Michael Bloomberg were left as the only moderates afterwards, the majority coalesced around Biden in the race against left-wing candidates Sanders and senator Elizabeth Warren.

== Procedure ==
Primary elections were held on Saturday, February 29, 2020. In the open primary, candidates had to meet a viability threshold of 15 percent at the congressional district or statewide level in order to be considered viable. The 54 pledged delegates to the 2020 Democratic National Convention were allocated proportionally on the basis of the results of the primary. Of these, 35 were allocated on the basis of the results within each congressional district, between 3 and 8 were allocated to each of the state's seven congressional districts. Another 7 were allocated to party leaders and elected officials (PLEO delegates), in addition to 12 at-large delegates.

The precinct reorganization meetings subsequently were held on March 14, 2020, to choose delegates for the county conventions, directly followed by county conventions until March 31, to elect delegates to the state convention. On May 30, 2020, the state convention met in Columbia to elect all pledged national convention delegates. Delegates were allowed to participate from remote places due to the COVID-19 pandemic. The delegation also included 10 unpledged PLEO delegates: 8 members of the Democratic National Committee and 2 representatives from Congress.

Voting was done by each voter selecting choices on a screen, so the machine printed a ballot with chosen names and a bar code. Voters could check the printed names before putting the ballot in the ballot box, though few do that. A scanner counted the bar codes, not the names, and no audit was required to check if the machines worked correctly.

Voters could absentee vote in-person until February 28, 2020, at 5:00 pm local time (EST) or submit absentee votes by mail. Election officials recommended applying to absentee vote by-mail a week in advance so that voters had time to receive their absentee ballot and mail it in by election day. Polling places closed at 7:00 pm; however, anyone standing in line at 7:00 pm were still allowed to vote.

Pledged national convention delegates
Type	Del.
CD1	6
CD2	4
CD3	3
CD4	4
CD5	5
CD6	8
CD7	5
PLEO	7
At-large	12
Total pledged delegates	54

== Candidates ==
There was a $20,000 filing fee to get on the ballot, the largest in the nation. Along with the filing fee, an application was required to be submitted to the South Carolina State committee by December 4, 2019.

The following candidates were placed on the ballot:

- Joe Biden
- Pete Buttigieg
- Tulsi Gabbard
- Amy Klobuchar
- Bernie Sanders
- Tom Steyer
- Elizabeth Warren
- Michael Bennet (withdrawn)
- Cory Booker (withdrawn)
- John Delaney (withdrawn)
- Deval Patrick (withdrawn)
- Andrew Yang (withdrawn)

Additionally, Julian Castro and Marianne Williamson were both accepted onto the ballot, but withdrew soon enough that they did not appear on the ballot. Write-in votes are not permitted in South Carolina party primaries.

== Polling ==
Polling aggregation
Source of poll aggregation	Date updated	Dates polled	Joe Biden	Bernie Sanders	Tom Steyer	Pete Buttigieg	Elizabeth Warren	Amy Klobuchar	Tulsi Gabbard	Un- decided (Note: Calculated by taking the difference of 100% and all other candidates combined; Bloomberg included as write-in votes are not permitted in SC primaries)
270 to Win	Feb 28, 2020	Feb 23–27, 2020	35.8%	20.2%	13.4%	10.0%	8.2%	5.0%	2.6%	4.8%
RealClear Politics	Feb 28, 2020	Feb 23–27, 2020	39.7%	24.3%	11.7%	11.3%	6.0%	5.7%	2.3%	– (Note: Candidate percentages add up to more than 100%)
FiveThirtyEight	Feb 28, 2020	until Feb 27, 2020 (Note: FiveThirtyEight aggregates polls with a trendline regression of polls rather than a strict average of recent polls.)	38.4%	19.1%	12.4%	8.5%	7.0%	4.3%	2.6%	7.7% (Note: Bloomberg 10.3%; Write-in votes are not permitted in SC primaries; this appears to be based on trendline regression)
Average			38.0%	21.2%	12.5%	9.9%	7.1%	5.0%	2.5%	4.9% (Note: Bloomberg only in 538, so no average can be made)
South Carolina primary results (February 29, 2020)			48.7%	19.8%	11.3%	8.2%	7.1%	3.1%	1.3%	–

– Debate qualifying poll as designated by the Democratic National Committee

Polling in January and February 2020
Poll source	Date(s) administered	Sample size (Note: Key: A – all adults RV – registered voters LV – likely voters V – unclear)	Margin of error	Joe Biden	Michael Bloomberg	Pete Buttigieg	Tulsi Gabbard	Amy Klobuchar	Bernie Sanders	Tom Steyer	Elizabeth Warren	Andrew Yang	Other	Undecided
South Carolina primary (popular vote)	Feb 29, 2020	–	–	48.65%	–	8.2%	1.26%	3.13%	19.77%	11.34%	7.07%	0.2%	0.38% (Note: Bennet with 0.14%; Booker with 0.12%; Delaney with 0.07%; Patrick with 0.05%)	–
Atlas Intel	Feb 25–28, 2020	477 (LV)	± 4.0%	35%	–	8%	2%	4%	24%	12%	7%	–	2%	6%
Emerson College	Feb 26–27, 2020	550 (LV)	± 4.1%	41%	–	11%	2%	6%	25%	11%	5%	–	–	–
Trafalgar Group	Feb 26–27, 2020	1,081 (LV)	± 2.99%	43.9%	–	9.6%	1.7%	5.9%	22.8%	10.5%	5.6%	–	–	–
Data for Progress	Feb 23–27, 2020	1416 (LV)	± 2.6%	34%	–	13%	3%	5%	25%	13%	7%	–	–	–
Change Research / Post and Courier	Feb 23–27, 2020	543 (LV)	± 5.1%	28%	–	11%	5%	4%	24%	16%	12%	–	–	1%
Starboard Communications	Feb 26, 2020	1,102 (LV)	± 2.82%	40%	–	9%	2%	6%	11%	12%	9%	–	–	12%
	Feb 25, 2020	Tenth Democratic primary debate												
Monmouth University	Feb 23–25, 2020	454 (LV)	± 4.6%	36%	–	6%	1%	4%	16%	15%	8%	–	0%	15%
Clemson University	Feb 17–25, 2020	650 (LV)	± 3.8%	35%	–	8%	2%	4%	13%	17%	8%	–	–	12%
East Carolina University	Feb 23–24, 2020	1,142 (LV)	± 3.37%	31%	–	6%	2%	2%	23%	20%	8%	–	–	8%
Public Policy Polling	Feb 23–24, 2020	866 (LV)	± 3.3%	36%	–	7%	6%	3%	21%	7%	8%	–	–	11% (Note: Reported as "Someone else/Undecided")
	Feb 22, 2020	Nevada caucuses												
YouGov/CBS News	Feb 20–22, 2020	1,238 (LV)	± 5.5%	28%	–	10%	1%	4%	23%	18%	12%	–	3% (Note: "Someone else" with 3%)	1%
Marist Poll/NBC News	Feb 18–21, 2020	539 (LV)	± 6.0%	27%	–	9%	3%	5%	23%	15%	8%	–	2% (Note: "Other" with 2%)	9%
Marist Poll/NBC News	Feb 18–21, 2020	997 (RV)	± 4.0%	25%	–	9%	3%	5%	24%	15%	8%	–	2% (Note: "Other" with 2%)	9%
Winthrop University	Feb 9–19, 2020	443 (LV)	± 4.7%	24%	–	7%	1%	4%	19%	15%	6%	1% (Note: Accumulated responses until he withdrew; name not included afterwards.)	2% (Note: "Someone else" with 2%; Bennet and Patrick were included until they withdrew; Bennet received no voters; Patrick accumulated few enough to round down to 0%)	22%
University of Massachusetts Lowell	Feb 12–18, 2020	400 (LV)	± 7.5%	23%	–	11%	4%	9%	21%	13%	11%	–	4% (Note: "Another candidate" with 4%)	4%
Change Research/The Welcome Party	Feb 12–14, 2020	1015 (LV)	–	23%	–	15%	1%	8%	23%	20%	9%	–	–	1%
East Carolina University	Feb 12–13, 2020	703 (LV)	± 4.3%	28%	6%	8%	1%	7%	20%	14%	7%	–	0%	8%
	Feb 11–12, 2020	New Hampshire primary; Yang withdraws from the race.												
	Feb 3, 2020	Iowa caucus												
Zogby Analytics	Jan 31 – Feb 3, 2020	277 (LV)	± 5.9%	28%	4%	7%	4%	2%	20%	15%	11%	1%	0% (Note: Bennet and Patrick with 0%)	8%
East Carolina University	Jan 31 – Feb 2, 2020	469 (LV)	± 5.3%	37%	1%	4%	2%	2%	14%	19%	8%	3%	0% (Note: Bennet and Patrick with 0%)	10%
Change Research/ Post and Courier	Jan 26–29, 2020	651 (LV)	± 4%	25%	–	7%	3%	2%	20%	18%	11%	3%	1% (Note: Delaney with 1%; Bennet and Patrick with 0%)	10%
	Jan 13, 2020	Booker withdraws from the race												
GQR Research/Unite the Country (Note: The poll's sponsor, Unite the Country, is a pro-Biden super PAC.)	Jan 9–13, 2020	600 (LV)	–	36% (Note: data from 538.com)	– (Note: not released)	5% (Note: data from 538.com)	– (Note: not released)	– (Note: not released)	15% (Note: data from 538.com)	12% (Note: data from 538.com)	10% (Note: data from 538.com)	– (Note: not released)	– (Note: not released)	– (Note: not released)
Fox News	Jan 5–8, 2020	808 (RV)	± 3.5%	36%	2%	4%	1%	1%	14%	15%	10%	2%	3% (Note: Booker with 2%; Bennet, Delaney, Patrick, and Williamson with 0%; "None of the above" with 1%)	11%

Polling before January 2020
Poll source	Date(s) administered	Sample size	Margin of error	Joe Biden	Cory Booker	Pete Buttigieg	Kamala Harris	Beto O'Rourke	Bernie Sanders	Tom Steyer	Elizabeth Warren	Other	Undecided
Change Research/ Post and Courier	Dec 6–11, 2019	392 (LV)	± 4.9%	27%	5%	9%	–	–	20%	5%	19%	13% (Note: Gabbard with 4%; Bloomberg with 3%; Klobuchar and Yang with 2%; Patrick and Williamson with 1%; Bennet, Castro and Delaney with 0%)	–
	Dec 3, 2019	Harris withdraws from the race											
YouGov/FairVote	Nov 22 – Dec 2, 2019	400 (LV)	± 7.5%	39%	2%	10%	2%	–	13%	7%	10%	13% (Note: Gabbard with 4%; Yang with 3%; Bloomberg and Klobuchar with 2%; Delaney and Patrick with 1%; Bennet, Sestak and Williamson with 0%; Bullock and Castro with no voters)	4%
Quinnipiac University	Nov 13–17, 2019	768 (LV)	± 4.8%	33%	2%	6%	3%	–	11%	5%	13%	7% (Note: Yang with 4%; Gabbard, Klobuchar and Williamson with 1%; Bennet, Bullock, Castro, Delaney, Messam, Patrick and Sestak with 0%)	18%
YouGov/CBS News	Nov 6–13, 2019	933 (RV)	± 4.2%	45%	2%	8%	5%	–	15%	2%	17%	6% (Note: Bullock, Delaney, Gabbard, and Klobuchar with 1%; Bennet, Castro, Messam, Sestak, Williamson, and Yang with 0%; someone else with 2%)	–
University of North Florida	Nov 5–13, 2019	426 (LV)	–	36%	2%	3%	4%	–	10%	8%	10%	6% (Note: Bloomberg, Gabbard, Klobuchar, Williamson and Yang with 1%; Bennet, Bullock, Castro, Delaney, Messam and Sestak with 0%; someone else with 1%)	23%
	Nov 1, 2019	O'Rourke withdraws from the race											
Monmouth University	Oct 16–21, 2019	402 (LV)	± 4.9%	33%	2%	3%	6%	1%	12%	4%	16%	7% (Note: Klobuchar and Yang with 2%; Castro, Delaney and Gabbard with 1%; Bennet, Bullock, Ryan, Sestak and Williamson with 0%)	15%
Change Research/ Post and Courier	Oct 15–21, 2019	731 (LV)	± 3.6%	30%	3%	9%	11%	1%	13%	5%	19%	11% (Note: Yang with 4%; Gabbard and Klobuchar with 3%; Bennet with 1%; Bullock, Castro, Delaney, Ryan and Williamson with 0%)	–
Firehouse Strategies/ Øptimus	Oct 8–10, 2019	607 (LV)	± 3.7%	32%	2%	4%	5%	1%	8%	–	16%	33% (Note: Yang with 2%)	– (Note: The poll did not announce this result separately; it is listed as part of 'Other'.)
YouGov/CBS News	Oct 3–11, 2019	915 (RV)	±3.9%	43%	3%	4%	7%	1%	16%	2%	18%	6% (Note: Bennet, Klobuchar, Ryan, Williamson, and Yang with 1%; Bullock, Castro, Delaney, Gabbard, Messam, and Sestak with 0%; "someone else" with 0%)	–
Gravis Marketing	Oct 3–7, 2019	516 (LV)	± 4.3%	34%	6%	0%	4%	2%	10%	7%	9%	10% (Note: Bullock, Klobuchar and Yang with 2%; Castro, Delaney, Gabbard and Williamson with 1%; Bennet and Ryan with 0%)	19%
Fox News	Sep 29 – Oct 2, 2019	803 (LV)	± 3.5%	41%	3%	2%	4%	0%	10%	4%	12%	8% (Note: Bennet, Gabbard, Ryan, Williamson and Yang with 1%; Bullock, Castro, Delaney, Klobuchar, and Messam with < 0.5%; Sestak with 0%; someone else with 3%)	16%
Winthrop University	Sep 21–30, 2019	462 (RV)	± 4.9%	37%	3%	4%	7%	2%	8%	2%	17%	6% (Note: Yang with 2%; Gabbard, Klobuchar, Castro and "Someone else" with 1%; Delaney, Sestak and Bennet with 0%; Bullock, Messam, Ryan and Williamson with less than 0.5%)	12%
CNN/SSRS	Sep 22–26, 2019	406 (LV)	± 5.9%	37%	2%	4%	3%	2%	11%	3%	16%	4% (Note: Bennet, Klobuchar, Gabbard, and Williamson with 1%; Bullock, Castro, Delaney, Gabbard, Ryan, and Yang with 0%)	10%
YouGov/CBS News	Aug 28 – Sep 4, 2019	849 (RV) (Note: poll results among likely voters of this RV sample)	± 4.3%	43%	2%	4%	7%	1%	18%	1%	14%	9% (Note: de Blasio, Bullock, Delaney, Gabbard, Klobuchar, Ryan, and Yang with 1%; Bennet, Castro, Messam, Sestak and Williamson with 0%; someone else with 2%)	–
Change Research	Aug 9–12, 2019	521 (LV)	± 4.3%	36%	4%	5%	12%	1%	16%	1%	17%	7% (Note: Gabbard with 2%; Castro, Delaney, Klobuchar, Ryan, and Yang with 1%; Bennet, Bullock, de Blasio, Gillibrand, Inslee, Messam, and Williamson with 0%)	–
Firehouse Strategies/ Øptimus	Jul 23–25, 2019	554 (LV)	± 3.8%	31%	2%	4%	10%	0%	9%	–	12%	8% (Note: Yang with 1%; "A different Democratic candidate" with 7%)	24%
Monmouth University	Jul 18–22, 2019	405 (LV)	± 4.9%	39%	2%	5%	12%	1%	10%	2%	9%	3% (Note: Bennet and Klobuchar with 1%; Castro, de Blasio, Gabbard, Gillibrand, and Inslee with <1%; Bullock, Delaney, Gravel, Hickenlooper, Messam, Moulton, Ryan, Sestak, Williamson, and Yang with 0%)	17%
YouGov/CBS News	Jul 9–18, 2019	997 (RV) (Note: poll results among likely voters of this RV sample)	± 3.8%	39%	3%	5%	12%	2%	17%	1%	12%	9% (Note: Delaney, Hickenlooper, Inslee, Klobuchar, Ryan, Williamson, and Yang with 1%; Bennet, Bullock, Castro, de Blasio, Gabbard, Gillibrand, Gravel, Messam, Moulton, and Sestak with 0%)	–
Fox News	Jul 7–10, 2019	701 (LV)	± 3.5%	35%	3%	2%	12%	0%	14%	0%	5%	3% (Note: Delaney, Williamson, and Yang with 1%; Bennet, de Blasio, Bullock, Castro, Gabbard, Gillibrand, Hickenlooper, Inslee, Klobuchar, Messam, Moulton, Ryan, and Sestak with 0%)	20%
	Jul 9, 2019	Steyer announces his candidacy											
Change Research	Jun 29 – Jul 4, 2019	421 (LV)	–	27%	6%	6%	21%	1%	16%	0%	15%	8% (Note: Gabbard with 2%; Bennet, Bullock, Castro, Delaney, Hickenlooper, Williamson, and Yang with 1%; Gravel, Inslee, Moulton, Ryan, and Swalwell with 0%)	–
Change Research	Jun 17–20, 2019	308 (LV)	–	39%	5%	11%	9%	5%	13%	0%	15%	5% (Note: Yang with 2%; Bullock, de Blasio, and Ryan with 1%; Castro, Delaney, Gabbard, Gillibrand, Gravel, Hickenlooper, Inslee, Klobuchar, Messam, Moulton, Swalwell, and Williamson with 0%)	–
Change Research	Jun 11–14, 2019	933 (LV)	± 3.2%	37%	5%	11%	9%	4%	9%	–	17%	8% (Note: Yang with 3%; de Blasio, Gabbard, Gillibrand, Klobuchar, and Williamson with 1%; Bennet, Delaney, Gravel, Hickenlooper, Messam, Moulton, Ryan, and Swalwell with 0%)	–
YouGov/CBS News	May 31 – Jun 12, 2019	552 (LV)	–	45%	4%	6%	7%	4%	18%	–	8%	8% (Note: Gillibrand, Gravel, Klobuchar, Messam, and Yang with 1%; Bennet, Bullock, Castro, de Blasio, Delaney, Gabbard, Hickenlooper, Inslee, Moulton, Ryan, Swalwell, and Williamson with 0%; others with 3%)	–
Zogby Analytics	May 23–29, 2019	183 (LV)	± 7.2%	36%	4%	7%	4%	2%	13%	–	12%	4% (Note: Gillibrand with 2%; Castro, Gabbard, Hickenlooper, and Inslee with 1%; Delaney, Klobuchar, and Yang with 0%)	–
Tel Opinion Research*	May 22–24, 2019	600 (LV)	± 4.0%	37%	2%	3%	7%	–	10%	–	8%	–	32%
Crantford Research	May 14–16, 2019	381 (LV)	± 5.0%	42%	4%	8%	10%	–	7%	–	8%	–	–
Change Research	May 6–9, 2019	595 (LV)	± 4.0%	46%	4%	8%	10%	2%	15%	–	8%	5% (Note: Yang with 2%; Abrams, Klobuchar, and Williamson with 1%; Bennet, Castro, Delaney, Gabbard, Gillibrand, Hickenlooper, Inslee, Ryan, and Swalwell with 0%)	–
Firehouse Strategies/ Øptimus	Apr 30 – May 2, 2019	568 (LV)	± 4.5%	48%	4%	5%	4%	1%	12%	–	5%	1% (Note: Klobuchar with 1%)	20%
	Apr 25, 2019	Biden announces his candidacy											
	Apr 14, 2019	Buttigieg announces his candidacy											
Change Research	Mar 31 – Apr 4, 2019	744 (LV)	± 3.6%	32%	9%	7%	10%	9%	14%	–	6%	12% (Note: Abrams with 7%; Castro, Gillibrand, Hickenlooper, Klobuchar, and Yang with 1%; Bennet, Delaney, Gabbard, Inslee, McAuliffe, Swalwell, and Williamson with 0%)	–
Change Research	Mar 31 – Apr 4, 2019	744 (LV)	± 3.6%	–	12%	12%	15%	16%	24%	–	11%	12% (Note: Castro, Gillibrand, Hickenlooper, and Klobuchar with 2%; Delaney, Inslee, Messam, and Yang with 1%; Gabbard and Williamson with 0%)	–
	Mar 14, 2019	O'Rourke announces his candidacy											
Emerson College	Feb 28 – Mar 2, 2019	291 (LV)	± 5.7%	37%	6%	0%	9%	5%	21%	–	5%	16% (Note: Gillibrand with 3%; Bloomberg and Gabbard with 2%: Brown and Klobuchar with 1%; Castro, and Delaney with 0%; others with 8%)	–
Change Research	Feb 15–18, 2019	600 (LV)	± 4.0%	36%	10%	–	13%	8%	14%	–	9%	12% (Note: Brown and Holder with 2%; Bloomberg, Castro, Gabbard, Gillibrand, Hickenlooper, Klobuchar, Swalwell, and Yang with 1%; Bennet, Cuomo, de Blasio, Delaney, McAuliffe, and Williamson with 0%)	–
Change Research	Feb 15–18, 2019	600 (LV)	± 4.0%	–	28%	1%	35%	–	–	–	20%	18% (Note: Klobuchar with 5%; Castro with 4%; Delaney with 3%; Gabbard and Williamson with 2%; Gillibrand and Yang with 1%)	–
	Feb 19, 2019	Sanders announces his candidacy											
	Feb 9, 2019	Warren announces her candidacy											
Firehouse Strategies/ Øptimus	Jan 31 – Feb 2, 2019	557 (LV)	± 4.0%	36%	5%	–	12%	2%	8%	–	4%	2% (Note: Klobuchar with 1%; Gillibrand with 0%)	31%

Head-to-head polling
Poll source	Date(s) administered	Sample size	Margin of error	Joe Biden	Pete Buttigieg	Bernie Sanders	Elizabeth Warren	Other	Undecided
YouGov/FairVote (Note: But for the Biden vs Warren matchup, 'undecided' and 'other' voters are not included in the listed percentages for this poll.)	Nov 22 – Dec 2, 2019	400 (LV)	± 7.5%	73%	27%	–	–	–	–
YouGov/FairVote	Nov 22 – Dec 2, 2019	400 (LV)	± 7.5%	66%	–	34%	–	–	–
YouGov/FairVote	Nov 22 – Dec 2, 2019	400 (LV)	± 7.5%	61%	–	–	29%	(Note: Would not vote with 4%)	6%
YouGov/FairVote	Nov 22 – Dec 2, 2019	400 (LV)	± 7.5%	–	39%	61%	–	–	–
YouGov/FairVote	Nov 22 – Dec 2, 2019	400 (LV)	± 7.5%	–	36%	–	64%	–	–
YouGov/FairVote	Nov 22 – Dec 2, 2019	400 (LV)	± 7.5%	–	–	54%	46%	–	–
Tel Opinion Research	May 22–24, 2019	600	± 4.0%	71%	10%	–	–	–	19%
Tel Opinion Research	May 22–24, 2019	600	± 4.0%	70%	–	15%	–	–	16%
Tel Opinion Research	May 22–24, 2019	600	± 4.0%	67%	–	–	15%	–	18%

== Results ==
Popular vote share by county
Biden—30–40%
Biden—40–50%
Biden—50–60%
Biden—60–70%
Biden—70–80%

Popular vote share by congressional district
Biden—30–40%
Biden—40–50%
Biden—50–60%
Biden—60–70%

Official results show that Joe Biden won the Democratic primary with 48.65% of the vote, with Bernie Sanders coming in second with 19.77%.

2020 South Carolina Democratic presidential primary
Candidate	Votes	%	Delegates
Joe Biden	262,336	48.65	39
Bernie Sanders	106,605	19.77	15
Tom Steyer	61,140	11.34	
Pete Buttigieg	44,217	8.20	
Elizabeth Warren	38,120	7.07	
Amy Klobuchar	16,900	3.13	
Tulsi Gabbard	6,813	1.26	
Andrew Yang (withdrawn)	1,069	0.20	
Michael Bennet (withdrawn)	765	0.14	
Cory Booker (withdrawn)	658	0.12	
John Delaney (withdrawn)	352	0.07	
Deval Patrick (withdrawn)	288	0.05	
Total	539,263	100%	54

=== Results by county ===
Biden won every county.

County	Biden	%	Sanders	%	Steyer	%	Buttigieg	%	Warren	%	Klobuchar	%	Gabbard	%	Others	%	Rejected ballots	Total votes	Turnout of registered electors in %
Abbeville	1,129	57.69	286	14.61	312	15.94	80	4.09	60	3.07	42	2.15	26	1.33	22	1.13	3	1,960	12.54
Aiken	6,769	44.81	3,169	20.98	1,988	13.16	1,246	8.25	1,030	6.82	607	4.02	194	1.28	102	0.67	33	15,138	13.00
Allendale	552	58.29	119	12.57	241	25.45	9	0.95	17	1.80	2	0.21	2	0.21	5	0.53	0	947	16.37
Anderson	5,564	41.83	3,124	23.49	1,808	13.59	988	7.43	984	7.40	524	3.94	230	1.73	80	0.61	16	13,318	11.05
Bamberg	1,099	58.77	277	14.81	387	20.70	26	1.39	43	2.30	19	1.02	4	0.21	15	0.81	6	1,876	19.82
Barnwell	1,068	59.63	274	15.30	308	17.20	32	1.79	49	2.74	26	1.45	13	0.73	21	1.17	2	1,793	13.08
Beaufort	11,275	45.83	3,749	15.24	3,009	12.23	3,067	12.47	1,699	6.91	1,371	5.57	290	1.18	143	0.58	43	24,646	18.81
Berkeley	10,573	49.08	4,598	21.34	2,030	9.42	1,793	8.32	1,495	6.94	527	2.45	383	1.78	143	0.66	31	21,573	16.23
Calhoun	1,118	59.88	288	15.43	302	16.18	47	2.52	42	2.25	34	1.82	25	1.34	11	0.58	5	1,872	17.69
Charleston	28,292	44.30	12,245	19.17	4,734	7.41	8,078	12.65	6,932	10.85	2,302	3.60	1,013	1.59	268	0.42	84	63,948	21.78
Cherokee	1,812	57.14	674	21.22	347	10.94	104	3.28	106	3.34	66	2.08	38	1.20	25	0.79	2	3,173	9.60
Chester	2,033	63.77	633	19.86	223	6.99	102	3.20	88	2.76	58	1.82	23	0.72	28	0.89	6	3,194	15.56
Chesterfield	1,825	64.06	537	18.85	225	7.90	90	3.16	76	2.67	44	1.54	26	0.91	26	0.92	3	2,852	10.93
Clarendon	2,694	68.50	487	12.38	434	11.03	97	2.47	83	2.11	62	1.58	36	0.92	40	1.03	15	3,948	17.14
Colleton	2,318	57.76	679	16.92	64	1.59	73	1.82	174	4.34	526	13.11	174	4.34	26	0.63	5	4,018	16.00
Darlington	4,231	61.11	1,105	15.96	911	13.16	287	4.15	208	3.00	86	1.24	55	0.79	41	0.59	16	6,940	16.03
Dillon	1,485	64.09	362	15.62	319	13.77	39	1.68	39	1.68	38	1.64	8	0.35	27	1.17	9	2,326	12.47
Dorchester	7,657	47.55	3,494	21.70	1,509	9.37	1,457	9.05	1,189	7.38	403	2.50	316	1.96	77	0.48	21	16,123	15.24
Edgefield	1,327	55.87	419	17.64	370	15.58	77	3.24	89	3.75	44	1.85	20	0.84	29	1.21	7	2,382	13.84
Fairfield	2,352	61.09	428	11.12	773	20.08	84	2.18	88	2.29	47	1.22	50	1.30	28	0.73	10	3,860	24.63
Florence	8,676	58.82	2,635	17.86	1,877	12.73	569	3.86	607	4.12	221	1.50	83	0.56	82	0.57	29	14,779	16.76
Georgetown	4,776	52.46	1,574	17.62	1,018	11.39	697	7.80	376	4.21	327	3.66	114	1.28	52	0.59	16	8,950	20.19
Greenville	20,661	38.17	13,376	24.71	5,774	10.67	5,688	10.51	5,207	9.62	2,352	4.35	830	1.53	235	0.43	57	54,180	16.45
Greenwood	2,693	47.88	1,060	18.85	1,091	19.40	278	4.94	241	4.29	165	2.93	57	1.01	39	0.70	7	5,631	13.75
Hampton	1,116	53.09	319	15.18	541	25.74	33	1.57	40	1.90	18	0.86	12	0.57	23	1.10	10	2,112	16.46
Horry	13,281	43.82	6,757	22.29	3,841	12.67	2,877	9.49	1,724	5.69	1,269	4.19	387	1.28	175	0.58	59	30,370	13.02
Jasper	1,794	52.75	543	15.97	573	16.85	189	5.56	122	3.59	110	3.23	42	1.23	28	0.83	5	3,406	16.72
Kershaw	3,577	55.29	1,083	16.74	896	13.85	361	5.58	308	4.76	144	2.23	67	1.04	34	0.54	13	6,483	15.37
Lancaster	4,340	51.48	1,695	20.11	365	4.33	858	10.18	567	6.73	422	5.01	112	1.33	71	0.84	15	8,445	13.43
Laurens	2,413	49.76	1,001	20.64	748	15.43	204	4.21	244	5.03	120	2.47	73	1.51	46	0.95	10	4,859	12.19
Lee	1,876	68.87	332	12.19	364	13.36	49	1.80	53	1.95	11	0.40	18	0.66	21	0.76	7	2,731	23.50
Lexington	9,720	39.87	5,758	23.62	2,827	11.60	2,573	10.55	2,094	8.59	795	3.26	502	2.06	111	0.46	15	24,395	13.00
Marion	2,735	66.87	625	15.28	508	12.42	60	1.47	78	1.91	38	0.93	13	0.32	33	0.81	13	4,103	19.52
Marlboro	1,485	61.44	309	12.78	487	20.15	29	1.20	35	1.45	34	1.41	13	0.54	25	1.04	9	2,426	13.59
McCormick	730	48.18	208	13.73	381	25.15	68	4.49	42	2.77	54	3.56	16	1.06	16	1.06	4	1,519	20.62
Newberry	1,787	55.41	482	14.95	460	14.26	205	6.36	124	3.84	83	2.57	57	1.77	27	0.84	4	3,229	13.66
Oconee	2,181	37.60	1,392	24.00	742	12.79	560	9.66	405	6.98	403	6.95	81	1.40	36	0.61	5	5,805	11.07
Orangeburg	9,089	69.86	1,388	10.67	1,690	12.99	238	1.83	370	2.84	72	0.55	71	0.55	92	0.70	20	13,030	22.91
Pickens	2,513	32.62	2,141	27.79	901	11.70	761	9.88	823	10.68	375	4.87	163	2.12	27	0.35	4	7,708	10.45
Richland	35,869	53.15	11,347	16.81	8,269	12.25	4,491	6.65	5,392	7.99	1,285	1.90	528	0.78	309	0.45	65	67,555	25.71
Saluda	782	54.01	262	18.09	243	16.78	54	3.73	51	3.52	27	1.86	15	1.04	14	0.97	3	1,451	12.52
Spartanburg	9,977	42.31	5,870	24.89	2,911	12.34	1,849	7.84	1,816	7.70	749	3.18	278	1.18	131	0.56	31	23,613	12.45
Sumter	8,375	65.41	1,673	13.07	1,667	13.02	406	3.17	386	3.01	122	0.95	74	0.58	101	0.80	23	12,827	18.34
Union	1,295	57.22	430	19.00	322	14.23	58	2.56	73	3.23	34	1.50	19	0.84	32	1.42	2	2,265	13.72
Williamsburg	3,682	70.08	708	13.48	605	11.52	47	0.89	94	1.79	19	0.36	45	0.86	54	1.04	16	5,270	24.34
York	11,556	43.60	6,551	24.72	1,242	4.69	3,110	11.73	2,307	8.70	1,241	4.68	338	1.28	159	0.60	35	26,539	14.44
Statewide total	262,336	48.65	106,605	19.77	61,140	11.34	44,217	8.20	38,120	7.07	16,900	3.13	6,813	1.26	12,132	2.25	794	540,057	16.38

== Aftermath ==
Joe Biden's overwhelming victory, his first-ever primary win in his three presidential runs, gave his campaign new momentum going into Super Tuesday after lackluster performances in Iowa and New Hampshire and a distant second-place finish in Nevada. The Biden campaign claimed that the outcome proved he had the most diverse coalition of any Democratic candidate, as Iowa's and New Hampshire's Democratic electorates are over 90% white, while South Carolina's Democratic electorate is nearly 60% black. Biden's success in the primary helped him overtake the lead in the then-popular vote from front-runner Bernie Sanders, who came in second.

Despite Pete Buttigieg's initial claims that he would stay in the race following the primary, he suspended his presidential campaign the next day. In his concession speech, Buttigieg claimed he would have a negative effect on the race if he stayed in, which many took as Buttigieg not wanting to split the moderate vote in order to assist Biden. However, while Buttigieg called Biden before making his announcement, he did not immediately endorse him. One day later, on the day before Super Tuesday, Buttigieg publicly endorsed Biden while speaking at Biden's rally in Dallas, Texas.

Elizabeth Warren and Amy Klobuchar both had lackluster performances in South Carolina. However, both candidates stated that they expected the outcome and still had a strong chance of doing well on Super Tuesday. Nonetheless, on March 2, two days after the primary and the day before Super Tuesday, Klobuchar dropped out of the race and endorsed Biden.

Billionaire Tom Steyer, whose campaign was reliant on getting the black vote, dropped out after a lackluster performance in the state. Steyer's campaign had concentrated its advertising efforts on South Carolina, spending more money on television commercials in the state than all the other Democratic candidates combined. Steyer stated in his concession speech that he did not see a path to winning the presidency based on the results.

On February 28, 2020, former Governor of Virginia Terry McAuliffe stated that he would consider endorsing Biden if he performed well in the South Carolina primary. Shortly after it was announced that Biden would win the South Carolina primary, McAuliffe announced his endorsement on CNN. In the following days, Biden received a slew of endorsements, including Virginia Congressman Robert C. Scott, U.S. senator from Illinois Tammy Duckworth (who held the Senate seat once occupied by Barack Obama), former Senate Majority Leader Harry Reid, and former 2020 candidates Pete Buttigieg, Amy Klobuchar, Beto O'Rourke, and Virginia Senator and former 2016 vice presidential nominee Tim Kaine.

== Analysis ==
Participation in the 2020 South Carolina presidential primary was significantly higher than it was in the 2016 presidential primary. Official election results indicate that 539,263 votes were cast. This total represented a marked increase over 2016's 370,904 votes and even a slightly higher amount than 2008's 532,468 votes.

Biden's win was deemed a major victory, as he won all 46 counties in the state. The win was largely attributed to his support from 61% of African-American voters (African-American voters make up approximately 60% of the Democratic electorate in South Carolina). Before the primary on February 26, House Majority Whip and longtime U.S. Representative Jim Clyburn endorsed Biden. Many cited Clyburn's endorsement as a reason for Biden's wide margin of victory, as Clyburn's endorsement was a deciding factor for many African American voters in South Carolina. Thirty-six percent of all primary voters said that they made their decision after Clyburn's endorsement; of that total, 70% voted for Biden. According to FiveThirtyEight, the outcome significantly boosted Biden's chance of winning multiple Super Tuesday states (especially southern states like North Carolina, Texas, and Virginia).

Sanders came in second place in the primary. He received an estimated 14% of the African-American vote, down from 16% in 2016. Sanders did however win the Black youth vote. Even in the Upstate region of the state, which was seen as friendly towards Sanders, Biden won every county, although his margin of victory was smaller in that region than it was in other parts of South Carolina.

Following the South Carolina primary, pollsters and analysts claimed that Buttigieg, Warren, and Klobuchar were losing momentum at a critical time in the race. Exit polls showed that Buttigieg, who won Iowa and did well in New Hampshire, received only 2% of the black vote despite receiving endorsements from many prominent African Americans. Klobuchar and Warren received little support in South Carolina, possibly because of black voters' lack of familiarity with them.

Following their poor performances, Pete Buttigieg, Amy Klobuchar, and Tom Steyer ended their presidential campaigns before Super Tuesday. This meant that moderate voters coalesced instead of splitting their votes between multiple candidates, giving Joe Biden multiple comeback wins on Super Tuesday.
