= 2018 Michigan Proposal 3 =

Proposal 3
- Add Voting Policies to Constitution

Results
Choice	Votes	%
Yes	2,772,301	66.92%
No	1,370,662	33.08%
Total votes	4,142,963	100.00%
Yes
70–80%
60–70%
50–60%
No
50–60%

2018 Michigan Proposal 3 (or just Proposal 3) was a ballot initiative approved by voters in Michigan as part of the 2018 United States elections. The proposal, funded by the ACLU of Michigan, reformed Michigan elections by protecting the right to a secret ballot, ensuring access to ballots for military and overseas voters, adding straight-ticket voting, automatically registering voters, allowing any citizen to vote at any time, provided they have a proof of residency, allowing access to absentee ballots for any reason, and auditing election results. The proposal was overwhelmingly approved with 66.92% of the vote.

== Results ==
Proposal 3
Choice	Votes	%
For	2,772,301	66.92
Against	1,370,662	33.08
Total	4,142,963	100.00

The proposal was passed easily, requiring a simple majority. The proposal passed in all of Michigan's 83 counties except for Montmorency, Missaukee, and Huron.

== Aftermath ==
Prior to Proposal 3's passage, Michigan lacked a period for early voting, save for absentee ballots which fulfilled eligibility requirements. Following Proposal 3's passage, the first major usage of the new law was the 2020 Democratic and Republican presidential primaries, with early voting provided in both. Following the onset of the COVID-19 pandemic in the state in 2020, Michigan implemented a formal early absentee voting period for both the August primaries for state and local offices as well as the presidential election, greatly increasing early voting turnout in both events.

== See also ==
- List of Michigan ballot measures
- 2018 Michigan Proposal 1 – 2018 ballot initiative to legalize Marijuana in Michigan
- 2018 Michigan Proposal 2 – 2018 ballot initiative to establish an independent redistricting commission to redraw legislative districts
