= Post-election lawsuits related to the 2020 U.S. presidential election from Michigan =

The Donald Trump 2020 presidential campaign launched numerous lawsuits contesting the election processes of Michigan. All of these were either dismissed or dropped.

== Summary of post-election lawsuits ==
Michigan post-election lawsuits related to the 2020 United States presidential election
First filing date	Case	Court	Docket no(s).	Outcome	Comments	References
November 4, 2020	Donald J. Trump for President v. Benson	Michigan Court of Appeals	20-000225-MZ	Dismissed	Lawsuit brought by the Trump Campaign that attempted to stop the counting of absentee ballots in Michigan. Dismissed by court of claims.	
November 11, 2020	Donald J. Trump for President v. Benson	U.S. District Court for the Western District of Michigan	1:20-cv-01083	Dropped	Trump lawsuit claiming fraud in the Wayne County election. The suit sought to halt the certification of election results in Wayne County and statewide. Voluntarily dismissed.	
November 4, 2020	Stoddard v. City Election Commission of the City of Detroit	Michigan Third Judicial Circuit Court	20-014604-CZ	Dismissed	A motion for preliminary injunctive relief during the interim was denied by Judge Timothy M Kenny stating that the "...Plaintiffs have made only a claim but have offered no evidence to support their assertions." at the time the motion was filed.	
November 11, 2020	Bally v. Whitmer	U.S. District Court for the Western District of Michigan	1:20-cv-01088	Dropped	Plaintiffs sought to exclude all votes from Wayne, Washtenaw and Ingham Counties from Michigan's certified vote count. Voluntarily dismissed.	
November 9, 2020	Costantino v. Detroit	Michigan Supreme Court	162245	Ruled	Plaintiffs alleged election fraud, seeking to prevent the election results of Detroit and Wayne County from being certified. State trial court denied motion for injunction and issued a dispositive ruling; state court of appeals denied application for leave to appeal and peremptory relief. The state Supreme Court issued a dispositive ruling that the case was moot since the Board had already certified the election results. Dispositive Ruling as moot	
November 30, 2020	Johnson v. Benson	Michigan Supreme Court Lansing, Michigan	162286	Dismissed		
November 16, 2020	Johnson v. Benson	United States District Court for the Western District of Michigan	1:20-cv-01098	Dropped	Voluntarily dismissed.	
November 25, 2020	King v. Whitmer	U.S. District Court for the Eastern District of Michigan	2:20-cv-13134-LVP-RSW	Dismissed	December 7, 2020: Emergency Motion for Declaratory, Emergency, and Permanent Injunctive Relief denied Appealed to the 6th Circuit. Petition to the Supreme Court of the United States for writ of certiorari filed.	
January 20, 2021	Genetski v. Benson	State of Michigan Court of Claims	20-000216-MM	Ruled	March 9, 2021: Absentee ballot application signature verification process implemented by Secretary of State Benson is invalid due to not having gone through the formal rule-making process.	

== Bailey v. Antrim County ==
On November 23, 2020, William Bailey filed a lawsuit against Antrim County in Circuit Court and was represented by Matthew DePerno, who later would run as the Republican nominee for Attorney General. The case was about the election results of a proposed local ordinance in the Village of Central Lake, where a damaged ballot could not be scanned. Judge Kevin Elsenheimer issued a temporary restraining order for a forensic exam of the county's voting machines and allowed Michigan Secretary of State Jocelyn Benson to intervene in the case. Subsequently, DePerno published the forensic exam report by Russ Ramsland, who was a Republican congressional nominee.

On December 14, Michigan's top election officials denounced Ramsland's 23-page report. In a Senate hearing, Chris Krebs testified as Trump's appointed Director of the Cybersecurity and Infrastructure Security Agency and described Ramsland's report as "factually inaccurate". Another Trump-appointee, William Barr called Ramsland's conclusions out as "nonsense".

On May 25, 2021, the Circuit Court dismissed plaintiff's claims as moot because the plaintiff has no right under Michigan law for proposed damages in the matter. Higher courts, including the Michigan Supreme Court, have affirmed the Circuit Court's decision to dismiss. Antrim County also performed a hand recount of every single ballot to verify the county's certified election results.

== Bally v. Whitmer ==
On November 11, 2020, registered voters in Michigan sued state officials, including Governor Gretchen Whitmer, in federal district court. The voters alleged a variety of irregularities, including the exclusion of poll watchers from the canvassing process, and asked that votes from Wayne, Ingham, and Washtenaw Counties not be counted. The complaint cited similar cases Costantino v. Benson and Trump v. Benson. On November 16, the plaintiffs voluntarily dismissed the suit.

== Costantino v. Detroit ==
On November 9, Republican poll challengers filed a lawsuit in Wayne County Circuit Court against Detroit election officials, alleging fraud and misconduct during the vote count at TCF Center and asking for the court to stop the certification of Wayne County results. Chief Judge Timothy M. Kenny denied the petition, finding the "[p]laintiffs’ interpretation of events is incorrect and not credible." The judge stated that the plaintiffs did not fully comprehend the "TCF absent ballot tabulation process" because they failed to attend a familiarization session on October 29. The plaintiffs appealed to the state's court of appeals, which declined to hear the case; on November 23, the Michigan Supreme Court also declined to hear the case.

== Donald J. Trump for President v. Benson (state court) ==
The Trump campaign filed suit in Michigan State Court on November 4 against Michigan Secretary of State Jocelyn Benson, claiming its election observers were not allowed to view the ballot count, as required by Michigan law, and asking the court to stop the counting of votes.

On November 6, Judge Cynthia Stephens denied the request, noting in her ruling that the "essence of the count is completed, and the relief is completely unavailable". The judge also noted the official complaint did not state "why", "when, where, or by whom" an election observer was allegedly blocked from observing ballot-counting in Michigan.

== Donald J. Trump for President v. Benson (federal court) ==
On November 11, 2020, the Trump campaign filed suit in federal district court against Michigan Secretary of State Jocelyn Benson. The campaign asked the court to block Michigan's certification of the vote, repeating allegations found in Constantino v. Detroit. The campaign provided hundreds of pages of affidavits from poll challengers that "described isolated grievances and perceived irregularities, not systemic fraud." On November 19, the Trump campaign voluntarily dismissed the case.

== Johnson v. Benson (federal court) ==
On November 16, 2020, registered voters and poll challengers from Michigan sued Secretary of State Jocelyn Benson in federal district court. The plaintiffs claimed the secretary enabled fraud on election day, and asked to block certification of the vote results until an audit could be performed. On November 18, the plaintiffs voluntarily dismissed the suit.

== Johnson v. Benson (state court) ==
On November 26, 2020, the Amistad Project filed Angelic Johnson, et al. v. Jocelyn Benson, et al. as an extraordinary writ in the Michigan State Supreme Court.

== King v. Whitmer ==
On November 25, 2020, a group of voters filed a lawsuit in the United States District Court Eastern District of Michigan against Gretchen Whitmer, the Governor of Michigan, and other state officials. The plaintiffs alleged a variety of violations of the Election Code and as a remedy, asked the court to decertify the state's election results or certify them for Trump. This was one of the 'Kraken' cases litigated by conservative lawyer Sidney Powell.

On December 7, Judge Linda V. Parker denied the plaintiffs requested relief, saying it "greatly harms the public interest" and that the "ship has sailed." Parker further stated that the plaintiffs only offered "theories, conjecture, and speculation" of potential vote switching. The judge felt that the plaintiffs’ real motive for filing the case was not to win, but to shake "people's faith in the democratic process and their trust in our government."

On December 11, the plaintiffs filed a petition for a writ of certiorari at the Supreme Court of the United States. This petition was denied.

The city and state asked the court for sanctions against the plaintiff's lawyers. The court ordered the plaintiff and their lawyers to be jointly and severely liable for the city and state's legal fees, and ordered that plaintiff's counsel attend legal education courses. The court also ordered a copy of the decision be sent to the disciplinary authority of each lawyer's bar association for investigation and possible suspension or disbarment.

== Stoddard v. City Election Comm'n of the City of Detroit ==
The conservative group Election Integrity Fund filed a lawsuit in the Third Judicial Circuit of Michigan asking for a motion of injunctive relief ordering Detroit election workers to stop "curing" absentee ballots. Chief Judge Timothy Kenny denied the motion for injunctive relief on November 6, finding that the plaintiffs did "not offer any affidavits or specific eyewitness evidence to substantiate their assertions ... Plaintiffs' allegation is mere speculation. Plaintiffs' pleadings do not set forth a cause of action." The judge noted that "sinister, fraudulent motives" were alleged, but that the "plaintiffs' interpretation of events is incorrect and not credible". Following Kenny's ruling, Dana Nessel, Michigan's attorney general, issued a statement saying Michigan has "always been committed to a fair, transparent[,] and secure election that ensures every legal vote is counted".

== See also ==
Michigan prosecution of fake electors
