= Alex Conant =

American political operative

Roger Alexander Conant is an American political operative, communications and media strategist and consultant. He served as communications director for Marco Rubio's 2016 presidential campaign and is a founding partner of Firehouse Strategies, a communications consulting firm.

== Family and education ==
Conant was born in New York City and grew up in Sunfish Lake, Minnesota; he is a son of Ingrid J. Conant and Roger R. Conant. His mother manages two farms in Lime Springs, Iowa, and his father was the chairman and chief investment officer of Magni Asset Management in Minneapolis. Conant graduated from St. Paul Academy and Summit School in Minnesota in 1998 and subsequently obtained a bachelor's degree in economics and a master's degree in public affairs from the University of Wisconsin-Madison. During his time at university, he served as the editor-in-chief of the student daily, The Badger Herald.

== Career ==
=== Early career ===
Conant gained his first experience in the politics while in high school. In 1996, he volunteered for Rudy Boschwitz's Senate campaign and subsequently worked on Norm Coleman's mayoral re-election campaign in 1997 and on his race for governor of Minnesota in 1998. After graduating high school, Conant deferred his university entry to continue working for Coleman's campaign until 1999 and while at university, he worked on Coleman's 2002 U.S. Senate campaign. Following his time at university, in 2005, Conant was press secretary for Senator John Thune of South Dakota and in 2006 he became deputy press secretary for the Office of Management and Budget and then served as a regional White House spokesman for U.S. President George W. Bush.

In 2008, following his time at the White House, Conant served as the national press secretary for the Republican National Committee (RNC). "Campaigns and Elections" commented on his time at the RNC: "If you're a reporter in Washington, you know Alex Conant. As the RNC's national press secretary during the 2008 election, Conant waged an assault on the media's e-mail inboxes—but he did it in a friendly way."

=== Tim Pawlenty 2012 presidential campaign ===
Beginning in 2009, Conant advised Minnesota Governor Tim Pawlenty. He first served as his communications director and subsequently as his national press secretary, during Pawlenty's 2012 presidential campaign.

=== Marco Rubio press secretary ===
In 2011, Conant was hired as a spokesman and advisor to Marco Rubio, for whom he worked for over five years. He first worked as press secretary in Rubio's Senate office before he joined Rubio's presidential campaign. He later served as a senior advisor on Rubio's Senate re-election campaign.

=== Joni Ernst 2014 U.S. Senate campaign ===
In 2014, Conant served as a senior advisor on Joni Ernst's 2014 Iowa senatorial campaign. With his wife, Caitlin, Conant was sent by the National Republican Senatorial Committee to support Ernst towards the end of her campaign. Politico commented "two respected Capitol spokesmen with presidential campaign experience" had been sent to support Ernst and Conant, who was still working for Rubio, stated: "As you know, Marco was an early supporter of Ernst and his team is doing everything we can to help out. It'll be great to have a woman, soldier, and independent leader like her in the Senate."

=== Marco Rubio 2016 presidential campaign ===
In March 2015, Conant moved from Rubio's Senate office to his Political Action Committee (PAC), and in April was officially announced as the presidential campaign's communications director, then senior spokesman. Conant made headlines when in March 2016, CNN cancelled an interview with him after he had criticized the network's report that Rubio was considering dropping out of the race. He also helped Rubio make a strategic turnaround, regarding his position on immigration reforms and later served as communications advisor for Rubio's 2016 U.S. Senate campaign.

=== Firehouse Strategies ===
Conant is a founding partner of the political consulting firm Firehouse Strategies. Firehouse Strategies was launched in June 2016 by Conant, Terry Sullivan, and Will Holley, and specializes in communications strategies.

=== Political commentator, speaker and author ===
Conant has worked on every national election in the past 15 years and makes frequent appearances on television networks Fox News, CNN, MSNBC, and CNBC, to discuss politics and communications. He is a political contributor to CBS News and has written articles for Politico, The Wall Street Journal, and The Weekly Standard. He has been described as "one of the GOP's best-connected operatives in Washington and a familiar face on talk shows".

== Personal life ==
Conant married Caitlin O'Connor Dunn, a communications executive, in 2014. The couple is based in Washington, DC.
