= 2020 Michigan Democratic presidential primary =

- March 10, 2020

147 delegates (125 pledged, 22 unpledged) to the Democratic National Convention The number of pledged delegates won is determined by the popular vote

Candidate	Joe Biden	Bernie Sanders
Home state	Delaware	Vermont
Delegate count	73	52
Popular vote	840,360	576,926
Percentage	52.93%	36.34%

Biden
40–50%
50–60%
60–70%

The 2020 Michigan Democratic presidential primary took place on March 10, 2020, as one of several states voting the week after Super Tuesday in the Democratic Party primaries for the 2020 presidential election. The Michigan primary was an open primary, with the state awarding 147 delegates towards the 2020 Democratic National Convention, of which 125 were pledged delegates allocated on the basis of the results of the primary.

Former vice president Joe Biden decisively won the primary and every county in the state, getting almost 53% of the vote and 73 delegates. Senator Bernie Sanders received around 36% of the vote and 52 delegates, marking a clear regression in support for him from 2016, when he edged out Hillary Clinton by 1.42% and won 73 of the state's 83 counties. Biden's victory was powered by support from African Americans, older voters, working class voters, and moderate voters.

Despite losing every county and almost all municipalities, Sanders was still able to win some of the major cities in the state including: Ann Arbor, Dearborn, Grand Rapids, Lansing and Kalamazoo.

== Procedure ==
Michigan was one of six states (along with Democrats Abroad) which held primaries on March 10, 2020, one week after Super Tuesday. Voting took place throughout the state from 7:00 a.m. until 8:00 p.m. local time. In the open primary, candidates had to meet a threshold of 15 percent at the congressional district or statewide level in order to be considered viable. The 125 pledged delegates to the 2020 Democratic National Convention were allocated proportionally on the basis of the results of the primary. Of these, between 4 and 9 were allocated to each of the state's 14 congressional districts and another 16 were allocated to party leaders and elected officials (PLEO delegates), in addition to 27 at-large delegates. The March primary as part of Stage I on the primary timetable received no bonus delegates, in order to disperse the primaries between more different date clusters and keep too many states from hoarding on a March date.

After district conventions on May 16, 2020, during which district-level delegates were selected, the state central committee meeting subsequently was held on June 13, 2020, to vote on the 27 at-large and 16 pledged PLEO delegates for the Democratic National Convention. The delegation also included 22 unpledged PLEO delegates: 12 members of the Democratic National Committee, 9 members of Congress (both senators and 7 representatives), and the governor Gretchen Whitmer.

Pledged national convention delegates
Type	Del.	Type	Del.
CD1	5	CD8	6
CD2	5	CD9	7
CD3	5	CD10	4
CD4	4	CD11	7
CD5	6	CD12	7
CD6	5	CD13	7
CD7	5	CD14	9
PLEO	27	At-large	16
Total pledged delegates			125

== Candidates ==
The following people have been included on the list issued by the Michigan Secretary of State for the presidential primary.

Running

- Joe Biden
- Tulsi Gabbard
- Bernie Sanders

Withdrawn

- Michael Bennet (Note: Candidate withdrew during absentee voting, following the New Hampshire primary.)
- Michael Bloomberg (Note: Candidate withdrew during absentee voting, following Super Tuesday.)
- Cory Booker
- Pete Buttigieg (Note: Candidate withdrew during absentee voting, before Super Tuesday.)
- Julian Castro
- John Delaney (Note: Candidate withdrew in January, shortly after absentee voting had begun.)
- Amy Klobuchar
- Joe Sestak
- Tom Steyer
- Elizabeth Warren
- Marianne Williamson
- Andrew Yang

There was also an uncommitted option on the ballot.

== Polling ==
Polling aggregation
Source of poll aggregation	Date updated	Dates polled	Joe Biden	Bernie Sanders	Tulsi Gabbard	Other/ Undecided (Note: Calculated by taking the difference of 100% and all other candidates combined)
270 to Win	Mar 10, 2020	Mar 4–9, 2020	57.0%	32.3%	1.3%	9.4%
RealClear Politics	Mar 10, 2020	Mar 4–9, 2020	55.7%	33.3%	1.3%	9.7%
FiveThirtyEight	Mar 10, 2020	until Mar 9, 2020 (Note: FiveThirtyEight aggregates polls with a trendline regression of polls rather than a strict average of recent polls.)	55.3%	31.9%	1.2%	11.6%
Average			56.0%	32.5%	1.3%	10.2%
Michigan primary results (March 10, 2020)			52.9%	36.4%	0.6%	10.1%

Tabulation of individual polls of the 2020 Michigan Democratic primary
Poll source	Date(s) administered	Sample size (Note: Key: A – all adults RV – registered voters LV – likely voters V – unclear)	Margin of error	Joe Biden	Michael Bloomberg	Cory Booker	Pete Buttigieg	Kamala Harris	Amy Klobuchar	Beto O'Rourke	Bernie Sanders	Elizabeth Warren	Andrew Yang	Other	Undecided
Swayable	Mar 9, 2020	3,126 (LV)	± 3.0%	62%	–	–	–	–	–	–	28%	–	–	10% (Note: Gabbard with 1%; "Other" with 9%)	–
AtlasIntel	Mar 7–9, 2020	528 (LV)	± 4.0%	48%	3%	–	–	–	–	–	40%	1%	–	3% (Note: Gabbard with 2%; "Other" with 1%)	5%
Data for Progress	Mar 7–9, 2020	320 (LV)	± 5.5%	59%	–	–	–	–	–	–	38%	–	–	2% (Note: Gabbard with 2%)	–
Mitchell Research & Communications	Mar 8, 2020	602 (LV)	± 4.0%	54%	1%	–	1%	–	1%	–	33%	3%	–	3% (Note: Steyer with 1%; "Someone else" with 2%)	5%
Target Insyght	Mar 8, 2020	600 (LV)	± 4.0%	65%	2%	–	–	–	1%	–	24%	3%	–	3% (Note: Steyer with 0%; "Other" with 1%; "Uncommitted" with 3%)	1%
Concord Public Opinion Partners/ The Welcome Party	Mar 7–8, 2020	305 (LV)	–	54%	–	–	–	–	–	–	23%	–	–	1% (Note: Gabbard with 1%)	22%
YouGov/Yahoo News	Mar 6–8, 2020	–(RV) (Note: Part of a 1,750 registered voter poll of Michigan, Pennsylvania, and Wisconsin)	± 5.8%	54%	–	–	–	–	–	–	42%	–	–	–	–
Monmouth University	Mar 5–8, 2020	411 (LV)	± 4.8%	51%	3%	–	<1%	–	<1%	–	36%	1%	–	7% (Note: Gabbard with 1%; Steyer with 0%; "Uncommitted" with 6%)	2%
ROI Rocket	Mar 4–8, 2020	1,000 (LV)	± 3.1%	55%	–	–	–	–	–	–	45%	–	–	–	–
The Progress Campaign (D)	Mar 3–7, 2020	417 (RV)	± 4.7%	51%	–	–	–	–	–	–	44%	–	–	1%	4% (Note: Listed as "undecided/would not vote")
EPIC-MRA/Detroit Free Press	Mar 4–6, 2020	400 (LV)	± 4.9%	51%	–	–	–	–	–	–	27%	–	–	9% (Note: "Other" with 9%)	13% (Note: "Declined" with 13%)
	Mar 5, 2020	Warren withdraws from the race													
	Mar 4, 2020	Bloomberg withdraws from the race													
	Mar 2, 2020	Klobuchar withdraws from the race													
	Mar 1, 2020	Buttigieg withdraws from the race													
GlenGariff Group Inc./Detroit News/WDIV-TV	Feb 28 – Mar 2, 2020	600 (LV)	± 4.0%	29%	11%	–	6%	–	3%	–	23%	7%	–	6% (Note: Gabbard with 1%; Bennet, Booker, Delaney, Steyer, and Williamson with 0%; Castro and Sestak with no voters; "Refused" with 5%)	16%
	Feb 29, 2020	South Carolina primary; Steyer withdraws from the race after close of polls													
YouGov/University of Wisconsin-Madison	Feb 11–20, 2020	662 (LV)	–	16%	13%	–	11%	–	8%	–	25%	13%	–	–	14% (Note: "Not sure/other" with 14%)
	Feb 11, 2020	New Hampshire primary; Yang withdraws from the race after close of polls													
Baldwin Wallace University/Oakland; University/Ohio Northern University	Jan 8–20, 2020	477 (RV)	–	27%	9.1%	–	6.3%	–	1.9%	–	21.6%	13.6%	3.5%	5.3% (Note: Steyer with 1.7%; Delaney with 1.6%; Bennet with 0.8%; Gabbard with 0.7%; Patrick with 0.5%)	10.6%
	Jan 13, 2020	Booker withdraws from the race													
	Dec 3, 2019	Harris withdraws from the race													
	Nov 24, 2019	Bloomberg announces his candidacy													
Emerson College	Oct 31 – Nov 3, 2019	454	± 4.6%	34%	–	3%	8%	3%	0%	–	28%	19%	2%	3% (Note: Gabbard with 1%; Bennet, Bullock, Castro, Delaney, Sestak, and Williamson with 0%; Someone else with 2%)	–
	Nov 1, 2019	O'Rourke withdraws from the race													
Siena Research/New York Times	Oct 13–26, 2019	203	–	30%	–	0%	3%	0%	1%	0%	17%	21%	1%	1% (Note: Gabbard with 1%; others with 0%)	23%
Kaiser Family Foundation	Sep 23 – Oct 15, 2019	208 (LV)	–	19%	–	1%	7%	2%	1%	1%	15%	25%	1%	0% (Note: Castro and Steyer with no voters; someone else with 0%)	27%
Denno Research	Sep 21–24, 2019	217	–	27%	–	1%	4%	4%	1%	1%	12%	23%	1%	4% (Note: Bennet with 2%; Gabbard, Delaney with 1%; Bullock, Castro, Messam, Ryan, Sestak, Steyer and Williamson with 0%)	23% (Note: Labelled as "Other/unsure")
Climate Nexus	Jul 14–17, 2019	324 (LV)	–	35%	–	2%	4%	8%	1%	1%	16%	14%	1%	2% (Note: Gabbard and Steyer with 1%; Bennet, de Blasio, Bullock, Castro, Delaney, Gillibrand, Gravel, Hickenlooper, Inslee, Messam, Moulton, Ryan, Sestak and Williamson with 0%)	13% (Note: Labelled as "Other/unsure")
Zogby Analytics	May 23–29, 2019	268	± 6.0%	27%	–	1%	9%	7%	1%	4%	18%	8%	2%	5% (Note: Castro, Delaney, Gabbard, Gillibrand, and Hickenlooper with 1%; Inslee with 0%)	–
Denno Research	May 8–10, 2019	235	–	37%	–	3%	5%	4%	1%	1%	16%	9%	0%	4% (Note: Bennet, Gabbard, Gillibrand, and Swalwell with 1%; Castro, Delaney, Gravel, Hickenlooper, Inslee, Messam, Moulton, Ryan, Williamson, and Yang with 0%)	23%
	Apr 25, 2019	Biden announces his candidacy													
	Apr 14, 2019	Buttigieg announces his candidacy													
	Mar 14, 2019	O'Rourke announces his candidacy													
Emerson College	Mar 7–10, 2019	317	± 5.5%	40%	–	3%	0%	12%	5%	2%	23%	11%	–	4% (Note: Gillibrand and Hickenlooper with 1%; Castro, Gabbard, and Inslee with 0%; others with 3%)	–

== Results ==
Results by county Biden—40–50% Biden—50–60% Biden—60–70%

2020 Michigan Democratic presidential primary
Candidate	Votes	%	Delegates
Joe Biden	840,360	52.93	73
Bernie Sanders	576,926	36.34	52
Michael Bloomberg (withdrawn)	73,464	4.63	
Elizabeth Warren (withdrawn)	26,148	1.65	
Pete Buttigieg (withdrawn)	22,462	1.41	
Amy Klobuchar (withdrawn)	11,018	0.69	
Tulsi Gabbard	9,461	0.60	
Andrew Yang (withdrawn)	2,380	0.15	
Tom Steyer (withdrawn)	1,732	0.11	
Michael Bennet (withdrawn)	1,536	0.10	
Cory Booker (withdrawn)	840	0.05	
Joe Sestak (withdrawn)	757	0.05	
Marianne Williamson (withdrawn)	719	0.05	
John Delaney (withdrawn)	464	0.03	
Julian Castro (withdrawn)	306	0.02	
Uncommitted	19,106	1.20	
Total	1,587,679	100%	125

== See also ==
- 2020 Michigan Republican presidential primary

== Notes ==
Additional candidates
