= Terry Sullivan (political consultant) =

American political consultant

- Education: University of North Carolina Wilmington
- Occupation: Political consultant
- Political party: Republican

Terry Sullivan is an American political consultant. Best known as the campaign manager for Marco Rubio's 2016 presidential campaign, Sullivan is a founding partner of the consulting firm Firehouse Strategies.

== Early life and education ==
Sullivan attended the University of North Carolina at Greensboro from 1992 to 1995. He then served as youth coordinator for North Carolina Senator Jesse Helms during his successful 1996 Senate bid, before graduating with a bachelor's degree from the University of North Carolina at Wilmington in 1997.

== Career ==
Sullivan was Campaign Manager for Jim DeMint's Senate campaign from May 2003 to December 2004. He was credited with helping DeMint secure his seat in the first run.

In 2006, he was regional political director for the National Republican Senatorial Committee. From 2006 to 2011, he worked as the managing partner at First Tuesday Strategies, a political and grassroots consulting firm based in South Carolina. In that position, he helped various Republican officials in their successful campaigns, including four new Members of Congress and six U.S. Senators.

He served as senior adviser to Senator Kay Bailey Hutchison's U.S. Senate campaign in 2006 and later as senior adviser to her 2010 gubernatorial campaign in Texas.

During the 2008 election cycle, Sullivan then served as Mitt Romney's campaign manager for the South Carolina primary.

In 2010, Sullivan was the lead strategist for Congressman Trey Gowdy’s victory over incumbent congressman Bob Inglis in the primary. That year he also advised Marco Rubio's 2010 Senate campaign and in 2011 was hired by Rubio as his deputy chief of staff. He served in this position until December 2012, when he founded and ran Reclaim America, Rubio's leadership PAC. During the 2012 election cycle the PAC raised $1.8 million and during the cycle of 2014, $3.9 million.

=== Marco Rubio presidential campaign, 2016 ===
In 2016, Sullivan served as Campaign Manager on Senator Rubio’s presidential campaign, coordinating a budget of over $50 million with more than a hundred staffers around the country.

=== Firehouse Strategies ===
Sullivan is a founding partner of the public affairs firm Firehouse Strategies, which he launched with two former Rubio staffers, Alex Conant and Will Holley, in June 2016.

The New York Times reported that the company was launched under the premise “that Mr. Trump has rewritten the rules of modern communications strategy, and candidates and corporations need to take heed.”

== Further affiliations and memberships ==
Throughout his career, Sullivan has launched several successful communications and media firms and played a senior strategic role in over 100 campaigns, including more than two dozen US Senate, Gubernatorial and Presidential campaigns.

He was also a featured speaker at different universities, including Harvard and NYU and has appeared as an expert on major cable networks, as well as in news publications ranging from The New York Times to National Review.

Sullivan serves on the board of ClearPath, a conservative clean energy advocacy group.

He also serves as adjunct professor at George Washington University's Graduate School of Political Management.

== Personal life ==
Sullivan lives in Washington, D.C. together with his teenage daughter McKenna. In his off-time he enjoys mountaineering expeditions and long-distance offshore boating trips.
