= Firehouse Strategies =

American public relations consulting firm

Firehouse Strategies is a public relations consulting firm headquartered in Washington, DC. It was founded in 2016 by Republican strategists Terry Sullivan, Alex Conant, and Will Holley, who served on Senator Marco Rubio's 2016 presidential campaign.

Firehouse has led public affairs campaigns for Fortune 10 companies, trade associations, and nonprofits. Firehouse has conducted polls and surveys regarding the 2018 midterm elections, and 2020 campaigns.

Firehouse Strategies had 15 employees in May 2019. In 2019, the firm was nominated as Boutique Agency of the Year by the Holmes Report.
