= Change Research =

American polling firm

- Formation: July 2017; 9 years ago
- Founders: Mike Greenfield; Pat Reilly
- Type: Public benefit corporation
- Location: San Francisco Bay Area, California
- Services: Polling
- CEO: Mike Greenfield
- Chief Growth Officer: Pat Reilly
- National Political Director: Kris M. Balderston
- Website: www.changeresearch.com

Change Research is a polling firm based in the San Francisco Bay Area. It was first incorporated as a public benefit corporation in July 2017 by Mike Greenfield, a former data scientist at PayPal and LinkedIn, and Pat Reilly, a former Democratic Party campaign operative. Unlike many other pollsters, Change Research conducts all of its polls online. It claims to offer accurate and inexpensive online polling. Its clients have included Democratic political candidates such as Lauren Underwood, who won a race in Illinois's 14th congressional district in 2018, and Dan Osborn, the independent politician from Nebraska as well as organizations such as the NAACP and AFL–CIO. In 2021, FiveThirtyEight ranked Change Research a "B−" for its historical accuracy and polling methodology and noted that it called 75% of races correctly.
