= 2020 Pennsylvania elections =

- November 3, 2020
- Registered: 9,090,962
- Turnout: 76.1%

Elections were held in Pennsylvania on November 3, 2020. On that date, the state held elections for President of the United States, U.S. House of Representatives, Pennsylvania State Senate, Pennsylvania House of Representatives, and various others.

The office of the Pennsylvania Secretary of the Commonwealth oversaw the election process, including voting and vote counting. To vote by mail, registered Pennsylvania voters had to request a ballot by October 27, 2020. By early October, 2,568,084 voters requested mail ballots.

== Election law changes for 2020 ==
On October 29, 2019, the Pennsylvania House of Representatives passed Act 77 by a vote of 138–61. Later that day, the Pennsylvania State Senate passed Act 77 by a vote of 35–14. Governor Tom Wolf signed Act 77 into law two days later. The law enacted numerous changes to Pennsylvania's election code. Voters were allowed to request a mail-in ballot without providing a reason. A person could register to vote up to 15 days before an election and vote in that election, instead of the previous 30-day period. It said that mail-in ballots and absentee ballots would be valid if received by 8 p.m. on election day. The law eliminated the option of pushing one button to vote for all candidates of the same party, called straight-ticket voting; instead, a voter would need to select each candidate in order to vote the same way. The law said the state would cover up to 60 percent of the cost for counties to replace their voting machines with systems that had voter-verifiable paper. Governor Wolf described the changes as the "most significant improvement to Pennsylvania’s elections in more than 80 years".

In response to the COVID-19 pandemic, the Pennsylvania House of Representatives and the Pennsylvania State Senate both unanimously passed Act 12 on March 25, 2020, and Gov. Wolf signed it into law two days later. Act 12 delayed the primary election from April 28 to June 2. Act 12 also allowed counties to begin counting ballots at 7 a.m. on election day rather than being required to wait until 8 p.m. to do so.

== Federal offices ==
=== President and Vice President of the United States ===
Pennsylvania had 20 electoral votes in the Electoral College. Incumbent Republican Donald Trump won the state in 2016 with 48.2% of the vote.

2020 United States presidential election in Pennsylvania
| Party | Candidate | Votes | % |
|---|---|---|---|
| Democratic | Joe Biden | 3,458,229 | 50.01 |
| Republican | Donald Trump (incumbent) | 3,377,674 | 48.84 |
| Libertarian | Jo Jorgensen | 79,380 | 1.15 |
| Total votes | | 6,915,283 | 100.00 |
| Democratic win | | | |

=== United States House of Representatives ===
Voters in Pennsylvania elected 18 candidates to serve in the U.S. House, one from each of the 18 congressional districts.

| District | Democratic nominee | Republican nominee | Libertarian nominee | Independent candidates |
|---|---|---|---|---|
| District 1 | Christina Finello | Brian Fitzpatrick, incumbent | Steve Scheetz (write-in) | |
| District 2 | Brendan Boyle, incumbent | David Torres | | |
| District 3 | Dwight Evans, incumbent | Michael Harvey | | |
| District 4 | Madeleine Dean, incumbent | Kathy Bernette | | Joe Tarshish (write-in) |
| District 5 | Mary Gay Scanlon, incumbent | Dasha Pruett | | |
| District 6 | Chrissy Houlahan, incumbent | John Emmons | | John H. McHugh (write-in) |
| District 7 | Susan Wild, incumbent | Lisa Scheller | | Anthony Sayegh (write-in) |
| District 8 | Matt Cartwright, incumbent | Jim Bognet | | |
| District 9 | Gary Wegman | Dan Meuser, incumbent | | |
| District 10 | Eugene DePasquale | Scott Perry, incumbent | | |
| District 11 | Sarah Hammond | Lloyd Smucker, incumbent | | |
| District 12 | Lee Griffin | Fred Keller, incumbent | Elizabeth Terwilliger (write-in) | |
| District 13 | Todd Rowley | John Joyce, incumbent | | |
| District 14 | William Marx | Guy Reschenthaler, incumbent | | |
| District 15 | Robert Williams; Ronnie Ray Jenkins (write-in) | Glenn Thompson, incumbent | | |
| District 16 | Kristy Gnibus | Mike Kelly, incumbent | | |
| District 17 | Conor Lamb, incumbent | Sean Parnell | | |
| District 18 | Michael Doyle, incumbent | Luke Negron | | Donald Nevills (write-in); Daniel Vayda (write-in) |

== State offices ==
=== Executive offices ===
Three executive offices were up for election in Pennsylvania's general election: auditor general, attorney general, and treasurer.

==== Attorney general ====
Incumbent Democratic attorney general Josh Shapiro ran for re-election to a second term. He was first elected in 2016 with 51.4% of the vote.

2020 Pennsylvania Attorney General election
| Party | Candidate | Votes | % |
|---|---|---|---|
| Democratic | Josh Shapiro (incumbent) | 3,461,472 | 50.85 |
| Republican | Heather Heidelbaugh | 3,153,831 | 46.33 |
| Libertarian | Daniel Wassmer | 120,489 | 1.77 |
| Green | Richard Weiss | 70,804 | 1.04 |
| Total votes | | 6,806,596 | 100.00 |
| Democratic hold | | | |

==== Treasurer ====
Incumbent Democratic treasurer Joe Torsella ran for re-election to a second term. He was first elected in 2016 with 50.7% of the vote. He lost re-election to businesswoman and retired U.S. Army Colonel Stacy Garrity.

2020 Pennsylvania State Treasurer election
| Party | Candidate | Votes | % |
|---|---|---|---|
| Republican | Stacy Garrity | 3,291,877 | 48.68 |
| Democratic | Joe Torsella (incumbent) | 3,239,331 | 47.91 |
| Libertarian | Joseph Soloski | 148,614 | 2.20 |
| Green | Timothy Runkle | 81,984 | 1.21 |
| Total votes | | 6,761,806 | 100.00 |
| Republican gain from Democratic | | | |

==== Auditor General ====
Incumbent Democratic Auditor General Eugene DePasquale was term-limited and ineligible to seek a third consecutive term. He was re-elected in 2016 with 50.0% of the vote. Dauphin County controller Timothy DeFoor won the election against former Philadelphia deputy mayor Nina Ahmad.

2020 Pennsylvania Auditor General election
| Party | Candidate | Votes | % |
|---|---|---|---|
| Republican | Timothy DeFoor | 3,338,009 | 49.44 |
| Democratic | Nina Ahmad | 3,129,131 | 46.35 |
| Libertarian | Jennifer Moore | 205,929 | 3.05 |
| Green | Olivia Faison | 78,588 | 1.16 |
| Total votes | | 6,751,657 | 100.00 |
| Republican gain from Democratic | | | |

=== Pennsylvania Senate ===
25 of 50 seats (odd-numbered districts) in the Pennsylvania Senate were up for election in Pennsylvania's general election.

==== Special elections ====
A special election was also held on January 14 in the 48th senatorial district after the resignation of Republican senator Mike Folmer.

=== Pennsylvania House of Representatives ===
All 203 seats in the Pennsylvania House of Representatives were up for election in the general election.

==== Special elections ====
Special elections were held for the 8th, 18th, 58th, and 190th districts prior to the general election.

== Pennsylvania ballot measures ==
There were no statewide ballot measures up for election in this general election; however, there were local ballot measures in Pittsburgh and Philadelphia.

== See also ==
- Postal voting in the United States, 2020
- Elections in Pennsylvania
- Electoral reform in Pennsylvania
- Bilingual elections requirement for Pennsylvania (per Voting Rights Act Amendments of 2006)
- Political party strength in Pennsylvania
- Politics of Pennsylvania
