= 2020 Pennsylvania Auditor General election =

- November 3, 2020
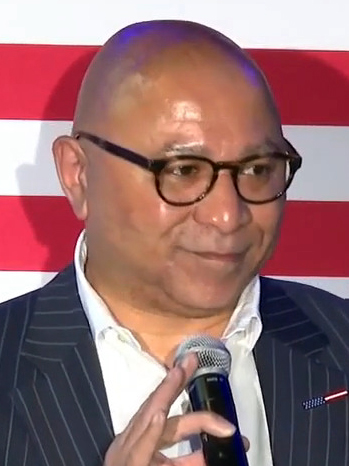

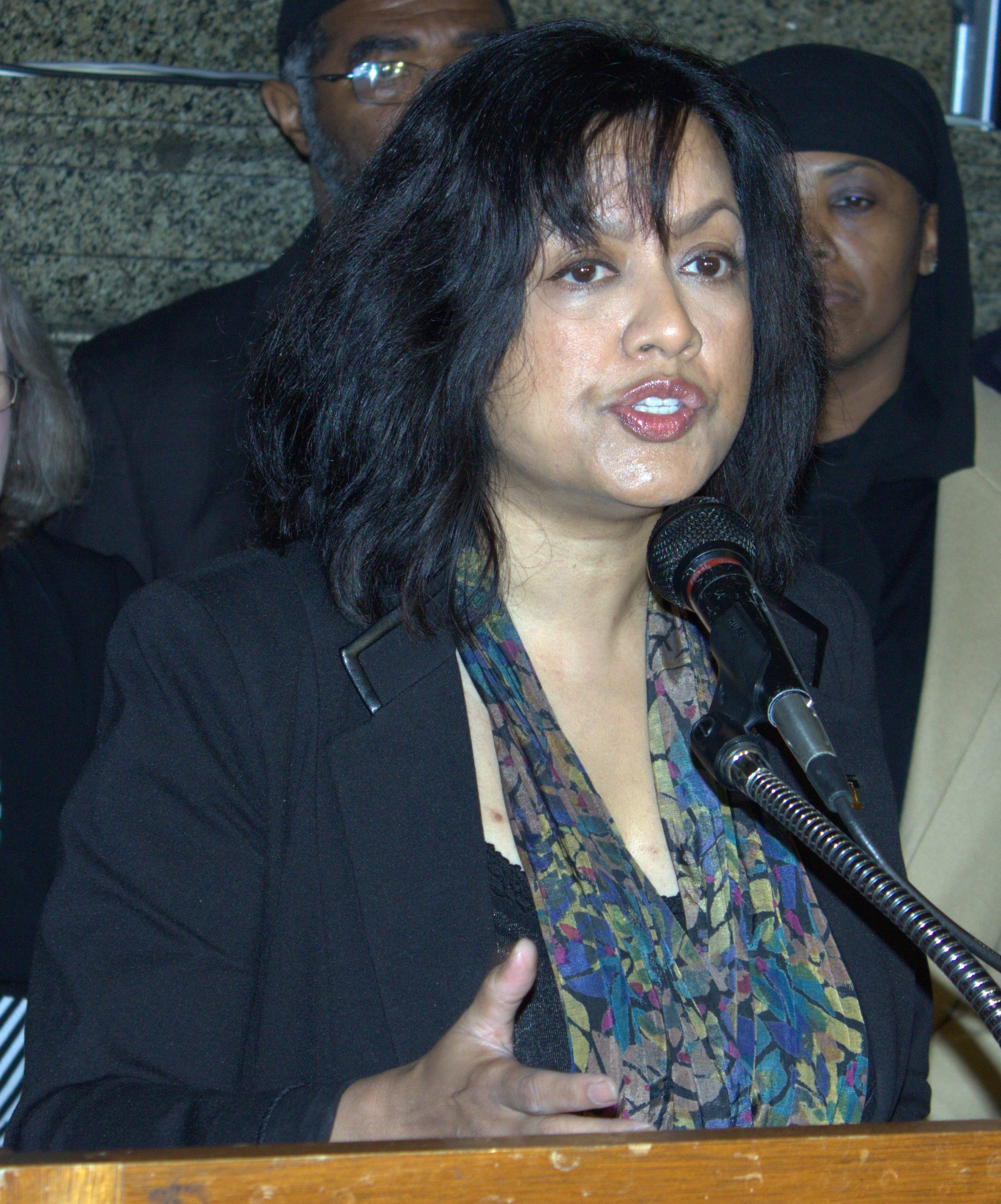
Nominee	Timothy DeFoor	Nina Ahmad
Party	Republican	Democratic
Popular vote	3,338,009	3,129,131
Percentage	49.44%	46.35%
- DeFoor: 40–50% 50–60% 60–70% 70–80% 80–90% >90% Ahmad: 40–50% 50–60% 60–70% 70–80% 80–90% >90% Tie: 40–50% No data
Auditor General before election
Eugene DePasquale
Democratic
Elected Auditor General
Timothy DeFoor
Republican

The Pennsylvania Auditor General election of 2020 took place on November 3, 2020. Primary elections were originally due to take place on April 28, 2020. However, following concerns regarding the coronavirus pandemic the primaries were delayed until June 2, 2020. Under the Pennsylvania Constitution incumbent Democratic Auditor General Eugene DePasquale was ineligible to seek a third consecutive term.

The Democratic Party nominated Nina Ahmad, a Bangladeshi American, while the Republicans nominated Timothy DeFoor, an African American, meaning that the victor would be the first person of color to be elected to statewide executive office in Pennsylvania. (Note: Tim Reese, who is African American, was the first person of color to hold statewide executive office when he served as Pennsylvania Treasurer from 2015 to 2017, but was appointed to the position by Governor Tom Wolf following the resignation of Rob McCord.)

On November 6, the Associated Press declared Timothy DeFoor the winner. DeFoor became the first Republican to win the office of Auditor General in 28 years, the first African American and person of color to win election to statewide office in Pennsylvania, and became the second African American to hold statewide office in Pennsylvania upon taking office.

== Background ==
Historically, the Democratic Party has controlled the Auditor General's office in the modern era. Between 1960 and 2016, the Democratic nominee for Auditor General has prevailed in all but two elections. The last Republican to serve as Auditor General was Barbara Hafer, who was elected in 1988 and 1992.

Between 2000 and 2016, the nominee of the Democratic Party ran unopposed in their party's primary. However, between October 2019 and January 2020, six candidates entered the Democratic primary, becoming the largest primary field since 1996, when Bob Casey Jr. defeated three other candidates to advance to the general election.

In contrast to similar offices in other states, the Pennsylvania Auditor General's office is seen as a potential stepping stone to higher office. Bob Casey Sr. and Bob Casey Jr. held the office prior to becoming governor and U.S. Senator, respectively, and auditors general Donald A. Bailey and Jack Wagner attempted gubernatorial campaigns during or after their tenure. Hafer was the Republican nominee for governor in 1990, while still serving as auditor general. Outgoing auditor general Eugene DePasquale was also seen as having successfully used the office to raise his profile in the state, and was seen as a potential candidate for governor or U.S. Senate in 2022 prior to announcing he would run for Pennsylvania's 10th congressional district.

In 2019, the Pennsylvania General Assembly voted to reduce the budget of the auditor general's office by 10%. The cuts were seen by observers as a response to DePasquale's political activity.

=== Impact of COVID-19 ===
Following the outbreak of the COVID-19 pandemic, on March 25 the Pennsylvania General Assembly voted to delay the state's primary elections from April 28 to June 2. The same act of legislation which delayed the primary also permitted counties to temporarily consolidate polling places for the primary election. In October 2019, prior to the pandemic, Governor Tom Wolf signed into law an election reform bill which allowed for postal voting. In April, it was announced that Pennsylvania residents would be able to request a postal ballot over the internet, with an application deadline of May 26.

The government encouraged postal voting in order to combat the spread of COVID-19 and maintain social distancing. Postal ballots were originally due to be received by election officials by 8 p.m. EDT on June 2. However, on June 1, Governor Wolf signed an executive order extending the deadline to June 9 for six counties, provided the ballots in question were postmarked no later than June 2. The counties impacted by the executive order were Philadelphia, Allegheny, Erie, Dauphin, Montgomery, and Delaware. In issuing the executive order, Governor Wolf's office cited both the pandemic and the ongoing protests in response to the murder of George Floyd as motivation for the extension. On June 2, a judge granted Bucks County a postal ballot extension, bringing the total number of counties granted an extension to seven.

== Democratic primary ==
=== Candidates ===
==== Nominee ====
- Nina Ahmad, former deputy mayor of Philadelphia and candidate for Lieutenant Governor in 2018

==== Defeated in primary ====
- Scott Conklin, state representative from the 77th district since 2007 and Democratic nominee for Lieutenant Governor in 2010
- Rose Davis, certified public accountant and vice chairman of the Smithfield Township Board of Auditors
- Tracie Fountain, certified public accountant and former employee of the Auditor General's office
- Christina Hartman, former nonprofit executive and Democratic nominee for Pennsylvania's 16th congressional district in 2016
- Michael Lamb, Pittsburgh city controller since 2008

==== Withdrew ====
- Alan Butkovitz, former Philadelphia city controller (2006–2018) and former state representative (1991–2005)

=== Endorsements ===
Nina Ahmad

State legislators

- Arthur L. Haywood III, state senator for the 4th district
- Movita Johnson-Harrell, former member of the Pennsylvania House of Representatives for the 190th district
- Stephen Kinsey, member of the Pennsylvania House of Representatives for the 201st district
- Jared Solomon, member of the Pennsylvania House of Representatives for the 202nd district
- Danilo Burgos, member of the Pennsylvania House of Representatives for the 197th district

Local officials

- Cindy Bass, member of the Philadelphia City Council
- Rochelle Bilal, Philadelphia Sheriff
- Helen Gym, Member of the Philadelphia City Council

Organizations

- AAPI Victory Fund

Newspapers and other media

- Philadelphia Tribune
Scott Conklin

State legislators

- Patrick J. Harkins, member of the Pennsylvania House of Representatives for the 1st District
- Robert Merski, member of the Pennsylvania House of Representatives for the 2nd District

Local

- Mark Higgins, commissioner of Centre County, Pennsylvania
- Michael Pipe, commissioner of Centre County, Pennsylvania

Organizations

- International Brotherhood of Teamsters Local 8
Tracie Fountain

Organizations

- Emerge America
Christina Hartman

State executives

- Ed Rendell, former governor of Pennsylvania (2003–2011)

State legislators

- Mike Sturla, member of the Pennsylvania House of Representatives from the 96th district (1991–present)
- Mary Jo Daley, member of the Pennsylvania House of Representatives from the 148th district (2013–present)
- Joe Ciresi, member of the Pennsylvania House of Representatives from the 146th district (2019–present)
- Tim Seip, former member of the Pennsylvania House of Representatives from the 125th district (2007–2010)

County officials

- D. Bruce Hanes, Montgomery County Register of Wills

Organizations

- Lancaster County Democratic Committee
- Chester County Democratic Committee
- Chester County Young Democrats
- Montgomery County Democratic Committee
- Middletown Democratic Party
Michael Lamb

U.S. representatives

- Mike Doyle, congressman from PA-18 (2019-present, 1995–2003) and PA-14 (2003–2019)
- Conor Lamb, congressman for PA-17 (2019–present) and PA-18 (2018–2019)

State legislators

- Jay Costa, minority leader of the Pennsylvania State Senate (2011–present) and state senator for the 43rd district (1996–present)
- Austin Davis, member of the Pennsylvania House of Representatives for the 35th district (2018–present)
- Dan Deasy, member of the Pennsylvania House of Representatives for the 27th district (2009–present)
- Anthony M. DeLuca, member of the Pennsylvania House of Representatives for the 32nd district (1983–)
- Frank Dermody, minority leader of the Pennsylvania House of Representatives (2011–) and member for the 33rd district (1991–present)
- Wayne D. Fontana, state senator for the 42nd district (2005–present)
- William C. Kortz, member of the Pennsylvania House of Representatives for the 37th district (2007–present)
- Dan Miller, member of the Pennsylvania House of Representatives for the 42nd district (2013–present)
- Harry Readshaw, member of the Pennsylvania House of Representatives for the 36th district (1995–present)
- Michael Driscoll, member of the Pennsylvania House of Representatives for the 173rd district (2015–present)

County officials

- Rich Fitzgerald, Allegheny County Executive (2012–present)
- Stephen Zappala, District Attorney of Allegheny County (1998–present)

Local officials

- Jim Kenney, Mayor of Philadelphia since 2016
- Jonathan Saidel, former Philadelphia City Controller (1990–2006)

Organizations

- Philadelphia City Democratic Committee
- Laborers District Council of Western Pennsylvania
- Plumbers Union Local 27
- Pittsburgh Fire Fighters IAFF Local 1
- Fraternal Order of Police Fort Pitt Lodge No. 1

=== Campaign ===
Christina Hartman became the first Democrat to officially enter the field in October 2019. She was joined later in that month by Nina Ahmad. Tracie Fountain, a longtime employee of the auditor general's office, resigned in order to mount a campaign. By January, the size of the field had swelled to seven candidates when Alan Butkovitz, the former Philadelphia City Controller, announced he was entering the race on January 23. Just eleven days later, however, Butkovitz withdrew from the race citing an intent to help Democrats win Pennsylvania in the 2020 United States presidential election.

Hartman received the endorsement of former Pennsylvania Governor Ed Rendell in December 2019. In January, Pittsburgh Controller Michael Lamb secured the endorsement of Philadelphia Mayor Jim Kenney, which Lamb later touted in an advertisement in the closing days of the campaign.

Both Lamb and Ahmad sought to portray themselves as progressives. Ahmad pledged to use the auditor general's office to tackle issues such as gun violence and cited healthcare and prescription drug costs as "a big concern". Following the onset of the COVID-19 pandemic, Ahmad also called for a pandemic preparedness audit. Lamb was described as "a vocal critic of Wall Street," and stated that his first action would be to conduct an audit of the auditor general's office itself in the name of increased transparency. Lamb also supported legalizing recreational marijuana in Pennsylvania, and highlighted his track record as Pittsburgh's top auditor.

Tracie Fountain and Scott Conklin highlighted the department's budget cuts in discussing their plans for the office. Fountain's campaign focused on optimizing the work of the auditor general's office in the face of those cuts, while Conklin called for programs to support independent farms and small businesses. Rose Davis highlighted her more than three decades of experience conducting audits and stated her priority would be to audit third-party contractors, particularly in the field of eldercare. Hartman expressed a desire to focus on criminal justice and school spending. Each of the candidates promised greater oversight of COVID-19 relief spending.

On March 28 and March 29, 2020, virtual meetings conducted over the Zoom teleconferencing service with Ahmad, Davis, and Fountain (all women of color) were targeted by hackers who deployed racial epithets. As of May 29, Ahmad and Lamb reportedly had the highest spending on television advertising, while Conklin, Fountain, and Hartman had no television spending. Similarly, according to reports filed with the Pennsylvania Department of State in 2020, Ahmad led the field in campaign contributions with around $428,000, followed by Lamb with approximately $158,000. Rose Davis reported the lowest value of contributions, with only around $5,000 in total receipts. Ahmad, Lamb, and Conklin were also believed to have the highest name recognition in the race. On May 30, Hartman attended a demonstration in Lancaster to protest the murder of George Floyd.

=== Results ===
Results by county Ahmad: 20–30%; 30–40%; 50–60%; 60–70%; 70–80%; Lamb: 20–30%; 30–40%; 40–50%; 50–60%; 60–70%; 70–80%; Hartman: 20–30%; 30–40%; 40–50%; 70–80%; Fountain: 20–30%; 30–40%; 60–70%; Conklin: 20–30%; 30–40%; 40–50%; 50–60%; 60–70%; 70–80%; Davis: 20–30%; 30–40%; 40–50%; 70–80%; Tie: 20–30%

As results came in on election night, Michael Lamb appeared to be in the lead. However, as a result of the implementation of postal voting and extensions granted to seven counties the race was deemed too early to call. A majority of outstanding votes were from the southeastern portion of the state, where Nina Ahmad was expected to be strongest. Ahmad pulled ahead of Lamb in the days following the election and by June 8 was perceived as the likely victor, but the race remained too close to call. Nina Ahmad claimed victory on June 11 and Michael Lamb conceded the race.

Democratic primary results
Party	Candidate	Votes	%
Democratic	Nina Ahmad	551,144	36.44%
Democratic	Michael Lamb	410,556	27.14%
Democratic	Christina Hartman	211,281	13.97%
Democratic	Tracie Fountain	136,130	9.00%
Democratic	Scott Conklin	112,952	7.47%
Democratic	Rose Davis	90,558	5.99%
Total votes		1,512,621	100.0%

== Republican primary ==
=== Candidates ===
==== Nominee ====
- Timothy DeFoor, Dauphin County controller

==== Withdrew ====
- Cris Dush, state representative from the 66th district since 2015 (running for State Senate)
- Dennis Stuckey, former Lancaster County commissioner

==== Declined ====
- Mike Tobash, state representative from the 125th district

=== Endorsements ===
Timothy DeFoor

Organizations

- Republican State Committee of Pennsylvania

=== Campaign ===
Lancaster County Commissioner Dennis Stuckey, whose term expired in 2020, became the first Republican to enter the primary in November 2019. Stuckey highlighted his record as a county official and his past experience in accounting and finance. Dauphin County Controller Timothy DeFoor became the second Republican to join the field in December, followed by Cris Dush, a state legislator from Jefferson County, in January 2020. However, later in January the Republican State Committee of Pennsylvania voted to officially endorse DeFoor for the position with 199 votes, compared to 96 for Stuckey and 11 for Dush. Stuckey had previously indicated that he would not mount a campaign without party support, and subsequently withdrew from the race on January 30. On February 13, 2020, Dush withdrew from the race in order to seek a seat in the Pennsylvania State Senate, leaving DeFoor the presumptive nominee.

=== Results ===
Republican primary results
Party	Candidate	Votes	%
Republican	Timothy DeFoor	Unopposed	
Total votes		1,042,092	100.0%

== General election ==
=== Polling ===
Poll source	Date(s) administered	Sample size (Note: Key: A – all adults RV – registered voters LV – likely voters V – unclear)	Margin of error	Nina Ahmad (D)	Timothy Defoor (R)	Other	Undecided
Civiqs/Daily Kos	October 23–26, 2020	1,145 (LV)	± 3%	48%	41%	5% (Note: Moore (L) with 3%; Faison (G) with 2%)	6%
Monmouth University	September 28 – October 4, 2020	500 (RV)	± 4.4%	46%	40%	3% (Note: Faison (G), Moore (L) and "No one" with 1%)	12%
Monmouth University	September 28 – October 4, 2020	500 (LV)	± 4.4%	46% (Note: With a likely voter turnout model featuring high turnout)	42%	–	–
Monmouth University	September 28 – October 4, 2020	500 (LV)	± 4.4%	45% (Note: With a likely voter turnout model featuring low turnout)	44%	–	–
CPEC	September 15–17	830 (LV)	± 2.3%	21%	20%	1%	59%
Monmouth University	August 28–31, 2020	400 (RV)	± 4.9%	43%	41%	4% (Note: Moore (L) with 2%; Faison (G) and "No one" with 1%)	12%
Monmouth University	August 28–31, 2020	400 (LV)	± 4.9%	45% (Note: With a likely voter turnout model featuring higher turnout than in the 2016 presidential election)	42%	3%	11%
Monmouth University	August 28–31, 2020	400 (LV)	± 4.9%	45% (Note: With a likely voter turnout model featuring lower turnout than in the 2016 presidential election)	42%	2%	12%

=== Endorsements ===
Nina Ahmad

U.S. presidents

- Barack Obama, 44th president of the United States

U.S. vice presidents

- Joe Biden, 47th vice president of the United States, 2020 Democratic nominee for president

U.S. senators

- Kamala Harris, U.S. senator from California; 2020 vice presidential nominee

U.S. representatives

- Brendan Boyle, Member of the U.S. House of Representatives from Pennsylvania's 2nd congressional district (2019–present) and PA-13 (2015–2019)

State legislators

- Arthur L. Haywood III, State Senator for the 4th district
- Movita Johnson-Harrell, former Member of the Pennsylvania House of Representatives for the 190th district
- Stephen Kinsey, Member of the Pennsylvania House of Representatives for the 201st district
- Jared Solomon, Member of the Pennsylvania House of Representatives for the 202nd district
- Katie Muth, State Senator for the 44th district

Local officials

- Cindy Bass, Member of the Philadelphia City Council
- Rochelle Bilal, Philadelphia Sheriff
- Helen Gym, Member of the Philadelphia City Council
- Maria Quiñones-Sanchez, member of the Philadelphia City Council

Individuals

- Andrew Yang, entrepreneur, non-profit leader and 2020 Democratic candidate for President

Organizations

- AAPI Victory Fund
- Humanity Forward
- Philadelphia Council AFL–CIO

Newspapers and other media

- The Philadelphia Inquirer
- Philadelphia Tribune
Timothy DeFoor

U.S. representatives

- Glenn Thompson, Member of the U.S. House of Representatives from Pennsylvania's 15th congressional district (2019–present), Pennsylvania's 5th congressional district (2009–2019)

Organizations

- Pennsylvania National Federation of Independent Business
- Republican State Committee of Pennsylvania

Newspapers and other media

- The Citizens' Voice
- Harrisburg 100

=== Results ===
Pennsylvania Auditor General election, 2020
Party	Candidate	Votes	%	±%
Republican	Timothy DeFoor	3,338,009	49.44%	+4.36%
Democratic	Nina Ahmad	3,129,131	46.35%	−3.66%
Libertarian	Jennifer Moore	205,929	3.05%	+0.82%
Green	Olivia Faison	78,588	1.16%	−1.53%
Total votes		6,751,657	100.0%	
Republican gain from Democratic				

==== By county ====
County	Timothy DeFoor Republican		Nina Ahmad Democratic		Various candidates Other parties	
County	#	%	#	%	#	%
Adams	37,076	66.74%	15,859	28.55%	2,619	4.72%
Allegheny	275,870	39.17%	397,204	56.40%	31,133	4.43%
Armstrong	26,089	72.85%	8,231	22.99%	1,490	4.16%
Beaver	52,045	55.97%	36,281	39.02%	4,658	5.01%
Bedford	22,524	83.06%	3,801	14.02%	792	2.92%
Berks	107,553	53.44%	83,972	41.73%	9,722	4.83%
Blair	44,847	71.41%	15,256	24.29%	2,697	4.30%
Bradford	20,846	71.18%	6,867	23.45%	1,575	5.38%
Bucks	193,628	49.73%	181,946	46.73%	13,788	3.54%
Butler	72,957	65.80%	33,274	30.01%	4,654	4.20%
Cambria	45,886	66.07%	20,683	29.78%	2,885	4.15%
Cameron	1,701	71.26%	525	21.99%	161	6.74%
Carbon	20,785	63.27%	10,575	32.19%	1,493	4.55%
Centre	37,846	49.62%	34,946	45.81%	3,486	4.57%
Chester	141,525	45.45%	158,220	50.81%	11,638	3.74%
Clarion	14,136	73.54%	4,247	22.09%	840	4.37%
Clearfield	28,243	72.74%	8,753	22.54%	1,832	4.72%
Clinton	11,491	66.20%	5,127	29.54%	740	4.26%
Columbia	19,163	62.91%	9,707	31.87%	1,590	5.22%
Crawford	27,670	67.24%	11,587	28.16%	1,895	4.60%
Cumberland	80,146	57.38%	53,297	38.16%	6,233	4.47%
Dauphin	69,050	47.90%	68,399	47.45%	6,701	4.65%
Delaware	126,216	39.21%	183,869	57.12%	11,842	3.68%
Elk	11,611	69.79%	4,248	25.53%	777	4.67%
Erie	64,430	48.67%	60,388	45.62%	7,564	5.71%
Fayette	37,724	62.65%	20,428	33.92%	2,066	3.43%
Forest	1,819	70.07%	652	25.12%	125	4.81%
Franklin	56,420	71.23%	19,228	24.28%	3,556	4.49%
Fulton	6,605	85.00%	938	12.07%	228	2.93%
Greene	11,220	65.94%	4,975	29.24%	821	4.83%
Huntingdon	16,740	74.86%	4,687	20.96%	935	4.18%
Indiana	26,918	66.43%	11,843	29.23%	1,762	4.35%
Jefferson	17,584	78.10%	3,970	17.63%	961	4.27%
Juniata	9,275	78.66%	2,047	17.36%	470	3.98%
Lackawanna	47,376	42.59%	58,857	52.91%	4,998	4.50%
Lancaster	162,741	59.15%	101,116	36.75%	11,289	4.10%
Lawrence	27,383	60.95%	15,439	34.36%	2,107	4.69%
Lebanon	46,258	65.92%	20,815	29.66%	3,095	4.41%
Lehigh	83,303	46.15%	88,859	49.23%	8,347	4.63%
Luzerne	79,084	53.42%	62,485	42.20%	6,484	4.38%
Lycoming	40,537	69.10%	15,618	26.62%	2,512	4.28%
McKean	13,789	72.27%	4,360	22.85%	931	4.88%
Mercer	35,045	61.82%	19,090	33.68%	2,550	4.50%
Mifflin	16,122	76.71%	4,036	19.20%	858	4.08%
Monroe	36,738	45.41%	40,257	49.76%	3,915	4.84%
Montgomery	195,435	38.97%	284,952	56.82%	21,109	4.21%
Montour	5,783	60.24%	3,375	35.16%	442	4.60%
Northampton	80,874	49.13%	76,792	46.65%	6,949	4.22%
Northumberland	27,580	66.63%	11,713	28.30%	2,100	5.08%
Perry	18,089	74.59%	5,073	20.92%	1,090	4.49%
Philadelphia	122,995	17.53%	555,316	79.15%	23,287	3.32%
Pike	18,821	58.94%	11,803	36.96%	1,309	4.10%
Potter	7,092	79.95%	1,441	16.25%	337	3.80%
Schuylkill	45,733	66.02%	19,894	28.72%	3,644	5.26%
Snyder	13,637	72.95%	4,226	22.61%	827	4.44%
Somerset	30,680	76.65%	7,783	19.45%	1,562	3.90%
Sullivan	2,467	70.47%	867	24.76%	167	4.77%
Susquehanna	14,765	69.34%	5,574	26.18%	954	4.48%
Tioga	15,445	74.89%	4,158	20.16%	1,020	4.94%
Union	12,369	62.45%	6,662	33.63%	776	3.92%
Venango	18,070	69.25%	6,552	25.11%	1,472	5.64%
Warren	13,645	67.97%	5,307	26.44%	1,122	5.59%
Washington	69,587	59.77%	42,029	36.10%	4,817	4.14%
Wayne	17,929	65.48%	8,228	30.05%	1,222	4.46%
Westmoreland	125,237	62.15%	68,478	33.98%	7,797	3.87%
Wyoming	9,653	66.49%	4,167	28.70%	698	4.81%
York	146,108	62.20%	77,779	33.11%	10,998	4.68%
Totals	3,338,009	49.44%	3,129,131	46.35%	284,517	4.21%

Counties that flipped from Democratic to Republican

- Beaver (largest city: Beaver)
- Centre (largest municipality: State College)
- Dauphin (largest municipality: Harrisburg)
- Erie (largest municipality: Erie)
- Luzerne (largest municipality: Wilkes-Barre)

Counties that flipped from Republican to Democratic

- Chester (largest municipality: West Chester)

==== By congressional district ====
DeFoor won 11 of 18 congressional districts, including two that elected Democrats.

District	Ahmad	DeFoor	Representative
1st	47%	49%	Brian Fitzpatrick
2nd	69%	28%	Brendan Boyle
3rd	88%	9%	Dwight Evans
4th	56%	40%	Madeleine Dean
5th	60%	37%	Mary Gay Scanlon
6th	51%	45%	Chrissy Houlahan
7th	48%	47%	Susan Wild
8th	46%	49%	Matt Cartwright
9th	32%	63%	Dan Meuser
10th	42%	53%	Scott Perry
11th	34%	62%	Lloyd Smucker
12th	28%	67%	Fred Keller
13th	24%	71%	John Joyce
14th	35%	61%	Guy Reschenthaler
15th	26%	70%	Glenn Thompson
16th	37%	58%	Mike Kelly
17th	47%	48%	Conor Lamb
18th	62%	34%	Mike Doyle
