= 2020 United States presidential election in Pennsylvania =

- November 3, 2020
- Turnout: 76.5% (▲5.2 pp)

Nominee	Joe Biden	Donald Trump
Party	Democratic	Republican
Home state	Delaware	Florida
Running mate	Kamala Harris	Mike Pence
Electoral vote	20	0
Popular vote	3,458,229	3,377,674
Percentage	50.01%	48.84%

Biden
40–50%
50–60%
60–70%
70–80%
80–90%
90–100%
Trump
40–50%
50–60%
60–70%
70–80%
80–90%
90–100%
Tie/No Votes
President before election
Donald Trump
Republican
Elected President
Joe Biden
Democratic

The 2020 United States presidential election in Pennsylvania was held on Tuesday, November 3, 2020, as part of the 2020 United States presidential election in which all 50 states plus the District of Columbia participated. Pennsylvania voters chose electors to represent them in the Electoral College via a popular vote, pitting the Republican Party's nominee, President Donald Trump, and running mate Vice President Mike Pence against Democratic Party nominee, former Vice President Joe Biden, and his running mate California Senator Kamala Harris. Pennsylvania had 20 electoral votes in the Electoral College.

Although Trump had won the state in 2016 by a narrow margin of 0.72%, Biden was able to reclaim the state, winning it by a similarly narrow 1.17% margin. Because of the way the state counted in-person ballots first, Trump started with a wide lead on election night. However, over the next few days, Biden greatly closed the margin due to outstanding votes from Democratic-leaning areas, most notably Philadelphia and Pittsburgh, as well as mail-in ballots from all parts of the state which strongly favored him. On the morning of November 6, election-calling organization Decision Desk HQ forecast that Biden had won Pennsylvania's 20 electoral votes, and with them the election. The following morning, November 7, at the same time that the Trump campaign was holding a press conference outside of a Philadelphia landscaping business, nearly all major news organizations followed suit and called Pennsylvania for Biden, proclaiming him president-elect.

One key to Biden's success in the state was his improvement on Hillary Clinton's margins in the large Philadelphia-area suburban counties: he won Bucks by 3.60% more than Clinton did, Delaware by 4.38% more, Montgomery by 4.80% more, and Chester—which Mitt Romney had narrowly won just eight years prior—by 6.60% more. At the same time, he reclaimed two of the three large industrial counties which had voted Democratic for at least six consecutive elections before Trump flipped them in 2016: Erie and Northampton. While Trump prevailed in the third, Luzerne County, he did so by a reduced margin with respect to 2016; and Biden increased the margin of victory in his birth county, Lackawanna County, which Trump had nearly flipped in 2016. Biden halted the four-election Democratic slide in formerly traditionally Democratic Westmoreland County, where, before 2020, Al Gore had been the last Democrat to improve on the previous nominee's vote share (and which had given Trump his margin in the state in 2016). He also improved on Clinton's margins in Lehigh County by 2.9% and won Allegheny County with the largest percentage of the vote since 1988; however, Biden's vote share in Philadelphia County actually declined slightly compared to Clinton's, although he still outperformed either Al Gore in 2000 or John Kerry in 2004 in the county. Biden became the first Democratic candidate running for president to garner at least 100,000 votes in the Republican stronghold county of Lancaster. He also became the second presidential candidate since 1964, the last time the county voted for a Democrat, to get at least 40% of the vote. This was due to the large number of votes Biden received from the city of Lancaster and a competitive margin in voting precincts in and around Lititz and Columbia.

Despite Biden's victory, Pennsylvania weighed in for this election as 3.3% more Republican than the national average. Biden's 1.2% margin of victory is the smallest of any Democratic nominee who won Pennsylvania. This was the second consecutive presidential election in which Pennsylvania voted to the right of the nation. Previously, it had not done so since 1948.

With Ohio, Florida, and Iowa backing the losing candidate for the first time since 1960, 1992, and 2000 respectively, this election established Pennsylvania, Wisconsin, and Michigan as the states with the longest bellwether streak still in effect today. The last time any of them voted against the winning candidate was 2004, when all three voted for the losing Democrat John Kerry. Biden became the first Democrat to win the White House without carrying Luzerne County since Harry Truman in 1948. This was the first election since 1932 that the county voted for the statewide loser.

== Primary elections ==
The primary elections were originally scheduled for April 28, 2020, also originally joining several northeastern states in holding primaries on the same date, including Connecticut, Delaware, Maryland, New York, and Rhode Island. On March 26, Pennsylvania joined several other states in moving its primary to June 2 due to the COVID-19 pandemic.

=== Republican primary ===
Even though the Republican National Committee mailed Pennsylvania voters encouraging mail-in voting, describing it as a "convenient and secure" option, most Republicans expressed opposition to the prospect. Earlier, the Republican-controlled House blocked a proposal to mail every Pennsylvanian a mail-in ballot application. This was in response to President Trump's skepticism of the practice, expressing concern mail-in voting may result in voter fraud that would potentially benefit the Democratic Party.

2020 Pennsylvania Republican presidential primary
Candidate	Votes	%	Delegates
Donald Trump	1,053,616	92.1%	34
Bill Weld	69,427	6.1%	0
Rocky De La Fuente	20,456	1.8%	0
Total	1,143,499	100%	34

Trump was declared the winner in the Republican primary, and received all of the state's 34 pledged delegates to the 2020 Republican National Convention (the state also has 54 unpledged delegates).

=== Democratic primary ===
2020 Pennsylvania Democratic presidential primary
Candidate	Votes	%	Delegates
Joe Biden	1,264,624	79.26	151
Bernie Sanders (withdrawn)	287,834	18.04	35
Tulsi Gabbard (withdrawn)	43,050	2.70	
Total	1,595,508	100%	186

=== Green Caucus ===
The Green Caucus was held during April 2020 and was won by Howie Hawkins.

== General election ==
=== Predictions ===
Source	Ranking
The Cook Political Report	Lean D (flip)
Inside Elections	Lean D (flip)
Sabato's Crystal Ball	Lean D (flip)
Politico	Lean D (flip)
RCP	Tossup
Niskanen	Likely D (flip)
CNN	Lean D (flip)
The Economist	Likely D (flip)
CBS News	Lean D (flip)
270towin	Lean D (flip)
ABC News	Lean D (flip)
NPR	Lean D (flip)
NBC News	Lean D (flip)
538	Likely D (flip)

=== Polling ===
==== Graphical summary ====
View source data.

==== Aggregate polls ====
Source of poll aggregation	Dates administered	Dates updated	Joe Biden Democratic	Donald Trump Republican	Other/ Undecided (Note: Calculated by taking the difference of 100% and all other candidates combined.)	Margin
270 to Win	October 22 – November 2, 2020	November 3, 2020	49.4%	45.7%	4.9%	Biden +3.7
Real Clear Politics	October 29 – November 2, 2020	November 3, 2020	48.7%	47.5%	3.8%	Biden +1.2
FiveThirtyEight	until November 2, 2020	November 3, 2020	50.2%	45.6%	4.2%	Biden +4.6
Average			49.4%	46.3%	4.3%	Biden +3.1

==== 2020 polls ====
Poll source	Date(s) administered	Sample size (Note: Key: A – all adults RV – registered voters LV – likely voters V – unclear)	Margin of error	Donald Trump Republican	Joe Biden Democratic	Jo Jorgensen Libertarian	Howie Hawkins Green	Other	Undecided
Susquehanna Polling & Research Inc.	Nov 1–2	499 (LV)	± 4.3%	49% (Note: With voters who lean towards a given candidate)	48%	1%	-	0% (Note: Would not vote with 0%)	0%
SurveyMonkey/Axios	Oct 20 – Nov 2	6,045 (LV)	± 2%	47% (Note: Overlapping sample with the previous SurveyMonkey/Axios poll, but more information available regarding sample size)	52%	-	-	–	–
Pulse Opinion Research/Rasmussen Reports	Oct 31 – Nov 1	800 (LV)	± 3.5%	47%	50%	-	-	1% (Note: "Some other candidate" with 1%)	–
Research Co.	Oct 31 – Nov 1	450 (LV)	± 4.6%	46%	52%	-	-	2% (Note: "Someone else" with 2%)	4%
AYTM/Aspiration	Oct 30 – Nov 1	340 (LV)	–	49%	51%	-	-	–	–
Change Research/CNBC	Oct 29 – Nov 1	699 (LV)	± 3.71%	46%	50%	2%	-	–	2%
Marist College/NBC	Oct 29 – Nov 1	772 (LV)	± 4.4%	46%	51%	-	-	1%	2%
Monmouth University	Oct 28 – Nov 1	502(RV)	± 4.4%	45%	50%	1%	-	0% (Note: "Other candidate" and "No one" with 0%)	4%
Monmouth University	Oct 28 – Nov 1	502 (LV)	± 4.4%	44% (Note: With a likely voter turnout model featuring high turnout)	51%	-	-	–	–
Monmouth University	Oct 28 – Nov 1	502 (LV)	± 4.4%	45% (Note: With a likely voter turnout model featuring low turnout)	50%	-	-	–	–
Swayable	Oct 27 – Nov 1	1,107 (LV)	± 3.9%	48%	50%	2%	-	–	–
Data for Progress	Oct 27 – Nov 1	1,417 (LV)	± 2.6%	45%	52%	2%	0%	0% (Note: "Other candidate or write-in" with 0%)	–
Ipsos/Reuters	Oct 27 – Nov 1	673 (LV)	± 4.3%	45% (Note: Standard VI response)	51%	1%	1%	2% (Note: West (B) with 2%; "Some other candidate" and would not vote with 0%)	–
Ipsos/Reuters	Oct 27 – Nov 1	673 (LV)	± 4.3%	44% (Note: If only Biden, Trump and "some other candidate" were available)	51%	-	-	3% (Note: "Some other candidate" with 3%; would not vote with 0%)	2%
Ipsos/Reuters	Oct 27 – Nov 1	673 (LV)	± 4.3%	46% (Note: Results considering those who lean towards a given candidate among those initially predisposed towards abstention, indecision or a candidate besides Biden or Trump in the response section immediately above)	52%	-	-	2% (Note: "Some other candidate" with 2%)	–
Trafalgar	Oct 30–31	1,062 (LV)	± 2.93%	48%	46%	2%	-	1% (Note: "Someone else" with 1%)	4%
Frederick Polls/Compete Everywhere (Note: Compete Everywhere primarily supports Democratic candidates)	Oct 30–31	879 (LV)	± 3%	48%	52%	-	-	–	–
Insider Advantage/Center for American Greatness (Note: The Center for American Greatness is a pro-Trump organization)	Oct 30–31	500 (LV)	± 4.4%	48.7%	47.4%	1.3%	-	–	2.6%
Siena College/NYT Upshot	Oct 26–31	1,862 (LV)	± 2.4%	43%	49%	2%	-	0% (Note: "Someone else" and would not vote with 0%)	5% (Note: Includes "Refused")
Morning Consult	Oct 22–31	2,686 (LV)	± 2%	43%	52%	-	-	–	–
Emerson College	Oct 29–30	823 (LV)	± 3.3%	47%	52%	-	-	2%	–
AtlasIntel	Oct 29–30	672 (LV)	± 4%	50%	49%	-	-	2%	–
Targoz Market Research/PollSmart	Oct 25–30	998 (LV)	–	42%	56%	-	-	2% (Note: "Not sure/Someone else/Undecided" with 2%)	–
Public Policy Polling/American Bridge PAC (Note: Climate Power 2020 was created by the League of Conservation Voters, which endorsed Biden prior to the sampling period)	Oct 28–29	1,012 (V)	–	45%	52%	-	-	–	3%
Redfield & Wilton Strategies	Oct 26–29	2,125 (LV)	–	45%	50%	1%	-	1%	3%
Harvard-Harris/The Hill	Oct 26–29	901 (LV)	–	46%	51%	-	-	–	3%
ABC/Washington Post	Oct 24–29	824 (LV)	± 4%	44%	51%	3%	-	0% (Note: "None of these" and "Other" with 0%; would not vote with no voters)	1%
Muhlenberg College/Morning Call	Oct 23–28	419 (LV)	± 5.5%	44%	49%	-	-	4% (Note: "Neither/other" with 4%)	2%
SurveyMonkey/Axios	Oct 1–28	10,599 (LV)	± 1.5%	46%	52%	-	-	–	-
RMG Research/PoliticalIQ	Oct 25–27	800 (LV)	± 3.5%	45%	51%	-	-	2%	2%
RMG Research/PoliticalIQ	Oct 25–27	800 (LV)	± 3.5%	44% (Note: Results generated with high Democratic turnout model)	52%	-	-	2%	2%
RMG Research/PoliticalIQ	Oct 25–27	800 (LV)	± 3.5%	47% (Note: Results generated with high Republican turnout model)	49%	-	-	2%	2%
Quinnipiac University	Oct 23–27	1,324 (LV)	± 2.7%	44%	51%	-	-	1%	4%
Swayable	Oct 23–26	491 (LV)	± 6%	46%	52%	2%	-	–	–
Civiqs/Daily Kos	Oct 23–26	1,145 (LV)	± 3%	45%	52%	-	-	2%	1%
Ipsos/Reuters	Oct 20–26	655 (LV)	± 4.4%	44%	51%	3%	0%	1% (Note: "Some other candidate" with 1%; West (B) and would not vote with 0%)	–
Ipsos/Reuters	Oct 20–26	655 (LV)	± 4.4%	45%	50%	-	-	3%	2%
Insider Advantage/Center for American Greatness	Oct 25	400 (LV)	± 4.9%	48.5%	45.5%	3.3%	-	–	2.8%
Trafalgar Group	Oct 24–25	1,076 (LV)	± 2.91%	48%	48%	2%	-	1%	1%
Wick Surveys	Oct 24–25	1,000 (LV)	± 3.1%	49%	47%	-	-	–	–
Franklin & Marshall College	Oct 19–25	558 (LV)	± 5%	44%	50%	2%	-	1% (Note: "Refused" with 1%; "Some other candidate" with 0%)	3%
Univision/University of Houston/Latino; Decisions/North Star Opinion Research	Oct 17–25	723 (RV)	± 3.64%	45%	50%	-	-	3% (Note: "Someone else" with 3%)	2%
Gravis Marketing	Oct 23	602 (LV)	± 4%	44%	51%	-	-	–	5%
Public Policy Polling/American Bridge PAC (Note: The American Bridge PAC exclusively supports Democratic candidates)	Oct 21–22	980 (V)	–	46%	51%	-	-	–	4%
Civiqs/Dan Hopkins	Oct 17–21	1,577 (A)	3%	46%	52%	-	-	–	2%
YouGov/University of Wisconsin-Madison	Oct 13–21	669 (LV)	± 4.45%	44%	52%	-	-	3% (Note: Includes Undecided)	–
Citizen Data	Oct 17–20	1,000 (LV)	± 3.1%	39%	44%	9%	0%	1%	7%
CNN/SSRS	Oct 15–20	843 (LV)	± 4%	43%	53%	2%	-	1% (Note: "Other" with 1%; "None of these" with 0%)	1%
Muhlenberg College/Morning Call	Oct 13–20	416 (LV)	± 5.5%	44%	51%	-	-	2% (Note: "Neither/other" with 2%)	4%
Morning Consult	Oct 11–20	2,563 (LV)	± 1.9%	43%	52%	-	-	–	–
Fox News	Oct 18–19	1,045 (LV)	± 3%	45%	50%	1%	-	1% (Note: "Other" with 1%; would not vote with no voters)	2%
Pulse Opinion Research/Rasmussen Reports	Oct 18–19	800 (LV)	± 3.5%	47%	50%	-	-	2%	3%
Quinnipiac University	Oct 16–19	1,241 (LV)	± 2.8%	43%	51%	-	-	1%	5%
Change Research/CNBC	Oct 16–19	574 (LV) (Note: Additional data sourced from FiveThirtyEight)	–	47%	49%	-	-	–	–
Suffolk University/USA Today	Oct 15–19	500 (LV)	± 4.4%	42%	49%	1%	-	4% (Note: "Refused" with 3%; "Others" with 1%)	4%
Ipsos/Reuters	Oct 13–19	653 (LV)	± 4.4%	45%	49%	2%	0%	3% (Note: "Some other candidate" with 2%; West (B) with 1%; would not vote with 0%)	–
Ipsos/Reuters	Oct 13–19	653 (LV)	± 4.4%	45%	49%	-	-	3%	4%
Trafalgar Group/Restoration PAC (Note: The Restoration PAC is a 501 non-profit which supports Donald Trump's 2020 presidential campaign)	Oct 13–15	1,041 (LV)	± 2.96%	46%	48%	3%	-	2%	2%
HarrisX/The Hill	Oct 12–15	1,289 (LV)	–	46%	51%	-	-	–	–
Insider Advantage/Center for American Greatness	Oct 12–13	400 (LV)	± 4.9%	43%	46%	2%	-	–	9%
Redfield & Wilton Strategies	Oct 10–13	1,289 (LV)	–	43%	51%	1%	0%	–	–
Trafalgar Group	Oct 10–12	1,034 (LV)	± 2.97%	45%	47%	3%	-	3%	2%
RMG Research/PoliticalIQ	Oct 7–12	800 (LV)	–	43%	49%	1%	–	1%	6%
RMG Research/PoliticalIQ	Oct 7–12	800 (LV)	–	42%	50%	1%	–	1%	6%
RMG Research/PoliticalIQ	Oct 7–12	800 (LV)	–	45%	47%	1%	–	1%	6%
Civiqs/Rust Belt Rising (Note: Rust Belt Rising is affiliated with the Democratic Party)	Oct 8–11	600 (LV)	± 4.2%	45%	52%	-	-	2%	1%
Ipsos/Reuters	Oct 6–11	622 (LV)	± 4.5%	45%	51%	1%	0%	2% (Note: "Some other candidate" and would not vote with 1%; West (B) with 0%)	–
Ipsos/Reuters	Oct 6–11	622 (LV)	± 4.5%	44%	51%	-	-	1% (Note: "Some other candidate" with 1%; would not vote with 0%)	4%
Morning Consult	Oct 2–11	2,610 (LV)	± 1.9%	44%	52%	-	-	–	–
Redfield & Wilton Strategies	Oct 9–10	1,145 (LV)	–	44%	49%	1%	-	–	–
Whitman Insight Strategies	Oct 5–9	517 (LV)	± 4.3%	46%	51%	-	-	1%	3%
Baldwin Wallace University	Sep 30 – Oct 8	1,140 (LV)	± 3.1%	45%	50%	1%	0%	0% (Note: "Another candidate" with 0%)	4%
YouGov/CCES	Sep 29 – Oct 7	2,703 (LV)	–	44%	52%	-	-	–	–
Redfield & Wilton Strategies	Oct 4–6	927 (LV)	± 3.22%	42%	49%	1%	-	1% (Note: "Another Third Party/Write-in" with 1%)	7%
Emerson College	Oct 4–5	688 (LV)	± 3.7%	47%	51%	-	-	2%	–
Quinnipiac University	Oct 1–5	1,211 (LV)	± 2.8%	41%	54%	-	-	1%	3%
Ipsos/Reuters	Sep 29 – Oct 5	605 (LV)	± 4.5%	45%	50%	-	-	2% (Note: "Some other candidate" with 2%; would not vote with 0%)	3%
Change Research/CNBC	Oct 2–4	468 (LV)	–	46%	50%	-	-	–	–
Monmouth University	Sep 30 – Oct 4	500 (RV)	± 4.4%	42%	54%	1%	-	0%	2%
Monmouth University	Sep 30 – Oct 4	500 (LV)	± 4.4%	43%	54%	-	-	–	–
Monmouth University	Sep 30 – Oct 4	500 (LV)	± 4.4%	45%	53%	-	-	–	–
YouGov/CBS	Sep 30 – Oct 2	1,287 (LV)	± 3.2%	44%	51%	-	-	2% (Note: "Someone else/third party" with 2%)	5%
Siena College/NYT Upshot	Sep 30 – Oct 2	706 (LV)	± 4.1%	42%	49%	3%	-	0%	5%
SurveyMonkey/Axios	Sep 1–30	4,613 (LV)	–	46%	52%	-	-	–	2%
ABC News/Washington Post	Sep 21–26	567 (LV)	± 5.0%	45%	54%	-	-	0% (Note: "Neither" and "Other" with 0%; would not vote with no voters)	1%
Siena College/NYT Upshot	Sep 25–27	711 (LV)	± 4.3%	40%	49%	2%	-	0%	8%
TIPP/The Federalist	Sep 24–26	774 (LV)	± 3.6%	45%	50%	-	-	1% (Note: "Other" with 1%; "Prefer not to answer" with 0%)	4%
Redfield & Wilton Strategies	Sep 23–25	1,015 (LV)	± 3.08%	44%	50%	0%	–	1%	5%
Fox News	Sep 20–23	856 (LV)	± 3%	44%	51%	2%	–	1%	2%
Fox News	Sep 20–23	910 (RV)	± 3%	43%	51%	2%	–	2% (Note: "Other" and would not vote with 1%)	3%
Baldwin Wallace University	Sep 9–22	1,012 (LV)	± 3.6%	45%	47%	2%	0%	1% (Note: "Another candidate" with 1%)	5%
Trafalgar Group/Restoration PAC	Sep 18–21	1,006 (LV)	± 2.99%	46%	48%	1%	1%	2%	2%
YouGov/UW-Madison Elections Research; Center/Wisconsin State Journal	Sep 10–21	642 (LV)	–	45%	49%	-	-	–	–
Change Research/CNBC	Sep 18–20	579 (LV)	–	45%	49%	-	-	–	–
Franklin & Marshall College	Sep 14–20	480 (LV)	± 7.8%	42%	48%	-	-	–	–
Hart Research Associates/Human Rights Campaign (Note: The Human Rights Campaign endorsed Biden prior to this poll's sampling period)	Sep 17–19	400 (LV)	± 4.9%	42%	53%	-	-	–	–
CPEC (Note: CPEC campaigns exclusively for Democratic candidates)	Sep 15–17	830 (LV)	± 2.3%	45%	50%	-	-	1% (Note: "Third party candidate" with 1%)	4%
Trafalgar Group (R)	Sep 15–17	1,006 (LV)	± 2.99%	45%	47%	2%	1%	2%	2%
Ipsos/Reuters	Sep 11–16	611 (LV)	± 4.5%	46%	49%	-	-	2%	4%
Civiqs/Rust Belt Rising	Sep 11–15	704 (RV)	± 4.4%	45%	52%	-	-	1%	2%
Redfield & Wilton Strategies	Sep 12–14	1,036 (LV)	± 3.04%	44%	49%	1%	1%	0% (Note: "Another Third Party/Write-in" with 0%)	5%
Climate Nexus	Sep 8–11	659 (RV)	± 4%	43%	48%	-	-	3% (Note: "Neither candidate or other candidate" with 3%)	6%
Benenson Strategy Group/GS Strategy Group/AARP	Aug 28 – Sep 8	1,600 (LV)	± 2.5%	46%	49%	-	-	1% (Note: Would not vote with 1%)	4%
Marist College/NBC News	Aug 31 – Sep 7	771 (LV)	± 4.4%	44%	53%	-	-	1%	2%
Morning Consult	Aug 29 – Sep 7	2,227 (LV)	± (2%–4%)	45% (Note: Overlapping sample with the previous Morning Consult poll, but more information available regarding sample size)	50%	-	-	–	–
Change Research/CNBC	Sep 4–6	829 (LV)	–	46%	50%	-	-	4% (Note: "Other/not sure" with 4%)	–
TargetSmart	Sep 3–6	835 (LV)	± 3.4%	44%	51%	-	-	3%	3%
Susquehanna Polling & Research Inc.	Aug 26 – Sep 4	498 (LV)	± 4.3%	42%	44%	-	-	6% (Note: "Other" and "Refused" with 3%)	7%
Redfield & Wilton Strategies	Aug 30 – Sep 3	1,053 (LV)	± 3.02%	43%	48%	1%	1%	1%	7%
Quinnipiac	Aug 28 – Sep 1	1,235 (LV)	± 3%	44%	52%	-	-	1%	3%
ALG Research/Progressive Policy Institute (Note: The Progressive Policy Institute endorsed Biden prior to this poll's sampling period)	Aug 26 – Sep 1	500 (LV)	–	44%	50%	-	-	–	–
Monmouth University	Aug 28–31	400 (RV)	± 4.9%	45%	49%	2%	0%	1% (Note: "No one" with 1%; "Other candidate" with no voters)	4%
Monmouth University	Aug 28–31	400 (LV)	± 4.9%	46% (Note: With a likely voter turnout model featuring higher turnout than in the 2016 presidential election)	49%	-	-	2%	3%
Monmouth University	Aug 28–31	400 (LV)	± 4.9%	47% (Note: With a likely voter turnout model featuring lower turnout than in the 2016 presidential election)	48%	-	-	2%	3%
Hodas & Associates/Restoration PAC	Aug 26–31	600 (LV)	–	45%	51%	-	-	–	4%
SurveyMonkey/Axios	Aug 1–31	3,531 (LV)	–	45%	53%	-	-	–	2%
Morning Consult	Aug 21–30	2,158 (LV)	± (2%–4%)	45%	49%	-	-	–	–
Pulse Opinion Research/Rasmussen Reports	Aug 25–27	1,000 (LV)	± 3%	48% (Note: Additional data sourced from FiveThirtyEight; with voters who lean towards a given candidate)	48%	-	-	4% (Note: "Some other candidate" with 4%)	–
GQR Research/Unite the Country PAC (Note: Unite the Country PAC endorsed Biden prior to this poll's sampling period)	Aug 20–24	971 (LV)	± 4.4%	43%	52%	-	-	–	5%
Franklin & Marshall College	Aug 17–24	681 (RV)	± 5.2%	42%	50%	-	-	3% (Note: "Some other candidate" with 3%)	7%
Change Research/CNBC	Aug 21–23	984 (LV)	–	46%	49%	-	-	–	–
Global Strategy Group/Climate Power 2020 /League of Conservation Voters/Sierra Club (Note: The League of Conservation Voters and the Sierra Club endorsed Biden prior to this poll's sampling period)	Aug 13–19	801 (RV)	± 3.5%	42%	50%	2%	1%	–	5%
Global Strategy Group/Climate Power 2020 /League of Conservation Voters/Sierra Club	Aug 13–19	801 (RV)	± 3.5%	43% (Note: If only Biden and Trump were candidates)	53%	-	-	–	4%
Redfield and Wilton Strategies	Aug 16–17	1,006 (LV)	± 3.1%	41%	48%	1%	1%	1%	8%
Civiqs/Rust Belt Rising	Aug 13–17	617 (RV)	–	44%	51%	-	-	3%	1%
Muhlenberg College/Morning Call	Aug 11–17	416 (LV)	± 5.5%	45%	49%	-	-	3% (Note: "Neither/other" with 3%)	3%
Morning Consult	Aug 7–16	1,777 (LV)	± (2%–4%)	44%	50%	-	-	–	–
Emerson College	Aug 8–10	843 (LV)	± 3.8%	47% (Note: Including voters who lean towards a given candidate)	53%	-	-	–	–
Change Research/CNBC	Aug 7–9	456 (RV)	–	44%	48%	-	-	–	–
YouGov/CBS	Aug 4–7	1,211 (LV)	± 3.7%	43%	49%	-	-	3% (Note: "Someone else/third party" with 3%)	5%
OnMessage Inc./Heritage Action (Note: Heritage Action is the sister organization of the Heritage Foundation, which exclusively endorses Republican candidates)	Aug 2–4	400 (LV)	± 4.7%	46%	50%	-	-	–	4%
YouGov/University of Wisconsin-Madison	Jul 27 – Aug 6	742 (RV)	± 4.9%	41%	50%	-	-	2% (Note: "Other" with 2%; would not vote with 0%)	5%
SurveyMonkey/Axios	Jul 1–31	4,208 (LV)	–	48%	50%	-	-	–	2%
Change Research/CNBC	Jul 24–26	382 (LV)	–	46%	48%	-	-	–	–
Franklin & Marshall College	Jul 20–26	667 (RV)	± 5.5%	41%	50%	-	-	2%	6%
Morning Consult	Jul 17–26	2,092 (LV)	± 2.1%	42%	50%	-	-	–	–
Gravis Marketing	Jul 22–24	1,006 (RV)	± 3.1%	45%	48%	-	-	–	8%
Zogby Analytics	Jul 21–23	809 (RV)	± 3.4%	43%	44%	4%	2%	-	8%
Hodas & Associates/Restoration PAC	Jul 17–22	600 (LV)	–	45%	51%	-	-	–	5%
Redfield & Wilton Strategies	Jul 19–21	1,016 (LV)	–	41%	48%	1%	0%	2% (Note: West (B) and "Another Third Party/Write-In" with 1%)	8%
Fox News	Jul 18–20	793 (RV)	± 3.5%	39%	50%	-	-	5% (Note: "Other" with 4%; would not vote with 1%)	6%
Pulse Opinion Research/Rasmussen Reports/American Greatness PAC	Jul 15–16	750 (LV)	± 4%	46%	51%	-	-	2%	1%
Spry Strategies/American Principles Project (Note: This poll's sponsor is the American Principles Project, a 501(c)(4) organization that supports the Republican Party.)	Jul 11–16	700 (LV)	± 3.7%	48%	47%	-	-	–	5%
Monmouth University	Jul 9–13	401 (RV)	± 4.9%	40%	53%	-	-	3% (Note: "Another candidate" with 3%; "No one" with 0%)	4%
Monmouth University	Jul 9–13	401 (LV)	± 4.9%	42%	52%	-	-	3%	3%
Monmouth University	Jul 9–13	401 (LV)	± 4.9%	44%	51%	-	-	2%	3%
Change Research/CNBC	Jul 10–12	743 (LV)	–	42%	50%	-	-	–	–
Trafalgar Group	Jun 29 – Jul 2	1,062 (LV)	± 2.92%	43%	48%	-	-	6% (Note: "Other party candidate" with 6%)	3%
SurveyMonkey/Axios	Jun 8–30	2,184 (LV)	–	48%	50%	-	-	–	2%
Change Research/CNBC	Jun 26–28	760 (LV)	–	44%	50%	-	-	–	–
Susquehanna Polling/Fox 43	Jun 15–23	715 (LV)	–	41%	46%	-	-	5%	8%
Redfield & Wilton Strategies	Jun 14–16	1,125 (LV)	± 2.92%	39%	49%	1%	1%	1% (Note: "other" with 1%)	9%
Siena College/NYT Upshot	Jun 8–16	651 (RV)	± 4.2%	40%	50%	-	-	3% (Note: "Another candidate" with 2%; would not vote with 1%)	6%
Change Research/CNBC	Jun 12–14	491 (LV)	–	46%	49%	-	-	3% (Note: "Libertarian Party candidate/Green Party candidate" with 3%)	–
Hodas & Associates/Restoration PAC	Jun 8–11	600 (LV)	± 4.0%	42%	54%	-	-	–	4%
Civiqs/Dan Hopkins	Jun 6–11	1,221 (A)	3.6%	46%	49%	-	-	–	5%
Civiqs/Dan Hopkins	May 30 – Jun 2	2,045 (A)	2.4%	46%	49%	-	-	–	5%
Change Research/CNBC	May 29–31	579 (LV)	–	50%	46%	-	-	2%	2%
Morning Consult	May 17–26	2,120 (LV)	–	44%	48%	-	-	–	–
Redfield & Wilton Strategies	May 10–14	963 (LV)	± 3.2%	39%	48%	-	-	2% (Note: "Third party/write-in" with 2%)	11%
Hodas & Associates/Restoration PAC	May 9–13	600 (LV)	± 3.0%	51%	46%	-	-	–	4%
Harper Polling (R)	Apr 21–26	644 (LV)	± 3.9%	43%	49%	-	-	–	8%
Public Policy Polling (Note: Poll sponsored by Protect Our Care, a pro-Affordable Care Act organization)	Apr 20–21	1,251 (RV)	–	44%	51%	-	-	–	5%
Fox News	Apr 18–21	803 (RV)	± 3.5%	42%	50%	-	-	–	–
Ipsos	Apr 15–20	578 (RV)	± 5.0%	40%	46%	-	-	–	–
Susquehanna Research/Fox 43	Apr 14–20	693 (LV)	–	42%	48%	-	-	–	–
Hodas & Associates/Restoration PAC	Apr 16–18	600 (RV)	± 3.0%	47%	47%	-	-	–	6%
Civiqs/Dan Hopkins	Apr 4–8	1,912 (A)	2.5%	47%	47%	-	-	–	6%
Baldwin Wallace University Great Lakes	Mar 17–25	973 (RV)	± 3.9%	47%	45%	-	-	–	9%
Change Research	Mar 21–23	510 (LV)	–	50%	47%	-	-	–	4%
Hodas & Associates/Restoration PAC	Mar 19–21	600 (RV)	–	47%	45%	-	-	–	–
Civiqs/Dan Hopkins	Mar 14–18	1,589 (A)	2.7%	48%	46%	-	-	–	6%
YouGov/Yahoo News	Mar 6–8	725 (RV)	–	40%	46%	-	-	5% (Note: "Other" with 2%; would not vote with 3%)	8%
Firehouse Strategies/Øptimus	Mar 5–7	533 (RV)	± 5.3%	45%	44%	-	-	–	–
Civiqs/Dan Hopkins	Feb 27 – Mar 3	2,462 (A)	2.2%	48%	46%	-	-	–	7%
Muhlenberg College/Morning Call	Feb 12–20	424 (RV)	± 5.5%	47%	47%	-	-	2%	4%
YouGov	Feb 11–20	1,171 (RV)	± 4.0%	45%	46%	-	-	–	–
Quinnipiac University	Feb 12–18	849 (RV)	± 3.4%	42%	50%	-	-	6% (Note: "Someone else" with 1%; would not vote with 5%)	3%
Expedition Strategies/Progressive Policies Institute	Feb 6–18	500 (RV)	–	42%	47%	-	-	–	11%

==== 2017–2019 polls ====
Poll source	Date(s) administered	Sample size	Margin of error	Donald Trump Republican	Joe Biden Democratic	Other	Undecided
Firehouse Strategies/Øptimus	Dec 3–5, 2019	598 (LV)	± 4.3%	45%	41%	8% (Note: A third party candidate with 6%; will not vote with 2%)	6%
Muhlenberg College/Morning Call	Nov 4–9, 2019	410 (RV)	± 6.0%	43%	52%	4%	2%
Siena College/NYT Upshot	Oct 13–25, 2019	661 (LV)	± 4.4%	45%	46%	–	–
Firehouse Strategies/Øptimus	Sep 7–9, 2019	527 (LV)	± 4.2%	41%	45%	14%	–
Firehouse Strategies/Øptimus	Jun 11–13, 2019	565 (LV)	± 4.2%	42%	43%	15%	–
Quinnipiac University	May 9–14, 2019	978 (RV)	± 4.2%	42%	53%	1%	3%
WPA Intelligence	Apr 27–30, 2019	200 (LV)	± 6.9%	45%	46%	–	8%
Emerson College	Mar 26–28, 2019	808 (RV)	± 3.4%	45%	55%	–	–
Firehouse Strategies/Øptimus	Mar 19–21, 2019	632 (LV)	± 4.0%	43%	50%	4%	–

==== Former candidates and hypothetical polling ====
Former candidates

Donald Trump vs. Michael Bloomberg

Poll source	Date(s) administered	Sample size	Margin of error	Donald Trump (R)	Michael Bloomberg (D)	Other	Undecided
Muhlenberg College/Morning Call	Feb 12–20, 2020	424 (RV)	± 5.5 %	48%	45%	2%	5%
Quinnipiac University	Feb 12–18, 2020	849 (RV)	±3.4%	42%	48%	6% (Note: "Someone else" with 2%; would not vote with 4%)	3%
Expedition Strategies/Progressive Policies Institute	Feb 6–18, 2020	500 (RV)	–	39%	48%	–	13%
Firehouse Strategies/Øptimus	Dec 3–5, 2019	598 (LV)	± 4.3%	45%	41%	9% (Note: A third party candidate with 6%; will not vote with 3%)	5%

Donald Trump vs. Pete Buttigieg

Poll source	Date(s) administered	Sample size	Margin of error	Donald Trump (R)	Pete Buttigieg (D)	Other	Undecided
Muhlenberg College/Morning Call	Feb 12–20, 2020	424 (RV)	± 5.5 %	46%	45%	3%	5%
Expedition Strategies/Progressive Policies Institute	Feb 6–18, 2020	500 (RV)	–	40%	46%	–	14%
YouGov	Feb 11–20, 2020	1,171 (RV)	±4.0%	44%	44%	–	–
Quinnipiac University	Feb 12–18, 2020	849 (RV)	±3.4%	43%	47%	8% (Note: "Someone else" with 2%; would not vote with 6%)	2%
Firehouse Strategies/Øptimus	Dec 3–5, 2019	598 (LV)	± 4.3%	46%	40%	7% (Note: A third party candidate with 4%; will not vote with 3%)	7%
Firehouse Strategies/Øptimus	Jun 11–13, 2019	565 (LV)	± 4.2%	45%	32%	23%	–
Quinnipiac University	May 9–14, 2019	978 (RV)	± 4.2%	44%	45%	4%	6%

Donald Trump vs. Kamala Harris

Poll source	Date(s) administered	Sample size	Margin of error	Donald Trump (R)	Kamala Harris (D)	Other	Undecided
Quinnipiac University	May 9–14, 2019	978 (RV)	± 4.2%	45%	45%	3%	5%
Emerson College	Mar 26–28, 2019	808 (RV)	± 3.4%	49%	51%	–	–

Donald Trump vs. Amy Klobuchar

Poll source	Date(s) administered	Sample size	Margin of error	Donald Trump (R)	Amy Klobuchar (D)	Other	Undecided
Muhlenberg College/Morning Call	Feb 12–20, 2020	424 (RV)	± 5.5 %	45%	44%	3%	8%
YouGov	Feb 11–20, 2020	1,171 (RV)	±4.0%	43%	43%	–	–
Quinnipiac University	Feb 12–18, 2020	849 (RV)	±3.4%	42%	49%	6%	4%

Donald Trump vs. Beto O'Rourke

Poll source	Date(s) administered	Sample size	Margin of error	Donald Trump (R)	Beto O'Rourke (D)	Other	Undecided
Quinnipiac University	May 9–14, 2019	978 (RV)	± 4.2%	46%	44%	4%	5%
Emerson College	Mar 26–28, 2019	808 (RV)	± 3.4%	49%	51%	–	–
Firehouse Strategies/Øptimus	Mar 19–21, 2019	632 (LV)	± 4.0%	47%	40%	8%	–

Donald Trump vs. Bernie Sanders

Poll source	Date(s) administered	Sample size	Margin of error	Donald Trump (R)	Bernie Sanders (D)	Other	Undecided
Baldwin Wallace University Great Lakes	Mar 17–25, 2020	973 (RV)	± 3.9%	48%	42%	–	10%
Hodas & Associates/Restoration PAC	Mar 19–21, 2020	600 (RV)	–	49%	43%	–	–
YouGov/Yahoo News	Mar 6–8, 2020	725 (RV)	–	41%	43%	6% (Note: "Other" with 4%; would not vote with 2%)	10%
Firehouse Strategies/Øptimus	Mar 5–7, 2020	533 (RV)	± 5.3 %	46%	42%	–	–
Muhlenberg College/Morning Call	Feb 12–20, 2020	424 (RV)	± 5.5 %	46%	49%	3%	3%
YouGov	Feb 11–20, 2020	1,171 (RV)	±4.0%	45%	47%	–	–
Quinnipiac University	Feb 12–18, 2020	849 (RV)	±3.4%	44%	48%	5% (Note: "Someone else" with 1%; would not vote with 4%)	1%
Expedition Strategies/Progressive Policies Institute	Feb 6–18, 2020	500 (RV)	–	43%	45%	–	12%
Firehouse Strategies/Øptimus	Dec 3–5, 2019	598 (LV)	± 4.3%	48%	37%	8% (Note: A third party candidate with 5%; will not vote with 3%)	6%
Muhlenberg College/Morning Call	Nov 4–9, 2019	410 (RV)	± 6.0%	45%	50%	4%	1%
NYT Upshot/Siena College	Oct 13–25, 2019	661 (LV)	± 4.4%	45%	44%	–	–
Firehouse Strategies/Øptimus	Sep 7–9, 2019	527 (LV)	± 4.2%	42%	44%	14%	–
Firehouse Strategies/Øptimus	Jun 11–13, 2019	565 (LV)	± 4.2%	44%	41%	15%	–
Quinnipiac University	May 9–14, 2019	978 (RV)	± 4.2%	43%	50%	2%	3%
Tulchin Research (D) (Note: Poll sponsored by the Sanders campaign)	Apr 14–18, 2019	400 (LV)	± 4.9%	43%	51%	–	–
Emerson College	Mar 26–28, 2019	808 (RV)	± 3.4%	45%	55%	–	–
Firehouse Strategies/Øptimus	Mar 19–21, 2019	632 (LV)	± 4.0%	44%	44%	8%	–

Donald Trump vs. Elizabeth Warren

Poll source	Date(s) administered	Sample size	Margin of error	Donald Trump (R)	Elizabeth Warren (D)	Other	Undecided
Muhlenberg College/Morning Call	Feb 12–20, 2020	424 (RV)	± 5.5 %	47%	47%	4%	3%
YouGov	Feb 11–20, 2020	1,171 (RV)	±4.0%	45%	45%	–	–
Quinnipiac University	Feb 12–18, 2020	849 (RV)	±3.4%	44%	47%	8%	2%
Firehouse Strategies/Øptimus	Dec 3–5, 2019	598 (LV)	± 4.3%	47%	40%	8%	5%
Muhlenberg College/Morning Call	Nov 4–9, 2019	410 (RV)	± 6.0%	45%	50%	4%	1%
NYT Upshot/Siena College	Oct 13–25, 2019	661 (LV)	± 4.4%	46%	44%	–	–
Firehouse Strategies/Øptimus	Sep 7–9, 2019	527 (LV)	± 4.2%	41%	43%	16%	–
Firehouse Strategies/Øptimus	Jun 11–13, 2019	565 (LV)	± 4.2%	45%	34%	21%	–
Quinnipiac University	May 9–14, 2019	978 (RV)	± 4.2%	44%	47%	3%	4%
Emerson College	Mar 26–28, 2019	808 (RV)	± 3.4%	48%	52%	–	–
Zogby Analytics	Aug 17–23, 2017	813 (LV)	± 3.4%	38%	46%	–	16%

Hypothetical polling

Donald Trump vs. Generic Democrat

Poll source	Date(s) administered	Sample size	Margin of error	Donald Trump (R)	Generic Democrat (D)	Undecided
Baldwin Wallace University/Oakland University/Ohio Northern University	Mar 17–25, 2020	997 (RV)	± 3.7%	48.6% (Note: Figures for each candidate in this poll include undecided voters who were reported to lean towards that candidate at the time of polling.)	49.2%	2.1% (Note: "It depends on who the Democrats nominate" with 1.4%; "unsure" with 0.7%)
Expedition Strategies/Progressive Policies Institute	Feb 6–18, 2020	500 (RV)	–	38%	51%	11%
Baldwin Wallace University/Oakland University/Ohio Northern University	Jan 8–20, 2020	1,037 (RV)	± 3.2%	39.7%	49.5%	10.7%
KFF/Cook Political Report	Sep 23 – Oct 15, 2019	752 (RV)	± 4%	29%	40%	22%

Donald Trump vs. Generic Opponent

Poll source	Date(s) administered	Sample size	Margin of error	Donald Trump (R)	Generic Opponent	Undecided
Muhlenberg College/Morning Call	Oct 23–28, 2020	419 (LV)	± 5.5%	42%	54%	4%
Muhlenberg College/Morning Call Archived November 3, 2020, at the Wayback Machine	Oct 13–20, 2020	416 (LV)	± 5.5%	44%	51%	5%
Muhlenberg College/Morning Call	Aug 11–17, 2020	416 (LV)	± 5.5%	44%	53%	3%
Muhlenberg College/Morning Call	Feb 12–20, 2020	424 (RV)	± 5.5%	42%	54%	4%
Muhlenberg College/Morning Call	Nov 4–9, 2019	410 (RV)	± 6.0%	42%	57%	2%
F&M/PoliticsPA	Mar 18–24, 2019	540 (RV)	± 5.5%	36%	61% (Note: 61% "time for a change" as opposed to "Trump has done a good enough job to deserve re-election")	4%

=== Electoral slates ===
These slates of electors were nominated by each party in order to vote in the Electoral College should their candidates win the state:

Donald Trump and Mike Pence Republican Party	Joe Biden and Kamala Harris Democratic Party	Jo Jorgensen and Spike Cohen Libertarian Party
Robert B. Asher; Bill Bachenberg; Lou Barletta; Ted Christian; Ted Coccodrilli; Bernadette Comfort; Sam DeMarco; Marcela Diaz-Myers; Josephine Ferro; Robert Gleason; Ash Khare; Thomas Marino; Lissa Patton; Pat Poprik; Andy Reilly; Lance Stange; Lawrence Tabas; Christine Toretti; Calvin Tucker; Carolyn Bunny Welsh	Nina Ahmad; Val Arkoosh; Cindy Bass; Rick Bloomingdale; Ryan Boyer; Paige Gebhardt Cognetti; Daisy Cruz; Kathy Dahlkemper; Janet Diaz; Charles Hadley; Jordan Harris; Malcolm Kenyatta; Gerald Lawrence; Clifford Levine; Virginia McGregor; Nancy Mills; Marian Moskowitz; Josh Shapiro; Sharif Street; Connie Williams	Kyle Burton; Henry Conoly; Daniel Cooper; Thomas Eckman; Greg Faust; Kevin Gaughen; Willie Harmon; Ken Krawchuk; Brandon Magoon; Roy Minet; Paul Nicotera; Paul Rizzo; Richard Schwartzman; William Sloane; Kathleen Smith; Jake Towne; Glenn Tuttle; Stephen Wharhaftig; John Waldenberger; Daniel Wassmer

=== Results ===
9,098,998 residents registered to vote by the voter registration deadline on October 15, which had been extended from its original date on October 13 by court order.

2020 United States presidential election in Pennsylvania
Party	Candidate	Votes	%	±%
Democratic	Joe Biden; Kamala Harris	3,458,229	50.01	+2.55
Republican	Donald Trump (incumbent); Mike Pence (incumbent)	3,377,674	48.84	+0.66
Libertarian	Jo Jorgensen; Spike Cohen	79,380	1.14	−1.24
Green	Howie Hawkins (write-in) Angela Walker (write-in)	1,282	0.02	−0.79
American Solidarity	Brian T. Carroll (write-in) Amar Patel (write-in)	362	0.01	N/A
Write-in		20,049	0.29	-0.31
Total votes		6,936,976	100.00%	N/A
Democratic win				

==== By county ====
County	Joe Biden Democratic		Donald Trump Republican		Jo Jorgensen Libertarian		Various candidates Other parties		Margin		Total votes cast
County	#	%	#	%	#	%	#	%	#	%	Total votes cast
Adams	18,254	32.13%	37,567	66.13%	814	1.43%	174	0.31%	−19,313	−34.00%	56,809
Allegheny	430,759	59.43%	282,913	39.03%	8,361	1.15%	2,767	0.38%	147,846	20.40%	724,800
Armstrong	8,457	23.22%	27,489	75.47%	424	1.16%	56	0.15%	−19,032	−52.25%	36,426
Beaver	38,122	40.38%	54,759	58.01%	1,241	1.31%	275	0.29%	−16,637	−17.63%	94,397
Bedford	4,367	15.82%	23,025	83.39%	182	0.66%	36	0.13%	−18,658	−67.57%	27,610
Berks	93,116	45.08%	109,926	53.22%	2,924	1.42%	587	0.28%	−16,810	−8.14%	206,553
Blair	17,636	27.67%	45,306	71.07%	653	1.02%	153	0.24%	−27,670	−43.40%	63,748
Bradford	8,046	26.61%	21,600	71.45%	513	1.70%	73	0.24%	−13,554	−44.84%	30,232
Bucks	204,712	51.53%	187,367	47.16%	4,155	1.05%	1,057	0.27%	17,345	4.37%	397,291
Butler	37,508	33.00%	74,359	65.42%	1,438	1.27%	358	0.31%	−36,851	−32.42%	113,663
Cambria	21,730	30.71%	48,085	67.96%	759	1.07%	177	0.25%	−26,355	−37.25%	70,751
Cameron	634	25.98%	1,771	72.58%	29	1.19%	6	0.25%	−1,137	−46.60%	2,440
Carbon	11,212	33.28%	21,984	65.26%	433	1.29%	60	0.18%	−10,772	−31.98%	33,689
Centre	40,055	51.42%	36,372	46.70%	1,066	1.37%	398	0.51%	3,683	4.72%	77,891
Chester	182,372	57.76%	128,565	40.72%	3,565	1.13%	1,251	0.40%	53,807	17.04%	315,753
Clarion	4,678	23.96%	14,578	74.67%	237	1.21%	31	0.16%	−9,900	−50.71%	19,524
Clearfield	9,673	24.49%	29,203	73.94%	546	1.38%	74	0.19%	−19,530	−49.45%	39,496
Clinton	5,502	31.15%	11,902	67.39%	221	1.25%	36	0.20%	−6,400	−36.24%	17,661
Columbia	10,532	33.67%	20,098	64.25%	541	1.73%	109	0.35%	−9,566	−30.58%	31,280
Crawford	12,924	30.69%	28,561	67.82%	521	1.24%	108	0.26%	−15,637	−37.13%	42,114
Cumberland	62,245	43.78%	77,212	54.30%	2,138	1.50%	592	0.42%	−14,967	−10.52%	142,187
Dauphin	78,983	53.40%	66,408	44.90%	1,977	1.34%	533	0.36%	12,575	8.50%	147,901
Delaware	206,709	62.75%	118,639	36.02%	2,981	0.90%	1,075	0.33%	88,070	26.73%	329,404
Elk	4,522	26.68%	12,140	71.64%	244	1.44%	40	0.24%	−7,618	−44.96%	16,946
Erie	68,286	49.66%	66,869	48.63%	1,928	1.40%	411	0.30%	1,417	1.03%	137,494
Fayette	20,469	32.87%	41,251	66.24%	468	0.75%	91	0.15%	−20,782	−33.37%	62,279
Forest	728	27.43%	1,882	70.91%	36	1.36%	8	0.30%	−1,154	−43.48%	2,654
Franklin	22,422	27.67%	57,245	70.65%	1,116	1.38%	242	0.30%	−34,823	−42.98%	81,025
Fulton	1,085	13.58%	6,824	85.41%	68	0.85%	13	0.26%	−5,739	−71.83%	7,990
Greene	4,911	27.75%	12,579	71.08%	179	1.01%	28	0.16%	−7,668	−43.33%	17,697
Huntingdon	5,445	23.84%	17,061	74.69%	286	1.25%	51	0.22%	−11,616	−50.85%	22,843
Indiana	12,634	30.60%	28,089	68.03%	475	1.15%	91	0.22%	−15,455	−37.43%	41,289
Jefferson	4,529	19.80%	17,964	78.54%	337	1.47%	42	0.18%	−13,435	−58.74%	22,872
Juniata	2,253	18.66%	9,649	79.93%	141	1.17%	29	0.24%	−7,396	−61.27%	12,072
Lackawanna	61,991	53.58%	52,334	45.23%	1,085	0.94%	285	0.25%	9,657	8.35%	115,695
Lancaster	115,847	41.17%	160,209	56.94%	4,183	1.49%	1,136	0.40%	−44,362	−15.77%	281,375
Lawrence	15,978	34.59%	29,597	64.08%	501	1.08%	111	0.24%	−13,619	−29.49%	46,187
Lebanon	23,932	33.30%	46,731	65.03%	989	1.38%	206	0.29%	−22,799	−31.73%	71,858
Lehigh	98,498	53.05%	84,418	45.47%	2,176	1.17%	563	0.30%	14,080	7.58%	185,655
Luzerne	64,873	42.26%	86,929	56.63%	1,519	0.99%	178	0.12%	−22,056	−14.37%	153,499
Lycoming	16,971	28.57%	41,462	69.80%	821	1.38%	143	0.24%	−24,491	−41.23%	59,397
McKean	5,098	26.13%	14,083	72.18%	285	1.46%	44	0.23%	−8,985	−46.05%	19,510
Mercer	21,067	36.25%	36,143	62.19%	744	1.28%	163	0.28%	−15,076	−25.94%	58,117
Mifflin	4,603	21.36%	16,670	77.37%	229	1.06%	45	0.21%	−12,067	−56.01%	21,547
Monroe	44,060	52.43%	38,726	46.08%	1,043	1.24%	205	0.24%	5,334	6.35%	84,034
Montgomery	319,511	62.41%	185,460	36.23%	5,186	1.01%	1,763	0.35%	134,051	26.18%	511,920
Montour	3,771	38.41%	5,844	59.53%	156	1.59%	46	0.47%	−2,073	−21.12%	9,817
Northampton	85,087	49.64%	83,854	48.92%	2,001	1.17%	457	0.27%	1,233	0.72%	171,399
Northumberland	12,703	29.94%	28,975	68.28%	657	1.55%	100	0.24%	−16,272	−38.34%	42,435
Perry	5,950	24.06%	18,293	73.98%	409	1.65%	76	0.31%	−12,343	−49.92%	24,728
Philadelphia	604,175	81.21%	132,870	17.86%	4,854	0.65%	2,067	0.28%	471,305	63.35%	743,966
Pike	13,052	40.02%	19,241	58.99%	323	0.99%	0	0.00%	−6,189	−18.97%	32,616
Potter	1,726	19.00%	7,239	79.68%	99	1.09%	21	0.23%	−5,513	−60.68%	9,085
Schuylkill	20,727	29.29%	48,871	69.07%	1,005	1.42%	152	0.21%	−28,144	−39.78%	70,755
Snyder	4,910	25.60%	13,983	72.90%	247	1.29%	41	0.21%	−9,073	−47.30%	19,181
Somerset	8,654	21.30%	31,466	77.45%	423	1.04%	83	0.20%	−22,812	−56.15%	40,626
Sullivan	921	25.60%	2,619	72.79%	55	1.53%	3	0.08%	−1,698	−47.19%	3,598
Susquehanna	6,236	28.59%	15,207	69.72%	309	1.42%	61	0.28%	−8,971	−41.13%	21,813
Tioga	4,955	23.45%	15,742	74.51%	378	1.79%	51	0.24%	−10,787	−51.06%	21,126
Union	7,475	37.02%	12,356	61.19%	284	1.41%	77	0.38%	−4,881	−24.17%	20,192
Venango	7,585	28.51%	18,569	69.81%	374	1.41%	73	0.27%	−10,984	−41.30%	26,601
Warren	6,066	29.37%	14,237	68.92%	347	1.68%	7	0.03%	−8,171	−39.55%	20,657
Washington	45,088	37.97%	72,080	60.70%	1,310	1.10%	278	0.23%	−26,992	−22.73%	118,756
Wayne	9,191	32.65%	18,637	66.21%	261	0.93%	58	0.21%	−9,446	−33.56%	28,147
Westmoreland	72,192	35.16%	130,299	63.46%	2,353	1.15%	486	0.24%	−58,107	−28.30%	205,330
Wyoming	4,704	31.57%	9,936	66.68%	218	1.46%	42	0.28%	−5,232	−35.11%	14,900
York	88,114	36.85%	146,733	61.36%	3,624	1.52%	675	0.28%	−58,619	−24.51%	239,146
Totals	3,461,221	49.85%	3,379,055	48.69%	79,445	1.14%	20,728	0.30%	82,166	1.16%	6,940,449

Counties that flipped from Republican to Democratic

- Erie (largest municipality: Erie)
- Northampton (largest municipality: Bethlehem)

==== By congressional district ====
Biden and Trump both won half of the 18 congressional districts in Pennsylvania, including each winning one held by the opposite party.

District	Trump	Biden	Representative
1st	47%	52%	Brian Fitzpatrick
2nd	29%	70%	Brendan Boyle
3rd	8%	91%	Dwight Evans
4th	37%	62%	Madeleine Dean
5th	34%	65%	Mary Gay Scanlon
6th	42%	57%	Chrissy Houlahan
7th	47%	52%	Susan Wild
8th	52%	47%	Matt Cartwright
9th	65%	34%	Dan Meuser
10th	51%	48%	Scott Perry
11th	60%	38%	Lloyd Smucker
12th	67%	31%	Fred Keller
13th	72%	27%	John Joyce
14th	63%	36%	Guy Reschenthaler
15th	71%	28%	Glenn Thompson
16th	59%	40%	Mike Kelly
17th	48%	51%	Conor Lamb
18th	34%	65%	Mike Doyle

== Analysis ==
Throughout the year, Pennsylvania was regarded as the most important (or likely tipping-point) state in the entire election; Pennsylvania had 20 electoral votes, and it was one of the closest states of the 2016 presidential election. Both candidates aggressively played for the state; Trump needed the state as it represented his narrow path to re-election, while Biden needed the state to rebuild the blue wall, which Trump had broken in 2016 by carrying the northern industrial states of Michigan, Pennsylvania, and Wisconsin.

Historically, Pennsylvania has usually been a competitive state. During the Second Party System from 1828 to 1852, it voted for the winner of every election. From the Civil War on, it has generally had a partisan lean; during the Third and Fourth Party Systems, Pennsylvania was a classic Yankee Republican state. When Franklin Roosevelt carried it in 1936, he became the first Democrat in eighty years to do so. Between 1936 and 1988, neither major party carried Pennsylvania for more than three straight presidential elections, although between 1952 and 1988, it voted Democratic in every close election (1960, 1968, 1976), and consistently voted more Democratic than the nation. Starting in 1992, Pennsylvania became part of the blue wall—the group of states that voted Democratic for six straight elections from 1992 through 2012. In 2016, it was one of three blue wall states that Trump won on his way to an upset victory.

State Republicans sought to require that only mail-in ballots received by Election Day be counted. The Commonwealth's Supreme Court rejected their demands, deciding that, due to probable delays due to the ongoing coronavirus and U.S. Postal Service crisis, ballots received up to three days after Election Day would also be counted. Republicans then appealed the decision to the U.S. Supreme Court. Supreme Court justices produced a 4–4 tie (as the late Ruth Bader Ginsburg's seat remained vacant when the ruling was issued), with Chief Justice John Roberts siding with the three liberal justices, allowing the state supreme court decision to stand.

At 1.17%, Biden's winning margin percentage in Pennsylvania was the smallest ever for a Democratic presidential candidate who won Pennsylvania. Pennsylvania remained redder than the country in 2020 even as Biden won it, by about 3.3%. As in Michigan and Wisconsin, Biden ran behind Barack Obama's performances in 2008 and 2012, though he received more votes total in the state this cycle due to record-breaking turnout. Biden's margin of victory was also less than Al Gore's 4.2% margin of victory in 2000 and John Kerry's 2.5% margin of victory in 2004.

As for Trump, he easily set the record for total number of votes for a Republican candidate in Pennsylvania history (as with Biden, largely due to record-breaking turnout). With 48.84% of the vote, he did slightly outpace both his own vote share in 2016 (48.18%) and George W. Bush's in 2004 (48.42%), the latter of which had previously stood as the highest Republican vote share in the state since 1988.

Biden's strongest base of support was the Philadelphia metro area. In the city of Philadelphia itself, Biden won by 63.4%, a weaker win than Hillary Clinton's 66.9% margin in the city in 2016, but still better than Kerry's 61.1% margin in 2004 or Gore's 62.0% margin in 2000. Donald Trump improved his vote share in Philadelphia by 2.5%, and, as of the counting on November 8, held a majority of the vote in the 26th, 58th, and 66th wards. Pennsylvania's 2nd congressional district, encompassing Northeast Philadelphia, swung towards Trump from 2016 to 2020.

However, Biden improved on Hillary Clinton dramatically in the Main Line counties of Montgomery and Chester, as well as, to a lesser extent, Delaware, increasing the Democratic vote share in these counties by 4.2%, 5.9%, and 3.5%, respectively, and winning them all by double digits. Before 1992, all three had been Republican strongholds in the state, and Chester had been considered a swing county as recently as 2012, when Romney narrowly carried it, but all three have drifted towards the Democratic column, as they tend to be socially liberal.

Biden also performed strongly in Pennsylvania's other urban, suburban, and exurban areas. Crucially, he carried Allegheny County (Pittsburgh) by 20.4%, the widest margin any nominee had won the county by since 1992. Centre and Dauphin both remained in the Democratic column; in the past, these counties voted Republican, though Centre County is home to Pennsylvania State University, while Dauphin County, home of Harrisburg, has followed the trend of urban areas becoming more Democratic. Biden also narrowly reclaimed two counties anchored by industrial cities which had long voted Democratic before Trump flipped them in 2016, Northampton (Bethlehem and Easton) and Erie (Erie), and improved on Hillary Clinton's margin in his birth county of Lackawanna County (Scranton), a county Hillary Clinton had barely kept in the Democratic column in 2016. In suburban Cumberland County, adjacent to Harrisburg, Biden shaved Trump's margin from 17.8% to 10.5%. Northampton and Erie were the only counties to flip from one party to the other; Northampton has voted for the winner of the state in every election from 1952 on.

Trump maintained much of his momentum throughout rural and industrial Pennsylvania from four years earlier, with convincing victories in counties that were once competitive or even Democratic-leaning. He kept Luzerne County (Wilkes-Barre), which had voted Democratic six elections in a row before 2016 (and which had voted with the winner of the state from 1936 through 2016), in his column, although his margin in it was cut from 19.3% to 14.3%. Trump also won the former Democratic stronghold of Westmoreland County, although his margin in this county, crucial to his win in 2016, declined. Other previously competitive counties that Trump performed well in included Berks and Cambria, both of which voted for Obama in 2008. Trump further ran up the score in other conservative exurban counties, most notably in Lancaster and Lebanon counties, though his margin shrank somewhat in both.

Trump won whites in the state by 15 points, although like in the rest of the country, there was a clear disparity between college-educated and non-college-educated whites. Biden won whites with a college degree by 9 points, while Trump excelled with whites without a college degree, winning this group by 32 points. Additionally, there was a gender disparity with the white vote; Trump won white men by 15 points, but only carried white women by 3 points. Finally, there was an age gap; Biden won young voters by double-digit margins, whereas Trump performed strongly with middle-aged voters; senior citizens were more even, breaking slightly for Trump. Within minority blocs, Biden fared well, as he won black voters by 87 points, and won Latinos by 42 points. Three other critical voting blocs broke for Biden this cycle; he won independent voters by 8 points, moderates by 17 points, and first-time voters by 23 points.

=== Voter demographics ===
Edison Research exit poll
Demographic subgroup	Biden	Trump	No answer	% of voters
Party
Democrat	92	7	N/A	40
Republican	8	91	N/A	41
Independent	52	44	N/A	19
Gender
Men	44	55	1	47
Women	55	44	1	53
Race
White	42	57	1	81
Black	92	7	1	11
Latino	69	27	4	5
Asian	N/A	N/A	N/A	1
Other	N/A	N/A	N/A	1
Gender by race/ethnicity
White men	37	62	1	38
White women	47	52	1	43
Black men	89	10	1	5
Black women	94	4	2	6
Latino men (of any race)	N/A	N/A	1	3
Latino women (of any race)	83	15	2	3
All other races	62	33	5	2
Age
18–24 years old	59	37	3	7
25–29 years old	67	31	2	6
30–39 years old	61	37	2	16
40–49 years old	52	46	2	13
50–64 years old	41	59	N/A	31
65 and older	46	53	1	28
Sexual orientation
LGBT	64	34	2	7
Heterosexual	47	52	1	93
First time voter
First time voter	52	45	3	13
Everyone else	48	52	N/A	87
Education
High school or less	35	64	1	16
Some college education	49	49	2	26
Associate degree	46	53	1	17
Bachelor's degree	54	45	1	26
Advanced degree	63	36	1	14
Education by race/ethnicity
White college graduates	54	45	1	26
White no college degree	20	79	1	35
Non-white college graduates	83	16	1	14
Non-white no college degree	80	19	1	25
Income
Under $30,000	60	37	3	15
$30,000–49,999	53	45	3	19
$50,000–99,999	53	46	1	23
$100,000–199,999	51	48	1	23
Over $200,000	N/A	N/A	N/A	7
Abortion should be
Legal in all cases	84	15	1	25
Legal in most cases	67	32	1	30
Illegal in most cases	17	83	1	27
Illegal in all cases	12	85	3	13
Region
Northeast	46	53	1	17
Philly Suburbs	81	18	1	11
Central	38	61	1	22
West	43	56	1	28
Source: CNN

== Aftermath ==
On November 24, 2020, the Secretary of the Commonwealth of Pennsylvania, Kathy Boockvar, certified the results, and Governor Tom Wolf, in accordance with the law, signed the certificate of ascertainment for the Biden/Harris slate of electors for Biden and Harris and sent it to the Archivist of the United States.

On November 25, 2020, the Pennsylvania Senate Majority (Republican) Policy committee held a public hearing regarding the counting of ballots in this election. Trump planned to attend the meeting but he canceled the trip.

Also, on November 25, after a group of Republican congressmen had filed a lawsuit to stop certification on Sunday November 22, Judge Patricia McCullough (R) ruled to halt further state certifications pending a hearing. The Pennsylvania Supreme Court then ruled Saturday night on November 28 to unanimously overturn Judge Patricia McCullough's ruling to halt certification because no fraud was alleged and both parties could have objected throughout the year, but did not.

On December 31, 2020, Pennsylvania Congressman Dan Meuser (PA-9), Congressman Glenn 'GT' Thompson (PA-15), Congressman Mike Kelly (PA-16), Congressman Scott Perry (PA-10), Congressman Lloyd Smucker (PA-11), Congressman Guy Reschenthaler (PA-14), Congressman John Joyce (PA-13), and Congressman Fred Keller (PA-12) released a statement that summarized their belief that the Pennsylvania state legislature had taken unlawful actions regarding the 2020 election process which, in their opinion, resulted in a "highly questionable and inaccurate vote total".

=== Official audits and recounts ===
As required by state law, all counties completed a post-election sample audit. With the exception of three counties, Pennsylvania's counties also participated in a voluntary risk-limiting audit pilot. Both types of audits confirmed the certified results.

Lycoming County completed a hand recount and did not find any major discrepancy. Butler County also completed a hand recount in two precincts and found no inaccuracies.

=== Objection ===
On January 6, 2021, as Congress certified the Electoral College results confirming President-elect Joe Biden and Vice President-elect Kamala Harris as the winners, there was an objection to Pennsylvania's 20 electoral votes, brought forward by U.S. Representative Scott Perry of Pennsylvania's 10th congressional district and officially signed onto by U.S. Senator Josh Hawley of Missouri. The objection failed 7–92 in the Senate, and 138–282 in the House.

== See also ==
- United States presidential elections in Pennsylvania
- 2020 Pennsylvania elections
- 2020 Democratic Party presidential primaries
- 2020 Republican Party presidential primaries
- 2020 United States elections
- Post-election lawsuits related to the 2020 United States presidential election

== Notes ==
Partisan clients

Additional candidates
