= Timothy DeFoor =

American politician (born 1961 or 1962)

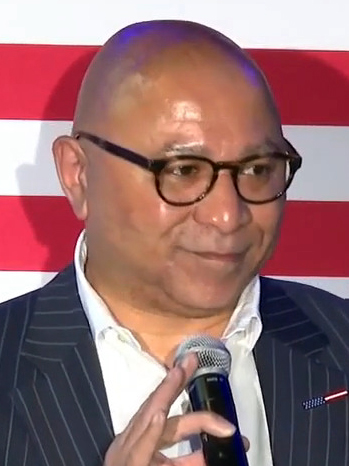
- DeFoor in 2024

50th Auditor General of Pennsylvania
- Incumbent
- Assumed office January 19, 2021
- Governor: Tom Wolf; Josh Shapiro
- Preceded by: Eugene DePasquale

Controller of Dauphin County
- In office January 4, 2016 – January 19, 2021
- Preceded by: Marie Rebuck
- Succeeded by: Mary Bateman

Personal details
- Born: Timothy Lionel DeFoor; 1961 or 1962 (age 63–64)
- Party: Republican
- Education: Pennsylvania State University (BA); University of Pittsburgh (BA); Harrisburg University of Science and Technology (MS)

Timothy Lionel DeFoor (born 1961 or 1962) is an American politician serving as the 50th Pennsylvania auditor general since 2021. A member of the Republican Party, he previously served as controller of Dauphin County, Pennsylvania from 2016 to 2021.

DeFoor's victory in the 2020 Pennsylvania Auditor General election made him the first African-American and person of color to win an election to a statewide executive office in Pennsylvania, and the second to hold statewide office following Tim Reese. Upon taking office as auditor general, DeFoor also became the first Republican to hold that office since Barbara Hafer, who left office in 1997.

== Early life and education ==
DeFoor was born in 1961 or 1962. He graduated from Susquehanna Township High School. DeFoor holds an associate degree in paralegal studies from Harrisburg Area Community College. He also graduated from Pennsylvania State University with a bachelor's degree in psychology, and earned a second bachelor's degree from the University of Pittsburgh in sociology and history. DeFoor earned a master's degree in project management from Harrisburg University of Science and Technology.

== Career ==
=== Early career ===
DeFoor began his career in 1986 as an investigator for the Dauphin County public defender's office. He subsequently worked as an investigator for Pennsylvania's office of the Inspector General and the Pennsylvania attorney general. He has also worked as an internal auditor and fraud investigator for UPMC Health Plan, and as a consultant for Booz Allen Hamilton.

=== County controller ===
DeFoor won election to the office of Dauphin County controller in 2015, defeating Democratic nominee Eric Gutshall. He was the first African-American to win election to a county row office in Dauphin County. During his first term as controller, DeFoor's work won recognition from the Government Finance Officers Association. DeFoor won re-election in 2019, running unopposed. After being elected auditor general, DeFoor submitted his resignation as county controller on December 21, 2020, to take effect on the morning of January 19, 2021. Mary Bateman was elected on November 2, 2021, to succeed him as controller.

=== Auditor General ===
DeFoor announced his intent to run in the 2020 Pennsylvania Auditor General election on December 19, 2019. DeFoor was endorsed by the Pennsylvania Republican Party in January 2020, leading one of his Republican primary opponents, Dennis Stuckey, to withdraw from the race. The other remaining Republican in the field, Cris Dush, later withdrew to seek a seat in the Pennsylvania State Senate, leaving DeFoor as the sole candidate in the Republican primary. In the general election, DeFoor was pitted against Nina Ahmad, a progressive activist and former deputy mayor of Philadelphia. On November 6, 2020, the Associated Press called the race for DeFoor.

DeFoor took office as auditor general on January 19, 2021, succeeding Democrat Eugene DePasquale. In his inaugural address, DeFoor paid tribute to figures such as John Lewis, who he credited with paving the way for himself to enter politics, and pledged to "look at every issue through a non-partisan lens." He further pledged to maintain members of DePasquale's staff who he felt were capable. He stated that one of his priorities as auditor general would be to complete an audit of governor Tom Wolf's COVID-19 business waiver program.

== Electoral history ==
2015 Dauphin County Controller election
Party	Candidate	Votes	%
Republican	Timothy DeFoor	22,100	55.75%
Democratic	Eric Gutshall	17,532	44.23%
Write-in		8	0.02%
Total votes		39,640	100.00%

2019 Dauphin County Controller election
Party	Candidate	Votes	%
Republican	Timothy DeFoor (incumbent)	32,293	99.76%
Write-in		79	0.24%
Total votes		32,372	100.00%

2020 Pennsylvania Auditor General election
Party	Candidate	Votes	%	±%
Republican	Timothy DeFoor	3,338,009	49.44%	+4.36%
Democratic	Nina Ahmad	3,129,131	46.35%	−3.66%
Libertarian	Jennifer Moore	205,929	3.05%	+0.82%
Green	Olivia Faison	78,588	1.16%	−1.53%
Total votes		6,751,657	100.00%	
Republican gain from Democratic				

2024 Pennsylvania Auditor General election
Party	Candidate	Votes	%	±%
Republican	Timothy DeFoor (incumbent)	3,489,296	51.13%	+1.73%
Democratic	Malcolm Kenyatta	3,134,631	45.94%	−0.36%
Libertarian	Reece Smith	122,975	1.80%	−1.25%
Constitution	Bob Goodrich	55,956	0.82%	N/A
American Solidarity	Eric Anton	20,976	0.31%	N/A
Total votes		6,824,454	100.00%	
Republican hold				

Party political offices
Preceded by John Brown	Republican nominee for Auditor General of Pennsylvania; 2020, 2024	Most recent
Political offices
Preceded by Eugene DePasquale	Auditor General of Pennsylvania; 2021–present	Incumbent
