= Nina Ahmad =

American politician

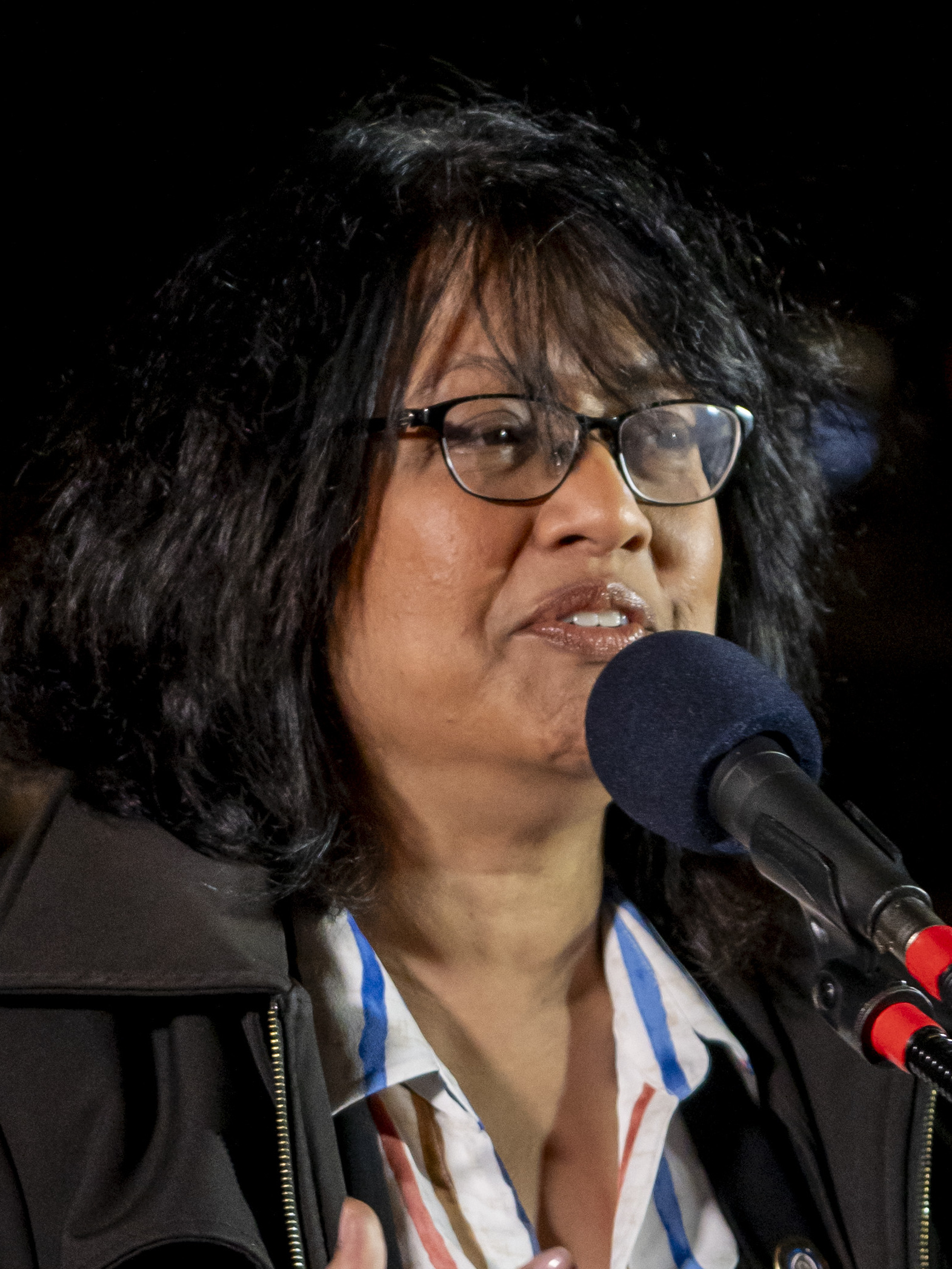
- Ahmad in 2024

Member of the Philadelphia City Council from At-Large
- Incumbent
- Assumed office January 1, 2024
- Preceded by: Sharon Vaughn

Deputy Mayor of Philadelphia for Public Engagement
- In office January 2016 – November 2017
- Appointed by: Jim Kenney

Personal details
- Born: 1960 (age 65–66) Bangladesh
- Party: Democratic
- Spouse: Ahsan Nasratullah
- Children: 2
- Education: Lawrence Technological University; University of Pennsylvania
- Website: Campaign

Nina Ahmad (born 1960) is an American scientist, politician, and women's rights activist from Pennsylvania. She was elected in 2023 to be an at-large member of Philadelphia City Council and is the first person of South Asian descent to serve on the council.

She was the Democratic nominee for the 2020 Pennsylvania Auditor General election which she lost to Timothy DeFoor. She previously ran for Lieutenant Governor in 2018 but lost in the Democratic primary to John Fetterman.

== Early life and education ==
Ahmad was born and raised in Bangladesh and lived through the Bangladesh Liberation War. When she was 21, She moved to Michigan alone where she received an undergraduate degree from Lawrence Technological University. She then moved to Philadelphia in 1983 to pursue a PhD in chemistry from the University of Pennsylvania and completed a molecular genetics postdoctoral fellowship at Thomas Jefferson University. She married Ahsan Nasratullah and settled in the Mt. Airy neighborhood of Philadelphia, where they raised their 2 daughters.

== Career ==
After stints at Wills Eye Hospital and serving as President of a life sciences company, she became involved in government affairs as the executive vice president of government affairs at JNA Capital, a real estate company. During this time, Ahmad became the first Bangladeshi-American to be appointed to a position in the Obama Administration when President Barack Obama appointed her to the Commission on Asian Americans and Pacific Islanders in 2014, while also serving on Michael Nutter's commission on Asian American Affairs while he was Mayor of Philadelphia.

Ahmad also had a large role in the governance of the National Organization for Women, becoming the President of the Philadelphia Chapter in 2013, until being appointed to serve in Mayor Jim Kenney's administration as Deputy Mayor of Philadelphia for Public Engagement. She served in that position for a year before resigning to run for Congress. When electoral conditions changed, she instead ran and lost a bid for Lt. Governor, at which time she returned to serving on the National Board for the National Organization for Women before heading the Pennsylvania Chapter as its president.

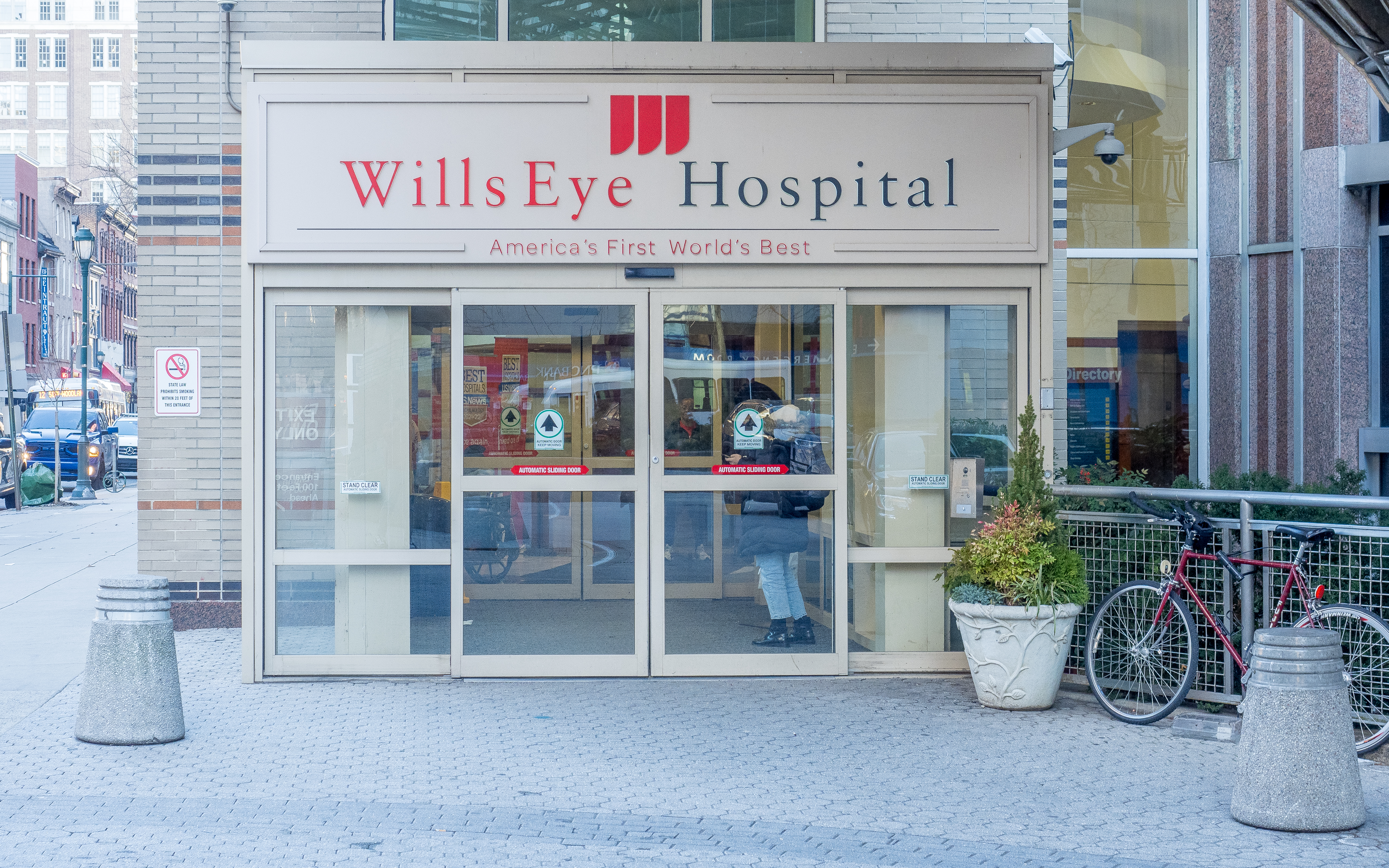
Entrance to Will Eye Institute

== Political career ==
=== 2017 congressional election ===
In November 2017, Ahmad announced her resignation as Deputy Mayor to launch a primary challenge against Bob Brady. She later withdrew after redistricting moved her out of the district.

=== 2018 Lieutenant Governor election ===
In February 2018, after redistricting, Ahmad withdrew from the congressional race to announce that she would challenge incumbent Lieutenant Governor Mike Stack to run alongside Tom Wolf in the 2018 Pennsylvania gubernatorial election. She placed second with 23.8% of the vote, losing to John Fetterman, who would go on to win in the general election.

=== 2020 Auditor General election ===
In October 2019, Ahmad announced her candidacy for Pennsylvania Auditor General after Democratic incumbent Eugene DePasquale declined to seek re-election and instead ran for Pennsylvania's 10th congressional district. Ahmad defeated five other candidates to win the Democratic primary, receiving 36% of the vote.

In the general election, Ahmad faced Republican Timothy DeFoor. Given that Ahmad is Bangladeshi American and DeFoor is African American, the election meant that the victor would be the first person of color to be elected to statewide executive office in Pennsylvania. DeFoor went on to win the general election in November, defeating Ahmad by under 209,000 votes.

=== 2023 City Council election ===
In December 2022, Ahmad announced that she would seek one of the five nominations for the 2023 Philadelphia City Council at-large election. Ahmad successfully won one of the five nominations after raising the campaign contribution limits for the race by donating to her own campaign and receiving 63,465 votes in the Democratic primary. Her campaign focused on making Philadelphia healthier and drew upon her background as a medical scientist. She advanced to the general election in November and won a seat on the city council.

Party political offices
Preceded by Eugene DePasquale	Democratic nominee for Pennsylvania Auditor General; 2020	Succeeded by Malcolm Kenyatta
