= Green Party of Pennsylvania =

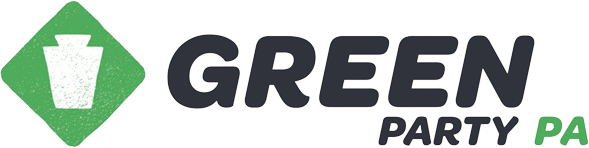
- Co-Chairs: Timothy Runkle and Colleen Schmotzer
- Secretary: Bryarr Misner
- Treasurer: Jeff "J.J." Kondrich
- Headquarters: Philadelphia, PA
- Membership (2026): ▼12,160
- Ideology: Green politics; Anti-capitalism; Eco-socialism
- National affiliation: Green Party of the United States
- Colors: Green
- Seats in the US Senate: 0 / 2
- Seats in the US House: 0 / 18
- Seats in the State Senate: 0 / 50
- Seats in the State House: 0 / 203
- Elected Officials: 19 (July 2020)

Website
- gpofpa.org

The Green Party of Pennsylvania is the Pennsylvania state party affiliate of the Green Party of the United States. Between 2016 and 2020, the party was recognized as a minor political party under Pennsylvania law due to receiving the required voter turnout in the 2016 election. The voter threshold was not met in 2020 or since; as such, it is currently recognized as a political body.

As of early 2018, the party has at least 19 members elected to office statewide.

== Party platform and ideology ==
The Green Party of Pennsylvania supports the Ten Key Values of the Green Party of the United States.

The party platform includes: creation of a single payer universal healthcare system, establishment of a living wage, decriminalization of cannabis, a ban on fracking and nuclear energy, investment in sustainable energy such as solar and wind, and improvements to the state election system.

== Party structure ==
The Green Party of Pennsylvania's highest body is the State Committee, made up of delegates from county affiliate parties, and is governed by internal bylaws. In keeping with the Green Party's key value of "decentralization", county affiliates draft their own bylaws and procedures, including how to nominate and elect delegates to the State Committee. The party also elects a Steering Committee of two co-chairs, one secretary, one treasurer, and three at-large Steering Committee members.

In addition to the governing State Committee, the party operates a number of teams for critical functions, including: the Core Team (formerly Operations), Communications Team, Finance Team, and GreenWave Team.

The Green Party of Pennsylvania nominates electoral candidates by caucus instead of primary elections. During presidential election years, electoral delegates to the GPUS (Green Party of the United States) Presidential Nominating Convention are determined by closed primary.

As of early 2018, 24 county chapters are recognized by the state party, the largest of which are the Green Party of Philadelphia, and the Green Party of Allegheny County (Pittsburgh region).

== Current elected officials ==
At least 19 persons affiliated with the party have been elected to office in the state of Pennsylvania.

List of Green Party officials, with position occupied and county of office
Official	Current position	County
Jay Ting Walker	Pittsburgh Inspector of Elections	Allegheny County
Tara Yaney	Edgewood Borough Council	Allegheny County
Jim Keller	West Reading Borough Judge of Elections	Berks County
David Kurzweg	Cumru Township Judge of Elections	Berks County
Joseph Reeves	City of Reading Inspector of Elections	Berks County
Julia Zion	Maxatawny Township Judge of Elections	Berks County
Stuart Chen-Hayes	Newtown Township Judge of Elections	Bucks County
Paul Notwick	Bristol Township Judge of Elections	Bucks County
Dave Ochmanowicz	Quakertown Community School Board	Bucks County
Michael Bagdes-Canning	Mayor of Cherry Valley	Butler County
William Pilkonis	Scranton Judge of Elections	Lackawanna County
Tim Runkle	Elizabethtown Judge of Elections	Lancaster County
Cem Zeytinoglu	Stroudsburg School Board	Monroe County
Kristin Combs	Philadelphia Judge of Elections	Philadelphia County
Olivia Faison	Philadelphia Inspector of Elections	Philadelphia County
Ethan Leatherbarrow	Philadelphia Judge of Elections	Philadelphia County
Kerry Foose	Lenox Township Judge of Elections	Susquehanna County
David Kennedy	Overfield Township Auditor	Wyoming County
Jay Sweeney	Falls Township Auditor	Wyoming County

== History ==
=== Presidential elections ===
Since 1996, the national Green Party has run a candidate for president of the United States. In 2000, the Green Party of Pennsylvania placed Ralph Nader, the nominee of the Green Party of the United States, on the statewide presidential ballot. The highest vote total came in 2000, when Nader received over 103,000 votes. The lowest vote total came in 2008, when Cynthia McKinney was the nominee. Her campaign received only 71 votes. Nader, who was also on the ballot as an independent candidate, received more than 42,000 votes.

Green Party presidential nominees and votes received in Pennsylvania
Year	Nominee	Votes (percentage)
2000	Ralph Nader	103,392 (2.10%)
2004	David Cobb	6,319 (0.10%)
2008	Cynthia McKinney	71 (<0.01%)
2012	Jill Stein	21,341 (0.37%)
2016	Jill Stein	49,941 (0.81%)
2020	Howie Hawkins	1,282 (0.02%)
2024	Jill Stein	34,538 (0.49%)

=== 2006 United States Senate election ===
In 2006 the Green Party attempted to run Carl Romanelli for the 2006 United States Senate election in Pennsylvania. However, Romanelli was removed from the ballot by Judge James R. Kelley due to insufficient valid signatures on his nominating petition.

=== 2014 state and federal elections ===
In 2014, the party nominated Paul Glover for governor of Pennsylvania.

=== 2016 presidential election and election audit lawsuit ===
Dr. Jill Stein was again the party's candidate for president in 2016. Following the election, the Stein campaign filed in Pennsylvania court for a recount, citing insecure electronic voting systems and the lack of paper audit trail. The request was later denied by a federal judge.

=== 2017 elections and lawsuit ===
In 2017, the previous 2012 Green Party vice presidential candidate Cheri Honkala was nominated for Pennsylvania State Representative in District 197 in Philadelphia for the special election to be held in March 2017.

Shortly after the election, Honkala and the Green Party of Pennsylvania filed a federal lawsuit alleging voter intimidation and election fraud during the special election and calling for a new election to be held. In April 2018, one official was sentenced to probation for one year due to election misconduct, with the remaining defendants awaiting trial in early May 2018.

In 2017, Jules Mermelstein was the nominee for the Superior Court of Pennsylvania. He received 106,969 votes in the general election, and 1.4% of the vote in a nine-way race with four candidates elected. A number of other candidates also ran for local positions including mayor, township council, and school board.

=== 2018 state and federal elections ===
In 2018, Paul Glover was nominated for governor of Pennsylvania once again.

Jocolyn Bowser-Bostick was the party nominee for lieutenant governor of Pennsylvania.

Neal Gale was the party nominee for US Senate.

Brianna Johnston was the party nominee for US Congress in PA-07 (Special Election)

Three other candidates were also endorsed for state office.

=== 2020 state and federal elections and ballot access lawsuit due to COVID-19 ===
In 2020, Timothy Runkle was nominated for state treasurer, Olivia Faison was nominated for auditor general, and Richard L. Weiss, Esq., was nominated for attorney general. Several candidates for state legislative offices were also endorsed.

On May 15, 2020, the party filed suit in the US Court for the Eastern District of Pennsylvania, demanding relief from unconstitutional election laws alleged to be impossible to meet under emergency Coronavirus disease 2019 (COVID-19) measures declared by Governor Tom Wolf.

=== 2024 U.S. presidential, U.S. Senate, and PA State Attorney General elections ===
In 2024, registered Green party members residing in Pennsylvania were invited to vote in the GPPA presidential primary. Voting took place over a two-week period. Members were able to cast votes electronically or by postal mail; members who desired to write in a candidate were given the option to do so by postal mail. Jill Stein and Jasmine Sherman were the winners of the primary, with Stein earning ten delegates and Sherman earning three delegates. Jorge Zavala and write-in candidates did not earn any delegates.

Pike County small business owner Leila Hazou was nominated by consensus to run for U.S. Senate. Hazou decided to run for U.S. Senate after confronting Sen. Bob Casey on his support for the U.S.-supported Israeli army. She confirmed to Casey, "I am a Palestinian woman, and that's why I'll be running against you in this election. You'll see an Arab woman's name on the ballot."

Allegheny County lawyer Richard Weiss was nominated by consensus to run for PA state Attorney General. Weiss' platform included supporting criminal justice reforms that ended cash bail, decriminalized drug use and sex work, and established citizens' police review boards with strong police professionalism standards.
