= Pennsylvania Route 124 =

State highway in York County, Pennsylvania, US

Pennsylvania Route 124

Route information
- Maintained by PennDOT
- Length: 12.790 mi (20.584 km)
- Existed: 1928–present

Major junctions
- West end: East Prospect Street in York
- I-83 near York; PA 24 near York
- East end: PA 425 / PA 624 in Lower Windsor Township

Location
- Country: United States
- State: Pennsylvania
- Counties: York

Highway system
- Pennsylvania State Route System; Interstate; US; State; Scenic; Legislative
← PA 123	→ PA 125
← PA 922	PA 923	→ PA 924

Pennsylvania Route 124 (PA 124) is a 12.8-mile-long (20.6 km) state route in York County in south central Pennsylvania. The western terminus of the route is at the eastern border of York, where the road continues west as East Prospect Street towards PA 74. Its eastern terminus is at PA 425 and PA 624 in the Lower Windsor Township community of Craley, where PA 124 continues south as PA 425. PA 124 heads east from its beginning through suburban areas to the east of York, intersecting Interstate 83 (I-83) and PA 24. Farther east, the route heads through rural land in eastern York County to East Prospect, where it turns south and comes to its terminus.

PA 124 was designated in 1928 to run from PA 74 in York east to U.S. Route 222 (US 222) in Lancaster. The route ran east to Craley before it continued southeast to the York Furnace area, where it crossed the Susquehanna River. From here, PA 124 continued northeast through Lancaster County along Pequea Boulevard, Marticville Road, Penn Grant Road, and New Danville Pike to Lancaster. PA 923 was designated in 1930 as a short spur of PA 124 heading south into York Furnace. In 1937, PA 124 was rerouted to head south from York Furnace to PA 851 in Fawn Grove, replacing all of PA 923 and the section of PA 851 between PA 74 in Airville and Woodbine. Most of former alignment of PA 124 in Lancaster County became an extended PA 324, with New Danville Pike south of New Danville becoming an extended PA 922 and Penn Grant Road becoming unnumbered. The east end of PA 124 was truncated to PA 624 in Craley in the 1960s, with PA 425 designated onto the former alignment between Fawn Grove and Craley. The west end of PA 124 was cut back from PA 74 to the east end of York in the 2000s, with a block of the former route leading to PA 74 turned into a pedestrian walkway.

== Route description ==
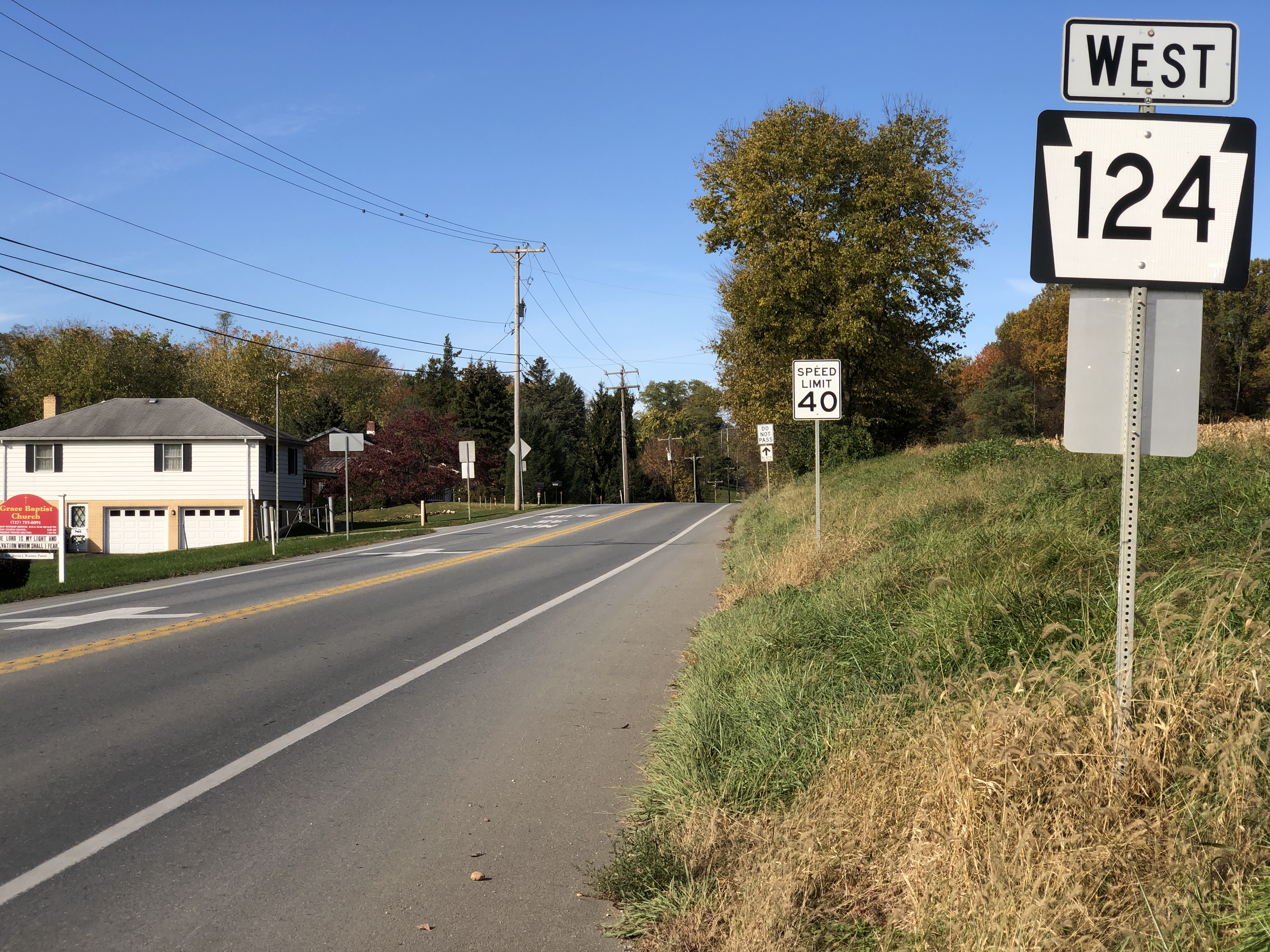
PA 124 westbound in Windsor Township

PA 124 begins along two-lane undivided East Prospect Street just east of South Sherman Street in a residential area in the eastern part of the city of York in York County. From the western terminus, East Prospect Street continues west as a city street to East College Avenue, which leads to an intersection with PA 74 (South Queen Street). A short distance after beginning, PA 124 makes a turn southeast to become Mount Rose Avenue, leaving York for Spring Garden Township. The road heads past a mix of homes and businesses in the community of Manor Hill. The route bends east and passes between and industrial areas to the north and a cemetery to the south before it runs past more residences. PA 124 crosses the Mill Creek into Springettsbury Township and widens to a four-lane divided highway, reaching an interchange with I-83. Past this interchange, the route passes businesses before becoming a four-lane undivided road and heading through suburban residential areas. The road narrows to two lanes and continues past homes and businesses, soon gaining a center left-turn lane. The route crosses into York Township and becomes East Prospect Road, passing through the community of Tilden. PA 124 reaches an intersection with PA 24 in the community of Longstown, at which point it enters Windsor Township.

Past PA 24, the route becomes two lanes and runs past suburban residential neighborhoods. The road heads into less dense areas of homes with some trees and fields, curving southeast before turning back to the east. PA 124 heads into farmland with some wooded areas and residences, passing through the community of Golden. The route curves northeast and runs through more rural land, bending east and crossing the Kreutz Creek into Lower Windsor Township. The road crosses Mt. Pisgah Road, which heads north to the borough of Yorkana. PA 124 passes through more agricultural land with some homes, heading through the community of Delroy. The route continues through rural areas, heading southeast before curving to the east. The road heads northeast and crosses into the borough of East Prospect. Here, PA 124 becomes West Maple Street and passes homes, turning southeast onto South Main Street in the center of the borough. The road runs past more residences and a few businesses before it leaves East Prospect for Lower Windsor Township again. The route becomes Abels Road and heads south through a mix of farmland, woodland, and homes. The road turns to the southwest before it curves to the southeast as it continues through rural land. PA 124 continues southeast to the community of Craley and reaches its eastern terminus at PA 624, where the road continues southeast as PA 425.

== History ==
Pennsylvania Route 923
- Location: York Furnace
- Existed: 1930–1937

When Pennsylvania legislated routes in 1911, what is now PA 124 was not given a number. PA 124 was designated in 1928 to run from PA 74 in York east to US 222 in Lancaster. The route followed its current alignment between York and Craley before it continued southeast along New Bridgeville Road and Furnace Road to just north of York Furnace. Here, the route crossed the Susquehanna River into Lancaster County. PA 124 continued northeast along Pequea Boulevard, Marticville Road, Penn Grant Road, and New Danville Pike to Lancaster. Upon designation, PA 124 was paved between York and Craley and between Martic Forge and Lancaster while the section between Craley and Martic Forge was unpaved. By 1930, the section of PA 124 between Craley and New Bridgeville was under construction. In addition, PA 923 was designated along a short unpaved road leading south from PA 124 into York Furnace.

PA 124 eastbound in East York

In 1937, PA 124 was rerouted to head south from York Furnace to PA 851 in Fawn Grove. The route replaced PA 923 south into York Furnace along with the section of PA 851 between PA 74 in Airville and Woodbine. The former alignment of PA 124 in Lancaster County became an extended PA 324 between the river and the intersection of Marticville Road and Penn Grant Road and between New Danville and Lancaster, a northern extension of PA 922 along New Danville Pike to the south of New Danville, and unnumbered along Penn Grant Road. The entire length of PA 124 was paved in the 1930s except for a short stretch to the south of Woodbine, with a section of road to the east of York widened into a multilane highway. The unpaved section of the route south of Woodbine was paved in the 1940s. In the 1960s, the eastern terminus of PA 124 was cut back to PA 624 in Craley, with the former section between Fawn Grove and Craley becoming PA 425. In the late 2000s, the west end of PA 124 was cut back from PA 74 to its current location, with the section of East Prospect Street between PA 74 (South Queen Street) and Susquehanna Avenue turned into a pedestrian walkway.

== Major intersections ==
The entire route is in York County.

Location	mi	km	Destinations	Notes
York	0.000	0.000	East Prospect Street	Western terminus
Springettsbury Township	1.283	2.065	I-83 – Harrisburg, Baltimore	Exit 18 (I-83)
York–Windsor township line	2.633	4.237	PA 24 (Edgewood Road / Windsor Road) – Mount Wolf, Red Lion	
Lower Windsor Township	12.790	20.584	PA 624 (Craley Road) – Wrightsville, Red Lion PA 425 south (New Bridgeville Road) – New Bridgeville, Indian Steps	Eastern terminus; northern terminus of PA 425
1.000 mi = 1.609 km; 1.000 km = 0.621 mi
