= Pennsylvania Route 425 =

State highway in York County, Pennsylvania, US

Pennsylvania Route 425

Route information
- Maintained by PennDOT
- Length: 24.608 mi (39.603 km)

Major junctions
- South end: PA 851 in Fawn Grove
- PA 74 in Lower Chanceford Township
- North end: PA 124 / PA 624 near East Prospect

Location
- Country: United States
- State: Pennsylvania
- Counties: York

Highway system
- Pennsylvania State Route System; Interstate; US; State; Scenic; Legislative
← PA 424	→ PA 426

Pennsylvania Route 425 (PA 425) is an 24-mile-long (39 km) state highway located in York County in Pennsylvania. The southern terminus is at PA 851 in Fawn Grove. The northern terminus is at PA 124/PA 624 in Craley. PA 425 is a two-lane undivided road that runs through rural areas in southeastern York County. The route heads north from Fawn Grove and passes through Woodbine before it forms a concurrency with PA 74 in Airville. From here, PA 425 heads northeast to York Furnace, where it briefly follows the west bank of the Susquehanna River before heading northwest away from the river. The route continues west to New Bridgeville, where it turns north and curves west to continue to its terminus in Craley.

In 1928, the road between Woodbine and PA 74 in Airville was designated PA 851 while PA 124 was designated onto the road between north of York Furnace and Craley. PA 923 was designated in 1930 as a short spur from PA 124 south to York Furnace. In 1937, PA 124 was rerouted to head south from York Furnace to PA 851 in Fawn Grove, replacing all of PA 923 along with the alignment of PA 851 between Woodbine and Airville. PA 425 was designated in the 1960s to replace the stretch of PA 124 between PA 851 in Fawn Grove and PA 624 in Craley, with the eastern terminus of PA 124 cut back to Craley.

== Route description ==
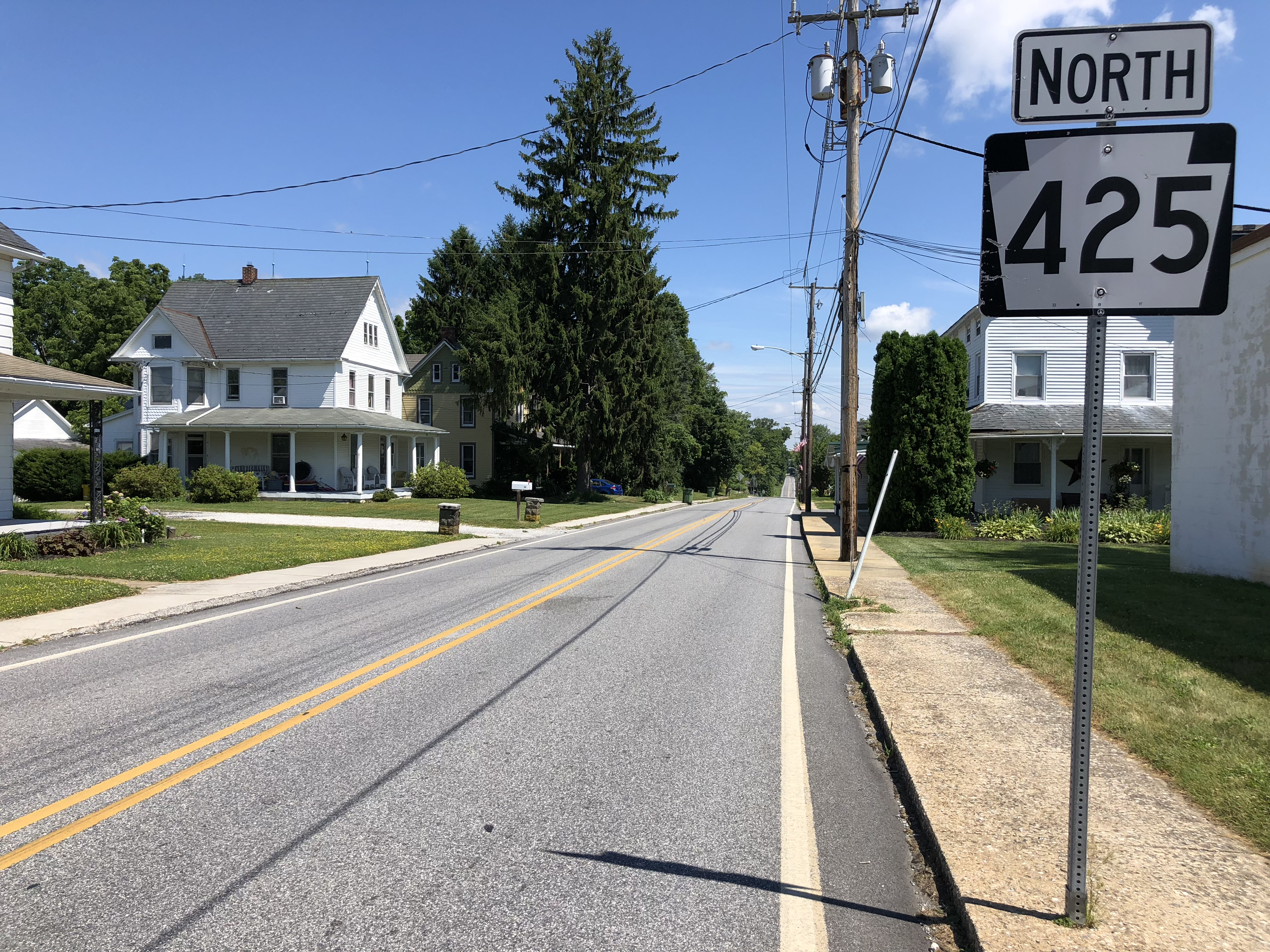
PA 425 northbound past southern terminus at PA 851 in Fawn Grove

PA 425 begins at an intersection with PA 851 in the borough of Fawn Grove in York County, heading north on two-lane undivided North Market Street. Upon beginning, the route is lined with homes before it runs through a mix of fields and residences. PA 425 leaves Fawn Grove for Fawn Township as it turns northeast onto West Woodbine Road, running through farmland with some woods and homes. The road winds northeast and then north through forested areas along the banks of Bald Eagle Creek. The route passes through the community of Bald Eagle and heads northeast through a mix of farm fields and woods, making a sharp bend to the southeast. PA 425 turns northeast and follows Woodbine Road through rural land, curving north and then northeast to reach the community of Woodbine. Here, the road crosses the Muddy Creek into Lower Chanceford Township and heads north into farmland with some trees and homes. PA 425 curves to the northwest and continues through agricultural areas, making a turn to the northeast at an intersection with Frosty Hill Road. The route continues to the community of Airville, where it passes homes and comes to an intersection with PA 74.

At this point, PA 425 turns east for a concurrency with PA 74 along Delta Road, passing residences and businesses before curving southeast into farmland. PA 425 splits from PA 74 by turning northeast onto Furnace Road, heading into agricultural areas with some trees and homes. The road curves to the north and runs through more rural land. Farther along, the route winds northeast before heading back to the north. PA 425 heads into forested areas and winds northeast through hilly terrain before curving to the southeast and then making a hairpin turn to the north at the intersection with Indian Steps Road in the community of York Furnace. At this point, the road runs along the west bank of the Susquehanna River, passing to the east of a campground. The route continues through dense forests and winds northwest away from the river through more hilly terrain. PA 425 crosses into Chanceford Township and winds through more woods before heading west into farmland with some trees and homes. The road bends to the northwest as it continues through rural areas, eventually curving to the west. PA 425 reaches the community of New Bridgeville, where it turns north onto New Bridgeville Road. The route runs through a mix of farm fields and woodland with some residences, curving to the northeast. The road turns northwest and crosses Fishing Creek into Lower Windsor Township, where it winds through forested areas with some homes. The route heads west and reaches the community of Craley, where it passes residences and a few businesses and curves to the northwest. PA 425 reaches its northern terminus at an intersection with PA 624, where the road continues northwest as PA 124.

== History ==
When routes were first legislated in Pennsylvania in 1911, what is now PA 425 was not given a number. In 1928, PA 851 was designated on the unpaved road between Woodbine and PA 74 in Airville. An unnumbered, unpaved road continued south from Woodbine to Fawn Grove. The same year, the unpaved section of road between north of York Furnace and Craley became a part of PA 124, which ran between York and Lancaster. In 1930, PA 923 was designated onto a short unpaved road running from PA 124 south to York Furnace. The section of PA 124 between New Bridgeville and Craley was under construction by 1930. In 1937, PA 124 was rerouted to head south from York Furnace to PA 851 in Fawn Grove. The route replaced PA 923 south into York Furnace along with the section of PA 851 between PA 74 in Airville and Woodbine. The entire length of PA 124 between Fawn Grove and Craley was paved in the 1930s except for a short stretch to the south of Woodbine. The unpaved section of the route south of Woodbine was paved in the 1940s. In the 1960s, the eastern terminus of PA 124 was cut back to PA 624 in Craley, with the former section between PA 851 in Fawn Grove and PA 624 in Craley becoming PA 425.

== Major intersections ==
The entire route is in York County.

Location	mi	km	Destinations	Notes
Fawn Grove	0.000	0.000	PA 851 (Main Street) – Delta, Stewartstown, York	Southern terminus
Lower Chanceford Township	9.467	15.236	PA 74 north (Delta Road) – Red Lion	Southern terminus of PA 74 concurrency
Lower Chanceford Township	9.637	15.509	PA 74 south (Delta Road) – Delta, Baltimore	Northern terminus of PA 74 concurrency
Lower Windsor Township	24.608	39.603	PA 624 (Craley Road) – Red Lion, Wrightsville PA 124 west (Abels Road) – East Prospect	Northern terminus; eastern terminus of PA 124
1.000 mi = 1.609 km; 1.000 km = 0.621 mi: Concurrency terminus
