= Pennsylvania Route 624 =

State highway in York County, Pennsylvania, US

Pennsylvania Route 624

Route information
- Maintained by PennDOT
- Length: 13.379 mi (21.531 km)

Major junctions
- South end: PA 24 in Red Lion
- PA 124 / PA 425 in Craley
- North end: PA 462 in Wrightsville

Location
- Country: United States
- State: Pennsylvania
- Counties: York

Highway system
- Pennsylvania State Route System; Interstate; US; State; Scenic; Legislative
| ← US 622 | → PA 625 |
| ← US 224 | PA 224 | → PA 225 |

Pennsylvania Route 624 (PA 624) is a north–south state route located in southern central Pennsylvania. Its southern terminus is at PA 24 in Red Lion. The northern terminus is at PA 462 in Wrightsville near the Columbia–Wrightsville Bridge that carries PA 462 across the Susquehanna River. PA 624 is a two-lane undivided road that runs through rural areas in eastern York County. The route heads northeast from Red Lion and passes through Windsor before it comes to an intersection with PA 124 and PA 425 in Craley. PA 624 continues northeast before it turns north and follows the western bank of the Susquehanna River to Wrightsville. PA 224 was originally designated in 1928 to run from Red Lion north to U.S. Route 30 (US 30, now PA 462) in Wrightsville. The route was extended south to PA 24/PA 74 in Red Lion by 1930. In the 1930s, PA 224 was renumbered to PA 624 to avoid confusion with US 224. The south end of PA 624 was moved to its current location in the 1960s following a rerouting of PA 24.

== Route description ==
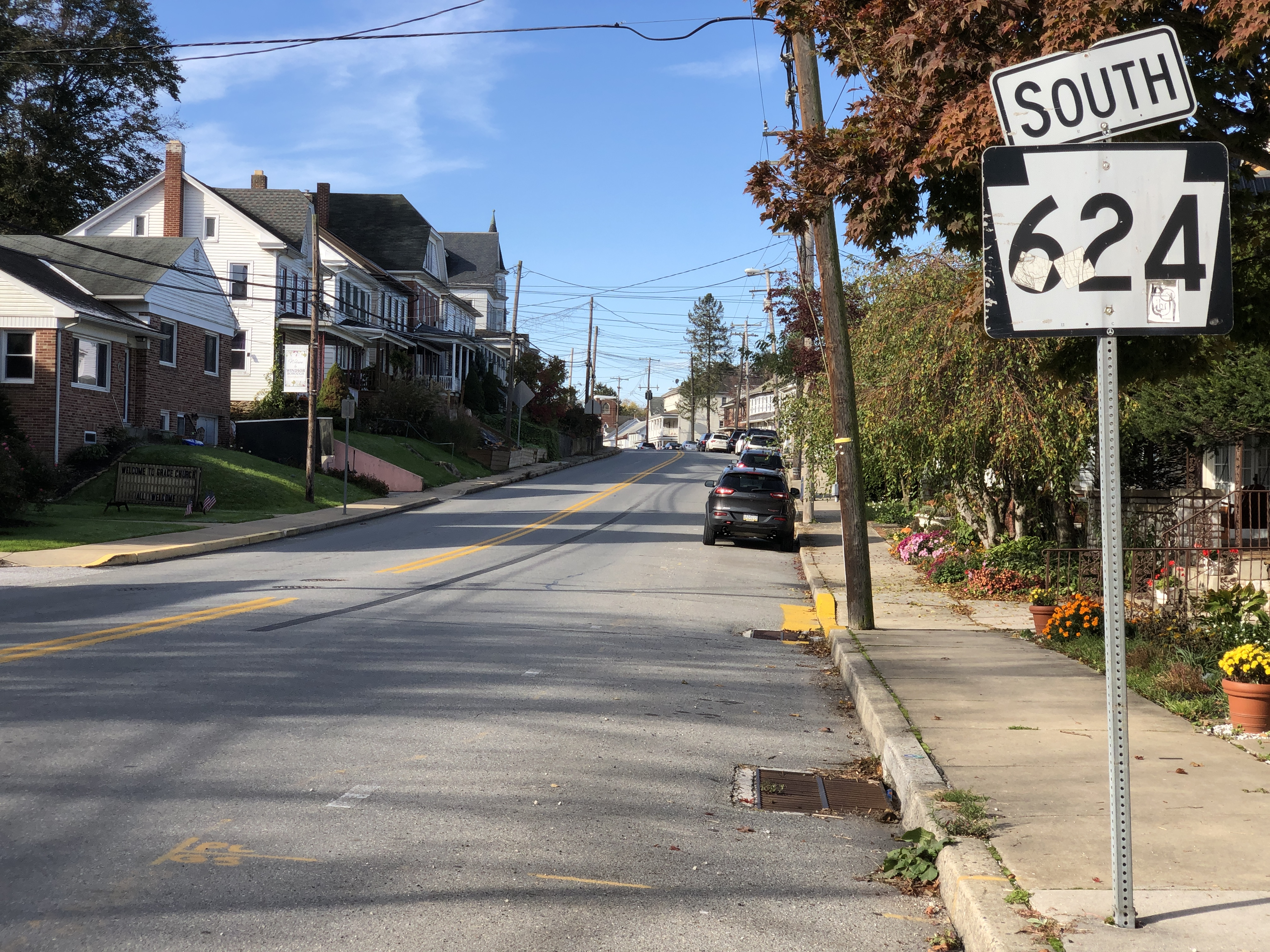
PA 624 southbound in Windsor

PA 624 begins at an intersection with PA 24 in the northern portion of the borough of Red Lion in York County. From the southern terminus, the route heads northeast on two-lane undivided East High Street, passing homes. PA 624 becomes the border between Windsor Township to the north and Red Lion to the south and the name changes to Craley Road as the road runs through wooded areas. The road fully enters Windsor Township and curves east before it enters the borough of Windsor. Here, the route becomes West Main Street and runs past homes along with a few businesses. Upon crossing Penn Street, PA 624 becomes East Main Street and passes through more developed areas. The route leaves Windsor for Windsor Township again and heads east-northeast as Craley Road, running through a mix of farmland and woodland with some homes. The road crosses into Lower Windsor Township and reaches the residential community of Bittersville, where it turns north before curving back to the northeast. PA 624 runs through wooded areas with some homes before heading into farmland, passing through the community of Martinsville. The route runs through more rural land before it comes to an intersection with the eastern terminus of PA 124 and the northern terminus of PA 425 in the community of Craley, where the road passes homes and businesses.

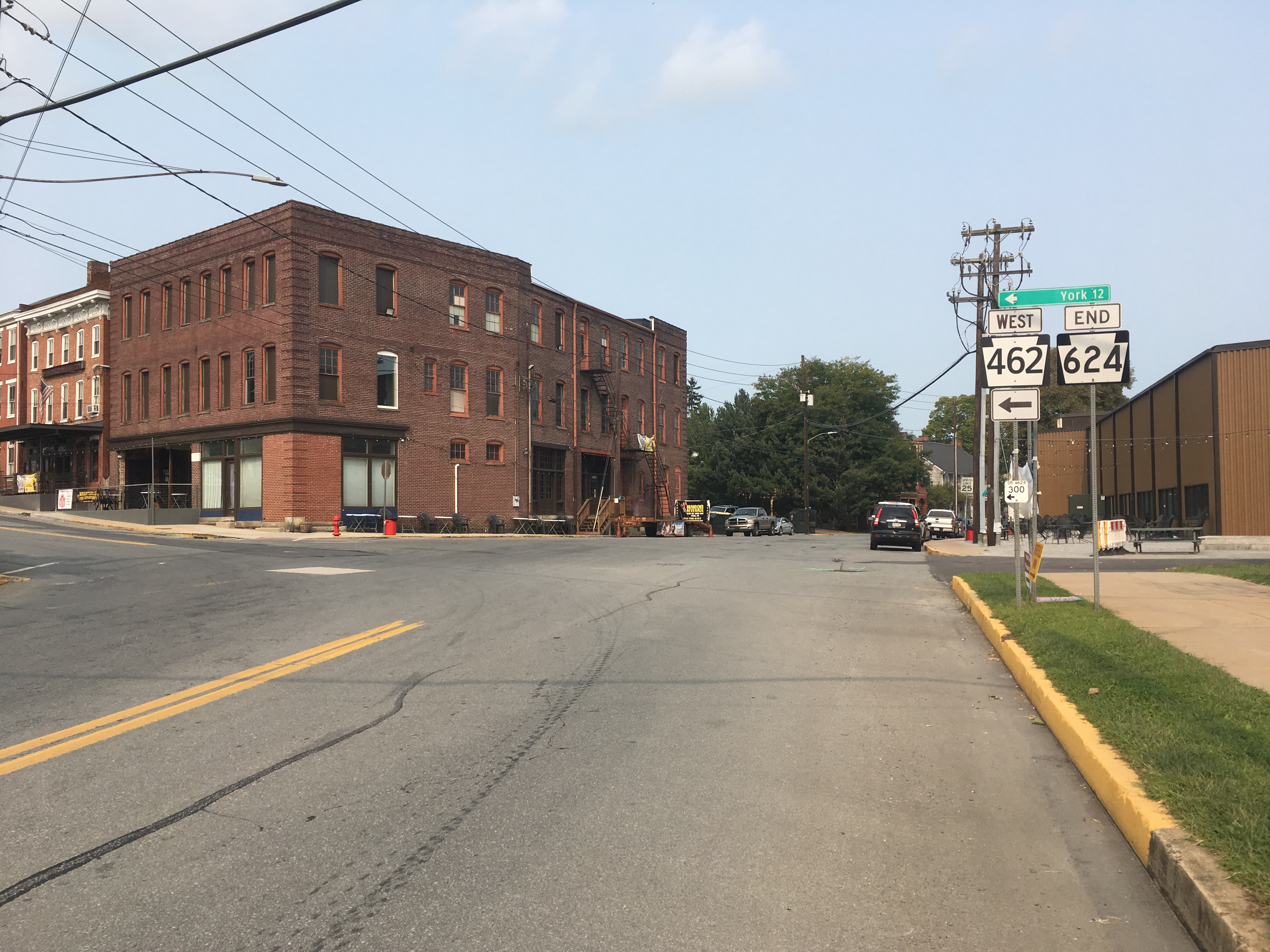
PA 624 northbound approaching its terminus at PA 462 in Wrightsville

Past the PA 124/PA 425 intersection, PA 624 heads northeast through woodland with some farm fields and residences. The route reaches the community of Long Level, where it curves north onto Long Level Road and follows the west bank of the Susquehanna River. The road runs north-northwest alongside the river through areas of homes and woods with a few businesses. PA 624 turns west away from the Susquehanna River and heads through fields with some trees, curving back to the north. The road heads into wooded areas and crosses into Hellam Township. The route continues into the borough of Wrightsville and becomes South Front Street, curving west before turning northwest and crossing the Kreutz Creek as it heads into residential areas. The road runs between homes to the west and a park along the Susquehanna River to the east before it passes under the Columbia–Wrightsville Bridge, which carries PA 462 over the river. PA 624 heads into commercial areas and turns west onto Hellam Street, passing residences and reaching its northern terminus at PA 462 at the west end of the Columbia–Wrightsville Bridge a block later. Motorists traveling from PA 624 to eastbound PA 462 are directed to follow Orange Street west and 2nd Street north to reach eastbound PA 462 at a right turn opposite the northern terminus of PA 624.

== History ==
Pennsylvania Route 224
- Location: Red Lion – Wrightsville
- Existed: 1928–1930s

When Pennsylvania first legislated routes in 1911, what is now PA 624 was not given a number. In 1928, PA 224 was designated to run from a point northeast of Red Lion north to US 30 (now PA 462) in Wrightsville along an unpaved road. By 1930, the route was extended southwest to PA 24/PA 74 in Red Lion. By this time, PA 224 was paved between Red Lion and Windsor and a short distance to the south of Wrightsville. In the 1930s, PA 224 was renumbered to PA 624 to avoid confusion with US 224, which was designated in the western part of the state. The entire length of PA 624 was paved during the 1930s. In the 1960s, the southern terminus of PA 624 was cut back to its current location at PA 24 in Red Lion, with a realigned PA 24 replacing the route south to PA 74.

== Major intersections ==
The entire route is in York County.

| Location | mi | km | Destinations | Notes |
|---|---|---|---|---|
| Red Lion | 0.000 | 0.000 | PA 24 (Main Street) | Southern terminus |
| Lower Windsor Township | 6.420 | 10.332 | PA 124 west (Abels Road) – East Prospect PA 425 south (New Bridgeville Road) – New Bridgeville, Indian Steps | Eastern terminus of PA 124; northern terminus of PA 425 |
| Wrightsville | 13.379 | 21.531 | PA 462 (Hellam Street/Columbia–Wrightsville Bridge) – York, Columbia | Northern terminus |
1.000 mi = 1.609 km; 1.000 km = 0.621 mi
