= Pennsylvania Route 851 =

State highway in York County, Pennsylvania, US

Pennsylvania Route 851

Route information
- Maintained by PennDOT
- Length: 32.592 mi (52.452 km)

Major junctions
- West end: PA 516 in Codorus Township
- PA 616 in Railroad; I-83 near Shrewsbury; PA 24 in Stewartstown; PA 425 in Fawn Grove
- East end: PA 74 in Peach Bottom Township

Location
- Country: United States
- State: Pennsylvania
- Counties: York

Highway system
- Pennsylvania State Route System; Interstate; US; State; Scenic; Legislative
← PA 850	→ PA 852

Pennsylvania Route 851 (PA 851) is a 32.6-mile-long (52.5 km) state highway located in York County, Pennsylvania. The western terminus is located at PA 516 in the Codorus Township community of Sticks. The eastern terminus is located at PA 74 in Peach Bottom Township.

PA 851 is a two-lane undivided road that runs through rural areas in southern York County a short distance to the north of the Maryland border. The route heads east from Sticks to New Freedom, where it turns north and intersects PA 616 in Railroad. PA 851 heads east through Shrewsbury and comes to an interchange with Interstate 83 (I-83). From here, the route heads east and passes through Stewartstown, where it forms a short concurrency with PA 24, and Fawn Grove, where it intersects PA 425, before continuing to its terminus. PA 851 has a truck route, PA 851 Truck, which bypasses the stretch between New Freedom and Shrewsbury.

PA 851 was designated in 1928 to run from Woodbine north to PA 74 in Airville. In 1937, PA 851 was realigned to run from U.S. Route 111 (US 111) at Main Street in Shrewsbury east to PA 74 north of Delta, with the former alignment between Woodbine and Airville becoming an extension of PA 124 (now PA 425). The same year, the road between Sticks and New Freedom became an extended PA 516 while the road between New Freedom and Railroad became an extended PA 616. PA 516 was extended east to I-83/US 111 east of Shrewsbury in the 1950s, replacing PA 616 between New Freedom and Railroad and cutting the west end of PA 851 back to the interchange. PA 851 was extended west to PA 516 in Sticks in the 1960s, replacing the part of PA 516 between Sticks and I-83. A roundabout was constructed at PA 74 in 2008.

== Route description ==
PA 851 begins at an intersection with PA 516 just south of PA 216 in the community of Sticks in Codorus Township, York County, heading southeast on Steltz Road. The road winds southeast through farmland with some woods and homes, eventually bending to the south. The route turns east to remain along Steltz Road and runs a short distance to the north of the Maryland border, passing through the community of Steitz and crossing into Shrewsbury Township. PA 851 turns northeast away from the state line and continues through a mix of farm fields and woodland with occasional residences. The road curves east and then southeast before it makes a sharp turn to the northeast.

The route becomes the border between Shrewsbury Township to the west and the borough of New Freedom to the east, passing between farmland to the west and residential neighborhoods to the east. PA 851 curves east to fully enter New Freedom and turns southeast onto West Main Street, passing a mix of homes and businesses. The route turns northeast onto North 2nd Street, with PA 851 Truck continuing east along West Main Street, and continues through residential areas. The road curves north into wooded areas and runs to the west of Old Mill Creek, the Northern Central Railway of York tourist railroad, and the York County Heritage Rail Trail. PA 851 crosses into the borough of Railroad and becomes South Main Street, quickly turning west and then north as it runs through a mix of woods and residences. The route comes to an intersection with the southern terminus of PA 616, at which point it turns east onto East Main Street and crosses the South Branch Codorus Creek and both the Northern Central Railway of York line and the York County Heritage Rail Trail. The road continues through wooded areas with some homes before leaving Railroad for Shrewsbury Township and turning northeast through farm fields.

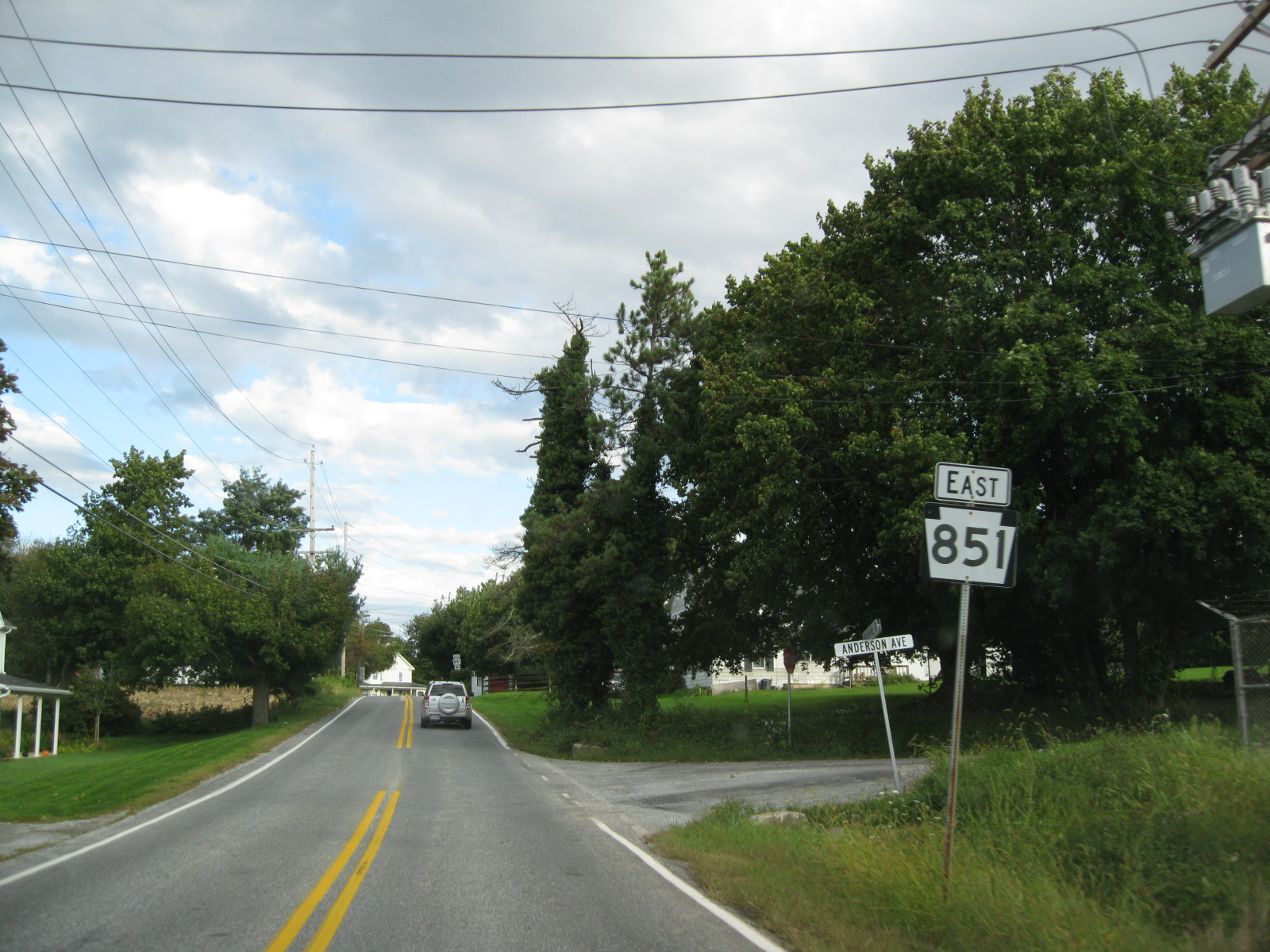
PA 851 entering New Park at Anderson Avenue

PA 851 enters the borough of Shrewsbury and becomes West Railroad Avenue, passing residences with some farmland to the south. The route turns north onto Park Avenue before heading east along West Forrest Avenue. PA 851 runs past homes and businesses in the center of Shrewsbury and crosses Main Street, where PA 851 Truck returns to the route. Past this intersection, the road becomes East Forrest Avenue and runs past more residences before gaining a center left-turn lane and heading through business areas along the border between Shrewsbury to the north and Shrewsbury Township to the south. The route fully enters Shrewsbury Township and comes to a diverging diamond interchange with I-83. Following this interchange, PA 851 runs past more commercial establishments before narrowing to two lanes and heading southeast, passing to the north of a park and ride lot. The route heads into farmland with some woods and homes parallel to Deer Creek to the northeast. The road curves east and crosses Deer Creek into Hopewell Township, continuing through rural areas with some development as Bridgeview Road. The route passes through the communities of Orwig, Reimold, and Zeigler before it runs through residential areas and heads into the borough of Stewartstown. Here, PA 851 becomes North Hill Street and heads southeast through industrial and commercial areas, crossing the Stewartstown Railroad. The route passes homes and some businesses, turning east onto West Pennsylvania Avenue and continuing to an intersection with PA 24 in the center of Stewartstown. At this point, PA 851 turns south for a concurrency with PA 24 on North Main Street for a block. PA 851 splits from PA 24 by heading east onto College Avenue, heading through residential areas.

The route leaves Stewartstown for Hopewell Township again and becomes Pleasant Valley Road, running through agricultural areas with occasional trees and homes. PA 851 curves northeast before it turns southeast onto Woolen Mill Road and winds through a mix of farmland and woodland with some homes. The road crosses the South Branch Muddy Creek into Fawn Township and continues through rural areas, curving east to pass through residential areas in the community of New Park. The route becomes West Main Street and runs through farmland with some trees and development, bending southeast as it passes south of Kennard-Dale High School and entering the borough of Fawn Grove. PA 851 runs between homes to the north and farm fields to the south before running past residences and businesses in the center of the borough, where it intersects the southern terminus of PA 425.

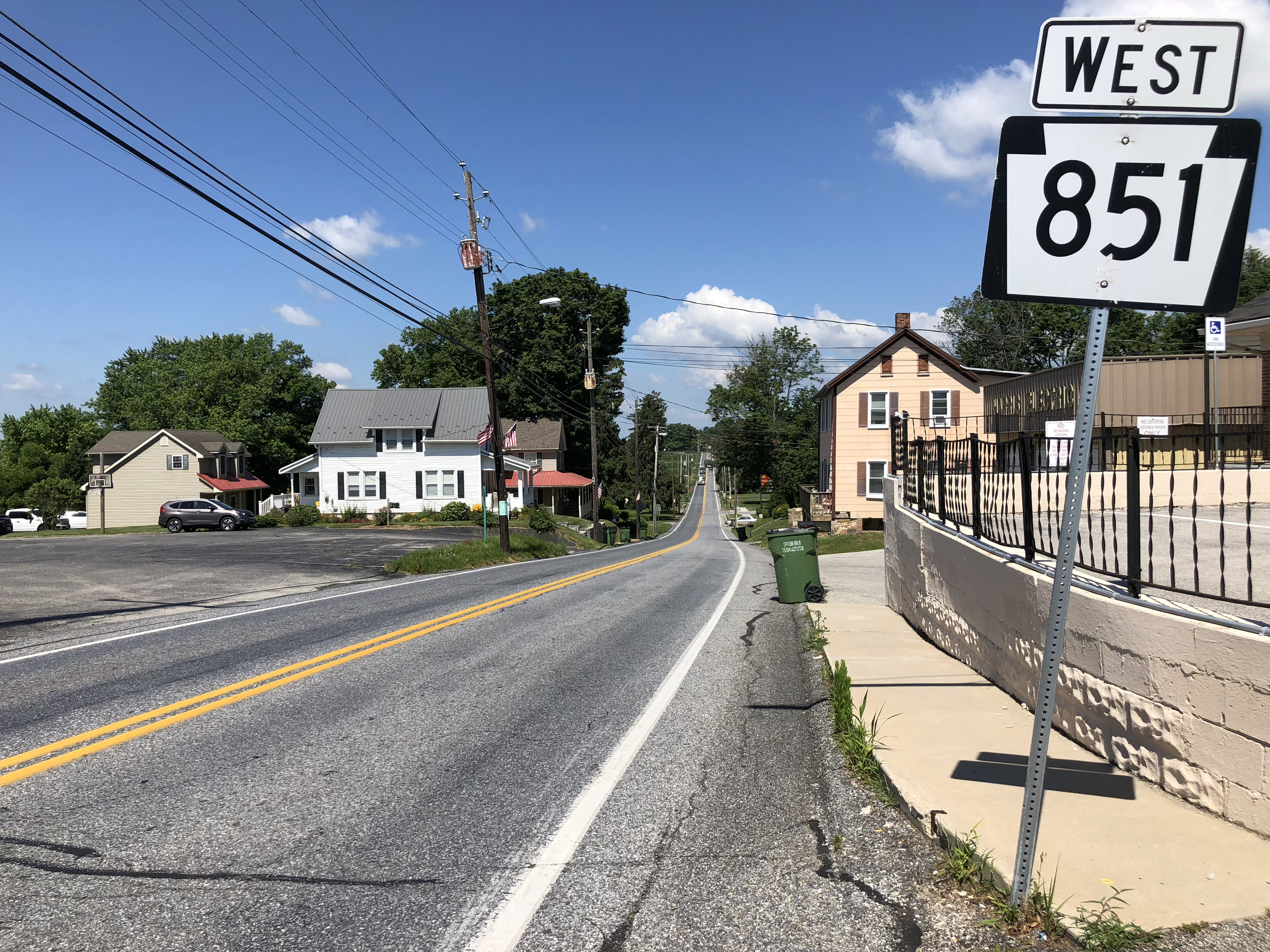
PA 851 westbound past PA 425 in Fawn Grove

At this point, the road becomes East Main Street and heads east past more homes before passing through a mix of residences and farmland. The route heads back into Fawn Township and becomes Graceton Road, heading southeast through agricultural areas with some woods and homes. The road curves east and runs immediately to the north of the Maryland border. In the community of Constitution, PA 851 turns north away from the state line onto Bryansville Road, while Graceton Road continues along the state line as State Route 2080 (SR 2080), an unsigned quadrant route, before curving into Maryland and becoming Maryland Route 624. PA 851 heads through farmland with some woods and homes and bends northeast, crossing into Peach Bottom Township. The road continues through rural land and turns to the east at the Five Forks intersection with Miller Road, Hushon Road, and Aubel Road, passing to the south of the residential development of Susquehanna Trails. The route winds east through forests before running through farm fields with some homes and passing through the community of Bryansville. The road winds northeast through forests, turning southeast in the community of Bryansville Station. PA 851 continues through fields with some development before it comes to its eastern terminus at a roundabout with PA 74, where SR 2045 (Broad Street) continues southeast towards the borough of Delta.

== History ==
When Pennsylvania legislated routes in 1911, what is now PA 851 was not given a number. PA 851 was designated in 1928 to run from Woodbine as a related route to former PA 51 (now PA 16), north to PA 74 in Airville along an unpaved road. By this time, the road between New Park and Fawn Grove was an unnumbered, paved road while the road between Fawn Grove and Constitution was an unnumbered, unpaved road.

By 1930, the road between Sticks and the Maryland border and New Freedom and Railroad were unnumbered, unpaved roads while the road between Railroad and Shrewsbury was an unnumbered, paved road. In 1937, PA 851 was rerouted to run from US 111 (Main Street) in Shrewsbury east to PA 74 north of Delta. The former alignment of the route between Woodbine and Airville became part of a southern extension of PA 124 to Fawn Grove; this road is now part of PA 425. In addition, the road between Sticks and New Freedom became an eastern extension of PA 516 while the road between New Freedom and Railroad became part of a southern extension of PA 616.

The entire length of PA 851 was paved in the 1930s except for a portion to the west of New Park. In addition, PA 516 was a paved road between Sticks and New Freedom while PA 616 was a paved road between New Freedom and Railroad. The unpaved section of PA 851 to the west of New Park was paved in the 1940s.

During the 1950s, PA 516 was extended east to an interchange with I-83/US 111 east of Shrewsbury, replacing the portion of PA 616 between New Freedom and Railroad along with PA 851 between Main Street in Shrewsbury and the interchange; the west end of PA 851 was relocated to the I-83/US 111 interchange. PA 851 was extended west to PA 516 in Sticks in 1961 in order to provide a numbered route at the interchange with I-83, replacing the portion of PA 516 between Sticks and I-83.

In May 2008, construction of a roundabout at PA 74 was completed, replacing an X-shaped intersection which saw a high number of crashes.

The interchange with I-83 near Shrewsbury was reconstructed into a diverging diamond interchange, which opened to traffic on June 28, 2021.

== Major intersections ==
The entire route is in York County.

Location	mi	km	Destinations	Notes
Codorus Township	0.000	0.000	PA 516 (Lineboro Road / Jefferson Road) – Lineboro, Spring Grove	Western terminus
New Freedom	7.513	12.091	PA 851 Truck east (Main Street) – Baltimore	Western terminus of PA 851 Truck
Railroad	9.143	14.714	PA 616 north (Main Street) – Glen Rock	Southern terminus of PA 616
Shrewsbury	10.501	16.900	PA 851 Truck west (Main Street)	Eastern terminus of PA 851 Truck
Shrewsbury Township	11.196	18.018	I-83 – Baltimore, York	Exit 4 (I-83)
Stewartstown	15.664	25.209	PA 24 north (Main Street)	Western end of PA 24 concurrency
Stewartstown	15.770	25.379	PA 24 south (Main Street)	Eastern end of PA 24 concurrency
Fawn Grove	24.679	39.717	PA 425 north (Market Street) – Gatchellville, Woodbine	Southern terminus of PA 425
Peach Bottom Township	32.592	52.452	PA 74 (Delta Road) – Red Lion, Baltimore	Roundabout; eastern terminus
1.000 mi = 1.609 km; 1.000 km = 0.621 mi: Concurrency terminus

== PA 851 Truck ==
Pennsylvania Route 851 Truck
- Location: York County, Pennsylvania
- Length: 2.959 mi (4.762 km)
- Existed: 1995–present

Pennsylvania Route 851 Truck (PA 851 Truck) is a 3.0-mile-long (4.8 km) truck route of PA 851 between New Freedom and Shrewsbury. The truck route heads southeast from PA 851 in the center of the borough of New Freedom along two-lane undivided West Main Street. The road passes homes and businesses, becoming East Main Street at the Front Street intersection and crossing the Steam into History tourist railroad and the York County Heritage Rail Trail. PA 851 Truck continues through residential areas and turns northeast onto North Constitution Avenue. The road passes near industrial buildings before it leaves New Freedom for Shrewsbury Township and runs through a mix of fields and woods. The truck route enters the borough of Shrewsbury and becomes Constitution Avenue, curving east into business areas. PA 851 Truck turns north onto South Main Street and passes homes and a few businesses, crossing the abandoned Stewartstown Railroad. The road is lined with residences as it continues into the center of Shrewsbury. Here, PA 851 Truck reaches its eastern terminus at an intersection with PA 851. PA 851 Truck was designated in 1995.
