= Sunnyburn, Pennsylvania =

Unincorporated area in Pennsylvania, US

Sunnyburn
- Unincorporated community
- Location within the state of Pennsylvania Sunnyburn (the United States)
- Coordinates: 39°48′20″N 76°22′15″W
- Country: United States
- State: Pennsylvania
- County: York
- Elevation: 679 ft (207 m)
- Time zone: UTC-5 (Eastern (EST))
  - Summer (DST): UTC-4 (EDT)
- GNIS feature ID: 1204774

Sunnyburn is an unincorporated community in Lower Chanceford Township, York County, Pennsylvania, United States. It is located on Pennsylvania Route 74, three miles south of Airville.
