= Pennsylvania Route 462 =

State highway in York and Lancaster counties in Pennsylvania, United States

Pennsylvania Route 462

Route information
- Maintained by PennDOT, City of York, and City of Lancaster
- Length: 31.889 mi (51.320 km)
- Existed: 1967–present

Major junctions
- West end: US 30 near West York
- PA 234 in West York; PA 74 in York; I-83 BL in York; I-83 near York; PA 24 near York; PA 624 in Wrightsville; PA 741 near Lancaster; US 222 / PA 272 in Lancaster; PA 340 near Lancaster
- East end: US 30 near Lancaster

Location
- Country: United States
- State: Pennsylvania
- Counties: York, Lancaster

Highway system
- Pennsylvania State Route System; Interstate; US; State; Scenic; Legislative
← PA 458	→ PA 463

Pennsylvania route 462 (PA 462) is a 32-mile-long (51 km) east–west state route in York and Lancaster counties in central Pennsylvania. The western terminus is west of York, and the eastern terminus is east of Lancaster. At both ends, PA 462 terminates at U.S. Route 30 (US 30), which follows a mostly freeway alignment parallel to the north between York and Lancaster. The route heads east into York, where it follows the one-way pair of Market Street eastbound and Philadelphia Street westbound. In York, PA 462 runs concurrent with PA 74 and crosses Interstate 83 Business (I-83 Bus.). East of York, the route becomes a multilane road that has an interchange with I-83 and crosses PA 24. PA 462 continues east through Hallam to Wrightsville and passes through that town before it crosses the Susquehanna River and runs through Columbia. East of here, the route continues through Mountville before reaching the city of Lancaster. In Lancaster, PA 462 is routed on the one-way pair of King Street eastbound and Walnut Street westbound, with the westbound direction concurrent with PA 23. The route crosses US 222/PA 272 and northbound PA 72 in Lancaster. East of Lancaster, PA 462 becomes a multilane road again and continues to its eastern terminus.

The section of the current route east of Lancaster was built as a turnpike called the Philadelphia and Lancaster Turnpike in 1794, which headed east to Philadelphia. By 1796, a road continued west from Lancaster across the Susquehanna River to York. The state took over the turnpike in the beginning of the 20th century. In 1913, the road between York and Lancaster was incorporated into the Lincoln Highway, an auto trail that ran from San Francisco east to New York City. The Lincoln Highway through Pennsylvania became PA 1 in 1924. US 30 was designated concurrent with PA 1 west of Philadelphia in 1926, with the PA 1 designation removed two years later. US 30 was widened into a multilane road between York and Lancaster in the 1930s. The route was moved to one-way pairs in Lancaster in the 1930s, following King Street eastbound and Orange Street westbound, and York in the 1950s, following Market Street eastbound and Philadelphia Street westbound. In 1967, US 30 was moved to a freeway bypass between Prospect Road east of Columbia and east of Lancaster, with the former alignment becoming PA 462. US 30 was realigned to a freeway between York and Columbia in 1972 and PA 462 was extended west along the former alignment to west of York. In the 1970s, westbound PA 462 was moved from Orange Street to Walnut Street in Lancaster.

== Route description ==
=== York to Susquehanna River ===
The western terminus of PA 462 is at a trumpet interchange with US 30 in West Manchester Township, York County, where US 30 heads east on a freeway and west on at-grade West Market Street. From this interchange, PA 462 heads northeast on four-lane divided West Market Street through commercial areas, soon narrowing to a three-lane road with a center left-turn lane. The road passes between industrial areas to the northwest and residential neighborhoods to the southeast before it crosses a York Railway line at-grade. The route runs past businesses and comes to an intersection with the eastern terminus of PA 234. PA 462 narrows to two lanes and heads east past homes, coming to a junction with the western terminus of PA 182 in the community of Kurtz Place. The road enters the borough of West York and is lined with more residences along with a few businesses. Farther east, the route becomes the border between West Manchester Township to the north and West York to the south as it passes to the south of the York Fairgrounds, crossing the York Railway tracks again at-grade. PA 462 continues into the city of York and passes residential and commercial development as a four-lane undivided road, reaching a junction with PA 74.

PA 462 eastbound in East York

At this point, PA 462 becomes concurrent with PA 74 and the road splits into a city-maintained one-way pair, with the eastbound direction following West Market Street, which is two-way and two lanes wide, and the westbound direction following West Philadelphia Street, which carries two lanes of one-way traffic westbound. The two routes follow the one-way pair through urban residential areas of rowhouses with a few businesses, with West Market Street becoming three lanes wide with two eastbound lanes and one westbound lane. PA 74/PA 462 cross over the Codorus Creek and the York County Heritage Rail Trail before intersecting a York Railway line at-grade at Pershing Avenue. Past this intersection, the routes head into the commercial downtown of York, with West Market Street carrying two lanes of eastbound traffic and West Philadelphia Street carrying two lanes of westbound traffic. PA 74/PA 462 intersects I-83 Bus. (George Street) at Continental Square eastbound and near the York County Courthouse westbound. Past this, the one-way pair becomes East Market Street eastbound and East Philadelphia Street westbound. East of downtown, PA 74 splits from PA 462 by heading south along Queen Street. PA 462 continues east through urban residential areas along the one-way pair. The route crosses a York Railway line at-grade in a commercial area before it runs northeast past more homes and a few businesses. At Harrison Street, westbound PA 462 returns to eastbound PA 462 along East Market Street.

PA 462 continues east along state-maintained, four-lane undivided East Market Street out of York into Spring Garden Township, running through wooded suburban residential areas in the community of Elmwood. The route comes to an interchange with I-83, at which point it becomes a divided highway, and enters Springettsbury Township, continuing past more homes in the community of East York as a four-lane undivided road. The road heads into business areas and widens to a divided highway as it reaches an intersection with Memory Lane/Haines Road. PA 462 passes more commercial development before it runs past homes and comes to a junction with PA 24 in the community of Yorkshire. The route continues northeast through commercial areas as a five-lane road with a center left-turn lane, narrowing to three lanes before crossing an East Penn Railroad line at-grade in the community of Stonybrook. The road runs past a mix of residential and commercial development and crosses into Hellam Township, where the name becomes Lincoln Highway. The route intersects Shoe House Road, which leads north to the Haines Shoe House. PA 462 continues past development and enters the borough of Hallam at the Kreutz Creek Road/Freysville Road intersection. The road narrows to two lanes and becomes lined with homes as it progresses east through the borough. The route leaves Hallam for Hellam Township again and gains a center left-turn lane, passing east-northeast through farmland with some trees and development. The road heads into the borough of Wrightsville at the Cool Creek Road intersection and becomes two-lane undivided Hellam Street, passing through residential areas with a few businesses. PA 462 intersects the northern terminus of PA 624 at a Y intersection and heads east onto the 1.2-mile (1.9 km) long Columbia–Wrightsville Bridge, passing over PA 624 before heading across the Susquehanna River.

=== Susquehanna River to Lancaster ===
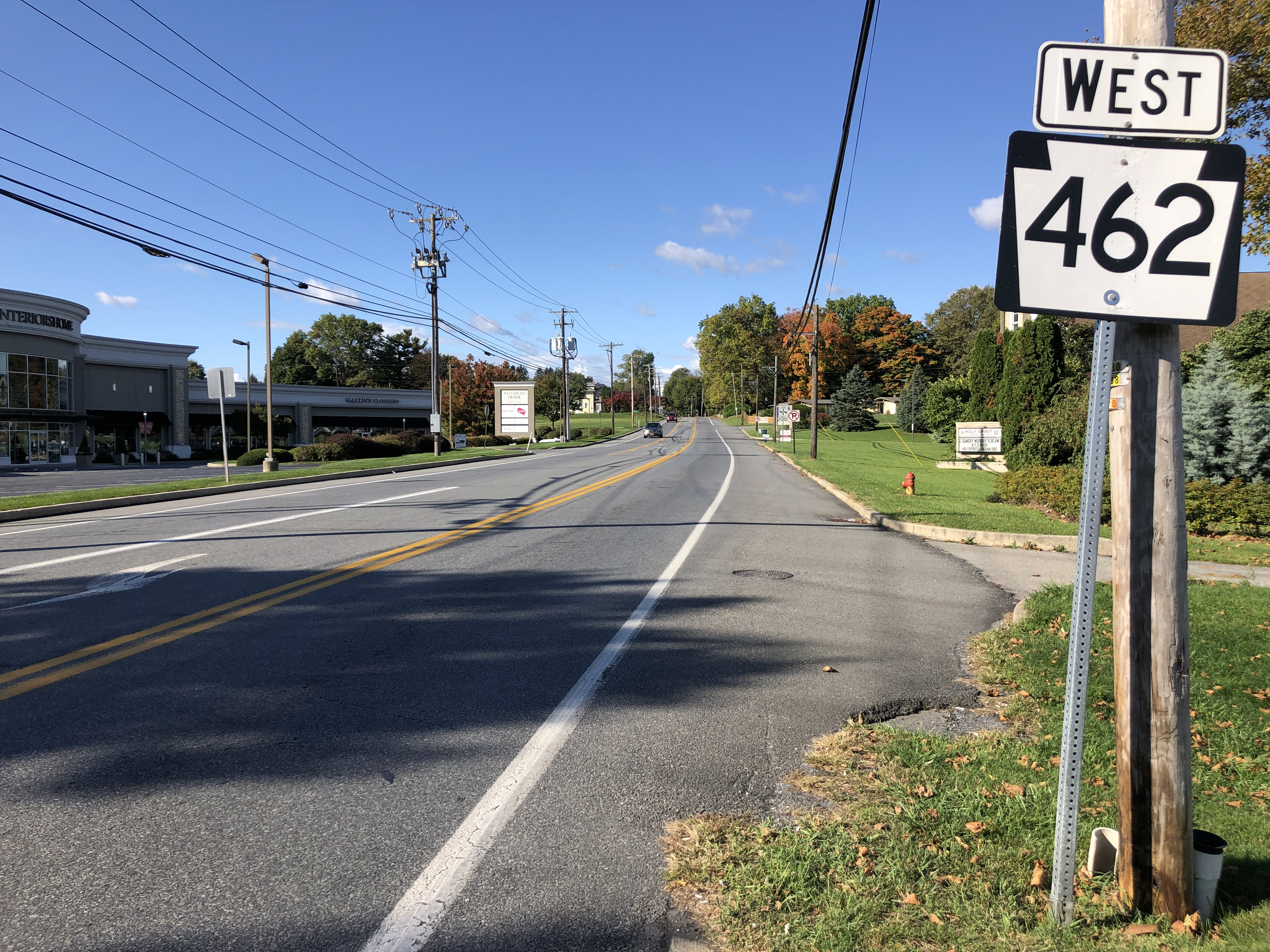
PA 462 westbound on the border of Manor and East Hempfield townships

PA 462 enters West Hempfield Township in Lancaster County as it begins crossing the river from the western bank. Upon reaching the eastern bank of the Susquehanna River, PA 462 heads into the borough of Columbia and passes over Norfolk Southern's Port Road Branch railroad line and PA 441 before descending off the Columbia–Wrightsville Bridge and heading northeast into industrial areas on Chestnut Street. The route crosses North 3rd Street, which provides access to US 30 and PA 441, and heads into residential areas, turning southeast onto North 5th Street. PA 462 continues southeast onto Lancaster Avenue and passes more homes. The road gains a center left-turn lane and runs through more residential areas with a few businesses, crossing the Columbia and Reading Railway at-grade. The route heads past more businesses and some industry to the north of the road before it leaves Columbia for West Hempfield Township, where the name becomes Columbia Avenue. PA 462 continues through a mix of farmland and residential subdivisions, curving northeast. The road intersects Prospect Road south of an interchange with the US 30 freeway and passes near residential and commercial development and some fields before it enters the borough of Mountville. The route narrows to two lanes and is lined with homes as it heads east through the borough along Main Street. PA 462 comes to a bridge over Norfolk Southern's Columbia Secondary railroad line and continues through residential areas before it leaves Mountville and becomes the border between West Hempfield Township to the north and Manor Township to the south, with the name changing back to Columbia Avenue and the center left-turn lane returning. The road passes through a mix of homes and businesses, becoming the border between East Hempfield Township to the north and Manor Township to the south. The route continues east through residential and commercial development with nearby rural land. Farther east, PA 462 passes homes before it reaches an intersection with PA 741, where it is briefly a divided highway. The road heads into business areas and regains the center left-turn lane, passing a mix of homes and businesses in the communities of Wheatland and West Lancaster. The route crosses Little Conestoga Creek into Lancaster Township and runs through wooded suburban residential neighborhoods, passing north of the WGAL television studios.

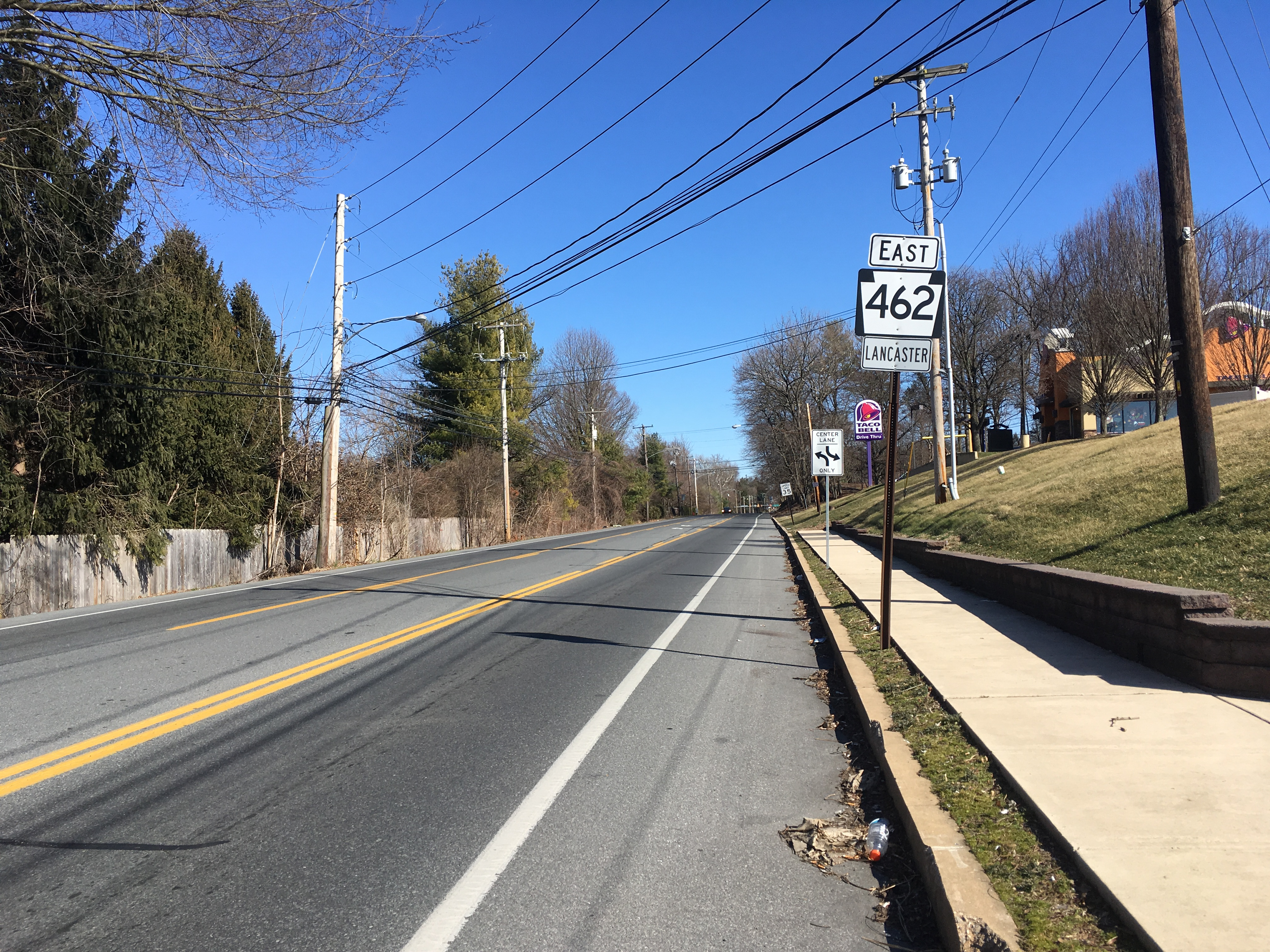
PA 462 eastbound in Lancaster Township approaching the city of Lancaster

PA 462 enters the city of Lancaster and splits into a one-way pair at Race Avenue, with the eastbound direction continuing along two-way, two-lane Columbia Avenue and the westbound direction following West Walnut Street, which carries two lanes of one-way westbound traffic concurrent with westbound PA 23. PA 23 splits from westbound PA 462 by heading west along Marietta Avenue. A few blocks later, eastbound PA 462 heads from Columbia Avenue onto West King Street, which carries two lanes of one-way traffic eastbound. Eastbound PA 462 continues along West King Street and westbound PA 23/PA 462 continues along West Walnut Street, with eastbound PA 23 following West Chestnut Street one block south of westbound PA 23/PA 462. The one-way pair continues east through urban residential areas. Eastbound PA 462 intersects the eastern terminus of PA 999 at Manor Street. The route heads into the commercial downtown of Lancaster, where it intersects one-way southbound US 222/PA 272 at Prince Street. A short distance later, PA 462 crosses one-way northbound PA 72 at Queen Street. The eastbound direction along King Street intersects Queen Street at Penn Square, where the Soldiers and Sailors Monument is located. The Central Market is located to the northwest of the square and the Lancaster County Convention Center is to the southeast of the square. Past this intersection, the route becomes East King Street eastbound and East Walnut Street westbound, with the eastbound direction passing south of the Lancaster County Courthouse west of the Duke Street intersection. The one-way pair intersects one-way northbound US 222/PA 272 at North Lime Street at the east end of downtown. Following this, PA 462 passes more homes and industrial establishments in the eastern part of the city. At North Broad Street, westbound PA 462 splits from westbound PA 23, and the two directions of PA 462 rejoin along East King Street.

PA 462 follows East King Street, a five-lane road with a center left-turn lane, out of Lancaster and back into Lancaster Township, passing through residential areas. The road loses the center turn lane as it continues east past homes. The route crosses the Conestoga River into East Lampeter Township and becomes a four-lane divided highway, heading into commercial areas and intersecting the western terminus of PA 340 in the community of Bridgeport. PA 462 becomes Lincoln Highway and turns into a four-lane road with two eastbound lane, one westbound lane, and a center left-turn lane, passing businesses before continuing through suburban residential areas. The road runs east-southeast past more suburban development and widens into a four-lane divided highway as it comes to the Strasburg Pike intersection. PA 462 passes businesses before it comes to its eastern terminus at an interchange with the eastern end of the US 30 freeway. At this point, the Lincoln Highway continues east as part of US 30.

== History ==
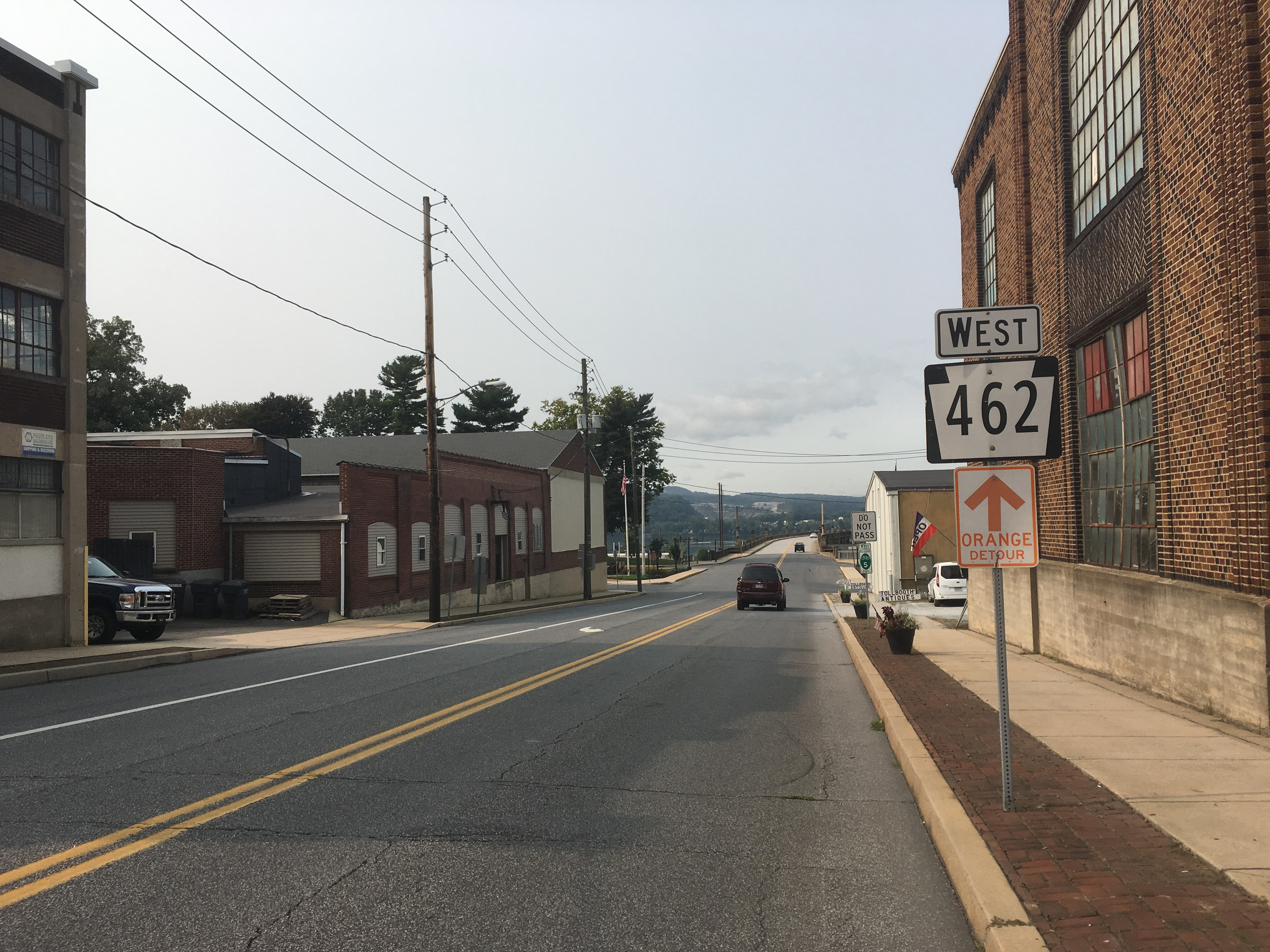
PA 462 westbound in Columbia approaching the Columbia–Wrightsville Bridge over the Susquehanna River

The section of present-day PA 462 east of Lancaster was constructed as the westernmost part of the Philadelphia and Lancaster Turnpike, a turnpike connecting Lancaster to Philadelphia. The turnpike company was incorporated in 1792 and the road was completed in 1794. The Philadelphia and Lancaster Turnpike was built with a stone and gravel surface and was the first long-distance turnpike constructed in the United States, leading to a movement to improve roads across the country. The turnpike also opened up settlement to the Northwest Territory past the Ohio River and provided cheap transportation between the coastal areas and the "bread basket" region around Lancaster. By 1796, a road continued west from Lancaster to the Susquehanna River and to York. The Lancaster and Susquehanna Turnpike was chartered to run from Lancaster to Columbia in 1794 and was built in the 1810s. By 1843, the rise of the railroads and the canals reduced the use of the Philadelphia and Lancaster Turnpike, and the road fell into disrepair and saw decreased usage through the later part of the 19th century.

The state acquired the Philadelphia and Lancaster Turnpike in the beginning of the 20th century. Following the passage of the Sproul Road Bill in 1911, current PA 462 was designated as Legislative Route 126 west of York, Legislative Route 128 between York and Lancaster, and Legislative Route 215 east of Lancaster. In 1913, this portion of road became part of the Lincoln Highway, an auto trail that ran from San Francisco east to New York City. The Lincoln Highway within Pennsylvania was designated as PA 1 in 1924. With the creation of the U.S. Highway System in 1926, US 30 was designated concurrent with PA 1 on the Lincoln Highway west of Philadelphia. The concurrent PA 1 designation was removed from US 30 in 1928.

PA 462 westbound in West Hempfield Township

US 30 originally ran along King Street through the city of Lancaster. In York, the route followed Market Street through the city. The section of US 30 to the west of York, between York and Lancaster, and to the east of Lancaster was widened to a multilane highway in the 1930s. The route was shifted to use the one-way pair of King Street eastbound and Orange Street westbound through Lancaster in the 1930s. In the 1950s, US 30 was moved to the one-way pair of Market Street eastbound and Philadelphia Street westbound through York.

In 1967, US 30 was shifted to a freeway bypass between Prospect Road east of Columbia and east of Lancaster; PA 462 was designated onto the former alignment of US 30 between those two points. In 1972, PA 462 was extended west to its current terminus at US 30 west of York after US 30 was shifted to a bypass between west of York and Columbia. In the 1970s, the route was widened to a divided highway near the PA 24 intersection. The westbound direction of PA 462 in Lancaster was shifted from Orange Street to Walnut Street, running concurrent with PA 23, in the 1970s. In York, the eastbound direction of PA 462 was originally planned to be shifted to Princess Street as part of constructing Continental Square at the intersection of Market and George streets; however, it remained along Market Street.

== Major intersections ==
County	Location	mi	km	Destinations	Notes
York	West Manchester Township	0.000	0.000	US 30 (Lincoln Highway) to I-83 – Gettysburg, Lancaster	Interchange; western terminus
York	West York	1.474	2.372	PA 234 west (East Berlin Road)	Eastern terminus of PA 234
York	West York	1.848	2.974	PA 182 east (Hokes Mill Road)	Western terminus of PA 182
York	York	3.173	5.106	PA 74 north (Carlisle Avenue) – Dover, Dillsburg	Western terminus of PA 74 concurrency
York	York	4.173	6.716	I-83 BL (George Street)	
York	York	4.473	7.199	PA 74 south (Queen Street)	Eastern terminus of PA 74 concurrency
York	Springettsbury Township	6.157	9.909	I-83 – Harrisburg, Baltimore	Exit 19 (I-83)
York	Springettsbury Township	7.953	12.799	PA 24 (Mt. Zion Road / Edgewood Road) – Mount Wolf, Red Lion	
York	Wrightsville	15.733	25.320	PA 624 south (Hellam Street) – Craley	Northern terminus of PA 624
Susquehanna River		15.796	25.421	Columbia–Wrightsville Bridge	
Lancaster	Columbia	17.209	27.695	North 3rd Street to PA 441 – Marietta, Washington Boro	
Lancaster	East Hempfield–Manor township line	24.957	40.164	PA 741 (Millersville Road / Rohrerstown Road) – East Petersburg, New Danville	
Lancaster	Lancaster	26.988	43.433	PA 23 west (Marietta Avenue)	Western terminus of PA 23 concurrency westbound
Lancaster	Lancaster	27.720	44.611	PA 999 west (Manor Street)	Eastern terminus of PA 999; access to PA 462 eastbound only
Lancaster	Lancaster	27.984	45.036	US 222 south (PA 272 south / Prince Street)	Southbound only
Lancaster	Lancaster	28.096	45.216	PA 72 north (Queen Street)	Northbound only
Lancaster	Lancaster	28.329	45.591	US 222 north (PA 272 north / Lime Street)	Northbound only
Lancaster	Lancaster	29.082	46.803	PA 23 east (East Chestnut Street / East Walnut Street)	Eastern terminus of PA 23 concurrency westbound
Lancaster	Lancaster	29.974	48.238	PA 340 east (Old Philadelphia Pike)	Western terminus of PA 340
Lancaster	East Lampeter Township	31.889	51.320	US 30 (Lincoln Highway) to PA 283 west – York, Harrisburg	Interchange; eastern terminus
1.000 mi = 1.609 km; 1.000 km = 0.621 mi: Concurrency terminus; Incomplete access
