= Pennsylvania Route 182 =

State highway in York County, Pennsylvania, US

Pennsylvania Route 182

Route information
- Maintained by PennDOT
- Length: 6.671 mi (10.736 km)
- Existed: 1961–present

Major junctions
- West end: PA 462 in West Manchester Township
- I-83 in York Township
- East end: PA 74 in Spry

Location
- Country: United States
- State: Pennsylvania
- Counties: York

Highway system
- Pennsylvania State Route System; Interstate; US; State; Scenic; Legislative
← PA 181	→ PA 183

Pennsylvania Route 182 (PA 182) is a 6.7-mile-long (10.8 km) state highway located in York County, Pennsylvania. The western terminus is at PA 462 in West York. The eastern terminus is at PA 74 in Spry. PA 182 is mostly a two-lane undivided road that runs through suburban and rural areas to the southwest of York. The route heads southeast from PA 462, turning east to come to an interchange with Interstate 83 (I-83). PA 182 continues east to its terminus at PA 74. The current alignment of the route was paved in the 1930s. PA 182 was designated in 1961, running between U.S. Route 30 (US 30, now PA 462) in West York and PA 74 in Spry.

== Route description ==
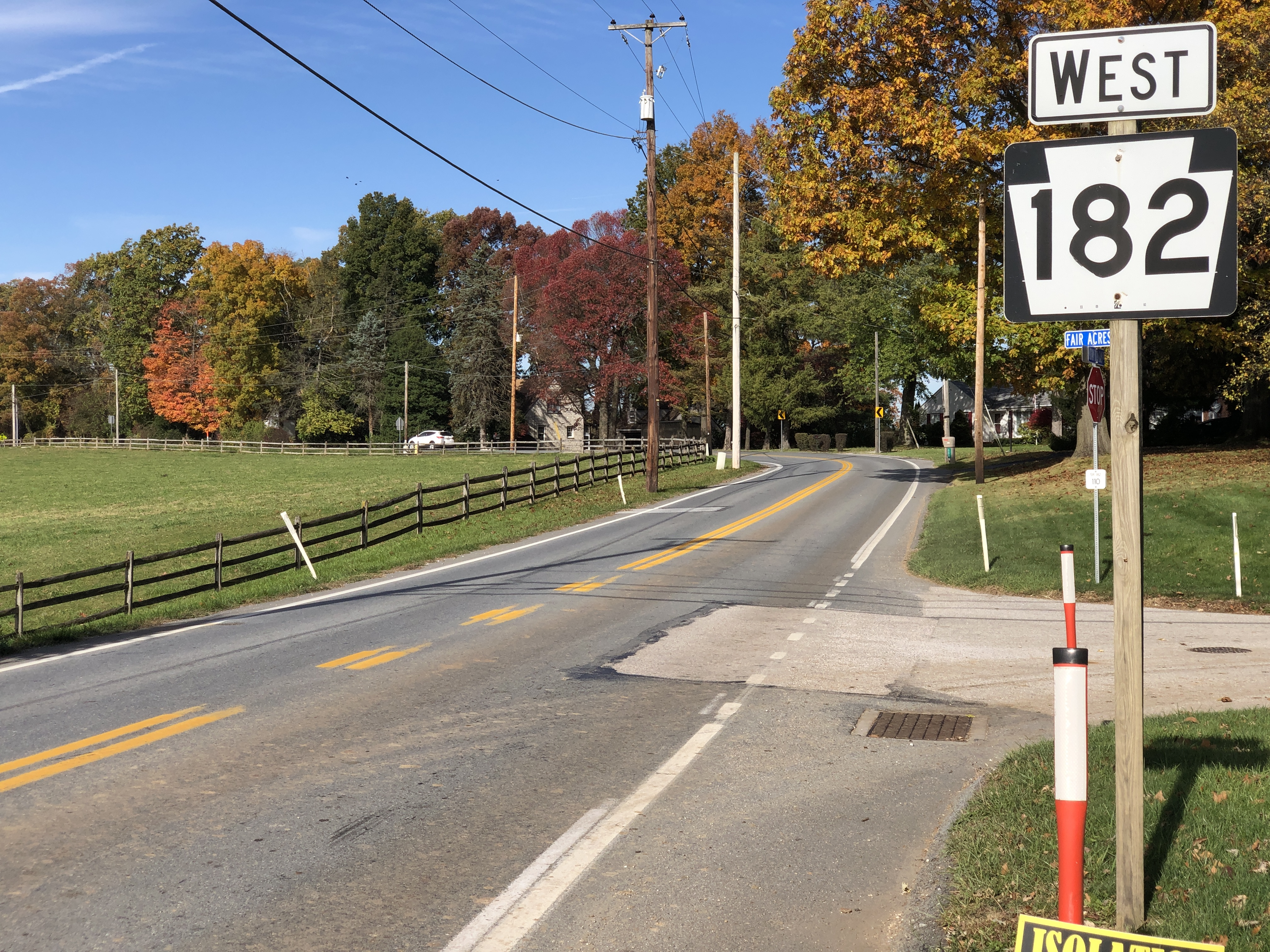
PA 182 westbound in York Township

PA 182 begins at an intersection with PA 462 near the borough of West York in West Manchester Township, heading south on two-lane undivided Hokes Mill Road. The road passes homes to the east and industrial establishments to the west, crossing two York Railway lines at-grade as it passes near a large factory. After this, the route heads southeast, passing under West College Avenue and running between farmland to the west and a quarry to the east. PA 182 heads south into a mix of farms and woods before making a turn east onto Indian Rock Dam Road. The route crosses the Codorus Creek into Spring Garden Township and makes a turn southeast, running through wooded areas to the east of the creek. After crossing the York County Heritage Rail Trail and an abandoned railroad line, PA 182 heads farther from the Codorus Creek and enters agricultural areas with some development and woods, crossing into York Township. The road winds to the east-southeast through more rural areas before entering suburban residential development and crossing George Street. At this point, the route becomes Leader Heights Road and heads east near more homes. PA 182 widens into a four-lane divided highway as it passes businesses and reaches an interchange with I-83. After this, the route becomes a three-lane road with a center left-turn lane and heads past more commercial establishments before narrowing back to two lanes and passes more residences. PA 182 reaches its eastern terminus at an intersection with PA 74 in a commercial area in the community of Spry.

== History ==
When Pennsylvania legislated routes in 1911, what is now PA 182 was not given a number. By 1926, the current alignment of the route was an unnumbered, unpaved road. The road was paved by the 1930s. PA 182 was designated to its current alignment between US 30 (now PA 462) in West York and PA 74 in Spry in 1961 in order to provide a numbered route at the interchange with I-83.

== Major intersections ==
The entire route is in York County.

Location	mi	km	Destinations	Notes
West Manchester Township	0.000	0.000	PA 462 (West Market Street)	Western terminus
York Township	5.496	8.845	I-83 – York, Baltimore	Exit 14 (I-83)
York Township	6.671	10.736	PA 74 (South Queen Street) – York, Dallastown, Red Lion	Eastern terminus
1.000 mi = 1.609 km; 1.000 km = 0.621 mi
