= Mount Royal, Pennsylvania =

Unincorporated community in Pennsylvania, U.S.

Coordinates: 40°02′21″N 76°53′16″W

Mount Royal is an unincorporated community in York County, Pennsylvania, United States. Mount Royal is located on Pennsylvania Route 74, approximately three miles north of Dover.

== Demographics ==
Historical population
| Census | Pop. | Note | %± |

The United States Census Bureau defined Mount Royal as a census designated place (CDP) in 2023.
