= Pennsylvania Route 24 =

State highway in York County, Pennsylvania, United States

Pennsylvania Route 24

Route information
- Maintained by PennDOT
- Length: 28.352 mi (45.628 km)
- Existed: 1926–present

Major junctions
- South end: MD 23 near Stewartstown
- PA 851 in Stewartstown; PA 216 in Winterstown; PA 74 in Red Lion; PA 624 in Red Lion; PA 124 in East York; PA 462 in East York; US 30 in East York
- North end: PA 921 in Mount Wolf

Location
- Country: United States
- State: Pennsylvania
- Counties: York

Highway system
- Pennsylvania State Route System; Interstate; US; State; Scenic; Legislative
← PA 23	→ PA 25

Pennsylvania Route 24 (PA 24) is a 29-mile-long (47 km) state highway located within central Pennsylvania in the York County area. Its southern terminus is at the Mason–Dixon line near Stewartstown, where PA 24 continues into Maryland as Maryland Route 23 (MD 23). The northern terminus is at PA 921 in Mount Wolf. The route heads north from the state line through rural areas in southern York County, intersecting PA 851 in Stewartstown and PA 216 in Winterstown. PA 24 continues north to Red Lion, where it crosses PA 74 and intersects the south end of PA 624. The route runs through suburban areas to the east of York, crossing PA 124, PA 462, and U.S. Route 30 (US 30). PA 24 continues north through rural land and reaches its end in Mount Wolf.

PA 24 was designated in 1928 to run from the Maryland border south of Stewartstown north to US 111 (Old York Road) in New Market. The route ran north to Red Lion, where it followed PA 74 northwest to York before running north along US 111 to North York and continuing north to York Haven, west to Lewisberry, and north to New Market. In the 1950s, the north end of PA 24 was cut back to Interstate 83 (I-83)/US 111 southwest of New Market. In York, the route was split into one-way pairs in the downtown area while US 111 Alternate (US 111 Alt.) ran concurrent with PA 24 between York and I-83/US 111 in North York. In the 1960s, PA 24 was rerouted to head north from Red Lion to US 30 (now PA 462) and PA 250 east of York. The former alignment became PA 74 by itself between Red Lion and York, I-83 Business (I-83 Bus.) between York and I-83 in North York, PA 181 between PA 250 (now US 30) in North York and York Haven, PA 382 between York Haven and PA 114 near Bunches, and an extended PA 114 between Bunches and New Market. PA 24 was extended north to PA 921 in Mount Wolf in the 1970s, replacing the easternmost portion of PA 250.

== Route description ==
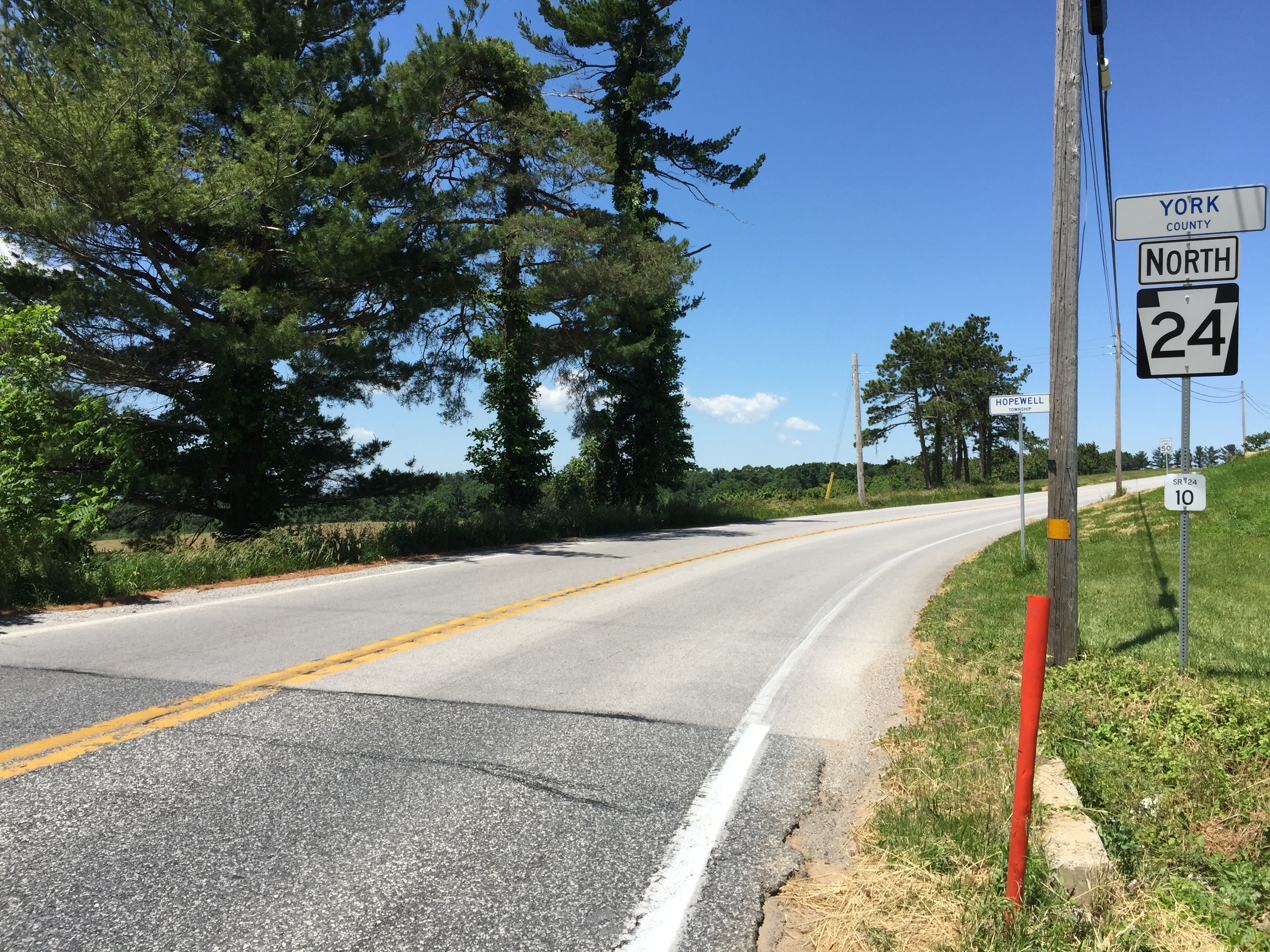
PA 24 northbound past its southern terminus at MD 23 at the Maryland border in Hopewell Township

PA 24 begins at the Maryland border in Hopewell Township, where the road continues into Maryland as MD 23. From the state line, the route heads to the northwest on two-lane undivided Barrens Road South and passes through agricultural areas with scattered residences. PA 24 enters the borough of Stewartstown and becomes Main Street, heading north past homes. In the center of the borough, the route forms a short concurrency with PA 851. The road passes more residences and a few businesses before leaving Stewartstown for Hopewell Township again, becoming Barrens Road North. PA 24 continues through more open farmland with occasional patches of woods and homes. Upon passing through the community of Rinely, the route crosses into North Hopewell Township and continues northwest through more rural areas on Winterstown Road. PA 24 enters the borough of Winterstown and becomes Main Street, passing a few homes as it intersects PA 216. After this intersection, the road passes more farmland and heads back into North Hopewell Township, with the road name changing back to Winterstown Road. The route heads through more farm areas with some houses, curving to the northeast as it becomes the border between York Township to the west and Windsor Township to the east.

The road passes homes as it continues into the borough of Red Lion, where it turns north onto Main Street. PA 24 is lined with more residences as it heads northwest through Red Lion and intersects PA 74 in the center of town. Past this intersection, the route continues past a mix of homes and businesses in the downtown area, passing west of the former Red Lion station along the abandoned Maryland and Pennsylvania Railroad line and coming to the PA 624 junction. The road passes more residences before leaving Red Lion and becoming the York Township-Windsor Township border again, with the road name becoming Cape Horn Road. PA 24 passes a mix of suburban homes and businesses, running through East Yoe. The route turns more to the north as it continues through a mix of farmland and residential development. The road makes a turn northwest into suburban neighborhoods and turns north again as it comes to an intersection with PA 124 in a commercial area. Past PA 124, PA 24 continues north on Edgewood Road and enters Springettsbury Township, passing wooded residential neighborhoods. The route widens into a four-lane divided highway as it reaches the PA 462 junction.

From here, the road becomes Mount Zion Road and passes homes before running near industrial establishments, coming to a bridge over an East Penn Railroad line. After an interchange with US 30, PA 24 enters commercial areas and passes to the east of the York Galleria shopping mall. Past the mall, the route narrows back into a two-lane undivided road and heads northwest through a mix of wooded residential areas and some fields, passing through Mount Zion. PA 24 makes a turn north onto an unnamed road and crosses the Codorus Creek into Manchester Township, passing a mix of residential neighborhoods and farmland. The route passes through Starview and turns to the northwest, heading into the borough of Mount Wolf. Here, PA 24 becomes Center Street and passes homes before turning southwest onto Main Street and ending at the eastern terminus of PA 921 a short distance later.

== History ==
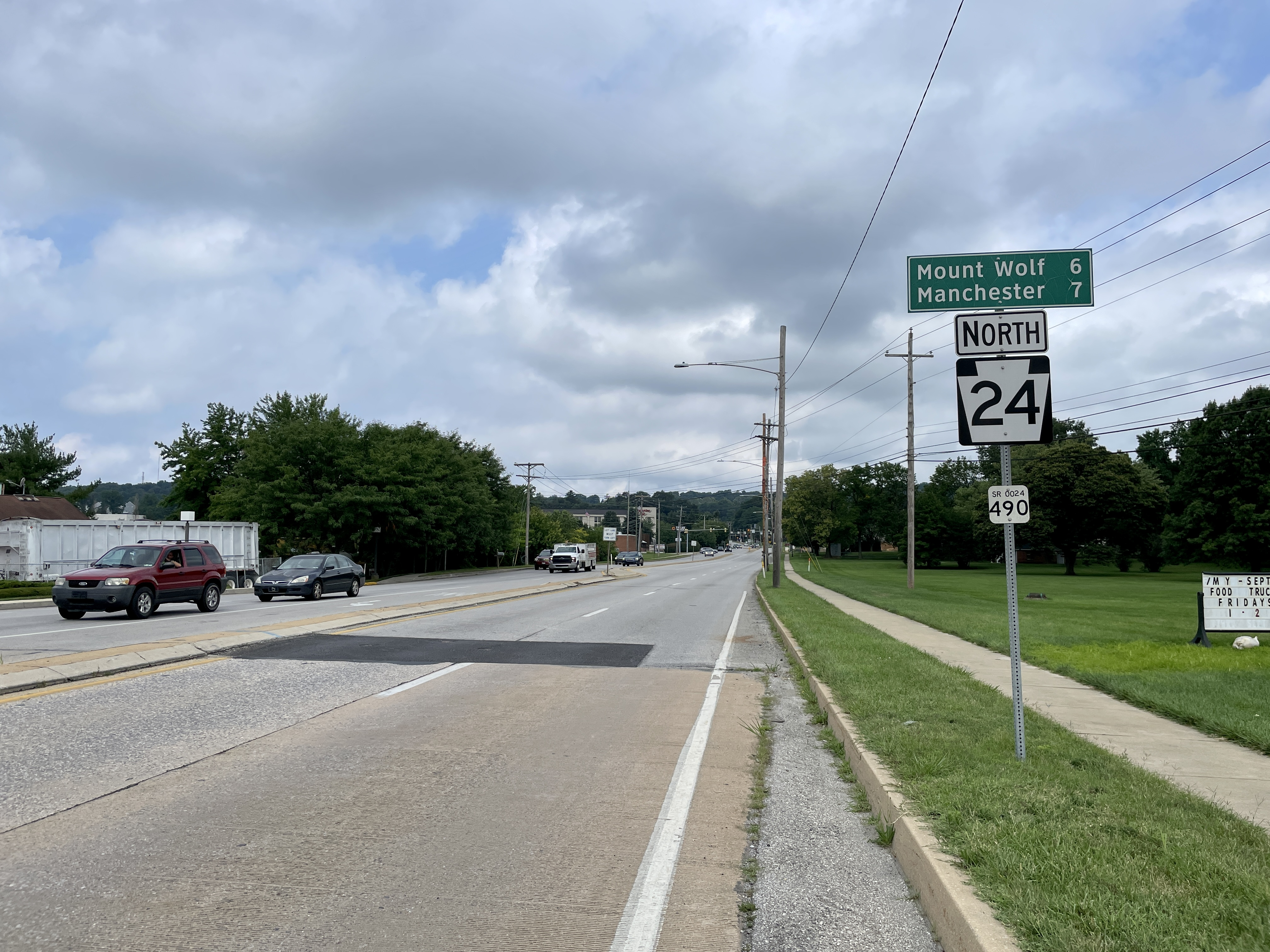
PA 24 northbound past US 30 in Springettsbury Township

When routes were first legislated in Pennsylvania in 1911, what would become PA 24 was designated as part of Legislative Route 216 between Red Lion and York and as part of Legislative Route 250 between York and New Cumberland. PA 24 was designated in 1928 to run from the Maryland border south of Stewartstown north to US 111 (Old York Road) in New Market. The route followed its current alignment to Red Lion before it ran northwest concurrent with PA 74 to York. From York, PA 24 ran north through Manchester to York Haven, where it turned west and passed through Newberrytown and Lewisberry before it curved north and continued to its terminus. Upon designation, the entire length of PA 24 was paved. In York, PA 24 entered the city from the southeast with PA 74 on Queen Street before it turned west to follow US 30 on Market Street and north to follow US 111 on George Street. The unnumbered road between Red Lion and Mount Wolf was paved in the 1930s.

In the 1950s, the northern terminus of PA 24 was cut back to an interchange with I-83/US 111 southwest of New Market. In addition, US 30/PA 24/PA 74 was moved onto the one-way pair of Market Street eastbound and Philadelphia Street westbound in York while US 111 Alt. was designated concurrent with PA 24 on George Street between US 30/PA 74 in downtown York and I-83/US 111 in North York, replacing US 111 which was realigned to follow I-83. US 111 Alt./PA 24 was routed onto the one-way pair of Duke Street northbound and George Street southbound south of North Street. In 1961, PA 24 was realigned at Red Lion to head north to US 30 (now PA 462) east of York, where PA 250 continued north before turning west onto a northern bypass of York (now US 30). The former alignment of PA 24 north of Red Lion became solely PA 74 between Red Lion and York, I-83 Bus. (which replaced US 111 Alt.) between York and I-83 in North York, PA 181 between PA 250 (now US 30) in North York and York Haven, PA 382 between York Haven and PA 114 near Bunches, and an eastern extension of PA 114 between Bunches and New Market. This change was made as part of the construction of I-83 in order to provide a numbered route at each interchange. In the 1970s, PA 24 was extended north to the eastern terminus of PA 921 in Mount Wolf, replacing the section of PA 250 between present-day PA 462 and US 30. In addition, the route was widened to a divided highway in the vicinity of the PA 462 intersection.

== Major intersections ==
The entire route is in York County.

Location	mi	km	Destinations	Notes
Hopewell Township	0.000	0.000	MD 23 south (Norrisville Road)	Maryland state line; southern terminus
Stewartstown	3.168	5.098	PA 851 east (College Avenue)	South end of concurrency
Stewartstown	3.274	5.269	PA 851 west (Pennsylvania Avenue)	North end of concurrency
Winterstown	9.362	15.067	PA 216 west (Swamp Road) – Glen Rock	Eastern terminus of PA 216
Red Lion	14.566	23.442	PA 74 (Broadway)	
Red Lion	14.746	23.731	PA 624 north (High Street)	Southern terminus of PA 624
York–Windsor township line	19.829	31.912	PA 124 (East Prospect Road) – York, East Prospect	
Springettsbury Township	21.188	34.099	PA 462 (Market Street) – York, Columbia	
Springettsbury Township	21.822	35.119	US 30 – York, Lancaster	Interchange
Mount Wolf	28.352	45.628	PA 921 west (Main Street)	Northern terminus; eastern terminus of PA 921
1.000 mi = 1.609 km; 1.000 km = 0.621 mi: Concurrency terminus
