= Winterstown, Pennsylvania =

Borough in Pennsylvania, US

- Borough
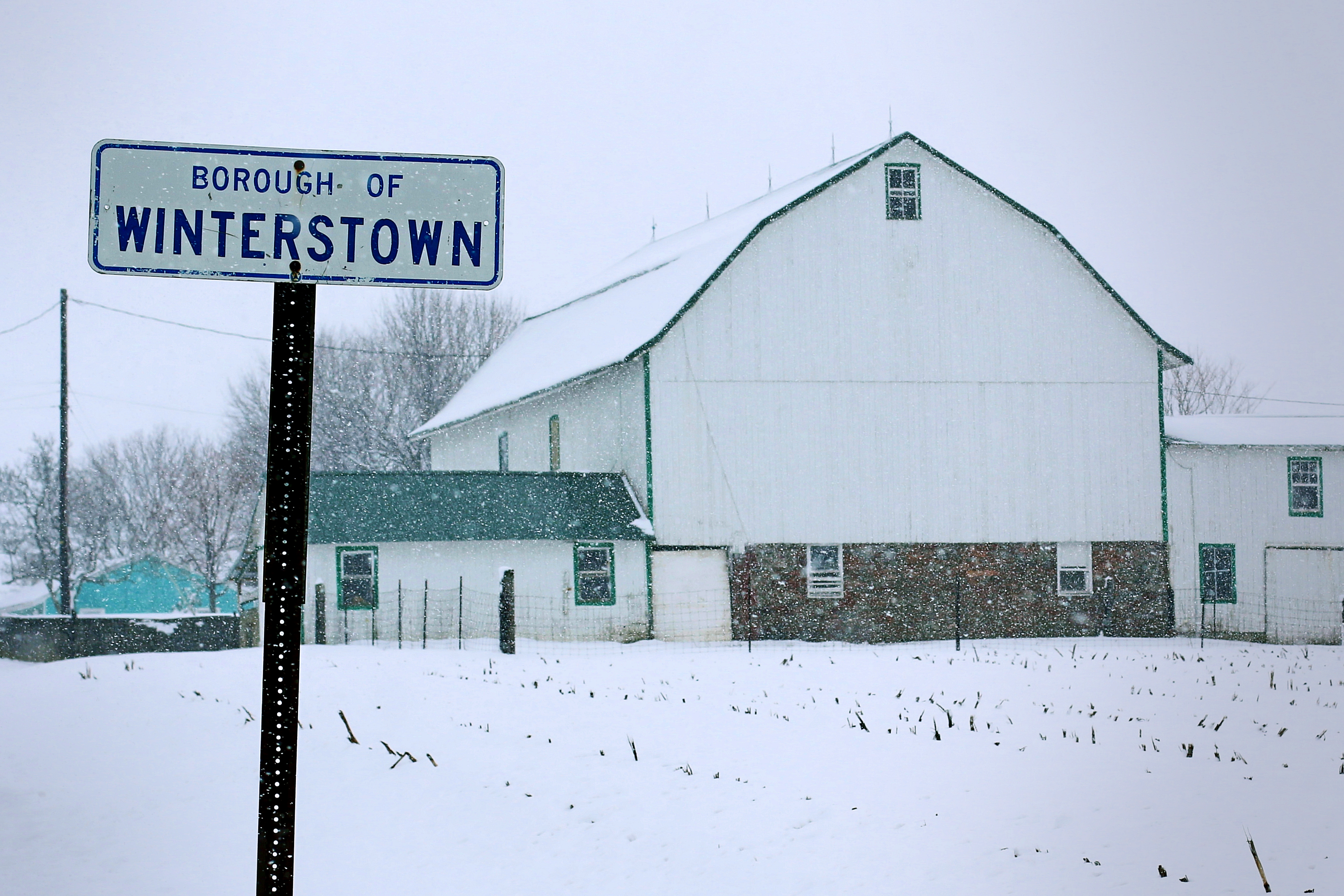
- Snowy landscape at the northern end of Main Street

- Location in York County and the U.S. state of Pennsylvania.

- Location of Winterstown in Pennsylvania Winterstown (the United States)
- Coordinates: 39°50′25″N 76°37′27″W
- Country: United States
- State: Pennsylvania
- County: York
- Settled: 1830
- Incorporated: 1871

Government
  - Type: Borough Council

Area
  - Total: 2.41 sq mi (6.25 km^{2})
  - Land: 2.41 sq mi (6.25 km^{2})
  - Water: 0 sq mi (0.00 km^{2})
- Elevation: 807 ft (246 m)

Population (2020)
  - Total: 608
  - Density: 251.9/sq mi (97.24/km^{2})
- Time zone: UTC-5 (Eastern (EST))
  - Summer (DST): UTC-4 (EDT)
- Area code: 717
- FIPS code: 42-85872
- Website: https://www.winterstownborough.com/

Winterstown is a borough in York County, Pennsylvania, United States. The population was 609 at the time of the 2020 census. It is part of the York–Hanover metropolitan area.

== History ==
Townsend Winters, a resident of Steuben County, New York, purchased a four-hundred-acre tract of heavily forested land in York County, Pennsylvania, circa 1830, from the heirs of Reverend John Smith for two thousand dollars. After clearing portions of the land, Winters began work on building a house there and planted an apple orchard. As other settlers made their way to this area of the county, Winters cleared more of the land, and began sectioning it into individual lots, which he subsequently sold to the new arrivals. That first community, which would later become known as the Borough of Winterstown, was initially named Apple Grove in recognition of the thriving orchard that Winters had planted. Prior to completing work on his house, Winters then sold his home and land to Daniel Brenneman, who completed work on the structure, then built a blacksmith shop there.

The town of Apple Grove was renamed to Winterstown sometime thereafter and surveyed by William Norris. On January 2, 1871, it was officially incorporated as a borough.

== Geography ==
Winterstown is located at 39°50′25″N 76°37′27″W (39.840346, -76.624125).

According to the United States Census Bureau, the borough has a total area of 2.3 square miles (6.0 km^{2}), all of it land.

== Demographics ==
Historical population
Census	Pop.	Note	%±
1880	199		—
1890	209		5.0%
1900	217		3.8%
1910	238		9.7%
1920	222		−6.7%
1930	219		−1.4%
1940	265		21.0%
1950	298		12.5%
1960	349		17.1%
1970	424		21.5%
1980	491		15.8%
1990	581		18.3%
2000	546		−6.0%
2010	632		15.8%
2020	608		−3.8%
2021 (est.)	607	▼	−0.2%
U.S. Decennial Census

As of the census of 2000, there were 546 people, 207 households, and 162 families living in the borough.

The population density was 234.1 inhabitants per square mile (90.4/km^{2}). There were 215 housing units at an average density of 92.2 per square mile (35.6/km^{2}).

The racial makeup of the borough was 99.45% White, 0.18% African American, and 0.37% from two or more races.

There were 207 households, out of which 33.8% had children under the age of eighteen living with them; 66.2% were married couples living together, 7.7% had a female householder with no husband present, and 21.3% were non-families. 15.5% of all households were made up of individuals, and 5.8% had someone living alone who was sixty-five years of age or older.

The average household size was 2.64 and the average family size was 2.93.

In the borough the population was spread out, with 23.4% under the age of eighteen, 7.0% from eighteen to twenty-four, 33.3% from twenty-five to forty-four, 25.1% from forty-five to sixty-four, and 11.2% who were sixty-five years of age or older. The median age was thirty-seven years.

For every one hundred females there were 106.0 males. For every one hundred females who were aged eighteen or older, there were 101.9 males.

The median income for a household in the borough was $45,625, and the median income for a family was $47,917. Males had a median income of $33,523 compared with that of $23,583 for females.

The per capita income for the borough was $19,934.

Roughly 3.6% of families and 4.6% of the population were living below the poverty line, including 7.5% of those who were under the age of eighteen and 9.5% of those who were aged sixty-five or older.
