= Pennsylvania Route 74 =

State highway in Pennsylvania, US

Pennsylvania Route 74

Route information
- Maintained by PennDOT
- Length: 96.4 mi (155.1 km)

Major junctions
- South end: MD 165 near Delta
- I-83 near York; I-83 BL in York; US 30 in West York; US 15 in Dillsburg; I-81 near Carlisle; US 11 in Carlisle
- North end: PA 75 near Port Royal

Location
- Country: United States
- State: Pennsylvania
- Counties: York, Cumberland, Perry, Juniata

Highway system
- Pennsylvania State Route System; Interstate; US; State; Scenic; Legislative
← PA 73	→ PA 75

Pennsylvania Route 74 (PA 74) is a 96.4-mile-long (155.1 km) north–south state highway located in central Pennsylvania. The southern terminus of the route is at the Mason–Dixon line southwest of Delta, where the road continues into Maryland as Maryland Route 165 (MD 165). The northern terminus is at PA 75 south of Port Royal.

== Route description ==
=== York County ===
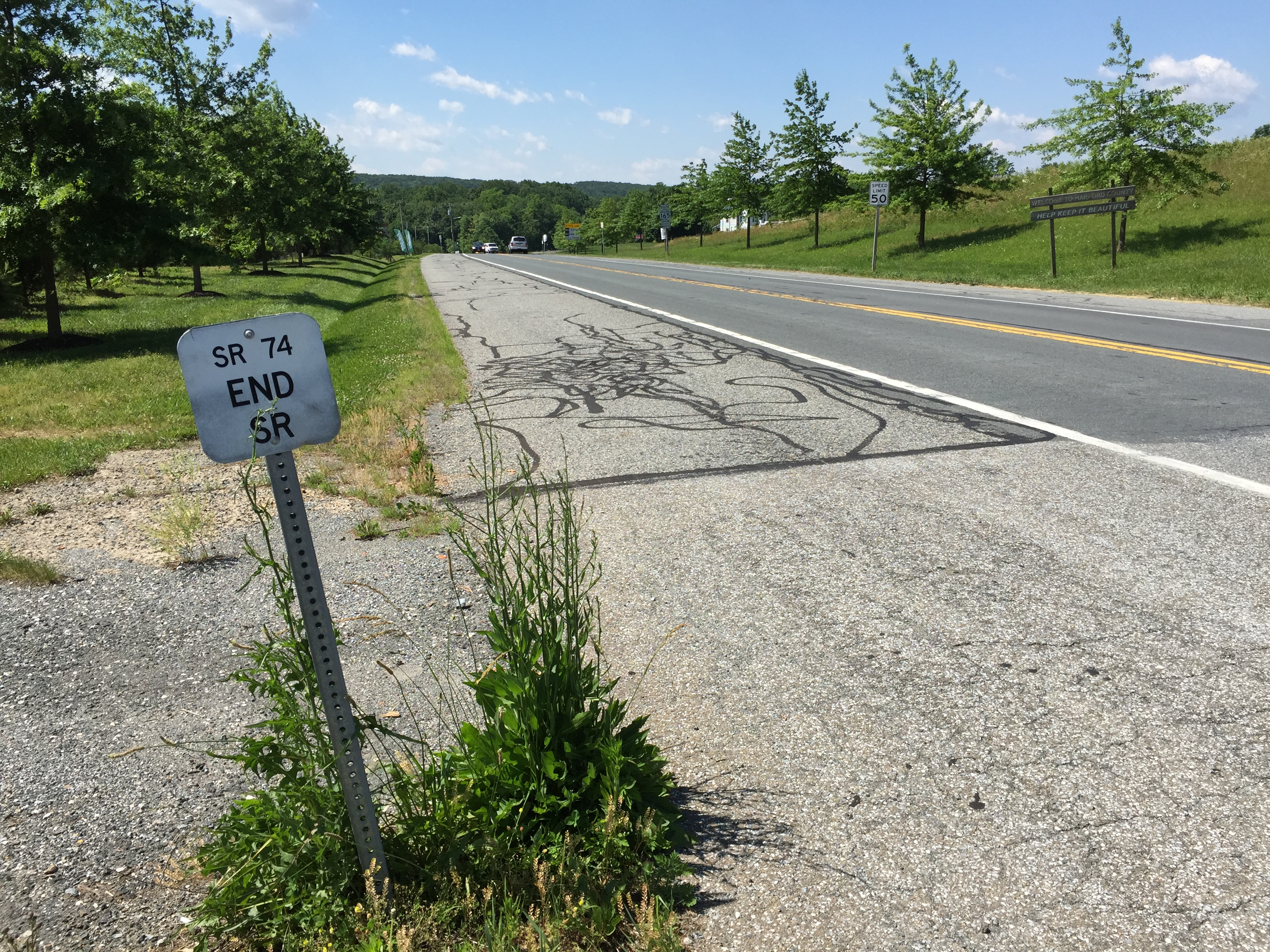
Southern terminus of PA 74 at the Maryland border near Delta

PA 74 begins at the Maryland border in Peach Bottom Township in York County, where the road continues south into that state as MD 165. From the state line, the route heads north as two-lane undivided Delta Road, passing through fields and woods with commercial development as it bypasses the borough of Delta to the west. The road curves northeast and then north and intersects the eastern terminus of PA 851 and Broad Street at a roundabout. PA 74 continues north through a mix of farmland and woodland with some homes, curving to the northwest and crossing the Muddy Creek into Lower Chanceford Township. The route turns west to remain along Delta Road and curves northwest through more agricultural areas with occasional residences. The road intersects the western terminus of PA 372 before it passes through the communities of Sunnyburn and Kyleville. Farther northwest, PA 74 reaches the community of Airville, where it intersects PA 425 and forms a concurrency with that route. The two routes curve west and pass residences and businesses before PA 425 splits to the southwest. PA 74 continues northwest through farmland with some wooded areas and homes. The route enters Chanceford Township and passes through the community of Collinsville, where it heads near homes before running past farms and a few businesses. The road curves to the west and heads through the community of Brogue as it runs through agricultural areas with some development. PA 74 runs west-northwest through more rural land and passes through the community of Keys before it crosses into Windsor Township. Here, residential development along the route increases as it continues near more farms with some woods, passing through the community of Petersburg and curving to the west.

PA 74 forms the border between Windsor Township to the north and the borough of Red Lion to the south before it fully enters Red Lion and becomes East Broadway, passing through residential areas. The road heads past more homes and a few businesses before it reaches the downtown area of Red Lion and comes to an intersection with PA 24. At this intersection, the route turns southwest and becomes West Broadway, heading past residences and curving to the west. PA 74 leaves Red Lion for York Township and gains a center left-turn lane as it passes businesses, turning northwest and becoming East Main Street. The road narrows to two lanes and passes through residential areas as it enters the borough of Dallastown. The route curves west and runs past homes and some businesses, reaching an intersection with the eastern terminus of PA 214. PA 74 passes through the downtown area of Dallastown, with the name changing to West Main Street after crossing Walnut Street. The road passes more homes and turns to the northwest before it leaves Dallastown for York Township and turns to the west, becoming South Queen Street. The route passes fields to the north and residential areas to the south before it runs past businesses. PA 74 makes a turn to the north-northwest and gains a center left-turn lane, heading through more commercial areas and coming to an intersection with the eastern terminus of PA 182. Following this intersection, the road becomes two lanes again and passes through the community of Spry, running north through residential areas with some businesses. Farther north, the route becomes a three-lane road with a center left-turn lane as it passes more suburban development. PA 74 heads past businesses and becomes a four-lane divided highway as it passes west of the York County School of Technology, turning northwest and coming to a partial cloverleaf interchange with I-83.

Past this interchange, the route continues north-northwest along South Queen Street through more commercial areas. PA 74 turns to the west and becomes three lanes with a center left-turn lane, passing to the south of the WPMT television studios. The road enters Spring Garden Township and runs past a mix of residences and commercial establishments, curving to the northwest. The route enters the city of York and narrows to two lanes, passing through dense residential areas. The road bends to the north and becomes lined with rowhouses and scattered businesses, crossing College Avenue. Farther north, the route reaches PA 462, which is routed along the one-way pair of East Market Street eastbound and East Philadelphia Street westbound. At this point, PA 74 turns west to join PA 462 along the one-way pair, with the northbound direction following westbound PA 462 along East Philadelphia Street and the southbound direction following eastbound PA 462 along East Market Street. Both streets carry two lanes of one-way traffic. The two routes head west into the commercial downtown of York. PA 74/PA 462 intersects I-83 Bus. (George Street) at Continental Square southbound and near the York County Courthouse northbound. Past this intersection, the one-way pair becomes West Philadelphia Street northbound and West Market Street southbound. The routes intersect a York Railway line at Pershing Avenue, where West Market Street becoming three lanes wide with two eastbound lanes carrying PA 74 southbound/PA 462 eastbound and one westbound lane. Following this, PA 74/PA 462 cross the York County Heritage Rail Trail and the Codorus Creek, leaving the downtown area of York. The one-way pair continues through urban residential areas of rowhouses with a few businesses, with West Market Street becoming two-way and two lanes wide. PA 74 splits from PA 462 by heading northwest on two-lane undivided Carlisle Avenue. The route crosses a York Railway line and heads through residential areas before it becomes the border between York to the north and West Manchester Township to the south, passing to the north of the York Fairgrounds.

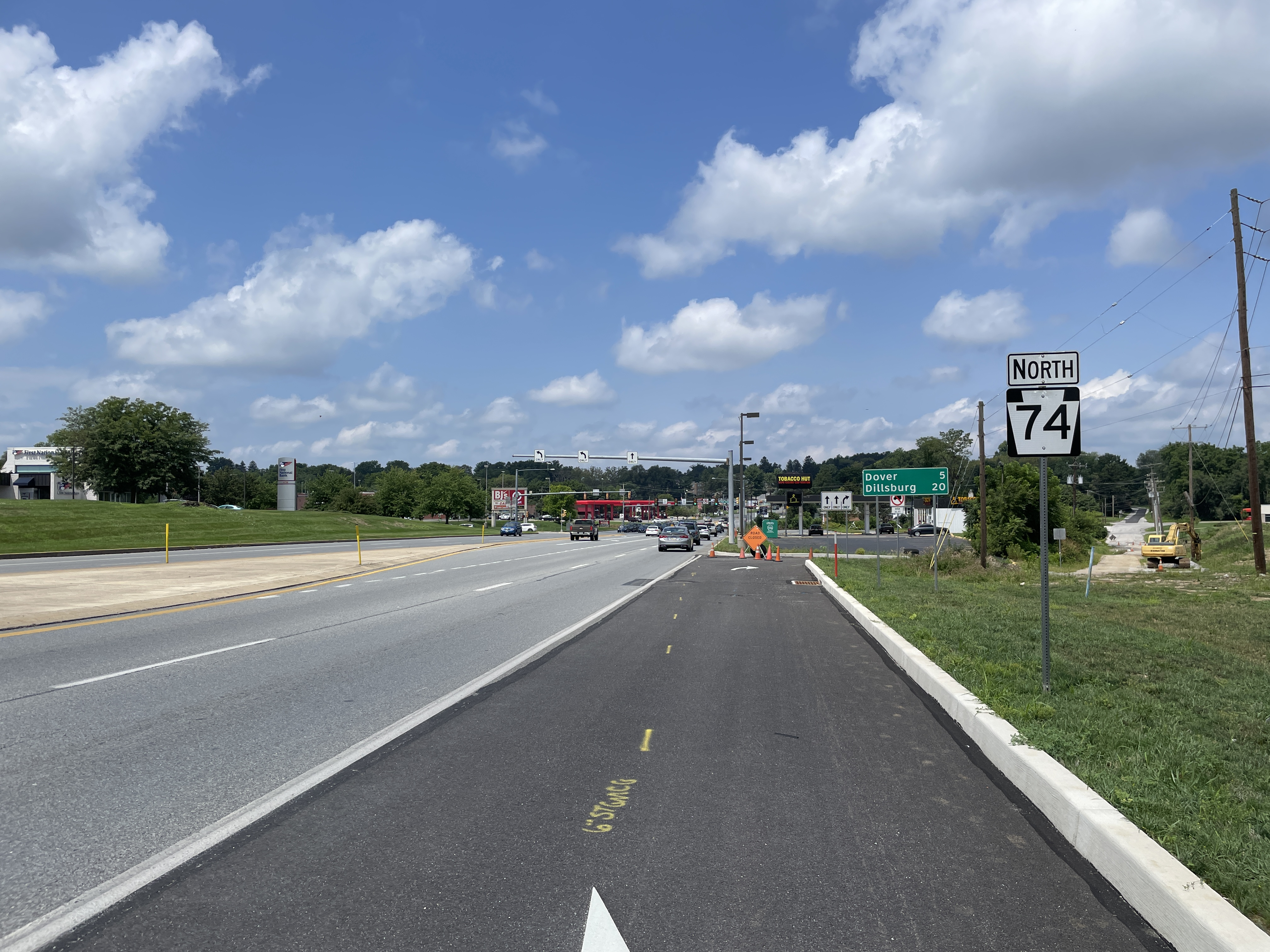
PA 74 northbound past US 30 in West Manchester Township

PA 74 fully enters West Manchester Township and becomes a four-lane divided highway, heading past businesses. The route widens to six lanes and comes to a diamond interchange with the US 30 freeway. Past this interchange, the road narrows to a four-lane divided highway, passing south of the West Manchester Town Center shopping center, before it becomes a two-lane undivided road that runs through wooded residential areas. PA 74 heads into the community of Shiloh, where it lined with a mix of homes and businesses. The route comes to an intersection with the western terminus of PA 238 before it crosses the Little Conewago Creek into Dover Township and heads west past residential and commercial development in the community of Weigelstown. The road curves northwest and passes through more suburban areas, entering the borough of Dover. Here, PA 74 becomes South Main Street and heads past homes and a few businesses, reaching a junction with the western terminus of PA 921. Past this intersection, the route becomes North Main Street and passes through more developed areas of the borough before it crosses back into Dover Township. PA 74 becomes Carlisle Road again and heads through farmland with some residential and commercial development. Farther northwest, the road runs through wooded areas with some homes as it bypasses the community of Mount Royal to the southwest.

The route crosses the Conewago Creek into Warrington Township and runs through a mix of farm fields, woods, and residences to the southwest of Gifford Pinchot State Park. PA 74 reaches the community of Rossville, where it comes to an intersection with the southern terminus of PA 177 and makes a turn southwest to remain along Carlisle Road. The road continues through more rural land with some development before it enters the borough of Wellsville. Here, the route becomes York Street and passes through residential areas with some businesses, making a turn west onto Main Street and heading northwest though more developed areas of the borough. PA 74 leaves Wellsville for Warrington Township again, becoming Carlisle Road and heading west and southwest through farm fields and woods with some homes. The route turns northwest to continue along Carlisle Road and passes through more rural areas, curving west and passing to the north of Kampel Airport. The road crosses into Washington Township and curves northwest, passing through the community of Mount Top and heading back into Warrington Township. PA 74 continues through agricultural areas with some woods and homes, entering Carroll Township. The route heads northwest and reaches an intersection with the northern terminus of PA 194, where it turns north onto South Baltimore Street and passes to the west of Northern High School. The road enters the borough of Dillsburg and becomes lined with homes, curving to the northwest. PA 74 bends north as it passes more homes and heads into the downtown area of Dillsburg, becoming North Baltimore Street upon crossing Harrisburg Street. The route passes more homes before it reaches an intersection with US 15 on the northern edge of Dillsburg. At this point, PA 74 turns northeast for a short concurrency with US 15 on a four-lane divided highway past businesses before it splits north onto two-lane undivided York Road and heads back into Carroll Township. The road runs through farmland a short distance to the east of South Mountain, curving to the northwest.

=== Cumberland County ===
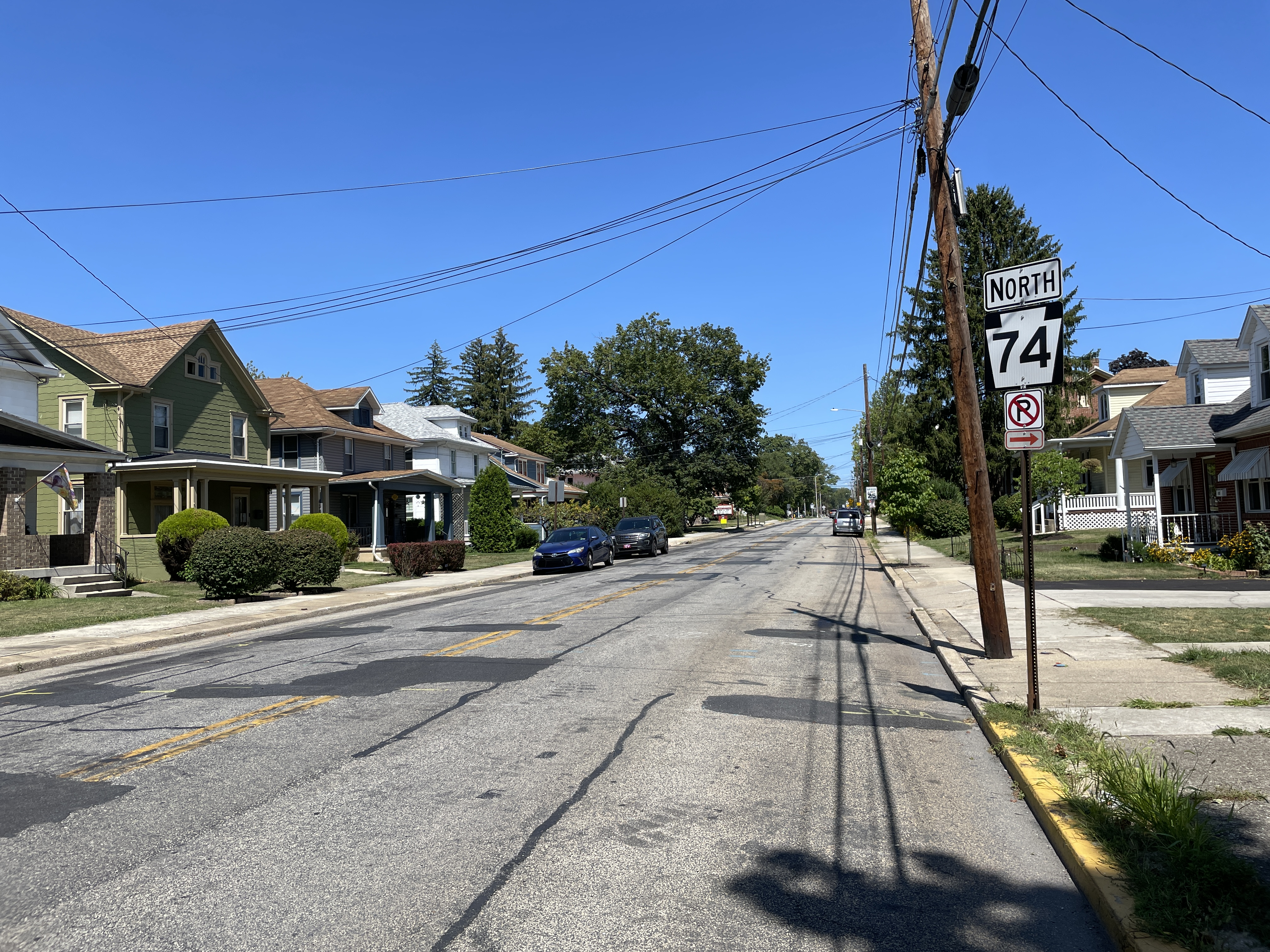
PA 74 northbound in Carlisle

PA 74 enters Monroe Township in Cumberland County and continues west-northwest along York Road through a mix of farmland and woodland with some residences. The route reaches the community of Brandtsville, where it turns north and crosses Norfolk Southern's Lurgan Branch railroad line and the Yellow Breeches Creek before curving northwest and winding through farmland. The road heads northwest through open agricultural areas and crosses PA 174 before it enters South Middleton Township. PA 74 continues through farmland with a few homes, crossing the Appalachian Trail, before residential development near the road increases further to the northwest. The route runs through residential and commercial development before it widens to a four-lane divided highway and comes to a partial interchange with I-81, with access to southbound I-81 and access from northbound I-81. Past this interchange, PA 74 narrows back to a two-lane undivided road and passes through more developed areas. The road enters the borough of Carlisle and heads past businesses, passing south of The Point at Carlisle Plaza shopping mall before it comes to an intersection with PA 641. PA 641 provides access to northbound I-81 and from southbound I-81.

At this point, PA 74 heads west for a concurrency with PA 641 along East High Street, a three-lane road with a center left-turn lane that passes businesses. Farther west, the road narrows to two lanes and passes homes before heading into the commercial downtown area of Carlisle. PA 74/PA 641 reach an intersection with US 11 and PA 34 at Hanover Street at the center of town adjacent to the Cumberland County Courthouse, where US 11 turns west to join PA 74/PA 641 on West High Street. The three routes head west through more of the downtown area before passing through the campus of Dickinson College. PA 74 splits from US 11/PA 641 by turning north onto North College Street, running through more of the college campus before crossing Norfolk Southern's Shippensburg Secondary railroad line and heading into residential areas. The route turns west onto B Street at a roundabout and northwest onto Waggoners Gap Road as it passes more homes. The road becomes the border between Carlisle to the southwest and North Middleton Township to the northeast before it fully enters North Middleton Township and passes under the Pennsylvania Turnpike (I-76). PA 74 runs north-northwest through farmland with some homes before it curves northwest and crosses the Conodoguinet Creek. The route runs through a mix of farm fields and residential development, heading through the community of Caprivi. Farther northwest, the road comes to an intersection with PA 944. PA 74 passes more farms before it enters forested areas and begins to ascend Blue Mountain, turning northwest and then northeast. The road makes a hairpin turn to the west and crosses into Lower Frankford Township as it reaches the summit of the mountain.

=== Perry and Juniata counties ===
At the summit of Blue Mountain, PA 74 enters Spring Township in Perry County and passes through Waggoners Gap, making a sharp turn to the northeast to descend the mountain. The road makes a hairpin turn to the west and then a sharp turn to the north to reach the base of the mountain and head into a mix of farmland and woodland. The route passes through the community of Lebo and continues through rural land, crossing Shermans Creek in the community of Bridgeport. Farther north, PA 74 comes to an intersection with PA 850 in the community of Alinda. Past this intersection, the road runs through agricultural areas and woodland with some homes, heading through the community of Milltown. The route curves to the northwest and passes through more rural areas on a winding alignment, crossing PA 274. Past this intersection, PA 74 enters Tyrone Township and becomes Veterans Way, passing west of West Perry High School before it continues through farmland with some wooded areas. The road crosses into Saville Township and heads north-northwest across forested Limestone Ridge. The route winds north through farm fields and forests with some homes, passing through the community of Erly. The road curves north-northeast and continues through rural land, reaching an intersection with the western terminus of PA 849. At this intersection, PA 74 turns northwest onto Waggoners Gap Road and heads through forests before entering farmland as Veterans Way. The route heads into the community of Ickesburg, where it runs west-northwest past homes and a few businesses and crosses PA 17. From here, PA 74 continues into a mix of farm fields and woods with some homes. The route heads into forested areas and turns north run through Run Gap in Tuscarora Mountain.

PA 74 enters Turbett Township in Juniata County and becomes an unnamed road, turning southwest to ascend Tuscarora Mountain. The road makes a hairpin turn to the northeast and reaches the summit of the mountain. From here, the route turns sharply to the west to begin to descend the mountain. PA 74 makes a hairpin turn to the northeast, a hairpin turn to the west, and a sharp turn to the north to reach the base of the mountain. The route heads into farmland and makes a turn to the east and a turn to the north. PA 74 heads north through agricultural areas with some woodland and reaches its northern terminus at an intersection with PA 75.

== Major intersections ==
County	Location	mi	km	Destinations	Notes
York	Peach Bottom Township	0.0	0.0	MD 165 south (Pylesville Road) – Baltimore	Maryland state line; southern terminus
York	Peach Bottom Township	2.0	3.2	PA 851 west (Bryansville Road) – Fawn Grove	Roundabout; eastern terminus of PA 851
York	Lower Chanceford Township	6.3	10.1	PA 372 east (Holtwood Road) – Buck, Quarryville	Western terminus of PA 372
York	Lower Chanceford Township	9.6	15.4	PA 425 north (Furnace Road) – York Furnace, Safe Harbor Dam	Southern terminus of PA 425 concurrency
York	Lower Chanceford Township	9.8	15.8	PA 425 south – Woodbine, Fawn Grove	Northern terminus of PA 425 concurrency
York	Red Lion	22.9	36.9	PA 24 (Main Street)	
York	Dallastown	23.9	38.5	PA 214 west (Pleasant Avenue)	Eastern terminus of PA 214
York	Dallastown	26.5	42.6	PA 182 west (Leader Heights Road) to I-83 – Leader Heights	Eastern terminus of PA 182
York	York Township	28.0	45.1	I-83 – Baltimore, Harrisburg	Exit 16 (I-83)
York	York	31.0	49.9	PA 462 east (Market Street)	Eastern terminus of PA 462 concurrency
York	York	31.2	50.2	I-83 BL (George Street)	
York	York	32.2	51.8	PA 462 west (Philadelphia Street)	Western terminus of PA 462 concurrency
York	York	33.6	54.1	US 30 to I-83 – Gettysburg, Lancaster	Interchange
York	West Manchester Township	35.6	57.3	PA 238 east (Church Road)	Village of Shiloh; western terminus of PA 238
York	Dover	38.6	62.1	PA 921 east (Canal Street)	Western terminus of PA 921
York	Warrington Township	44.7	71.9	PA 177 north (Rosstown Road) – Lewisberry	Southern terminus of PA 177
York	Carroll Township	52.6	84.7	PA 194 south (Baltimore Road) – East Berlin, Hanover	Northern terminus of PA 194
York	Dillsburg	54.3	87.4	US 15 south – Gettysburg	Southern terminus of US 15 concurrency
York	Dillsburg	54.5	87.7	US 15 north – Harrisburg	Northern terminus of US 15 concurrency
Cumberland	Monroe Township	59.0	95.0	PA 174 (Boiling Springs Road) – Boiling Springs, Mechanicsburg	
Cumberland	South Middleton Township	63.4	102.0	I-81 south – Chambersburg	Exit 48 (I-81); access from I-81 north and to I-81 south only
Cumberland	Carlisle	64.4	103.6	PA 641 east (High Street) to I-81 north	Southern terminus of PA 641 concurrency
Cumberland	Carlisle	65.4	105.3	US 11 north / PA 34 (Hanover Street) to I-81	Southern terminus of US 11 concurrency
Cumberland	Carlisle	65.8	105.9	US 11 south / PA 641 west (High Street)	Northern terminus of US 11/PA 641 concurrency
Cumberland	North Middleton Township	71.2	114.6	PA 944 (Enola Road) – Bloserville, Carlisle Springs	
Perry	Spring Township	78.3	126.0	PA 850 (Landisburg Road) – Landisburg, Harrisburg	
Perry	Spring Township	82.2	132.3	PA 274 (Shermans Valley Road) – Loysville, New Bloomfield	
Perry	Saville Township	87.7	141.1	PA 849 east (Raccoon Trace) – Markelsville, Newport	Western terminus of PA 849
Perry	Saville Township	89.2	143.6	PA 17 (Raccoon Valley Road) – Blain, Saville, Millerstown	
Juniata	Turbett Township	96.4	155.1	PA 75 to US 22 / US 322 – Fort Loudon, Port Royal	Northern terminus
1.000 mi = 1.609 km; 1.000 km = 0.621 mi: Concurrency terminus; Incomplete access

== PA 74 Truck ==
Pennsylvania Route 74 Truck
- Location: Perry County and Juniata County
- Length: 30.2 mi (48.6 km)
- Existed: February 24, 2025–present

Pennsylvania Route 74 Truck is a northbound-only truck route bypassing a weight-restricted portion of northbound PA 74 that features many steep grades and sharp turns that are unsafe for larger vehicles. On this section of PA 74, trucks over 15 tons are prohibited between PA 17 and PA 75. The northbound route follows PA 17, US 22, and PA 75. It was signed on February 24, 2025.
