= Kreutz Creek =

Coordinates: 40°01′10″N 76°31′09″W

Kreutz Creek is a 17.8-mile-long (28.6 km) tributary of the Susquehanna River in York County, Pennsylvania in the United States.

Kreutz Creek joins the Susquehanna River at the borough of Wrightsville.

== Variant names ==
According to the Geographic Names Information System, Kreutz Creek has also been known historically as:

- Creitz Creek
- Kreuztz Creek

== See also ==
- List of rivers of Pennsylvania
