= Indian Steps Cabin =

Historic house in Pennsylvania, United States

- U.S. National Register of Historic Places
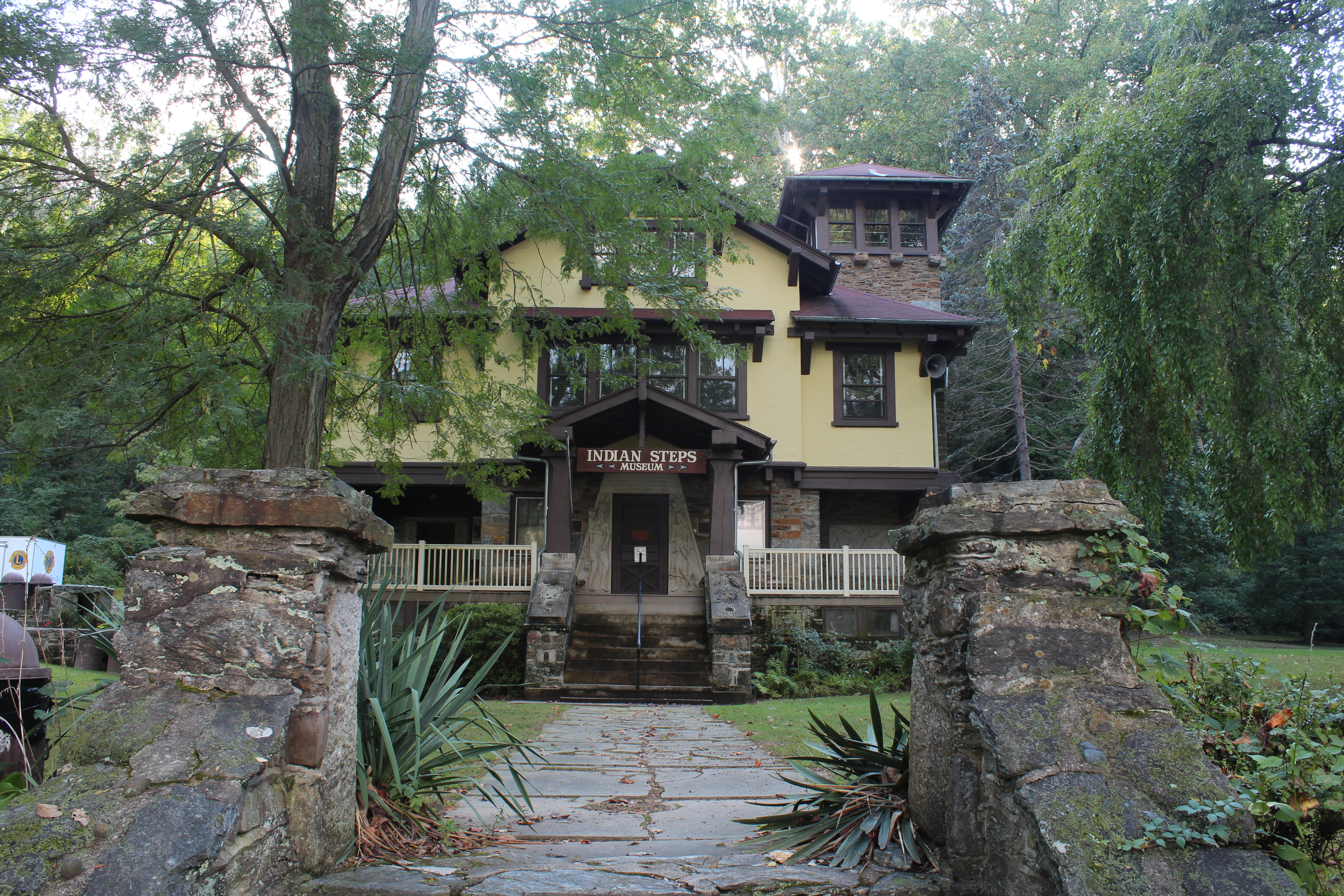

- Location within Pennsylvania Location within the United States
- Location: Indian Steps Rd., north of Airville, Lower Chanceford Township, Pennsylvania
- Coordinates: 39°51′48″N 76°22′33″W
- Area: 9.6 acres (3.9 ha)
- Built: 1908-1912
- Architect: Keyworth, Charles A.; Werner, Frank
- Architectural style: Bungalow/craftsman
- NRHP reference No.: 90000416
- Added to NRHP: March 9, 1990

The Indian Steps Cabin, also known as the Indian Steps Museum, is an historic memorial and museum located in Lower Chanceford Township, York County, Pennsylvania.

It was added to the National Register of Historic Places in 1989.

== History and architectural features ==
Built between 1908 and 1912, this historic structure is an eclectic Bungalow/American Craftsman-style building. It is essentially L-shaped with two wings extending from a circular "Kiva." The foundation and first story are constructed of local, well-cut stone. The second story is stucco on frame. The house features a stone tower with observation deck, and also has numerous cement panels containing inscriptions and embedded Native American artifacts. Also located on the property are a contributing summer kitchen and picnic shed. This structure was built by Judge John Edward Vandersloot, a prominent attorney from York, Pennsylvania, as a memorial and museum to Native American culture. Originally created as a private museum in 1939, it subsequently became a museum that is open to the public.
