= Airville, Pennsylvania =

Unincorporated area in Pennsylvania, US

- Unincorporated community
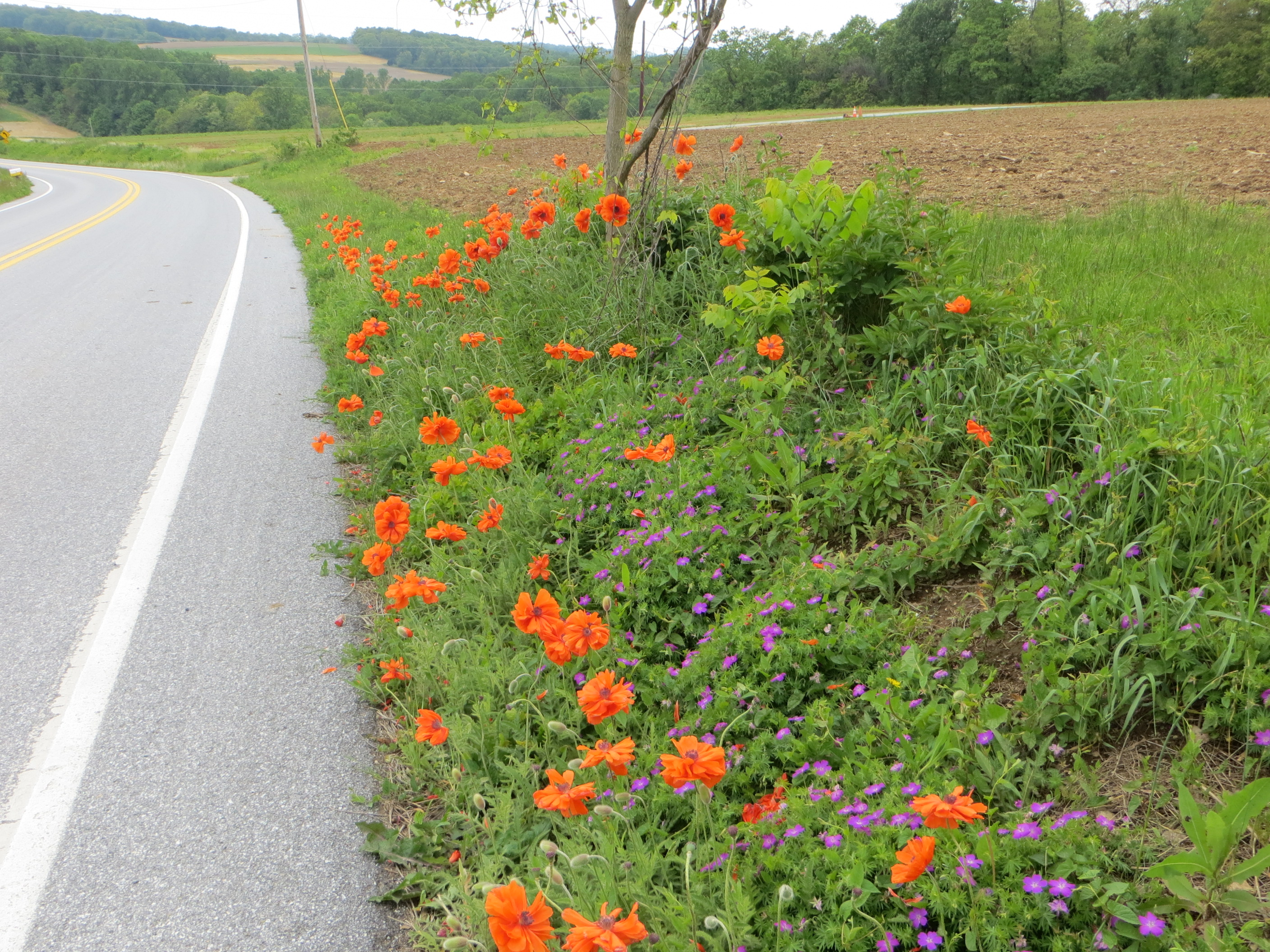
- Roadside flowers in Airville

- Location within Pennsylvania Location within the United States
- Coordinates: 39°49′56″N 76°24′23″W
- Country: United States
- State: Pennsylvania
- County: York
- Elevation: 679 ft (207 m)
- Time zone: UTC-5 (Eastern (EST))
  - Summer (DST): UTC-4 (EDT)
- ZIP code: 17302
- Area codes: 717 and 223
- GNIS feature ID: 1168096

Airville is an unincorporated community in Lower Chanceford Township, York County, Pennsylvania, United States. Airville is located in the southeastern part of the county where Pennsylvania Route 74 and Pennsylvania Route 425 intersect and is approximately four miles outside Woodbine.

Airville has an estimated population of 3100 and includes residents from Lower Chanceford, Peach Bottom, and Fawn townships. The Susquehanna River separates Airville from Lancaster County on its eastern side. Travelers can cross the river via the Norman Wood Bridge along Pennsylvania Route 372, which connects to Quarryville in Lancaster County.

Attractions in Airville include Mill Creek Falls Retreat, the Otter Creek Campground and the historical Indian Steps Museum, which are located along Pennsylvania Route 425 and the Susquehanna River. Otter Creek was mentioned in the band Live's song, "The Dam at Otter Creek." Remnants of the Maryland and Pennsylvania Railroad are also scattered throughout Airville, along Muddy Creek.

== See also ==
- Muddy Creek Forks Historic District
