= Muddy Creek (Susquehanna River tributary) =

River in Pennsylvania, USA

Coordinates: 39°47′24″N 76°17′58″W

Muddy Creek is a tributary of the Susquehanna River in York County, Pennsylvania, in the United States.

Muddy Creek, formed by the confluence of the 11.2-mile-long (18.0 km) North Branch and the 10.3-mile-long (16.6 km) South Branch at the community of Muddy Creek Forks, flows for 17.2 miles (27.7 km) to join the Susquehanna River in the backwater of Conowingo Reservoir.

It is crossed by the Muddy Creek Bridge, Maryland and Pennsylvania Railroad in Lower Chanceford Township and Peach Bottom Township, Pennsylvania.

== See also ==
- List of rivers of Pennsylvania
