= Craley, Pennsylvania =

Unincorporated area in Pennsylvania, US

Craley
- Unincorporated community Census-designated place
- Craley
- Interactive map of Craley
- Coordinates: 39°56′51″N 76°30′38″W
- Country: United States
- State: Pennsylvania
- County: York

Craley is an unincorporated community within the township of Lower Windsor, in York County, Pennsylvania, United States. Craley is located on Pennsylvania Route 624, two miles south of East Prospect.
