= New Bridgeville, Pennsylvania =

Unincorporated community in Pennsylvania, U.S.

Coordinates: 39°54′45″N 76°29′19″W

New Bridgeville is an unincorporated community in York County, Pennsylvania, United States. New Bridgeville has a volunteer fire department.

New Bridgeville is a rural community in York County, Pennsylvania. The surrounding area features rolling farmland and open countryside, with land use primarily consisting of low-density, scattered housing.

Because it's unincorporated, the community doesn't have its own town government. Instead, day-to-day services, road maintenance, and local planning are handled by York County along with the surrounding townships. If there's a real anchor for the neighborhood, it's the New Bridgeville Volunteer Fire Department, which not only handles emergencies but also serves as the main gathering spot and civic hub for local residents.

As an unincorporated community, the area lacks a municipal government. Public services, road maintenance, and local planning are administered by York County and the surrounding townships. The New Bridgeville Volunteer Fire Department provides emergency services and serves as a central civic hub and gathering place for the community. [1]
