= Woodbine, Pennsylvania =

Unincorporated area in Pennsylvania, US

- Unincorporated community
- Location within Pennsylvania
- Coordinates: 39°47′05″N 76°24′21″W
- Country: United States
- State: Pennsylvania
- County: York
- Elevation: 292 ft (89 m)
- Time zone: UTC-5 (Eastern (EST))
  - Summer (DST): UTC-4 (EDT)
- ZIP code: 17302
- Area code: 717
- GNIS feature ID: 1204982

Woodbine is an unincorporated community in York County, Pennsylvania, United States. Until 1978, this community was served by the Maryland and Pennsylvania Railroad at milepost 50.6.

== Geography ==
Woodbine is located at 39°47′05″N 76°24′21″W (39.7848255, -76.4057951).
