= List of places in Pennsylvania: V =

This list of cities, towns, unincorporated communities, counties, and other recognized places in the U.S. state of Pennsylvania also includes information on the number and names of counties in which the place lies, and its lower and upper zip code bounds, if applicable.

Name of place	Number of counties	Principal county	Lower zip code	Upper zip code
Vacation Village	1	Schuylkill County		
Vail	1	Blair County	16686	
Valcourt	1	Mercer County		
Valemont Heights	1	Allegheny County		
Valencia	1	Butler County	16059	
Valier	1	Jefferson County	15780	
Vallamont Hills	1	Lycoming County	17701	
Valley	1	Chester County		
Valley Camp	1	Westmoreland County		
Valley Corners	1	Erie County		
Valley Falls	1	Montgomery County	19006	
Valley Forge	1	Chester County	19481	
Valley Forge	1	York County	17402	
Valley Forge Army Hospital	1	Chester County		
Valley Forge Estates	1	Chester County	19087	
Valley Forge General Hospital	1	Chester County	19460	
Valley Forge Homes	1	Montgomery County	19406	
Valley Forge Manor	1	Montgomery County	19460	
Valley Forge National Historical Park	2	Chester County	19481	
Valley Forge National Historical Park	2	Montgomery County	19481	
Valley Furnace	1	Schuylkill County	17959	
Valley Glenn	1	Lebanon County		
Valley Green	1	Delaware County	19026	
Valley Green	1	York County		
Valley-Hi	1	Fulton County	15533	
Valley Junction	1	York County		
Valley Mall	1	Luzerne County	18702	
Valley of Lakes	1	Schuylkill County		
Valley Store	1	Chester County		
Valley Township	1	Armstrong County		
Valley Township	1	Chester County		
Valley Township	1	Montour County		
Valley View	1	Cambria County	15906	
Valley View	1	Centre County	16823	
Valley View	1	Delaware County		
Valley View	1	Lancaster County	17545	
Valley View	1	Schuylkill County	17983	
Valley View	1	York County		
Valley View Acres	1	Delaware County	19073	
Valley View Farms	1	Delaware County	19064	
Valley View Farms	1	Montgomery County	19006	
Valley View Heights	1	Armstrong County	16226	
Van	1	Venango County	16319	
Van Buren	1	Armstrong County		
Van Buren	1	Washington County	15329	
Van Emman	1	Washington County		
Van Meter	1	Westmoreland County	15479	
Van Ormer	1	Cambria County	16639	
Van Reeds Mill	1	Berks County		
Van Voorhis	1	Washington County	15366	
Van Voorhis Hill	1	Washington County		
Van Wert	1	Juniata County	17059	
Vance	1	Washington County	15301	
Vance Mill Junction	1	Fayette County		
Vances Mill	1	Fayette County	15401	
Vanceville	1	Washington County	15330	
Vanderbilt	1	Fayette County	15486	
Vandergrift	1	Westmoreland County	15690	
Vandergrift Heights	1	Westmoreland County	15690	
Vandling	1	Lackawanna County	18421	
Vandyke	1	Juniata County	17059	
Vang Junction	1	Somerset County		
Vankirk	1	Allegheny County		
Vankirk	1	Washington County	15301	
Vanport	1	Beaver County	15009	
Vanport Township	1	Beaver County		
Varden	1	Wayne County	18436	
Vaux Town	1	Bucks County	18901	
Vawter	1	Bradford County		
Venango	1	Crawford County	16440	
Venango	1	Venango County		
Venango Township	1	Butler County		
Venango Township	1	Crawford County		
Venango Township	1	Erie County		
Venetia	1	Washington County	15367	
Venice	1	Washington County	15057	
Venturetown	1	Warren County		
Venus	2	Clarion County	16364	
Venus	2	Venango County	16364	
Vera Cruz	1	Lancaster County		
Vera Cruz	1	Lehigh County	18049	
Verdilla	1	Snyder County	17870	
Vere Cruz	1	Lancaster County	17569	
Vermilion Hill	1	Bucks County		
Vernfield	1	Montgomery County	19438	
Vernon	1	Wyoming County	18657	
Vernon Township	1	Crawford County		
Vernondale	1	Erie County	16509	
Vernon Park	1	Philadelphia County	19144	
Verona	1	Allegheny County	15147	
Versailles	1	Allegheny County	15132	
Vesta Heights	1	Washington County	15333	
Vesta Number 6	1	Washington County	15429	
Vestaburg	1	Washington County	15368	
Vetera	1	Cambria County		
Veterans Administration Hospital	1	Blair County	16603	
Veterans Administration Hospital	1	Butler County	16001	
Veterans Hospital	1	Allegheny County	15240	
Veterans Hospital	1	Chester County	19320	
Veterans Hospital	1	Luzerne County	18702	
Vexit Junction	1	Luzerne County		
Viaduct	1	Clearfield County		
Viall Hill	1	Bradford County		
Vicksburg	1	Blair County	16648	
Vicksburg	1	Union County	17883	
Victor	1	Clearfield County		
Victoria	1	Fayette County		
Victoria Furnace	1	Dauphin County		
Victory	1	Mercer County		
Victory Heights	1	Venango County	16323	
Victory Hills	1	Washington County	15063	
Victory Township	1	Venango County		
Vienna	1	Washington County	15376	
Viennese Woods	1	Allegheny County	15209	
Villa Green	1	York County	17403	
Villa Maria	1	Lawrence County	16155	
Villa Maria Infirmary	1	Berks County		
Village	1	Allegheny County	15241	
Village Green	1	Delaware County	19013	
Village Green-Green Ridge	1	Delaware County		
Village of Olde Hickory	1	Lancaster County	17601	
Village Shires	1	Bucks County		
Villanova	2	Delaware County	19085	
Villanova	2	Montgomery County	19085	
Vincent	1	Chester County	19475	
Vinco	1	Cambria County	15909	
Vinemont	1	Berks County	17569	
Vineyard	1	Mifflin County		
Vintage	1	Lancaster County	17562	
Vintondale	1	Cambria County	15961	
Violet Hill	1	York County	17403	
Violet Wood	1	Bucks County		
Vira	1	Mifflin County	17044	
Virginia	1	Lackawanna County		
Virginia Mills	1	Adams County	17320	
Virginville	1	Berks County	19564	
Vista	1	Westmoreland County		
Vogansville	1	Lancaster County	17522	
Vogleyville	1	Butler County	16001	
Volant	1	Lawrence County	16156	
Vosburg	1	Wyoming County	18657	
Vowinckel	1	Clarion County	16260	
Vroman Hill	1	Bradford County		
Vrooman	1	Crawford County		
Vulcan	1	Schuylkill County	18214	
