= Grantly Hills, Pennsylvania =

Community in Pennsylvania, U.S.

Coordinates: 39°56′33″N 76°43′47″W

Grantly Hills is a residential community in York County, Pennsylvania, United States and is a suburb of York. It is part of the Grantley census-designated place. Grantly Hills is located in Spring Garden Township, off Country Club Road, adjacent to Wyndham Hills.
