= Tri-Hill, Pennsylvania =

Neighborhood in York, Pennsylvania, U.S.

Coordinates: 39°56′32″N 76°42′31″W

Tri-Hill is a neighborhood of the city of York in York County, Pennsylvania, United States. Tri-Hill is located in Spring Garden Township connected to the neighborhood of Violet Hill.
