= Otto Kneidinger =

American football player and coach (1933–2001)

Biographical details
- Born: May 17, 1933; Altoona, Pennsylvania, U.S.
- Died: May 22, 2001 (aged 68); Altoona, Pennsylvania, U.S.

Playing career
- 1951–1955: Penn State
- Position: Tackle

Coaching career (HC unless noted)
- 1956–1957: Tyrone Area HS (PA) (assistant)
- 1958–1962: York Suburban HS (PA)
- 1963: Meadville HS (PA)
- 1964–1970: Lafayette (assistant)
- 1971–1978: Penn (DC)
- 1979–1983: West Chester
- 1984–1989: Rutgers (DC/OLB)
- 1990–1996: Delaware (LB)

Head coaching record
- Overall: 30–21–1 (college); 35–12–1 (high school)

Accomplishments and honors

Awards
- First-team All-Eastern (1954)

Otto Louis Kneidinger Jr. (May 17, 1933 – May 22, 2001) was an American football player and coach. He served as the head football coach at West Chester University from 1979 to 1983, compiling a record of 30–21–1. Following his collegiate career at Pennsylvania State University, he was selected in the 29th round by the San Francisco 49ers in the 1955 NFL draft.

== Coaching career ==
Kneidinger began his coaching career in 1956 as an assistant at Tyrone Area High School in Tyrone, Pennsylvania. Two years later, he became the head football coach at York Suburban Senior High School in Spring Garden Township, Pennsylvania, where he led his teams to a record of 32–6–1 in five seasons, from 1958 to 1962. His 1961 and 1962 teams both went undefeated and won Laurel Conference titles. Kneidinger was the head football coach at Meadville Area Senior High School in Meadville, Pennsylvania, for one season, in 1963, tallying a mark of 3–6.

In 1964, Kneidinger was hired as freshman football coach at Lafayette College in Easton, Pennsylvania. He remained an assistant at Lafayette until moving to the University of Pennsylvania in 1971 when Harry Gamble was hired as head coach for the Penn Quakers. Kneidinger served as Penn's defensive coordinator for eight seasons under Gamble before he was hired as the head football coach at West Chester University in 1979.

Kneidinger left West Chester in 1984 to become the defensive coordinator and outside linebackers coach at Rutgers University.

== Death ==
Kneidinger died from cancer-related causes, on May 22, 2001, in Altoona, Pennsylvania.

== Head coaching record ==
=== College ===
Year	Team	Overall	Conference	Standing	Bowl/playoffs
West Chester Golden Rams (NCAA Division II independent) (1979–1981)
1979	West Chester	4–7			
1980	West Chester	5–4			
1981	West Chester	8–3			
West Chester Golden Rams (Pennsylvania State Athletic Conference) (1982–1983)
1982	West Chester	6–4	4–1	2nd (East)	
1983	West Chester	7–3	2–3	5th (East)	
West Chester:		30–21–1	6–4		
Total:		30–21–1			
