= Davidsburg, Pennsylvania =

Unincorporated community in Pennsylvania, US

Coordinates: 39°59′01″N 76°53′40″W

Davidsburg is an unincorporated community in York County, Pennsylvania, United States. Davidsburg is located in Dover Township, three miles west of Weigelstown.
