= York Suburban =

York Suburban may refer to:

- York Suburban School District
- York Suburban Senior High School
