= Cultic =

Cultic may refer to:

- Of or relating to a cult, social groups with unusual, and often extreme, religious, spiritual, or philosophical beliefs and rituals
- Cult (religious practice), religious duty and practices offered to gods or saints
  - Cult image, human-made object that is venerated or worshipped, idol
- Cultic (band), an extreme metal band
- Cultic (video game), a 2022 video game

== See also ==
- Cult (disambiguation)
