= Wyndham Hills, Pennsylvania =

Coordinates: 39°56′23″N 76°44′01″W

Wyndham Hills is a community in York County, Pennsylvania, United States. One of the suburbs of York, Wyndham Hills, is located in Spring Garden Township on the hills of the same name. Among the other suburbs of York. Wyndham Hills is on the highest elevation.

The subdivision plan from 1931 included a restrictive covenant that prohibited home ownership or occupancy by any "negro" or "Mongolian" (a term that then meant anyone of Oriental descent). The racist occupancy covenant is no longer in force, but other covenants remain in force.
