= Violet Hill (disambiguation) =

"Violet Hill" is a 2008 song by Coldplay.

Violet Hill may also refer to:

- Violet Hill, Arkansas
- Violet Hill (Hong Kong), a hill on Hong Kong Island
- Violet Hill, London, which the song was named after
  - Violet Hill Gardens, a garden in London
  - Violet Hill Hospital, a Hospital in England
- Violet Hill, Ontario
- Violet Hill, Pennsylvania
- Violet Hill Road, in Dutchess County, New York
