= Pettit's Ford =

Historic house in Pennsylvania, United States

- U.S. National Register of Historic Places
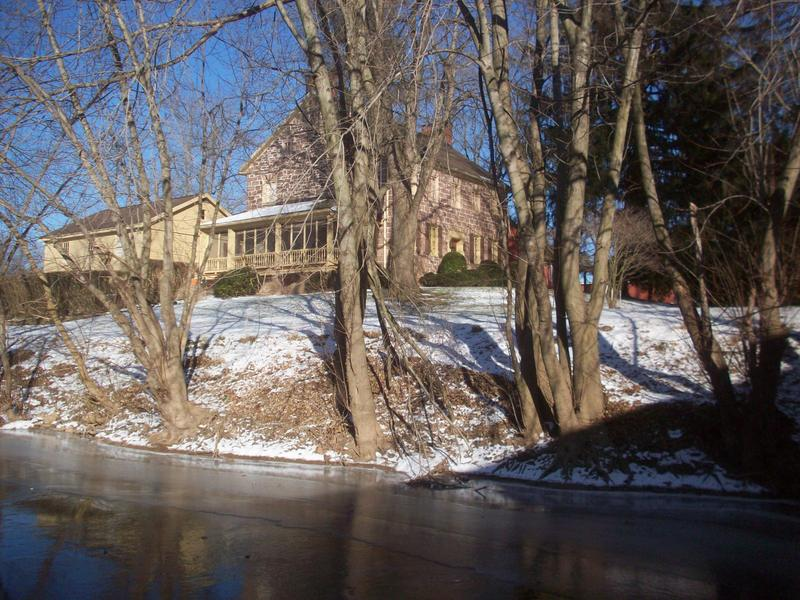

- Location within Pennsylvania
- Location: 4400 Colonial Road, west of Dover, Dover Township, Pennsylvania, United States
- Coordinates: 39°59′17″N 76°55′50″W
- Area: 4.8 acres (1.9 hectares)
- Built: 1798
- Architectural style: Georgian
- NRHP reference No.: 83002290
- Added to NRHP: May 3, 1983

Pettit's Ford is an American historic home that is located in Dover Township, York County, Pennsylvania.

It was added to the National Register of Historic Places in 1983.

== Description ==
It was built in 1798, and is a 2 1/2-story, rectangular red sandstone building that was designed in the Georgian style. It measures 22 feet (6.7 metres) by 50 feet (15 metres) and is five bays wide. Also located on the property are a contributing small stable/carriage house (c. 1902) and a former summer kitchen (c. 1878). The property is located at a former ford across the Conewago Creek.

== See also ==
- 1798 in architecture
