= The Nook (Spring Garden Township, Pennsylvania) =

Historic house in Pennsylvania, United States

- U.S. National Register of Historic Places
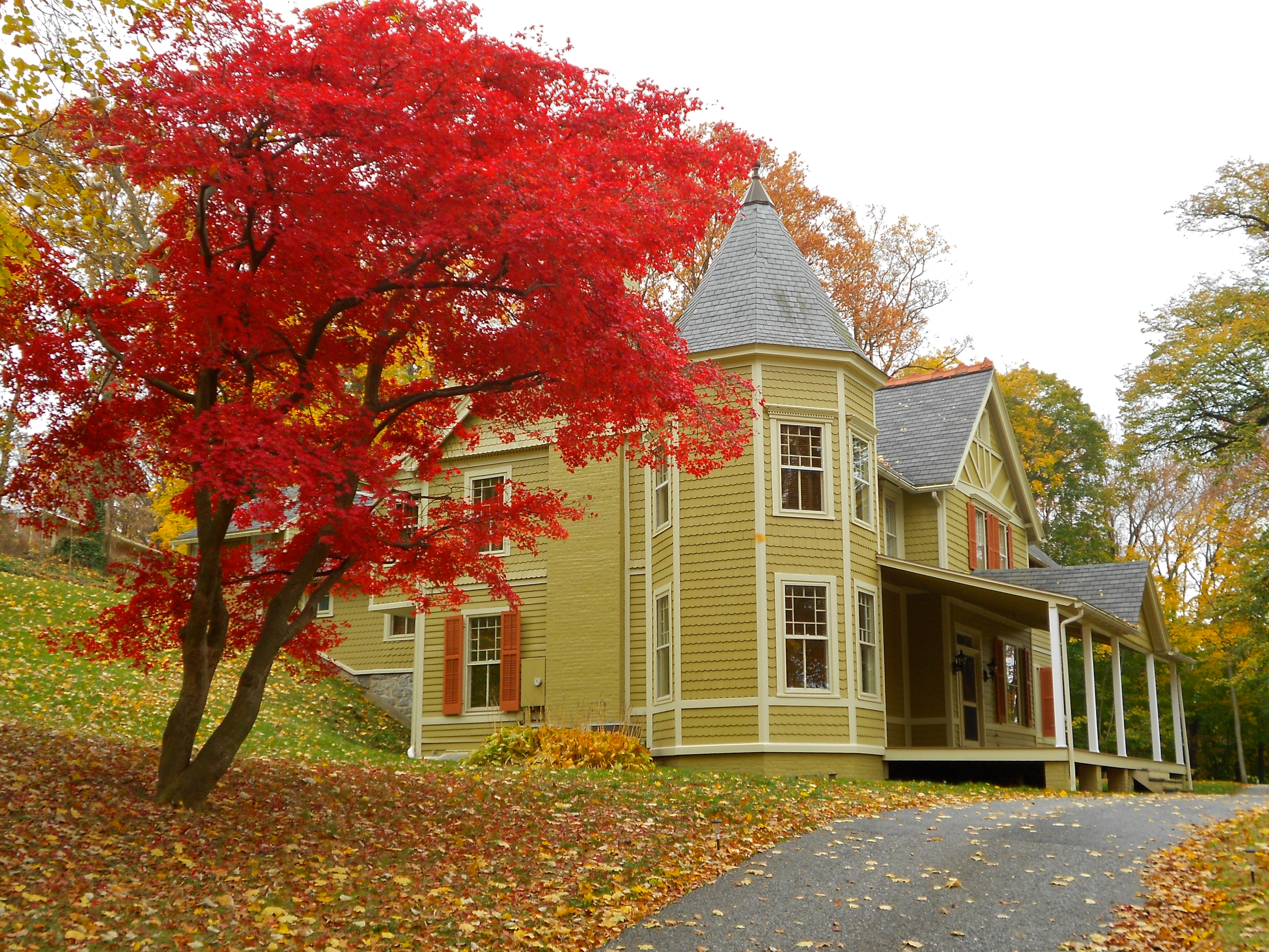

- Location within Pennsylvania Location within the United States
- Location: 1101 Farquhar Drive, south of York, Spring Garden Township, Pennsylvania
- Coordinates: 39°56′44″N 76°43′27″W
- Area: 2.3 acres (0.93 ha)
- Built: 1893-1898
- Built by: Dempwolf
- Architectural style: Queen Anne
- NRHP reference No.: 82003821
- Added to NRHP: March 1, 1982

The Nook, also known as the Francis Farquhar House, is an historic home that is located in Spring Garden Township, York County, Pennsylvania, United States.

It was added to the National Register of Historic Places in 1982.

== History and architectural features ==
Designed by architect John A. Dempwolf and built between 1893 and 1898 for Francis Farquhar, son of Arthur B. Farquhar, this historic structure is a 2 1/2-story, Queen Anne/Shingle Style dwelling. The exterior has a variety of finishes including brick, clapboard, wood shingles, and stucco. The house features a polygonal turret, intersecting roofs of slate and shingle, and terra cotta ornamentation. Also located on the property are a contributing small log playhouse and garage.
