= Valley View, York County, Pennsylvania =

Unincorporated place in Pennsylvania, US

Valley View
- Census-designated place
- Location in York County and the state of Pennsylvania.
- Coordinates: 39°56′59″N 76°42′04″W
- Country: United States
- State: Pennsylvania
- County: York
- Township: Spring Garden

Area
  - Total: 0.77 sq mi (2.0 km^{2})
  - Land: 0.77 sq mi (2.0 km^{2})
- Elevation: 607 ft (185 m)

Population (2010)
  - Total: 2,817
  - Density: 3,600/sq mi (1,400/km^{2})
- Time zone: UTC-5 (Eastern (EST))
  - Summer (DST): UTC-4 (EDT)
- GNIS feature ID: 2390427

Valley View is a census-designated place (CDP) in York County, Pennsylvania, United States. The population was 2,817 at the 2010 census.

== Geography ==
Valley View is located in Spring Garden Township, adjacent to the southeastern boundary of the city of York.

According to the United States Census Bureau, the CDP has a total area of 0.8 square mile (2.0 km^{2}), all land.

== Demographics ==
At the 2000 census there were 2,743 people, 1,196 households, and 839 families living in the CDP. The population density was 3,548.1 inhabitants per square mile (1,369.9/km^{2}). There were 1,252 housing units at an average density of 1,619.5 per square mile (625.3/km^{2}). The racial makeup of the CDP was 96.86% White, 1.68% African American, 0.04% Native American, 0.77% Asian, 0.07% from other races, and 0.58% from two or more races. Hispanic or Latino of any race were 0.91%.

Of the 1,196 households 24.4% had children under 18 living with them, 59.8% were married couples living together, 8.1% had a female householder with no husband present, and 29.8% were non-families. 25.1% of households were one person and 12.3% were one person aged 65 or older. The average household size was 2.29 and the average family size was 2.71.

The age distribution was 19.2% under the age of 18, 4.6% from 18 to 24, 29.1% from 25 to 44, 24.8% from 45 to 64, and 22.2% 65 or older. The median age was 43 years. For every 100 females, there were 89.7 males. For every 100 females age 18 and over, there were 89.2 males.

The median household income was $51,063 and the median family income was $54,698. Males had a median income of $40,972 versus $28,750 for females. The per capita income for the CDP was $27,794. None of the families and 0.9% of the population were living below the poverty line, including no under eighteens and 2.4% of those over 64.

== Education ==
The CDP is located in the York Suburban School District.
