= Cultic (band) =

American extreme metal band

- Origin: Yoe, Pennsylvania, U.S.
- Genres: Doom metal; death metal; black metal
- Years active: 2016–present
- Labels: Eleventh Key Records
- Members: Brian Magar, Andrew Harris, Rebecca Magar
- Past members: Reese Harlacker
- Website: culticband.com

Cultic is an American extreme metal band from Yoe, Pennsylvania. The band coined the term "Dark Dungeon Metal" to describe their music, which takes influence from early death-doom, first-wave black metal, and punk rock, and combines it with dungeon synth interludes and dark fantasy themes.

== History ==
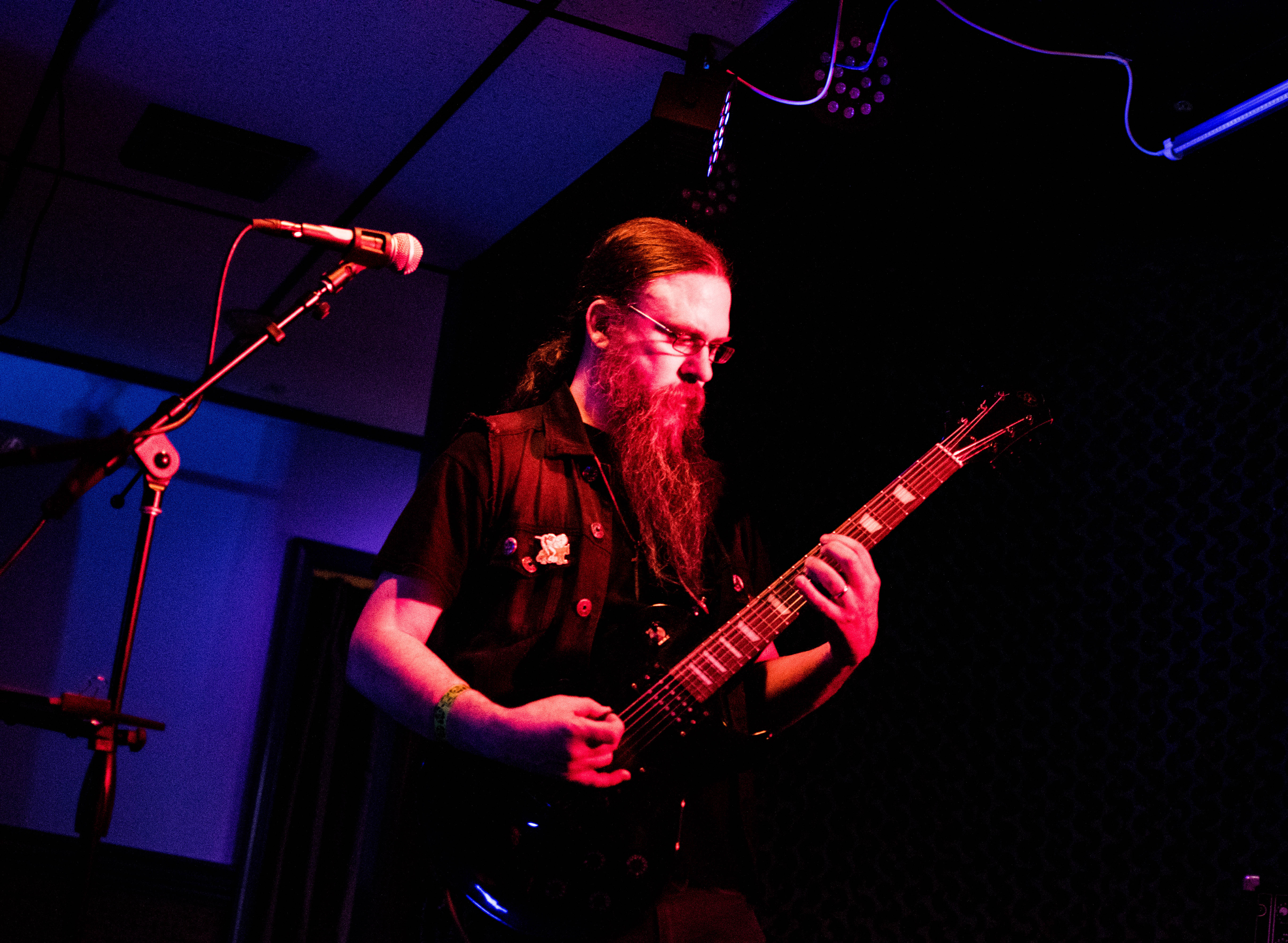
Lead guitarist and vocalist Brian Magar

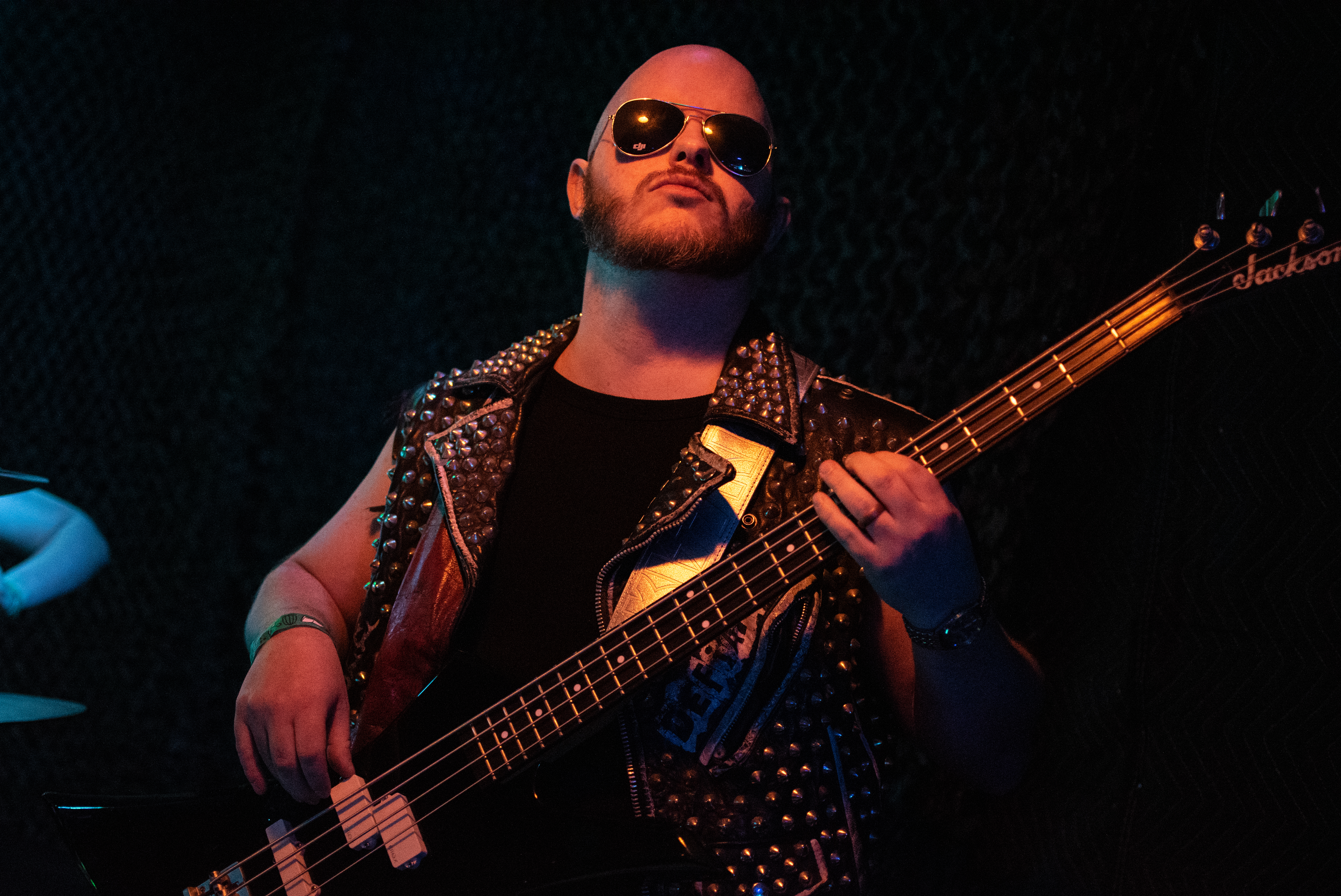
Bassist Andrew Harris

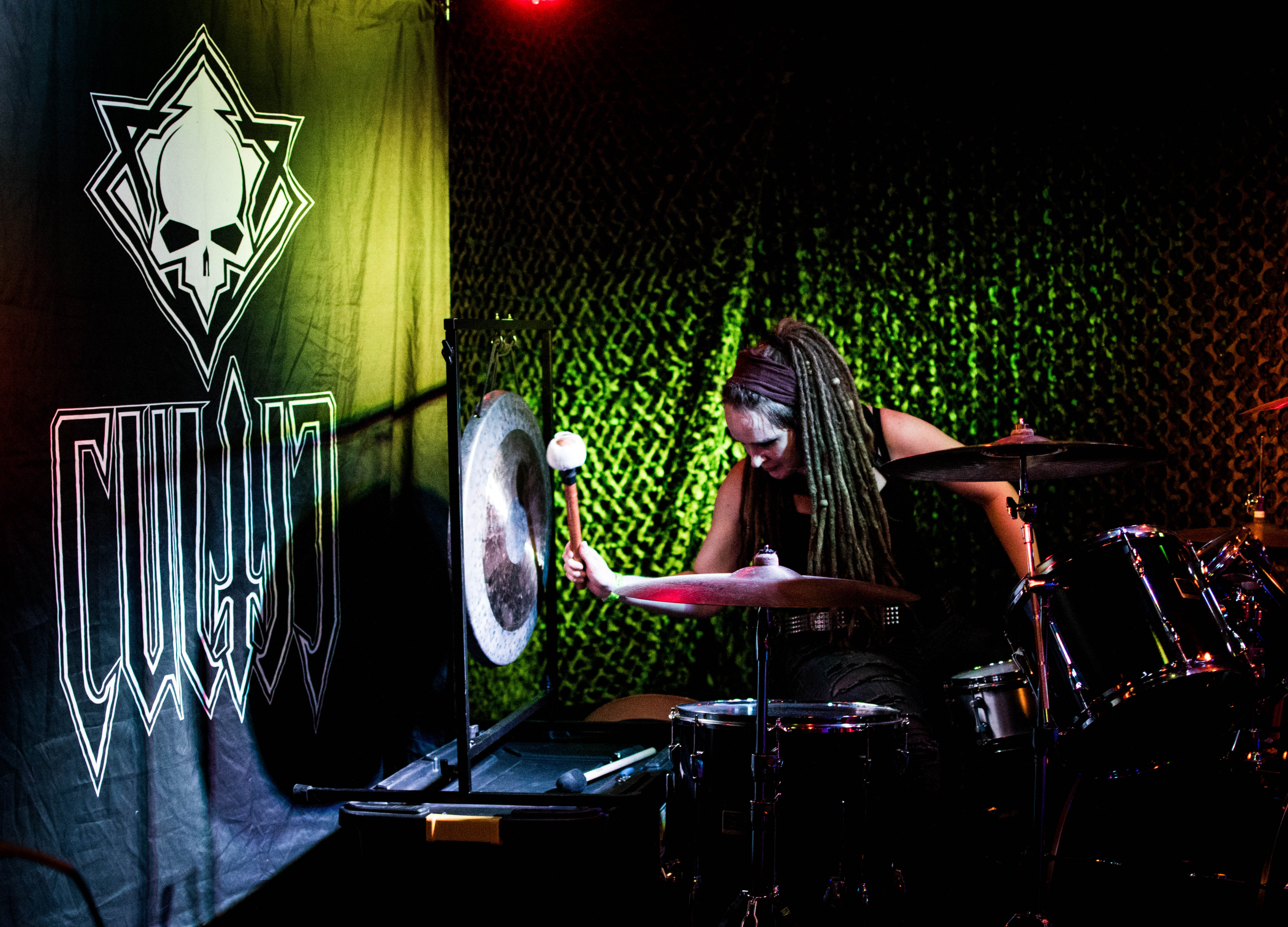
Drummer Rebecca Magar

Cultic was formed in 2016 by husband and wife – Brian Magar (guitar/vocals) and Rebecca Magar (drums), whose initial creative vision was to expand on the sounds and aesthetics of Winter, Hellhammer, and Celtic Frost. Cultic's frontman, guitarist and vocalist Brian Magar, experimented with extreme music at a young age, starting his first band, Septic Waste at the age of 11. He would go on to contribute to a variety of extreme music projects including Guntgrutcher, Layr, Albatwitch, The Owls Are Not What They Seem, and Poison Wind.

Cultic co-founder and drummer Rebecca Magar, became involved in the underground music scene as an illustrator and artist. Going under the moniker Wailing Wizard, she produced album covers, t-shirts, and promotional materials for a variety of bands, events, and fringe artistic projects. She also joined The Owls Are Not What They Seem as a percussionist on the album Feral Blood before becoming a founding member of Cultic.

On August 9, 2017, Cultic released their first self-recorded demo titled, Prowler, digitally and on CD. Prowler included two songs, "Cruel Orders" and "The Prowler", that would ultimately reappear on their first full-length album High Command.

After the release of their demo, Cultic was joined by bassist Reese Harlacker (of Wrath of Typhon, Bittered, and Poison Wind). Together, they wrote, recorded, and produced High Command, which includes guest vocals by Jason Robison (of Wrath of Typhon). High Command was released digitally and on CD through Eleventh Key Records on April 5, 2019.

Their second album Of Fire and Sorcery, was released on April 22, 2022. It introduced dungeon synth interludes and expanded on the conceptual stories from their first release High Command. The album covers from High Command and Of Fire and Sorcery can be positioned side-by-side to form a diptych (the band plans to continue this format for their future full-length releases).

On July 20, 2023, Cultic released their maxi-single Seducer on digital, streaming, lathe-cut picture disc, and CD. Seducer includes two tracks (Seducer and Seduced) and features guest vocals by Rachel Robison. Cultic described this max-single as a segway into their new full-length album which will thematically focus on various characters who live in the imaginary fantasy universe created by the band.

Reese Harlacker moved in 2021, making the band a two-piece again until 2022 when they were joined by bassist Andrew Harris (formerly of Warhawk, Witch Hazel, and Alms).

== Discography ==
=== Full-length albums ===
- High Command (April 5, 2019)
- Of Fire and Sorcery (April 22, 2022)

=== Singles ===
- Seducer (July 20, 2023)

=== Demos ===
- Prowler (August 19, 2017)

=== Music videos ===
- "Forest of Knives" (2019)
- "Beseech the Olden Throne" (2022)
