= Wellsville, Pennsylvania =

Borough in Pennsylvania, US

- Borough
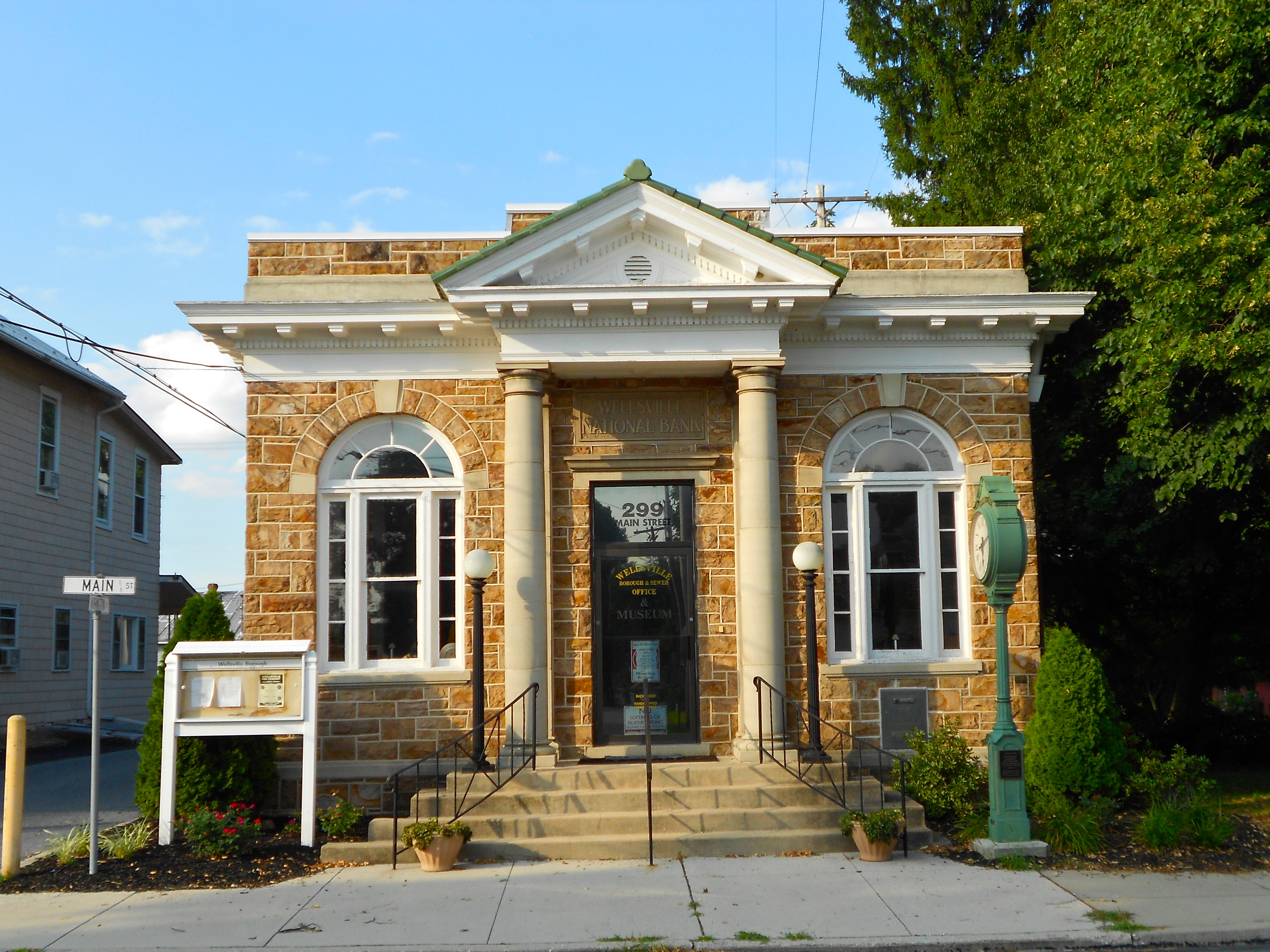
- Borough Hall

- Location in York County and the U.S. state of Pennsylvania.

- Location of Wellsville in Pennsylvania Wellsville (the United States)
- Coordinates: 40°03′01″N 76°56′26″W
- Country: United States
- State: Pennsylvania
- County: York
- Settled: 1737
- Incorporated: 1892

Government
  - Type: Borough Council
  - Mayor: Craig Harlacker

Area
  - Total: 0.14 sq mi (0.37 km^{2})
  - Land: 0.14 sq mi (0.37 km^{2})
  - Water: 0 sq mi (0.00 km^{2})
- Elevation: 522 ft (159 m)

Population (2020)
  - Total: 299 ▲
  - Estimate (2021): 298
  - Density: 1,768.3/sq mi (682.73/km^{2})
- Time zone: UTC−5 (Eastern (EST))
  - Summer (DST): UTC−4 (EDT)
- ZIP Code: 17365
- Area code: 717
- FIPS code: 42-82200
- Website: https://wellsvilleborough.com/

- Wellsville Historic District
- U.S. National Register of Historic Places
- U.S. Historic district
- Location: Pennsylvania Route 74 in Wellsville
- Coordinates: 40°3′4″N 76°56′26″W
- Area: 24 acres (9.7 ha)
- Architectural style: Greek Revival, Gothic, Queen Anne
- NRHP reference No.: 77001205
- Added to NRHP: December 6, 1977

Wellsville is a borough in York County, Pennsylvania, United States. The population was 299 at the 2020 census. It is part of the York–Hanover metropolitan area.

== History ==
Wellsville changed very little visually during the twentieth century; the borough's appearance has remained that of a nineteenth-century community, complete with brick sidewalks and Gothic Revival and Greek Revival houses.

A Walk up Main Street (video - 3 minutes)

Because of its unusually high quality of preservation, nearly all of the community was placed on the National Register of Historic Places in 1977 as the "Wellsville Historic District". Among the district's 48 contributing properties are an 1850s Methodist church, a small group of nineteenth-century commercial buildings, and the Wellsville House, an 1870s structure that has been used as a factory, museum, and restaurant.

== Geography ==
Wellsville is located at 40°3′1″N 76°56′26″W (40.050335, -76.940533).

According to the United States Census Bureau, the borough has a total area of 0.1 square miles (0.26 km^{2}), all land.

== Demographics ==
Historical population
Census	Pop.	Note	%±
1900	296		—
1910	308		4.1%
1920	258		−16.2%
1930	268		3.9%
1940	271		1.1%
1950	309		14.0%
1960	320		3.6%
1970	346		8.1%
1980	347		0.3%
1990	304		−12.4%
2000	279		−8.2%
2010	242		−13.3%
2020	301		24.4%
2021 (est.)	298	▼	−1.0%

As of the census of 2000, there were 279 people, 118 households, and 78 families residing in the borough. The population density was 2,004.1 inhabitants per square mile (773.8/km^{2}). There were 124 housing units at an average density of 890.7 per square mile (343.9/km^{2}). The racial makeup of the borough was 97.13% White, 1.43% African American, 1.08% Asian, and 0.36% from two or more races.

There were 118 households, out of which 34.7% had children under the age of 18 living with them, 52.5% were married couples living together, 8.5% had a female householder with no husband present, and 33.1% were non-families. 27.1% of all households were made up of individuals, and 11.0% had someone living alone who was 65 years of age or older. The average household size was 2.36 and the average family size was 2.85.

In the borough the population was spread out, with 22.6% under the age of 18, 6.8% from 18 to 24, 31.9% from 25 to 44, 21.9% from 45 to 64, and 16.8% who were 65 years of age or older. The median age was 40 years. For every 100 females there were 103.6 males. For every 100 females age 18 and over, there were 105.7 males.

The median income for a household in the borough was $43,750, and the median income for a family was $51,667. Males had a median income of $33,281 versus $25,313 for females. The per capita income for the borough was $17,689. About 7.7% of families and 9.0% of the population were below the poverty line, including 12.2% of those under the age of eighteen and 9.8% of those 65 or over.

== See also ==
- Wellsville Borough Park
