= Big Mountain, Pennsylvania =

Unincorporated community in Pennsylvania, US

Coordinates: 39.95760°N 76.93470°W

Big Mountain, also referred to as Big Mount, is an unincorporated community in York County, Pennsylvania, United States.
