= Grantley, Pennsylvania =

Unincorporated place in Pennsylvania, US

Grantley
- Census-designated place
- Location in York County and the U.S. state of Pennsylvania.
- Coordinates: 39°56′19″N 76°43′47″W
- Country: United States
- State: Pennsylvania
- County: York
- Township: Spring Garden

Area
  - Total: 2.10 sq mi (5.44 km^{2})
  - Land: 2.08 sq mi (5.40 km^{2})
  - Water: 0.015 sq mi (0.04 km^{2})
- Elevation: 584 ft (178 m)

Population (2020)
  - Total: 4,524
  - Density: 2,170.2/sq mi (837.92/km^{2})
- Time zone: UTC-5 (Eastern (EST))
  - Summer (DST): UTC-4 (EDT)
- FIPS code: 42-30435
- GNIS feature ID: 2389863

Grantley is a census-designated place (CDP) in York County, Pennsylvania, United States. The population was 3,628 at the 2010 census.

== Geography ==
Grantley is located in Spring Garden Township, adjacent to the city of York.

According to the United States Census Bureau, the CDP has a total area of 1.7 square miles (4.4 km^{2}), of which 0.60% is water.

== Demographics ==
Historical population
Census	Pop.	Note	%±
2020	4,524		—
U.S. Decennial Census

=== 2020 census ===
As of the 2020 census, Grantley had a population of 4,524. The median age was 22.2 years. 15.2% of residents were under the age of 18 and 15.6% of residents were 65 years of age or older. For every 100 females there were 85.3 males, and for every 100 females age 18 and over there were 83.7 males age 18 and over.

100.0% of residents lived in urban areas, while 0.0% lived in rural areas.

There were 1,039 households in Grantley, of which 35.4% had children under the age of 18 living in them. Of all households, 60.0% were married-couple households, 12.7% were households with a male householder and no spouse or partner present, and 21.2% were households with a female householder and no spouse or partner present. About 20.5% of all households were made up of individuals and 9.1% had someone living alone who was 65 years of age or older.

There were 1,125 housing units, of which 7.6% were vacant. The homeowner vacancy rate was 2.5% and the rental vacancy rate was 6.7%.

Racial composition as of the 2020 census
Race	Number	Percent
White	3,791	83.8%
Black or African American	229	5.1%
American Indian and Alaska Native	10	0.2%
Asian	133	2.9%
Native Hawaiian and Other Pacific Islander	1	0.0%
Some other race	156	3.4%
Two or more races	204	4.5%
Hispanic or Latino (of any race)	258	5.7%

=== 2000 census ===
At the 2000 census there were 3,580 people, 801 households, and 550 families living in the CDP. The population density was 2,155.3 inhabitants per square mile (832.2/km^{2}). There were 830 housing units at an average density of 499.7 per square mile (192.9/km^{2}). The racial makeup of the CDP was 96.54% White, 1.37% African American, 0.03% Native American, 0.70% Asian, 0.03% Pacific Islander, 0.56% from other races, and 0.78% from two or more races. Hispanic or Latino of any race were 2.21%.

Of the 801 households 29.0% had children under the age of 18 living with them, 57.8% were married couples living together, 8.0% had a female householder with no husband present, and 31.3% were non-families. 20.5% of households were one person and 10.6% were one person aged 65 or older. The average household size was 2.55 and the average family size was 2.85.

The age distribution was 12.3% under the age of 18, 46.8% from 18 to 24, 12.7% from 25 to 44, 15.3% from 45 to 64, and 13.0% 65 or older. The median age was 21 years. For every 100 females, there were 77.3 males. For every 100 females age 18 and over, there were 75.3 males.

The median household income was $57,039 and the median family income was $77,216. Males had a median income of $60,292 versus $29,250 for females. The per capita income for the CDP was $28,703. About 4.7% of families and 12.7% of the population were below the poverty line, including 15.4% of those under age 18 and 1.7% of those age 65 or over.

== Education ==
Much of York College of Pennsylvania is in the Grantley CDP.

The CDP is located in the York Suburban School District.
