= Wellsville Borough Park =

Coordinates: 40.050°N 76.9389°W

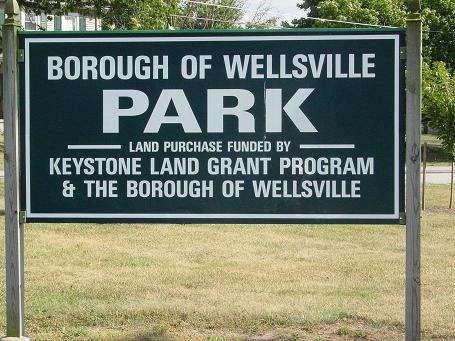
- Location: Wellsville, Pennsylvania

The Wellsville Borough Park is located in the town of Wellsville, Pennsylvania. The park is situated on and around the southwest corner of the intersection of Zeigler Road, York Road, and Main Street (Route 74); it is adjacent to the Wellsville post office. The park features benches, a gazebo, and small brick oven/grill structure.

See Dillsburg, PA Events Calendar
