= Motorcycle Technology Center =

Coordinates: 40.03877°N 76.74512°W

The Motorcycle Technology Center was a private post-secondary institution of higher education serving students from across the country until it closed in 2018. The MTC, one of the schools in the YTI Career Institute system, opened in 2007 in a 15,000-square-foot (1,400 m^{2}) facility located in Emigsville, PA to accommodate its Motorsports Technology program. The Motorsports Technology program prepares students for entry-level mechanic and technician positions servicing various types of motorsports vehicles and had been offered at YTI's York, PA campus from fall 1998 until the opening of the Motorcycle Technology Center.

The Motorcycle Technology Center was accredited by the Accrediting Commission of Career Schools and Colleges, listed by the U.S. Department of Education as a nationally recognized accrediting agency.
