= Vinemont, Pennsylvania =

Unincorporated community in Pennsylvania, US

- Unincorporated community
- Location within Pennsylvania Location within the United States
- Coordinates: 40°16′55″N 76°4′52″W
- Country: United States
- State: Pennsylvania
- County: Berks
- Township: Spring
- Elevation: 584 ft (178 m)
- Time zone: UTC-5 (Eastern (EST))
  - Summer (DST): UTC-4 (EDT)
- Area codes: 610 and 484
- GNIS feature ID: 1204876

Vinemont is an unincorporated community in Spring Township in Berks County, Pennsylvania, United States. Vinemont is located at the intersection of Vinemont and Indiandale Roads.
