= YTI Career Institute =

Private career college in Pennsylvania, US

Coordinates: 40.050152°N 76.398799°W

YTI Career Institute is a for-profit technical institute with campuses in Altoona, Lancaster, and York, Pennsylvania. It was established in 1967 and serves a population of approximately 1750 students. YTI Career Institute is accredited by the Accrediting Commission of Career Schools and Colleges.

== History ==
YTI was established in 1967, when local businessmen in York, Pennsylvania, started a co-educational institution to train entry-level draftsman in response to the expressed needs of area industries. In 1979, the National Association of Trade and Technical Schools (now known as the Accrediting Commission of Career Schools & Colleges) granted its initial accreditation to the institution. In 1981, the Institute moved to West King Street in downtown York. It began offering a program in Electronics Technology in 1984. One year later, it moved to a location on Whiteford Road in Springettsbury Township, a nearby suburb.

In the fall of 1992, the Institute leased additional classroom facilities at the Cyber Center on Pennsylvania Ave in York, and began offering a diploma program in Heating, Air Conditioning, and Refrigeration Technology at the site. The Institute purchased 13 acres on Williams Road in Springettsbury Township and broke ground in the summer of 1994 for a new 60,000-square-foot (5,600 m^{2}) facility.

In July 1995, the Institute moved into its new campus and more technology programs were added.

YTI purchased a 52,000-square-foot (4,800 m^{2}) facility located on Hempland Road, Lancaster, Pennsylvania, to accommodate its student population and provide the opportunity to add additional programs. In the fall of 2003, YTI closed the Mt. Joy locations and opened the Lancaster campus.

The school changed its name in 2006 to YTI Career Institute. Also in 2006, YTI purchased the Computer Learning Network schools in Altoona and the Capital Region.

The Computer Learning Network was incorporated in Pennsylvania as the Computer Learning Center, Inc. in March 1982, and the first classes began in July 1982. In June 1987, the Computer Learning Center, Inc. was purchased by Continental Training Services of Indianapolis, Indiana. Shortly thereafter, the name of the school was officially changed to Computer Learning Network. In February 1988, the school was granted approval to operate a branch campus in Altoona, Pennsylvania. In June 1992, the Altoona facility was approved as a free-standing private career school. On November 12, 1992, the school was purchased by officers of the school under the corporate name of CLN Acquisition, Inc. d/b/a Computer Learning Network.

== Divisions ==
YTI has a number of divisions and areas of focus including medicine, culinary and automobile technology.

In 1985, the Institute expanded its program offerings with its initial business programs. The Institute developed these programs as a result of market research showing the York area had viable employment needs in these fields. In 1987, the Pennsylvania Department of Education authorized YTI to award the Associate in Specialized Technology and Associate in Specialized Business degrees.

The Pennsylvania School of Culinary Arts' facilities include four kitchen laboratories and a 2,000-square-foot (190 m^{2}) instructional dining room that seats 72 people that has offered an Associate in Specialized Business Degree in Culinary Arts/Restaurant Management since 1999. This 21-month program focuses on instruction in both cooking and restaurant management that is critical to the successful operation of a quality food service facility. In addition, a Pastry Arts program is offered that focuses on instruction in basic skills and techniques critical to bake shop operations. Graduates earn a diploma in Pastry Arts. The Culinary Arts/Restaurant Management and Pastry Arts programs are accredited by the American Culinary Federation.

Medical programs were added to the school's menu of programs in 1994. In 2000 the Massage Therapy Practitioner program was added.

YTI Career Institute opened the Motorcycle Technology Center, a 15,000-square-foot (1,400 m^{2}) facility located at 52 Grumbacher Road to accommodate its Motorcycle Technology program.

The allied health division was created at the Lancaster campus and started its first program, Medical Assistant in July 2004. Also in July 2004, the Public Safety & Security Administration (since renamed Criminal Justice & First Response) program began at the Lancaster campus. The Medical Office Assistant program started its first students in October 2004. Medical Coding was added in October 2005 and Dental Assisting in October 2006.
