= Weigelstown, Pennsylvania =

Unincorporated place in Pennsylvania, US

Weigelstown
- Census-designated place
- Location in York County and the U.S. state of Pennsylvania.
- Coordinates: 40°00′04″N 76°49′36″W
- Country: United States
- State: Pennsylvania
- County: York
- Township: Dover

Area
  - Total: 5.8 sq mi (15.0 km^{2})
  - Land: 5.8 sq mi (15.0 km^{2})
- Elevation: 502 ft (153 m)

Population (2020)
  - Total: 15,136
  - Density: 2,610/sq mi (1,010/km^{2})
- Time zone: UTC-5 (Eastern (EST))
  - Summer (DST): UTC-4 (EDT)
- GNIS feature ID: 2390462

Weigelstown is a census-designated place (CDP) in York County, Pennsylvania, United States. The population was 15,136 at the 2020 census.

== Geography ==
Weigelstown is part of Dover Township.

According to the United States Census Bureau, the CDP has a total area of 5.8 square miles (15 km^{2}), all land.

== Demographics ==
Historical population
Census	Pop.	Note	%±
2000	10,117		—
2010	12,875		27.3%
2020	15,136		17.6%

=== 2020 census ===
As of the 2020 census, Weigelstown had a population of 15,136. The median age was 41.0 years. 22.1% of residents were under the age of 18 and 19.7% of residents were 65 years of age or older. For every 100 females there were 94.0 males, and for every 100 females age 18 and over there were 90.0 males age 18 and over.

100.0% of residents lived in urban areas, while 0.0% lived in rural areas.

There were 6,074 households in Weigelstown, of which 29.5% had children under the age of 18 living in them. Of all households, 51.8% were married-couple households, 14.0% were households with a male householder and no spouse or partner present, and 25.0% were households with a female householder and no spouse or partner present. About 24.6% of all households were made up of individuals and 13.3% had someone living alone who was 65 years of age or older.

There were 6,275 housing units, of which 3.2% were vacant. The homeowner vacancy rate was 1.0% and the rental vacancy rate was 6.5%.

Racial composition as of the 2020 census
Race	Number	Percent
White	12,848	84.9%
Black or African American	767	5.1%
American Indian and Alaska Native	58	0.4%
Asian	131	0.9%
Native Hawaiian and Other Pacific Islander	7	0.0%
Some other race	466	3.1%
Two or more races	859	5.7%
Hispanic or Latino (of any race)	1,111	7.3%

=== 2000 census ===
At the 2000 census there were 10,117 people, 3,933 households, and 2,890 families living in the CDP. The population density was 1,740.7 inhabitants per square mile (672.1/km^{2}). There were 4,069 housing units at an average density of 700.1 per square mile (270.3/km^{2}). The racial makeup of the CDP was 96.44% White, 1.22% African American, 0.22% Native American, 0.56% Asian, 0.01% Pacific Islander, 0.75% from other races, and 0.80% from two or more races. Hispanic or Latino of any race were 1.42%.

Of the 3,933 households 33.3% had children under the age of 18 living with them, 60.1% were married couples living together, 9.1% had a female householder with no husband present, and 26.5% were non-families. 21.6% of households were one person and 8.9% were one person aged 65 or older. The average household size was 2.52 and the average family size was 2.92.

The age distribution was 24.4% under the age of 18, 6.6% from 18 to 24, 30.3% from 25 to 44, 24.2% from 45 to 64, and 14.5% 65 or older. The median age was 38 years. For every 100 females, there were 94.6 males. For every 100 females age 18 and over, there were 91.8 males.

The median household income was $45,095 and the median family income was $51,343. Males had a median income of $36,598 versus $23,143 for females. The per capita income for the CDP was $19,048. About 3.5% of families and 5.8% of the population were below the poverty line, including 8.1% of those under age 18 and 3.8% of those age 65 or over.
