= Yoe, Pennsylvania =

Borough in Pennsylvania, US

- Borough
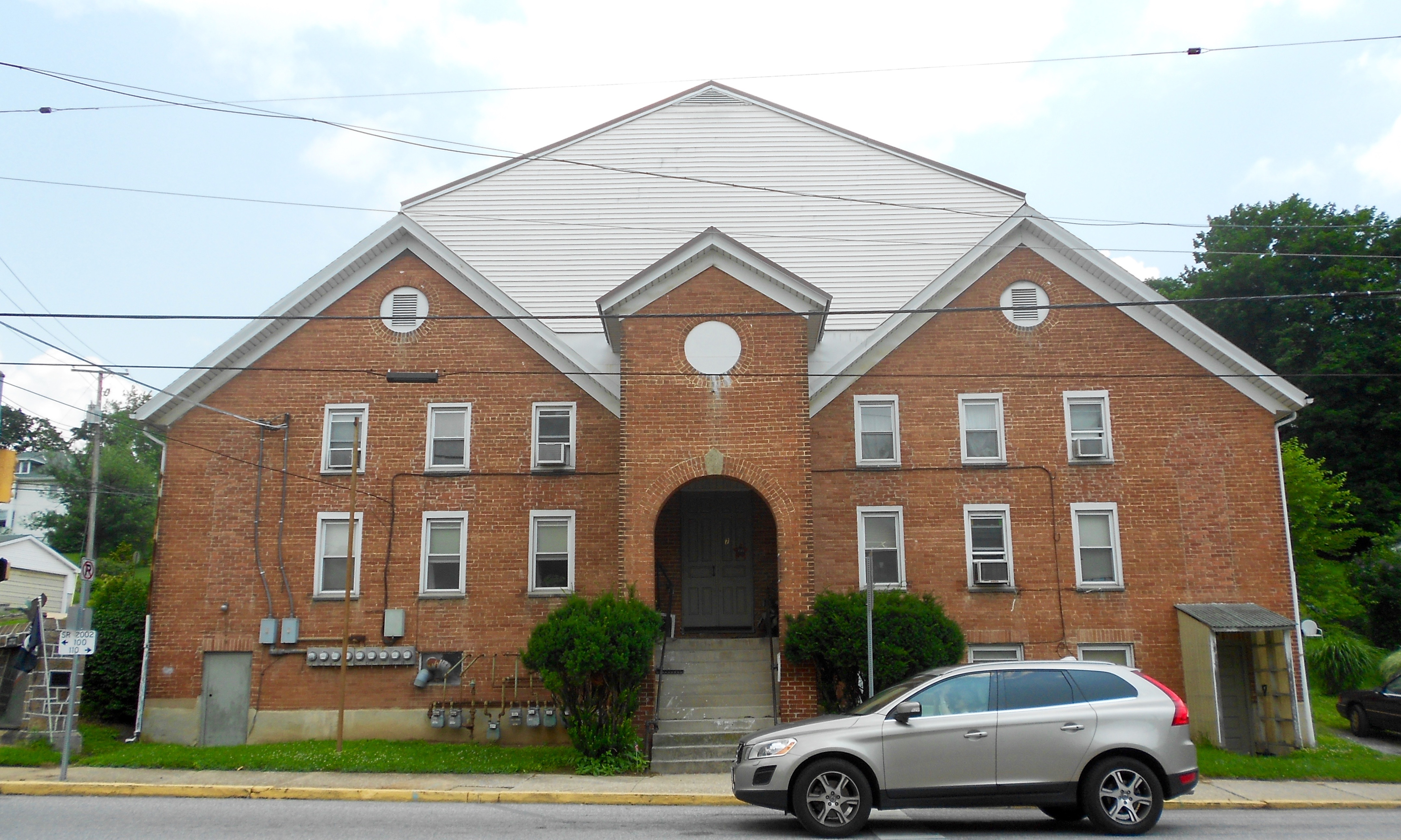

- Location in York County and the U.S. state of Pennsylvania.

- Location of Yoe in Pennsylvania Yoe (the United States)
- Coordinates: 39°54′35″N 76°38′12″W
- Country: United States
- State: Pennsylvania
- County: York
- Settled: 1815
- Incorporated: 1893

Government
  - Type: Borough Council
  - Mayor: John G. Sanford

Area
  - Total: 0.24 sq mi (0.62 km^{2})
  - Land: 0.24 sq mi (0.62 km^{2})
  - Water: 0 sq mi (0.00 km^{2})
- Elevation: 699 ft (213 m)

Population (2020)
  - Total: 1,058 ▲
  - Estimate (2021): 1,055
  - Density: 4,216.1/sq mi (1,627.85/km^{2})
- Time zone: UTC-5 (Eastern (EST))
  - Summer (DST): UTC-4 (EDT)
- Zip code: 17313
- Area code: 717
- FIPS code: 42-87040
- GNIS feature ID: 1215770
- Website: www.yoeborough.org

Yoe is a borough in York County, Pennsylvania, United States. The population was 1,058 at the time of the 2020 census. It is part of the York–Hanover metropolitan area.

== History ==
The borough of Yoe was formed in 1893 from portions of southeastern York Township.

== Geography ==
According to the United States Census Bureau, the borough has a total area of 0.2 square miles (0.52 km^{2}), all land.

== Demographics ==
Historical population
| Census | Pop. | Note | %± |
|---|---|---|---|
| 1900 | 525 | | — |
| 1910 | 567 | | 8.0% |
| 1920 | 535 | | −5.6% |
| 1930 | 560 | | 4.7% |
| 1940 | 528 | | −5.7% |
| 1950 | 681 | | 29.0% |
| 1960 | 731 | | 7.3% |
| 1970 | 790 | | 8.1% |
| 1980 | 990 | | 25.3% |
| 1990 | 947 | | −4.3% |
| 2000 | 1,022 | | 7.9% |
| 2010 | 1,018 | | −0.4% |
| 2020 | 1,055 | | 3.6% |
| 2021 (est.) | 1,055 | Steady | 0.0% |

At the time of the 2000 census there were 1,022 people, 437 households, and 249 families living in the borough.

The population density was 4,135.1 inhabitants per square mile (1,596.6/km^{2}).

There were 456 housing units at an average density of 1,845.0 per square mile (712.4/km^{2}).

The racial makeup of the borough was 94.42% White, 1.27% African American, 0.10% Native American, 0.59% Asian, 0.78% from other races, and 2.84% from two or more races. Hispanic or Latino of any race were 1.66%.

Of the 437 households 34.1% had children under the age of eighteen living with them, 38.2% were married couples living together, 15.1% had a female householder with no husband present, and 42.8% were non-families. 31.4% of households were one person and 6.4% were one person aged sixty-five or older.

The average household size was 2.34 and the average family size was 3.04.

The age distribution was 27.7% under the age of eighteen, 10.9% from eighteen to twenty-four, 33.7% from twenty-five to forty-four, 20.5% from forty-five to sixty-four, and 7.2% aged sixty-five or older. The median age was thirty-one years.

For every one hundred females there were 97.7 males. For every one hundred females who were aged eighteen or older, there were 95.5 males.

The median household income was $34,211 and the median family income was $40,833. Males had a median income of $31,714 compared with that of $21,976 for females.

The per capita income for the borough was $16,795.

Roughly 10.3% of families and 11.7% of the population were living below the poverty line, including 16.7% of those who were under the age of eighteen and 6.9% of those who were aged sixty-five or older.
