= Dover Township, Pennsylvania =

Township in Pennsylvania, US

Coordinates: 39°58′00″N 76°52′59″W

- Township
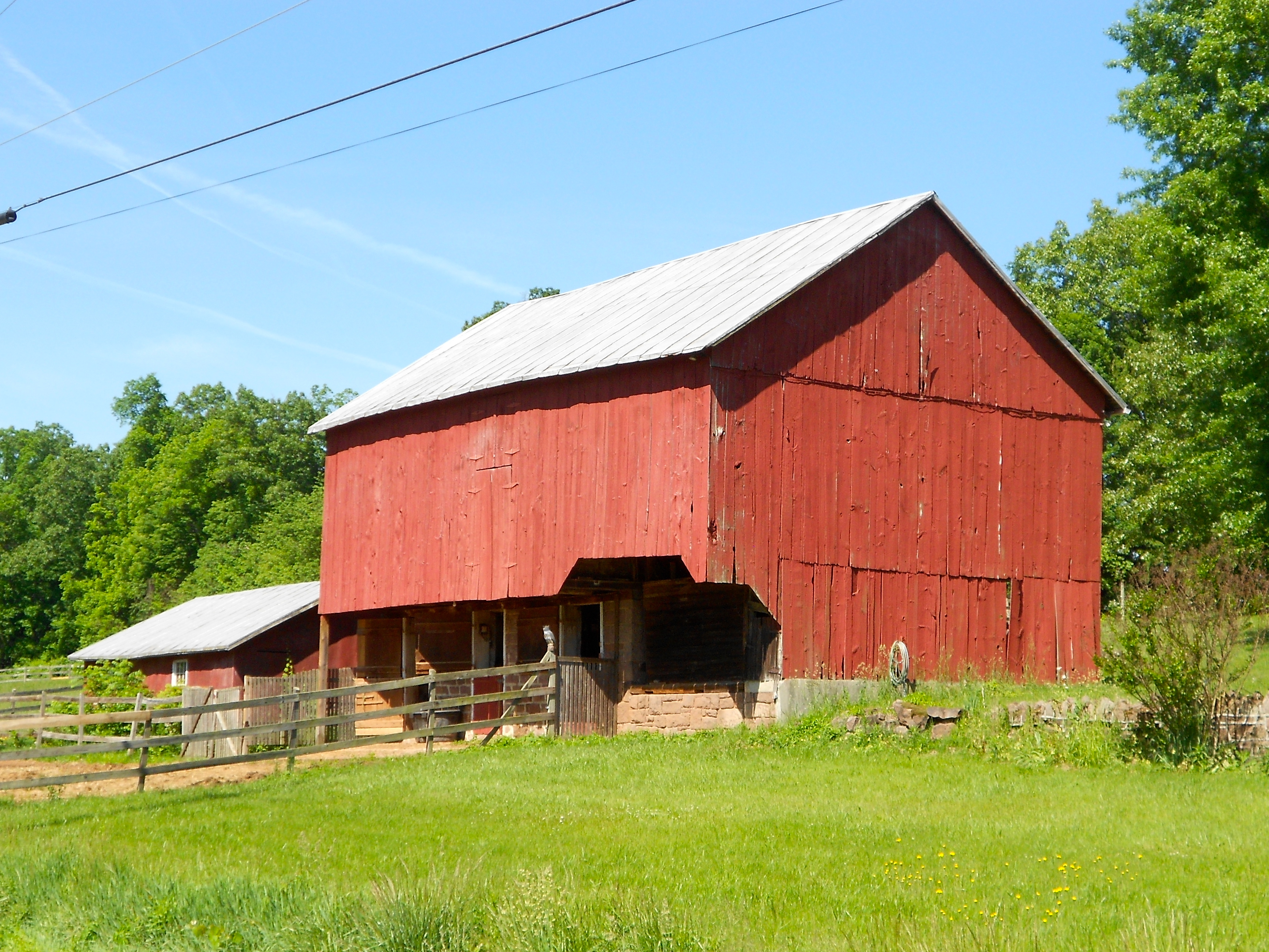
- Barn southwest of Mount Royal

- Seal

- Location in York County and the state of Pennsylvania.
- Country: United States
- State: Pennsylvania
- County: York
- Settled: 1736
- Incorporated: 1747

Government
  - Type: Board of Supervisors

Area
  - Total: 41.79 sq mi (108.24 km^{2})
  - Land: 41.56 sq mi (107.63 km^{2})
  - Water: 0.24 sq mi (0.61 km^{2})

Population (2020)
  - Total: 22,366
  - Density: 538/sq mi (207.8/km^{2})
- Time zone: UTC-5 (Eastern (EST))
  - Summer (DST): UTC-4 (EDT)
- Area code: 717
- FIPS code: 42-133-19704
- Website: www.dovertownship.org

Historical population
Census	Pop.	Note	%±
1850	1,918		—
1860	2,276		18.7%
1870	2,281		0.2%
1880	2,378		4.3%
1890	2,349		−1.2%
1900	2,313		−1.5%
1910	2,211		−4.4%
1920	2,200		−0.5%
1930	2,652		20.5%
1940	3,019		13.8%
1950	3,864		28.0%
1960	6,399		65.6%
1970	8,975		40.3%
1980	12,589		40.3%
1990	15,668		24.5%
2000	18,074		15.4%
2010	21,078		16.6%
2020	22,366		6.1%
2023 (est.)	23,507		5.1%
U.S. Decennial Census

Dover Township is a township in York County, Pennsylvania, United States. The population was 22,366 at the 2020 census.

== History ==
Pettit's Ford was listed on the National Register of Historic Places in 1983.

== Geography ==
According to the United States Census Bureau, the township has a total area of 42.1 square miles (109 km^{2}), of which 42.0 square miles (109 km^{2}) is land and 0.1 square miles (0.26 km^{2}), or 0.17%, is water. Dover Township completely surrounds the borough of Dover and contains the census-designated place of Weigelstown.

== Demographics ==
As of the census of 2020, there were 22,366 people living in the township. The population density was 538.2 inhabitants per square mile (207.8/km^{2}). The racial makeup of the township was 88.7% white, 4.2% black, 1.1% Asian, 1.6% Native American, and 4.4% from other races. 4.3% of the population were Hispanic or Latino of any race.

As of the census of 2010, there were 21,078 people living in the township. The population density was 507.2 inhabitants per square mile (195.8/km^{2}). The racial makeup of the township was 93.6% white, 3.0% black, 0.8% Asian, 0.6% Native American, and 2% from other races. 2.3% of the population were Hispanic or Latino of any race.

As of the census of 2000, there were 18,074 people, 6,999 households, and 5,256 families living in the township. The population density was 430.4 inhabitants per square mile (166.2/km^{2}). There were 7,217 housing units at an average density of 171.8 units per square mile (66.3 units/km^{2}). The racial makeup of the township was 97.25% White, 0.92% African American, 0.19% Native American, 0.43% Asian, 0.01% Pacific Islander, 0.51% from other races, and 0.69% from two or more races. Hispanic or Latino of any race were 1.03% of the population.

There were 6,999 households, out of which 33.6% had children under the age of 18 living with them, 63.0% were married couples living together, 7.8% had a female householder with no husband present, and 24.9% were non-families. 20.2% of all households were made up of individuals, and 7.7% had someone living alone who was 65 years of age or older. The average household size was 2.55 and the average family size was 2.93.

In the township the population was spread out, with 24.2% under the age of 18, 6.7% from 18 to 24, 31.1% from 25 to 44, 25.3% from 45 to 64, and 12.7% who were 65 years of age or older. The median age was 38 years. For every 100 females, there were 98.0 males. For every 100 females age 18 and over, there were 95.5 males.

The median income for a household in the township was $46,845, and the median income for a family was $53,252. Males had a median income of $36,478 versus $23,787 for females. The per capita income for the township was $20,513. About 2.8% of families and 4.2% of the population were below the poverty line, including 5.2% of those under age 18 and 4.4% of those age 65 or over.

== Education ==
Dover Township is served by the Dover Area School District, including Dover Area High School.

== See also ==
- Detters Mill, Pennsylvania
