= Valley Forge, York County, Pennsylvania =

Village in Pennsylvania, U.S.

Valley Forge, York County
- Village
- Interactive map of Valley Forge, York County
- Coordinates: 39°59′4.35″N 76°42′26.88″W.
- Country: United States
- State: Pennsylvania
- County: York
- Elevation: 420 ft (130 m)
- Time zone: CST
  - Summer (DST): CDT
- GNIS feature ID: 1190297

Valley Forge is a village in the southwestern corner of Springettsbury Township, York County, Pennsylvania, United States. The community is located just to the northeast of the city of York near the intersection of U.S. Route 30 and North Sherman Street. Harley-Davidson's York plant is nominally located in Valley Forge.

== Two Valley Forges ==
This Valley Forge is one of two communities in Pennsylvania with the same name. The other Valley Forge is roughly 70 miles (110 km) east, in Montgomery County. The other village is that which is associated with the pivotal winter encampment of the Continental Army during the American Revolution. Since the Continental Congress spent that same winter in York, near this Valley Forge, there is room for confusion. The other Valley Forge is also the control city used on Interstate 76.
