= Steve Hoffman (American football) =

American football player and coach (born 1958)

Atlanta Falcons
- Title: Senior assistant

Personal information
- Born: September 8, 1958 (age 68); Camden, New Jersey, U.S.
- Listed height: 6 ft 0 in (1.83 m)
- Listed weight: 185 lb (84 kg)

Career information
- High school: York Suburban Senior (York, Pennsylvania)
- College: Dickinson
- NFL draft: 1981: undrafted

Career history

Playing
- Washington Redskins (1981)*; Washington Federals (1983); Washington Redskins (1983)*; Seattle Seahawks (1984)*; New Orleans Saints (1985)*
- * Offseason or practice squad member only

Coaching
- Miami (1985–1987) Assistant special teams coach; Miami Sunset HS (1988) Head coach; Dallas Cowboys (1989–2004) Special teams coach & offensive and defensive quality control; Atlanta Falcons (2006) Assistant special teams coach; Miami Dolphins (2007–2008) Assistant special teams coach; Kansas City Chiefs (2009–2011) Special teams coach; Oakland Raiders (2012) Special teams coordinator; Tennessee Titans (2013–2016) Assistant special teams coach; Tennessee Titans (2017) Special teams coordinator; Atlanta Falcons (2021–present) Senior assistant

Awards and highlights
- 3× Super Bowl champion (XXVII, XXVIII, XXX); National champion (1987); All-Mid-Atlantic Conference (1980)

Steven C. Hoffman (born September 8, 1958) is an American football coach who is the senior assistant for the Atlanta Falcons of the National Football League (NFL). He won three Super Bowls with the Dallas Cowboys of the NFL and one national championship at the University of Miami. He also was a member of the Washington Federals in the United States Football League (USFL). He played college football at Dickinson College.

== Early life ==
Hoffman attended York Suburban Senior High School, where he competed in football and baseball. He accepted a football scholarship from Dickinson College, where he played quarterback, running back, wide receiver, placekicker and punter. As a senior, he received All-Mid-Atlantic Conference honors at punter. He was also a member of the Raven's Claw Society.

In 1983, he punted for the Washington Federals of the United States Football League in 3 games before being cut. He also went to training camp with the Washington Redskins in 1981 and 1983, the Seattle Seahawks in 1984 and the New Orleans Saints in 1985.

== Coaching career ==
=== Miami Hurricanes ===
In 1985, he began his coaching career at the University of Miami as the kicking coach. He was a part of the 1987 National Championship team under head coach Jimmy Johnson. He tutored future NFL punter Jeff Feagles.

He also spent two springs in Italy as offensive coordinator of the Bellusco Seahawks in 1987 and the Rho Blacknights in 1988. In the fall of 1988, he coached at Miami Sunset Senior High School.

=== Dallas Cowboys ===
In 1989, he followed head coach Jimmy Johnson and joined the Dallas Cowboys as the kicking coach. In 1990, he added quality control duties to his responsibilities, coordinating offensive and defensive scouting of future opponents, while providing internal analysis of the team's own tendencies.

In the 1990s, the Cowboys organization felt they could find placekickers and punters through free agency, without the need of paying a premium and adversely impacting the salary cap, so they allowed talented and productive players to leave, instead of signing them into long-term contracts. In 16 seasons, he was entrusted with helping to find and develop young talent. He scouted and coached seven rookie or first-year free agent kickers, that included Ken Willis, Lin Elliott, Chris Boniol, Richie Cunningham, Tim Seder, Jon Hilbert and Billy Cundiff. He also signed and coached 5 rookie or first-year free agent punters, that included John Jett, Micah Knorr, Filip Filipovic, Toby Gowin and Mat McBriar. His specialists established 15 separate club records.

He won three Super Bowl titles with the Cowboys. His contract was not renewed at the end of the 2004 season.

=== Atlanta Falcons ===
Hoffman took a year off from coaching in 2005, during which he acted as a consultant for several NFL teams and ran his own business. In 2006, Hoffman served as assistant special teams coach under special teams coordinator Joe DeCamillis and head coach Jim Mora.

=== Miami Dolphins ===
In 2007, Hoffman was hired as assistant special teams coach for the Miami Dolphins. He worked under first-year head coach Cam Cameron and special teams coordinator Keith Armstrong. He contributed to kicker Jay Feely setting the single-season franchise record for field goal percentage at 91.3. He also instructed rookie punter Brandon Fields.

In 2008, he was one of only two coaches initially retained after Cameron's firing by Tony Sparano. He helped to develop rookie free agent kicker Dan Carpenter, who went on to make 21-of-25 field goals (84.0%), including a Dolphins rookie record 14 straight.

=== Kansas City Chiefs ===
In 2009, Hoffman was hired by the Kansas City Chiefs to be the special teams coach for the first time in his career. In his first year, the special teams units improved significantly. He contributed to rookie Ryan Succop becoming an NFL starter and tying for the highest field goal percentage (86.2%) by an NFL rookie since 1970. Punter Dustin Colquitt set a new single-season team net punting average (40.8).

=== Oakland Raiders ===
On February 3, 2012, Hoffman was hired as special teams coordinator of the Oakland Raiders by new head coach Dennis Allen. In his lone season with the team, placekicker Sebastian Janikowski achieved a 91.2% field goal percentage and was 25-for-25 inside of 50 yards for the first time in his career. He was relieved of his duties at the end of the season.

=== Tennessee Titans ===
On February 18, 2013, Hoffman was hired as an assistant special teams coach for the Tennessee Titans. On October 3, 2016, he was promoted to special teams coordinator after Bobby April was relieved of his duties. In 2016, placekicker Ryan Succop had his best career field goal percentage (91.7%) and was 18-for-18 inside the 50 yard line. In January 2018, Hoffman was not retained as special teams coach for the Titans. He was replaced by Craig Aukerman in head coach Mike Vrabel's new coaching staff.

=== Atlanta Falcons ===
Hoffman was hired to be the Senior Assistant for Special Teams for the Atlanta Falcons on January 23, 2021.
