= DeWolfe Miller III =

American admiral (born 1959)

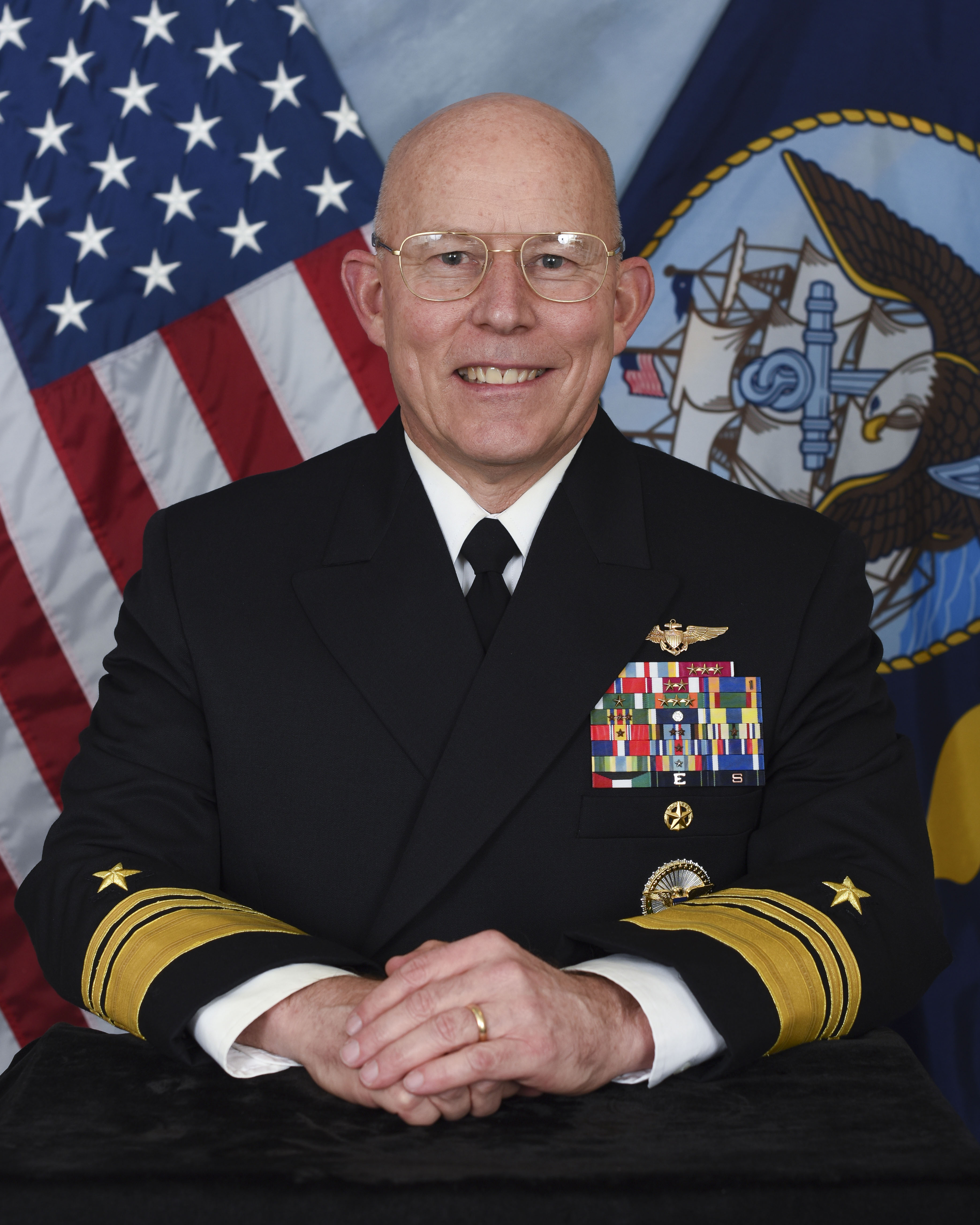
- Born: September 5, 1959 (age 67); Annapolis, Maryland, U.S.
- Military career
- Allegiance: United States
- Branch: United States Navy
- Service years: 1981–2020
- Rank: Vice Admiral
- Commands: Naval Air Forces; Carrier Strike Group 2 USS George H.W. Bush (CVN-77); USS Nashville (LPD-13)
- Conflicts: Gulf War; War in Afghanistan; Iraq War
- Awards: Navy Distinguished Service Medal; Defense Superior Service Medal; Legion of Merit (4); Bronze Star Medal

DeWolfe H. "Chip" Miller III (born 1959) is a former vice admiral in the United States Navy who retired as the Commander, Naval Air Forces (aka "the Air Boss"), which is also Type Commander (TYCOM) for all United States Navy aviation units, and dual-hatted as Commander, Naval Air Force, Pacific.

== Personal life ==
Miller is a native of Annapolis, Maryland, and grew up in York, Pennsylvania. He is a 1977 graduate of York Suburban High School.

== Naval career ==
Miller graduated from the United States Naval Academy in 1981. His operational assignments include Training Squadron (VT) 19 in Meridian, Mississippi; Attack Squadron (VA) 56 aboard USS Midway; Strike Fighter Squadron (VFA) 25 on USS Constellation (CV 64); VFA-131 and VFA-34 both aboard USS Dwight D. Eisenhower (CVN-69); executive officer of USS Carl Vinson (CVN-70); commanding officer of USS Nashville (LPD-13); commanding officer of USS George H.W. Bush (CVN-77) and as a flag officer, commander of Carrier Strike Group 2, participating in combat during Operation Enduring Freedom and Operation Iraqi Resolve.

Miller's shore tours include Air Test and Evaluation Squadron (VX) 5; aviation programs analyst Office of the Chief of Naval Operations (OPNAV N80); Strike Fighter Weapons School Atlantic; deputy director of naval operations at the Combined Air Operations Center during Operation Allied Force; Office of Legislative Affairs for the Secretary of Defense; aircraft carrier requirements officer for Commander, Naval Air Forces; and flag officer tours in OPNAV as director for Intelligence, Surveillance and Reconnaissance (N2N6F2); assistant deputy chief of naval operations for Warfare Systems (N9B); and most recently as director, Air Warfare (N98).

Miller became Commander, Naval Air Forces on 11 January 2018. He superseded Vice Admiral Mike Shoemaker and was relieved by Vice Admiral Kenneth R. Whitesell. Miller retired on December 1, 2020.

Miller is entitled to wear the Navy Distinguished Service Medal, Defense Superior Service Medal, Legion of Merit, Bronze Star Medal, Meritorious Service Medal, Air Medal and various other personal, unit and service awards.

== Education ==
Miller holds a Master of Science from the National Defense University, is a national security management fellow of Syracuse University, and is a graduate of the Navy’s Nuclear Power School.
