= York Suburban Senior High School =

Coordinates: 39.9486°N 76.6935°W

York Suburban High School

Location
- 1800 Hollywood Drive; York, Pennsylvania; United States

Information
- Type: Public
- Established: 1958
- Principal: Brian Ellis
- Teaching staff: 71.17 (FTE)
- Enrollment: 863 (2023–2024)
- Student to teacher ratio: 12.13
- Color
- Mascot: Trojan
- Website: https://www.yssd.org/hs/

York Suburban High School is a Middle-States accredited, comprehensive four-year high school with an enrollment of 850 students located in Spring Garden Township in the U.S. state of Pennsylvania.

== History ==
York Suburban opened its doors in September 1958 as a school housing approximately 1250 students in grades 7-12. At the time, there were 53 instructors on a team of 61 professionals. Later, the school was modified to accommodate only grades 9-12, as it does today.

== Curriculum ==
Students may select from 150 courses to fill an eight-period day (7:50 AM – 2:55 PM). There is a ninth period, called Flex, however it is only 23 minutes rather than the normal 48, and the students can use it as a time to do academic things like study or do homework. Every student has an assigned Flex period. Offerings in English, social studies, science, mathematics and foreign languages (Spanish, French, and German) are year-long courses taught at the General, College Preparatory (CP), and Honors courses. Some classes are also available at the AP level, and the fourth and fifth levels of foreign languages are taught as dual-enrollment College in High School (CHS) programs. Full year courses are awarded 1.0 credits; semester courses, 0.5. 4 years of English, 3 years of Science, Social Studies, and Mathematics, and 7 in electives including courses in health, physical education, home economics, woodworking, and computer applications are required.

== Notable alumni ==
- Steve Hoffman, former NFL coach
- Ken Ludwig, playwright and theatre director
- DeWolfe Miller III, Vice admiral and Commander, Naval Air Forces
- Todd Platts, attorney and Republican Party politician
- Evan Sharp, co-founder of Pinterest
- Craig Sheffer, film and television actor
- Nathan Keyes, film and television actor
