= York Suburban School District =

School district in Pennsylvania

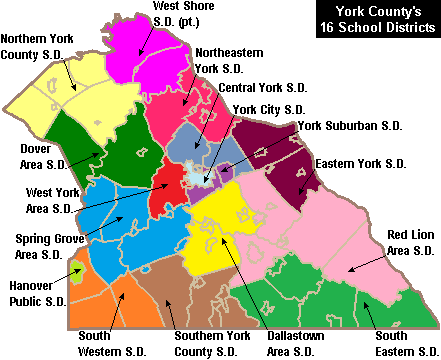

Address
- 1800 Hollywood Drive York, York County, Pennsylvania, 17403; United States
- Coordinates: 39.9616°N 76.6932°W

District information
- Type: Public

Other information
- Website: yssd.org

York Suburban School District is a midsized, suburban, public school district located in York County, Pennsylvania, (USA). It encompasses approximately 14 square miles (36 km^{2}). According to 2000 federal census data, it serves a resident population of 21,067 people. In 2010 the US Census Bureau reported a population of 21,684 people. In 2009, the District residents’ per capita income was $27,028, while the median family income was $59,192. In the Commonwealth, the median family income was $49,501 and the United States median family income was $49,445, in 2010.

York Suburban School District operates six schools: Yorkshire Elementary School (Valley View at Yorkshire), Valley View Elementary School, East York Elementary School, Indian Rock Elementary School, York Suburban Middle School, and York Suburban Senior High School. Valley View and Yorkshire consist of grades K-2. Indian Rock Elementary and East York Elementary both consist of grades 3–5. York Suburban Middle School consists of grades 6–8. York Suburban Senior High School consists of grades 9-12. The district's colors are orange and black with the Trojan as the mascot.

== Extracurriculars ==
York Suburban School District's students have access to a wide variety of clubs, activities and an extensive sports program.

=== Sports ===
The District funds:

Boys

- Baseball - AAA
- Basketball- AAA
- Cross Country - AA
- Football - AAA
- Golf - AAA
- Lacrosse - AAAA
- Soccer - AA
- Swimming and Diving - AA
- Tennis - AA
- Track and Field - AAA
- Volleyball - AA
- Wrestling - AAA

Girls

- Basketball - AAA
- Cross Country - AA
- Field Hockey - AA
- Golf - AAA
- Lacrosse - AAAA
- Soccer (Fall) - AA
- Softball - AAA
- Swimming and Diving - AA
- Girls' Tennis - AAA
- Track and Field - AAA
- Volleyball - AA

Middle School Sports

Boys

- Basketball
- Cross Country
- Football
- Track and Field
- Wrestling

Girls

- Basketball
- Cross Country
- Field Hockey
- Track and Field

According to PIAA directory July 2012
