= Violet Hill, Pennsylvania =

Unincorporated area in Pennsylvania, U.S.

Coordinates: 39°56′30″N 76°42′40″W

Violet Hill is an unincorporated area in York County, Pennsylvania, United States. This community, which is located in Spring Garden Township, is a suburb of the city of York.
