= York County, Pennsylvania =

County in Pennsylvania, United States

- County
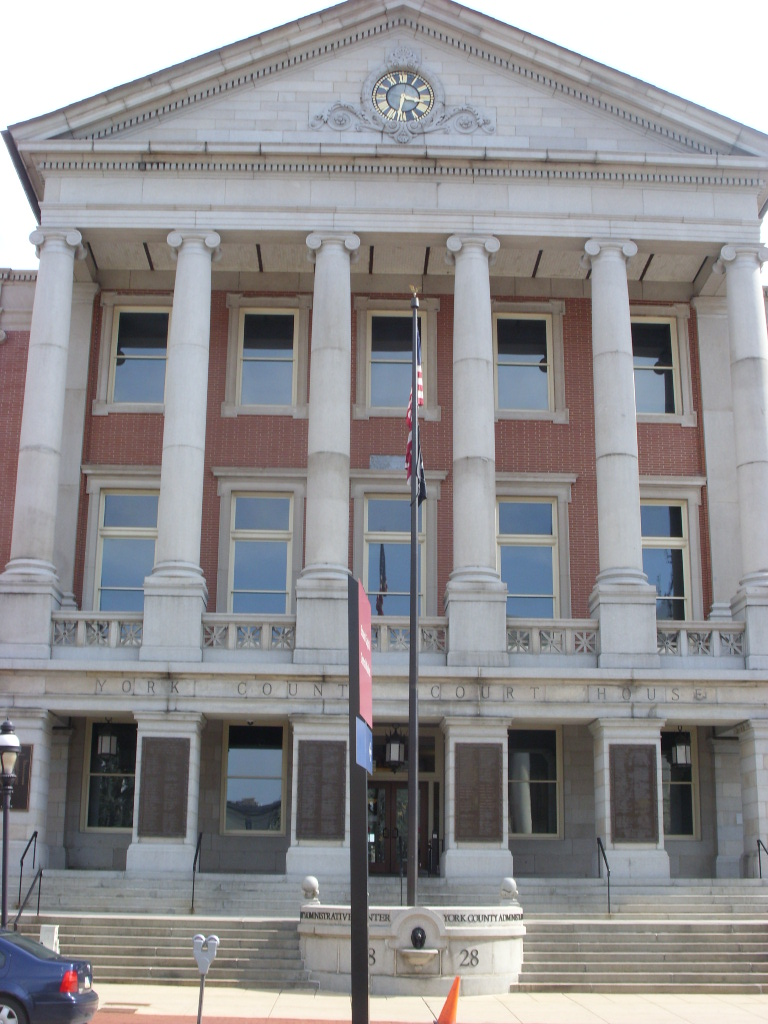
- York County Administrative Center in York, Pennsylvania

- Seal Logo

- Location within the U.S. state of Pennsylvania
- Coordinates: 39.92°N 76.73°W
- Country: United States
- State: Pennsylvania
- Founded: August 19, 1749
- Named for: Duke of York
- Seat: York
- Largest city: York

Area
  - Total: 911 sq mi (2,360 km^{2})
  - Land: 904 sq mi (2,340 km^{2})
  - Water: 6.5 sq mi (17 km^{2}) 0.7%

Population (2020)
  - Total: 456,438
  - Estimate (2025): 473,197 ▲
  - Density: 505/sq mi (195/km^{2})
- Time zone: UTC−5 (Eastern)
  - Summer (DST): UTC−4 (EDT)
- Congressional districts: 10th, 11th
- Website: yorkcountypa.gov

York County is a county in the Commonwealth of Pennsylvania, United States. As of the 2020 census, the population was 456,438. Its county seat is York. The county was created on August 19, 1749, from part of Lancaster County and named either after the Duke of York, an early patron of the Penn family, or for the city and county of York in England. The county is part of the South Central region of the state. (Note: Includes Lancaster, York, Berks, Dauphin, Cumberland, Franklin, Lebanon, Adams and Perry Counties)

York County comprises the York-Hanover, Pennsylvania Metropolitan Statistical Area, which is also included in the Harrisburg-York-Lebanon, Pennsylvania combined statistical area. It is in the Susquehanna Valley, a large fertile agricultural region in South Central Pennsylvania.

Based on the Articles of Confederation having been adopted in York by the Second Continental Congress on November 15, 1777, the local government and business community began referring to York in the 1960s as the first capital of the United States of America. The designation has been debated by historians ever since. Congress considered York and the borough of Wrightsville on the eastern side of York County along the Susquehanna River as the nation's permanent capital before Washington, D.C., was selected.

York County is home to Martin's Potato Chips in Thomasville; Utz Quality Foods, Inc., Snyder's of Hanover, and Hanover Foods in Hanover; Gibble's Potato Chips, and Wolfgang Candy in York; the Emigsville Band in Emigsville; a major manufacturing branch of Harley-Davidson Motor Company, the York International brand of refrigeration/HVAC equipment, and York Barbell. York was the home of The Bon-Ton from 1898 to 2018, and Dentsply Sirona until 2019.

== Geography ==
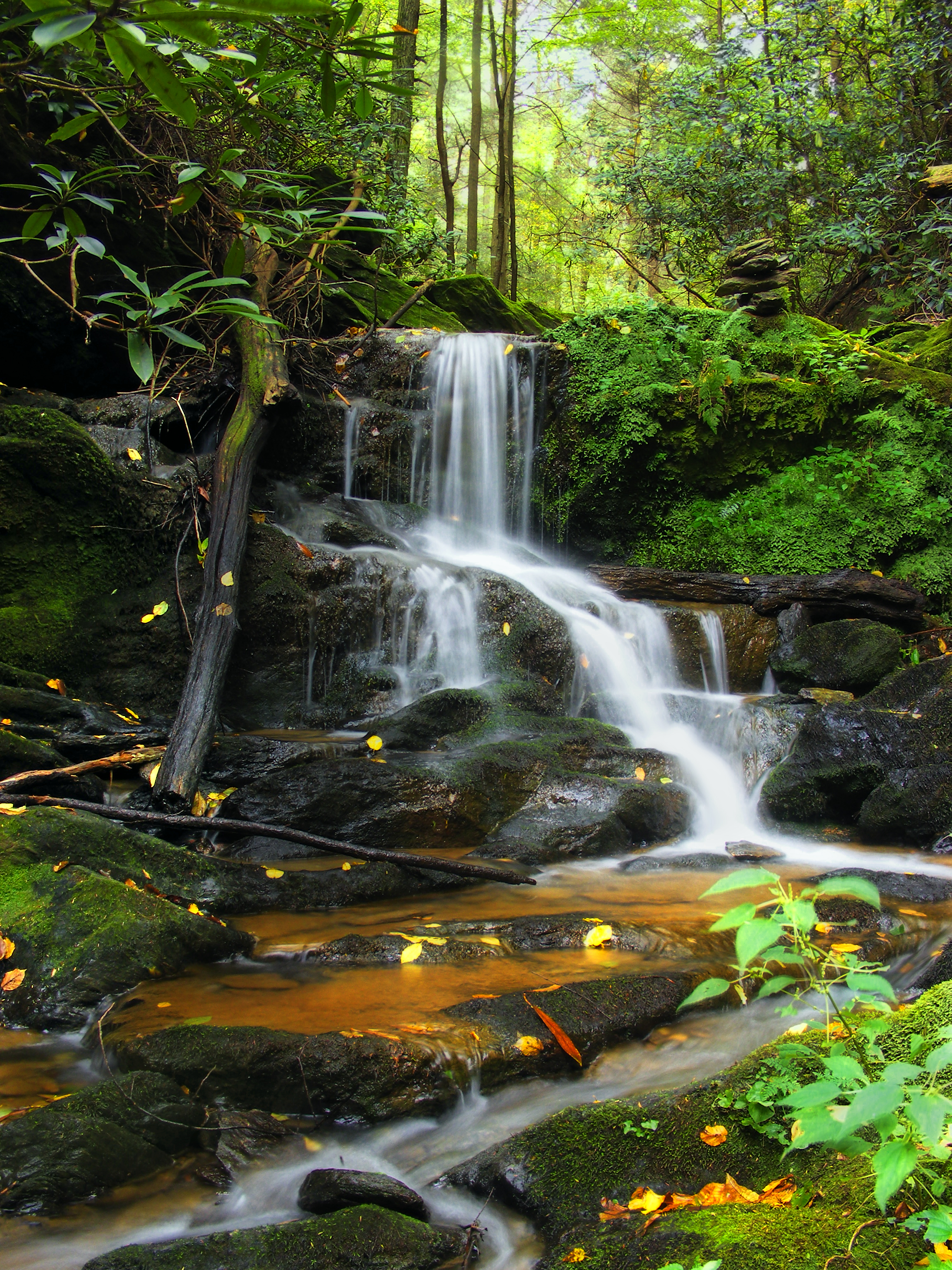
An Oakland Run waterfall near the Mason-Dixon Trail in southeast York County in October 2009

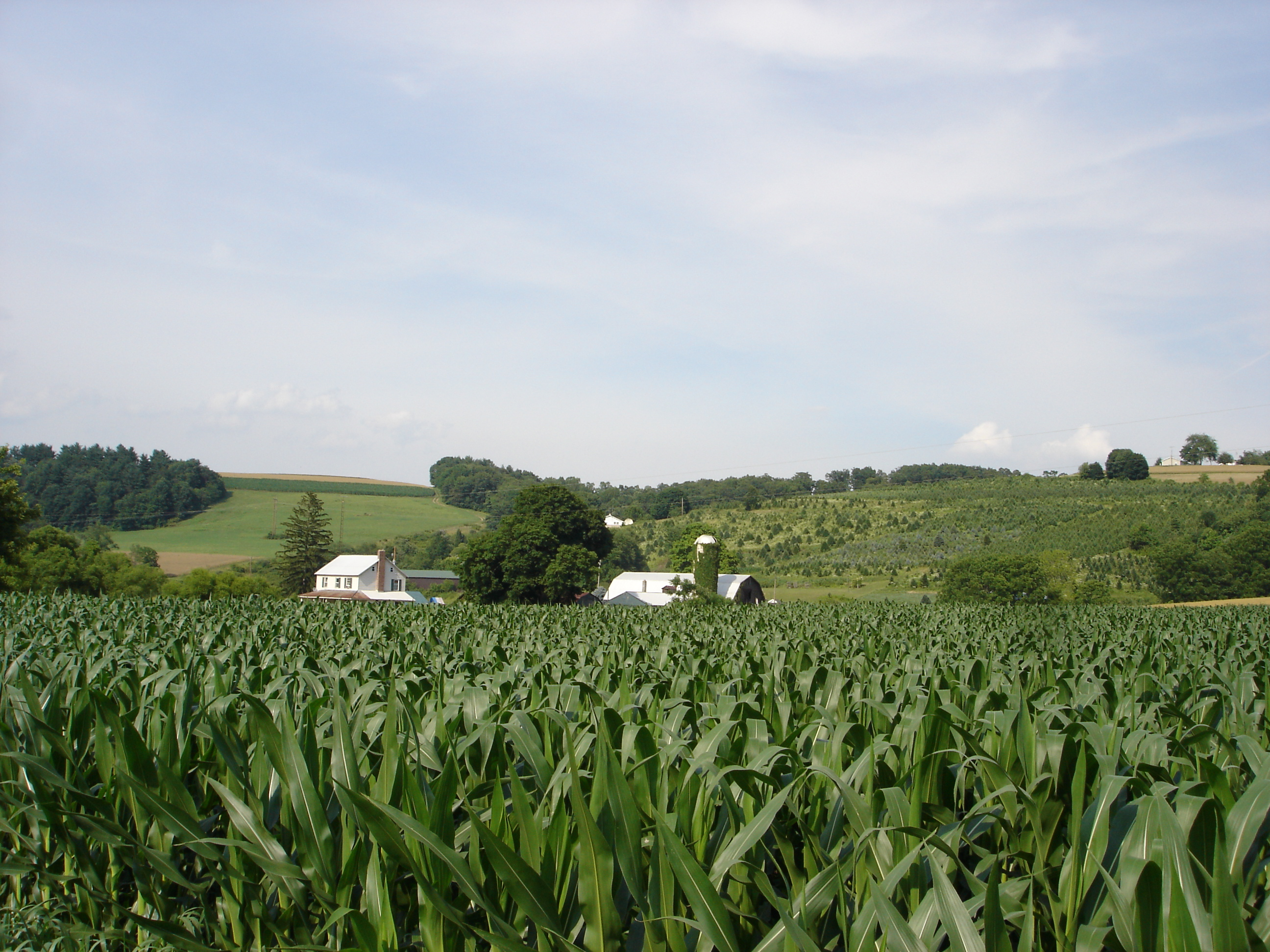
A farm in York County in June 2007

According to the U.S. Census Bureau, the county has a total area of 911 square miles (2,360 km^{2}), of which 904 square miles (2,340 km^{2}) is land and 6.5 square miles (17 km^{2}) (0.7%) is water. The county is bound to its eastern border by the Susquehanna River. Its southern border is the Mason–Dixon line, which separates Pennsylvania and Maryland. Within the U.S. piedmont region, York County is generally hilly and rises to the Blue Ridge Mountains in the northwest, where it is bordered by Yellow Breeches Creek. Interior waterways include Codorus and Conewago Creeks, and Lakes Lehman, Kiwanis, Marburg, Pahagaco, Pinchot, Redman, and Williams.

=== Adjacent counties ===
- Cumberland County (north)
- Dauphin County (northeast)
- Lancaster County (east)
- Harford County, Maryland (southeast)
- Baltimore County, Maryland (south)
- Carroll County, Maryland (southwest)
- Adams County (west)

=== Major roads and highways ===
- I-76 / Penna Turnpike
- I-83
- I-83 BL
- US 15
- US 30
- PA 24
- PA 74
- PA 94
- PA 114
- PA 116
- PA 124
- PA 177
- PA 181
- PA 182
- PA 194
- PA 214
- PA 216
- PA 234
- PA 238
- PA 262
- PA 297
- PA 372
- PA 382
- PA 392
- PA 425
- PA 462
- PA 516
- PA 616
- PA 624
- PA 851
- PA 921

=== Climate ===
Most of York County has a hot-summer humid continental climate (Dfa) and the hardiness zones are 6b and 7a. The latest temperature averages show some low-lying eastern areas of the county to have a humid subtropical climate (Cfa.)

Climate data for York, Pennsylvania (1991-2020 normals)
Month	Jan	Feb	Mar	Apr	May	Jun	Jul	Aug	Sep	Oct	Nov	Dec	Year
Mean daily maximum °F (°C)	41.2 (5.1)	45.3 (7.4)	54.5 (12.5)	67.2 (19.6)	76.5 (24.7)	83.9 (28.8)	87.7 (30.9)	86.0 (30.0)	79.7 (26.5)	68.2 (20.1)	55.7 (13.2)	44.9 (7.2)	65.9 (18.8)
Daily mean °F (°C)	31.2 (−0.4)	34.3 (1.3)	42.4 (5.8)	53.6 (12.0)	63.1 (17.3)	71.2 (21.8)	75.4 (24.1)	73.8 (23.2)	67.1 (19.5)	55.6 (13.1)	44.4 (6.9)	35.5 (1.9)	54.0 (12.2)
Mean daily minimum °F (°C)	21.3 (−5.9)	23.2 (−4.9)	30.2 (−1.0)	40.0 (4.4)	49.7 (9.8)	58.5 (14.7)	63.1 (17.3)	61.5 (16.4)	54.5 (12.5)	43.0 (6.1)	33.1 (0.6)	26.1 (−3.3)	42.0 (5.6)
Average precipitation inches (mm)	3.27 (83)	2.81 (71)	4.01 (102)	3.62 (92)	4.20 (107)	4.29 (109)	4.52 (115)	3.96 (101)	5.10 (130)	3.94 (100)	3.22 (82)	3.52 (89)	46.46 (1,180)
Average snowfall inches (cm)	8.5 (22)	8.2 (21)	3.9 (9.9)	0.2 (0.51)	0.0 (0.0)	0.0 (0.0)	0.0 (0.0)	0.0 (0.0)	0.0 (0.0)	0.0 (0.0)	0.5 (1.3)	3.3 (8.4)	24.6 (62)
Average precipitation days (≥ 0.01 in)	10.3	9.6	11.6	11.6	12.7	12.0	11.0	9.6	9.6	8.4	10.0	10.5	126.9
Average snowy days (≥ 0.1 in)	3.3	3.0	1.7	0.2	0.0	0.0	0.0	0.0	0.0	0.0	0.3	1.5	10.0
Source: NOAA

Climate data for Harrisburg, Pennsylvania (Harrisburg Capital City Airport) 1991-2020 normals (Records 1939-2021)
Month	Jan	Feb	Mar	Apr	May	Jun	Jul	Aug	Sep	Oct	Nov	Dec	Year
Record high °F (°C)	73 (23)	83 (28)	86 (30)	93 (34)	97 (36)	100 (38)	107 (42)	101 (38)	102 (39)	97 (36)	84 (29)	75 (24)	107 (42)
Mean daily maximum °F (°C)	40.3 (4.6)	43.2 (6.2)	52.6 (11.4)	64.9 (18.3)	74.7 (23.7)	83.2 (28.4)	87.6 (30.9)	85.4 (29.7)	78.6 (25.9)	66.7 (19.3)	55.1 (12.8)	44.4 (6.9)	64.7 (18.2)
Daily mean °F (°C)	32.6 (0.3)	34.7 (1.5)	43.2 (6.2)	54.1 (12.3)	64.0 (17.8)	73.0 (22.8)	77.5 (25.3)	75.4 (24.1)	68.5 (20.3)	56.7 (13.7)	46.0 (7.8)	37.0 (2.8)	55.2 (12.9)
Mean daily minimum °F (°C)	24.9 (−3.9)	26.2 (−3.2)	33.9 (1.1)	43.3 (6.3)	53.2 (11.8)	62.8 (17.1)	67.4 (19.7)	65.5 (18.6)	58.4 (14.7)	46.7 (8.2)	37.0 (2.8)	29.5 (−1.4)	45.7 (7.6)
Record low °F (°C)	−9 (−23)	−5 (−21)	2 (−17)	19 (−7)	31 (−1)	40 (4)	49 (9)	45 (7)	30 (−1)	23 (−5)	13 (−11)	−8 (−22)	−9 (−23)
Average precipitation inches (mm)	2.64 (67)	2.36 (60)	3.35 (85)	3.70 (94)	3.48 (88)	3.72 (94)	4.30 (109)	3.68 (93)	4.12 (105)	3.68 (93)	2.80 (71)	3.15 (80)	40.98 (1,041)
Average precipitation days (≥ 0.01 in)	9	9	10	12	14	12	12	11	10	11	9	10	127
Source: NOAA

== Demographics ==
Historical population
Census	Pop.	Note	%±
1790	37,535		—
1800	25,643		−31.7%
1810	31,958		24.6%
1820	38,759		21.3%
1830	42,859		10.6%
1840	47,010		9.7%
1850	57,450		22.2%
1860	68,200		18.7%
1870	76,134		11.6%
1880	87,841		15.4%
1890	99,489		13.3%
1900	116,413		17.0%
1910	136,405		17.2%
1920	144,521		5.9%
1930	167,135		15.6%
1940	178,022		6.5%
1950	202,737		13.9%
1960	238,336		17.6%
1970	272,603		14.4%
1980	312,963		14.8%
1990	339,574		8.5%
2000	381,751		12.4%
2010	434,972		13.9%
2020	456,438		4.9%
2025 (est.)	473,197	▲	3.7%
U.S. Decennial Census; 1790–1960 1900–1990; 1990–2000 2010–2019

=== Racial and ethnic composition ===
York County, Pennsylvania – Racial and ethnic composition Note: the US Census treats Hispanic/Latino as an ethnic category. This table excludes Latinos from the racial categories and assigns them to a separate category. Hispanics/Latinos may be of any race.
Race / Ethnicity (NH = Non-Hispanic)	Pop 1980	Pop 1990	Pop 2000	Pop 2010	Pop 2020	% 1980	% 1990	% 2000	% 2010	% 2020
White alone (NH)	299,407	321,249	349,456	374,779	365,353	95.67%	94.60%	91.54%	86.16%	80.04%
Black or African American alone (NH)	8,968	10,558	13,515	22,493	25,768	2.87%	3.11%	3.54%	5.17%	5.65%
Native American or Alaska Native alone (NH)	217	388	568	635	640	0.07%	0.11%	0.15%	0.15%	0.14%
Asian alone (NH)	1,112	2,053	3,250	5,336	6,557	0.36%	0.60%	0.85%	1.23%	1.44%
Native Hawaiian or Pacific Islander alone (NH)	x	x	97	108	118	x	x	0.03%	0.02%	0.03%
Other race alone (NH)	559	161	278	609	1,768	0.18%	0.05%	0.07%	0.14%	0.39%
Mixed race or Multiracial (NH)	x	x	3,291	6,615	16,874	x	x	0.86%	1.52%	3.70%
Hispanic or Latino (any race)	2,700	5,165	11,296	24,397	39,360	0.86%	1.52%	2.96%	5.61%	8.62%
Total	312,963	339,574	381,751	434,972	456,438	100.00%	100.00%	100.00%	100.00%	100.00%

=== 2020 census ===
As of the 2020 census, the county had a population of 456,438. The median age was 41.4 years. 21.9% of residents were under the age of 18 and 18.4% of residents were 65 years of age or older. For every 100 females there were 97.4 males, and for every 100 females age 18 and over there were 95.0 males age 18 and over.

The racial makeup of the county was 81.8% White, 6.1% Black or African American, 0.2% American Indian and Alaska Native, 1.5% Asian, <0.1% Native Hawaiian and Pacific Islander, 4.1% from some other race, and 6.3% from two or more races. Hispanic or Latino residents of any race comprised 8.6% of the population.

71.5% of residents lived in urban areas, while 28.5% lived in rural areas.

There were 177,553 households in the county, of which 30.0% had children under the age of 18 living in them. Of all households, 51.9% were married-couple households, 16.5% were households with a male householder and no spouse or partner present, and 23.6% were households with a female householder and no spouse or partner present. About 24.9% of all households were made up of individuals and 11.1% had someone living alone who was 65 years of age or older.

There were 187,187 housing units, of which 5.1% were vacant. Among occupied housing units, 73.6% were owner-occupied and 26.4% were renter-occupied. The homeowner vacancy rate was 1.2% and the rental vacancy rate was 6.5%.

=== 2000 census ===
As of the 2000 census, there were 381,751 people, 148,219 households, and 105,531 families residing in the county. The population density was 422 people per square mile (163 people/km^{2}). There were 156,720 housing units at an average density of 173 units per square mile (67/km^{2}). The racial makeup of the county was 92.76% White, 3.69% African American, 0.18% Native American, 0.86% Asian, 0.03% Pacific Islander, 1.39% from other races, and 1.10% from two or more races. Hispanic or Latino people of any race were 2.96% of the population. 42.0% were of German, 12.6% American, 7.7% Irish, 6.4% English and 5.1% Italian ancestry. 94.8% spoke English and 2.9% Spanish as their first language.

There were 148,219 households, out of which 32.50% had children under the age of 18 living with them, 58.30% were married couples living together, 9.00% had a female householder with no husband present, and 28.80% were non-families. 23.30% of all households were made up of individuals, and 9.20% had someone living alone who was 65 years of age or older. The average household size was 2.52 and the average family size was 2.98.

In the county, the population was spread out, with 24.60% under the age of 18, 7.50% from 18 to 24, 30.30% from 25 to 44, 24.00% from 45 to 64, and 13.50% who were 65 years of age or older. The median age was 38 years. For every 100 females there were 96.70 males. For every 100 females age 18 and over, there were 93.80 males.

As of 2006, the York-Hanover Metropolitan Statistical Area was the fastest-growing metro area in the Northeast region, and was ranked among the fastest-growing in the nation, according to the "2006 Population Estimates for Metropolitan and Micropolitan Statistical Areas" (U.S. Census Bureau). The estimates listed York-Hanover as the 95th fastest-growing metro area in the nation, increasing 9.1 percent between 2000 and 2006.

York city had a 77.3 percent increase in the number of residents of Hispanic or Latino origin, based on a comparison of the 2000 and 2010 U.S. census results. The city's 30.9 percent Hispanic population (as of December 2017) is more than that of other places in the area.

=== Dialect ===
The Central Pennsylvania accent and the Susquehanna dialect are the two most commonly heard speech patterns in the county. Many people of Pennsylvania Dutch descent also inhabit the county, who tend to speak with a Pennsylvania Dutch English dialect.

== Metropolitan statistical area ==
The U.S. Office of Management and Budget has designated York County as the York–Hanover, PA metropolitan statistical area (MSA). The United States Census Bureau ranked the York–Hanover, PA Metropolitan Statistical Area as the 9th most populous in the state of Pennsylvania, and 115th most populous MSA in the United States as of July 1, 2012.

The Office of Management and Budget has further designated the York–Hanover MSA as a component of the more extensive Harrisburg–York–Lebanon combined statistical area (CSA), the 43rd most populous CSA and the 49th most populous primary statistical area of the United States as of July 1, 2012. As of the 2017 estimates, the CSA's 1.26 million people ranks 5th in the state of Pennsylvania.

== Politics and government ==
Prior to 1952, York County was a Democratic stronghold in presidential elections, voting majority Republican only four times before then. Between the founding of the party in 1828 and 1900, the county voted Democratic every time, one of only a handful of counties in Pennsylvania to do so. Starting with the 1952 election, it has become a Republican stronghold with Lyndon Johnson being the lone Democrat to win the county since. Since then, Jimmy Carter in 1976 and Barack Obama in 2008 are the only Democratic presidential candidates who have received over 40% of the county's vote, and George H. W. Bush in 1992 is the only Republican not to win a majority. Republicans overtook Democrats in voter registration between 1980 and 1984. The only real pockets of Democratic support are in the city of York and neighboring Spring Garden Township.

United States presidential election results for York County, Pennsylvania
Year	Republican		Democratic		Third party(ies)	
Year	No.	%	No.	%	No.	%
1880	7,870	40.43%	11,581	59.49%	17	0.09%
1884	8,014	40.68%	11,552	58.65%	132	0.67%
1888	9,047	41.68%	12,359	56.94%	301	1.39%
1892	9,052	40.59%	12,822	57.50%	426	1.91%
1896	12,258	47.04%	13,054	50.09%	748	2.87%
1900	12,327	46.29%	13,732	51.56%	572	2.15%
1904	14,837	51.85%	12,996	45.42%	781	2.73%
1908	14,610	47.48%	15,171	49.30%	990	3.22%
1912	5,251	17.39%	14,979	49.61%	9,965	33.00%
1916	12,276	40.12%	16,314	53.32%	2,008	6.56%
1920	19,879	55.72%	14,396	40.35%	1,404	3.94%
1924	23,044	56.15%	15,600	38.01%	2,395	5.84%
1928	45,791	79.60%	11,216	19.50%	522	0.91%
1932	25,430	44.33%	29,313	51.10%	2,622	4.57%
1936	29,233	38.55%	45,142	59.53%	1,462	1.93%
1940	30,228	43.22%	39,543	56.54%	165	0.24%
1944	32,617	45.84%	38,226	53.72%	315	0.44%
1948	32,494	47.31%	33,321	48.52%	2,863	4.17%
1952	44,489	52.74%	39,508	46.84%	354	0.42%
1956	48,176	55.33%	38,743	44.50%	149	0.17%
1960	55,922	58.57%	39,164	41.02%	393	0.41%
1964	33,677	36.26%	58,787	63.30%	408	0.44%
1968	51,631	55.30%	33,328	35.69%	8,412	9.01%
1972	63,606	68.19%	27,520	29.50%	2,154	2.31%
1976	56,912	56.94%	41,281	41.30%	1,751	1.75%
1980	61,098	59.96%	33,406	32.79%	7,387	7.25%
1984	75,020	68.67%	33,359	30.54%	868	0.79%
1988	72,408	65.16%	37,691	33.92%	1,017	0.92%
1992	60,130	44.79%	46,113	34.35%	28,002	20.86%
1996	65,188	50.87%	49,596	38.70%	13,372	10.43%
2000	87,652	60.75%	51,958	36.01%	4,676	3.24%
2004	114,270	63.74%	63,701	35.53%	1,298	0.72%
2008	109,268	55.95%	82,839	42.42%	3,179	1.63%
2012	113,304	59.63%	73,191	38.52%	3,510	1.85%
2016	128,528	61.78%	68,524	32.94%	10,977	5.28%
2020	146,733	61.36%	88,114	36.85%	4,299	1.80%
2024	154,884	61.92%	91,926	36.75%	3,326	1.33%

United States Senate election results for York County, Pennsylvania1
Year	Republican		Democratic		Third party(ies)	
Year	No.	%	No.	%	No.	%
1994	56,742	59.53%	34,691	36.40%	3,884	4.07%
2000	88,792	64.21%	46,093	33.33%	3,397	2.46%
2006	69,271	55.09%	56,470	44.91%	0	0.00%
2012	108,021	57.57%	74,681	39.80%	4,941	2.63%
2018	95,814	56.76%	69,272	41.03%	3,726	2.21%
2024	148,098	59.73%	91,779	37.02%	8,051	3.25%

United States Senate election results for York County, Pennsylvania3
Year	Republican		Democratic		Third party(ies)	
Year	No.	%	No.	%	No.	%
1992	68,424	53.28%	52,828	41.14%	7,171	5.58%
1998	57,107	68.77%	22,395	26.97%	3,543	4.27%
2004	108,665	63.16%	51,603	29.99%	11,778	6.85%
2010	88,394	67.77%	42,039	32.23%	0	0.00%
2016	126,350	61.33%	69,394	33.68%	10,271	4.99%
2022	109,631	58.77%	71,929	38.56%	4,991	2.68%

Pennsylvania Gubernatorial election results for York County
Year	Republican		Democratic		Third party(ies)	
Year	No.	%	No.	%	No.	%
1970	34,292	46.64%	35,768	48.65%	3,464	4.71%
1974	35,799	49.03%	36,444	49.92%	765	1.05%
1978	44,759	60.48%	28,621	38.67%	625	0.84%
1982	48,364	59.81%	31,853	39.39%	650	0.80%
1986	45,733	59.53%	30,301	39.44%	788	1.03%
1990	23,440	29.00%	57,394	71.00%	0	0.00%
1994	49,278	49.65%	31,013	31.25%	18,960	19.10%
1998	62,657	72.47%	16,825	19.46%	6,983	8.08%
2002	63,894	63.94%	33,248	33.27%	2,779	2.78%
2006	70,592	56.08%	55,276	43.92%	0	0.00%
2010	92,483	70.86%	38,034	29.14%	0	0.00%
2014	69,604	57.06%	52,386	42.94%	0	0.00%
2018	90,590	53.61%	75,313	44.57%	3,075	1.82%
2022	98,622	52.89%	83,649	44.86%	4,205	2.25%

According to the Secretary of State's office, a majority of voters in York County are registered as Republicans. As of March 4, 2024, there were 310,874 registered voters in the county.

- Republican: 161,672 (52.00%)
- Democratic: 96,448 (31.02%)
- Independent: 43,554 (14.01%)
- Minor parties: 9,210 (2.96%)
Chart of Voter Registration
1. Republican (52.0%)
2. Democratic (31.0%)
3. Independent (14.0%)
4. Other parties (2.96%)

=== County commissioners ===
- Julie Wheeler, President, Republican
- Scott Burford, Vice President, Republican
- Doug Hoke, Commissioner, Democrat

=== Other county offices ===
- Clerk of Courts, Dan Byrnes, Republican
- Controller, Greg Bower, Republican
- Coroner, Tania Zech, Republican
- District Attorney, Tim Barker, Republican
- Prothonotary, Allison Blew, Republican
- Recorder of Deeds, Laura Shue, Republican
- Register of Wills & Clerk of Orphans' Court, Bryan Tate, Republican
- Sheriff, Richard P. Keuerleber III, Republican
- Treasurer, Barbara Bair, Republican

=== State House of Representatives ===
District	Representative	Party
47	Joe D'Orsie	Republican
92	Dawn Keefer	Republican
93	Mike Jones	Republican
94	Wendy Fink	Republican
95	Carol Hill-Evans	Democratic
169	Kate Klunk	Republican
196	Seth Grove	Republican

=== State senate ===
District	Senator	Party
28	Kristin Phillips-Hill	Republican
31	Mike Regan	Republican

=== United States House of Representatives ===
District	Representative	Party
10	Scott Perry	Republican
11	Lloyd Smucker	Republican

=== United States Senate ===
Senator	Party
Dave McCormick	Republican
John Fetterman	Democratic

== Education ==
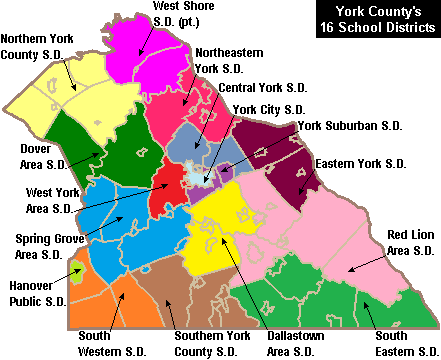
Map of York County's public school districts

=== Public school districts ===
School districts include:

- Central York School District
- Dallastown Area School District
- Dover Area School District
- Eastern York School District
- Hanover Public School District
- Northeastern York School District
- Northern York County School District
- Red Lion Area School District
- South Eastern School District
- South Western School District
- Southern York County School District
- Spring Grove Area School District
- West Shore School District
- West York Area School District
- York City School District
- York Suburban School District

=== Vocational school ===
- York County School of Technology

=== Public charter schools ===
- Crispus Attucks Youthbuild Charter School (K–6) – York
- Helen Thackston Charter School (6–12) – York
- Lincoln Charter School (K–5) – York
- New Hope Academy Charter School (K–6) – York
- York Academy Regional Charter School (K–12)
- York Adams Academy (formerly York County High School)

=== Independent schools ===
- Christian School of York (PreK–12)
- Keystone Christian Academy York (K–8)
- Logos Academy York (K–12)
- St. Joseph School Hanover (PreK–8)
- St. Joseph School (PreK–6)
- St. John the Baptist Catholic School New Freedom (PreK–6)
- Shrewsbury Christian Academy New Freedom (PreK–8)
- Tidings of Peace Christian School York (K–12)
- York Catholic High School (7–12)
- York Country Day School (PreK–12)

=== Intermediate Unit ===
Lincoln Intermediate Unit (IU#12) region includes Adams County, Franklin County and York County. The agency offers school districts, home schooled students and private schools many services including: special education services, combined purchasing, and instructional technology services. It runs Summer Academy which offers both art and academic strands designed to meet the individual needs of gifted, talented and high achieving students. Additional services include: Curriculum Mapping, Professional Development for school employees, Adult Education, Nonpublic School Services, Business Services, Migrant & ESL (English as a Second Language), Instructional Services, Management Services, and Technology Services. It also provides a GED program to adults who want to earn a high school diploma and literacy programs. The Lincoln Intermediate Unit is governed by a 13-member Board of Directors, each a member of a local school board from the 25 school districts. Board members are elected by school directors of all 25 school districts for three-year terms that begin the first day of July. There are 29 intermediate units in Pennsylvania. They are funded by school districts, state and federal program specific funding and grants. IUs do not have the power to tax.

=== Colleges and universities ===
- Pennsylvania State University, Penn State York campus
- Harrisburg Area Community College – York Campus
- The Art Institute of York (closed September 23, 2017)
- York College of Pennsylvania
- YTI Career Institute (YTI = York Technical Institute)
- Yorktowne Business Institute (closed 2015)

=== Adult education ===
- YTI Career Institute
- Motorcycle Technology Center
- York Time Institute

== Communities ==
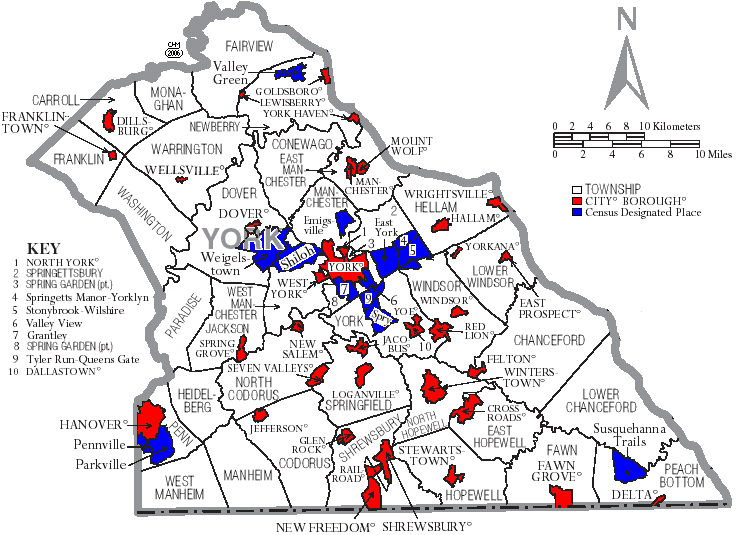
Map of York County with municipal labels showing cities and boroughs (in red), townships (in white), and census-designated places (in blue)

Under Pennsylvania law, there are four types of incorporated municipalities: cities, boroughs, townships, and, in only one case, towns. York County has 72 of these. The following cities (1), boroughs (36) and townships (35) are in York County:

=== City ===
- York (county seat)

=== Boroughs ===
- Cross Roads
- Dallastown
- Delta
- Dillsburg
- Dover
- East Prospect
- Fawn Grove
- Felton
- Franklintown
- Glen Rock
- Goldsboro
- Hallam
- Hanover
- Jacobus
- Jefferson
- Lewisberry
- Loganville
- Manchester
- Mount Wolf
- New Freedom
- New Salem
- North York
- Railroad
- Red Lion
- Seven Valleys
- Shrewsbury
- Spring Grove
- Stewartstown
- Wellsville
- West York
- Windsor
- Winterstown
- Wrightsville
- Yoe
- York Haven
- Yorkana

=== Townships ===
- Carroll
- Chanceford
- Codorus
- Conewago
- Dover
- East Hopewell
- East Manchester
- Fairview
- Fawn
- Franklin
- Heidelberg
- Hellam
- Hopewell
- Jackson
- Lower Chanceford
- Lower Windsor
- Manchester
- Manheim
- Monaghan
- Newberry
- North Codorus
- North Hopewell
- Paradise
- Peach Bottom
- Penn
- Shrewsbury
- Spring Garden
- Springettsbury
- Springfield
- Warrington
- Washington
- West Manchester
- West Manheim
- Windsor
- York

=== Census-designated places ===
Census-designated places are unincorporated communities designated by the U.S. Census Bureau for the purposes of compiling demographic data. They are not actual jurisdictions under Pennsylvania law.

- East York
- Emigsville
- Grantley
- New Market
- Parkville
- Pennville
- Pleasureville
- Queens Gate
- Shiloh
- Spry
- Stonybrook
- Susquehanna Trails
- Tyler Run
- Valley Green
- Valley View
- Weigelstown
- Yorklyn

=== Other unincorporated communities ===
- Accomac
- Admire
- Airville
- Ambau
- Andersontown
- Bandanna
- Bermudian
- Big Mountain
- Blackrock
- Bridgeville
- Brogue
- Bryansville
- Cly
- Craley
- Codorus Furnace
- Conewago Heights
- Davidsburg
- Detters Mill
- Etters
- Fayfield
- Fireside Terrace
- Foustown
- Fuhrmans Mill
- Gatchellville
- Glades
- Glenville
- Gnatstown
- Hametown
- Hanover Junction
- Hopewell Center
- Kralltown
- Leaders Heights
- Leibharts Corner
- Lockport (under Lake Clarke)
- Mount Royal
- Muddy Creek Forks
- New Bridgeville
- New Park
- Nauvoo
- Ore Valley
- Porters Sideling
- Reesers Summit
- Rossville
- Saginaw
- Shenks Ferry
- Siddonsburg
- Spring Forge
- Starview
- Stoverstown
- Strickler
- Strinestown
- Sunnyburn
- Thomasville
- Tolna
- Valley Forge
- Violet Hill
- Wago Junction
- Woodbine
- Yocumtown
- York Furnace

=== Population ranking ===
The population ranking of the following table is based on the 2010 census of York County.

† county seat

Rank	City/town/etc.	Municipal type	Population (2010 Census)
1	† York	City	43,718
2	Hanover	Borough	15,289
3	Weigelstown	CDP	12,875
4	Shiloh	CDP	11,218
5	East York	CDP	8,777
6	Parkville	CDP	6,706
7	Red Lion	Borough	6,373
8	Spry	CDP	4,891
9	West York	Borough	4,617
10	New Freedom	Borough	4,464
11	Dallastown	Borough	4,049
12	Shrewsbury	Borough	3,823
13	Grantley	CDP	3,628
14	Valley Green	CDP	3,429
15	Valley View	CDP	2,817
16	Manchester	Borough	2,763
17	Hallam	Borough	2,673
18	Emigsville	CDP	2,672
19	Dillsburg	Borough	2,563
20	Stonybrook	CDP	2,384
21	Wrightsville	Borough	2,310
22	Susquehanna Trails	CDP	2,264
23	Spring Grove	Borough	2,167
24	Stewartstown	Borough	2,089
25	Glen Rock	Borough	2,025
26	Dover	Borough	2,007
27	Pennville	CDP	1,947
28	North York	Borough	1,914
29	Yorklyn	CDP	1,912
30	Tyler Run	CDP	1,901
31	Jacobus	Borough	1,841
32	Queens Gate	CDP	1,464
33	Mount Wolf	Borough	1,393
34	Windsor	Borough	1,319
35	Loganville	Borough	1,240
36	Yoe	Borough	1,018
37	Goldsboro	Borough	952
38	East Prospect	Borough	905
39	New Market	CDP	816
40	Jefferson	Borough	733
41	Delta	Borough	728
42	York Haven	Borough	709
43	Winterstown	Borough	632
44	New Salem	Borough	579
45	Seven Valleys	Borough	517
46	Cross Roads	Borough	512
47	Felton	Borough	506
48	Franklintown	Borough	489
49	Fawn Grove	Borough	452
50	Lewisberry	Borough	362
51	Railroad	Borough	278
52	Wellsville	Borough	242
53	Yorkana	Borough	229

== Airports ==
Although York County has no scheduled passenger air service, it has two general-aviation airports: Capital City Airport in Fairview Township in the extreme north and York Airport near Thomasville, just south of US 30. The county participates in the Susquehanna Area Regional Airport Authority with Adams, Cumberland, Dauphin, and Franklin counties. The closest passenger service is at Harrisburg International Airport, Lancaster County Airport, and BWI.

== Notable people ==
- John Andrews, United States Navy sailor awarded the Medal of Honor for actions during the Korean Expedition in 1872; born in York County
- Caitlan Coleman, a hostage in Afghanistan for five years, during which time she gave birth to four children
- Jacob L. Devers, four-star lieutenant general during World War II; commanded the 6th Army Group during the invasion of southern France known as Operation Dragoon
- Hali Flickinger, Olympic swimmer
- Halestorm, rock band hailing from Red Lion
- Mike Hawthorne, comic book artist known for his work on books such as Deadpool
- Bob Hoffman, founder of York Barbell, U.S. weightlifter named "Father of World Weightlifting" by the International Weightlifting Federation
- Steve Hoffman, former NFL coach
- Brian Keene, best-selling novelist
- James Kelly, member of the United States House of Representatives 1805–1809
- Jeff Koons, artist and sculptor
- Tina Kotek, Oregon politician who attended high school in Dallastown
- John Kuhn, NFL football player
- George M. Leader, 36th governor of Pennsylvania
- Live, popular rock band of the 1990s
- Ken Ludwig, playwright and theatre director
- Del McCoury, raised in York County; leader of the Grammy award-winning bluegrass Del McCoury Band; his sons, Ronnie McCoury and Rob McCoury, graduates of Susquehannock High School, also play in the band
- DeWolfe Miller III, vice admiral and Commander, Naval Air Forces
- Cameron Mitchell, actor, born in Dallastown
- Todd Platts, Judge of York County Court of Common Pleas and member of the United States House of Representatives 2000–2012, Republican Party
- H. B. Reese, inventor of Reese's Peanut Butter Cups
- Evan Sharp, co-founder of Pinterest
- Jimmy Sheckard, MLB player, 1907 and 1908 World Series Champion
- Craig Sheffer, actor
- James Alonzo Stahle, member of the U.S. House of Representatives 1895–1897
- Jarace Walker, NBA basketball player who grew up in New Freedom
- Tom Wolf, 47th governor of Pennsylvania

== See also ==
- Cresap's War
- National Register of Historic Places listings in York County, Pennsylvania
- Rabbit Transit
- Rehmeyer's Hollow – location of the 1928 Hex Hollow murder
- US 30 Diner
