= Spring Garden Township, Pennsylvania =

Township in Pennsylvania, US

Coordinates: 39°56′00″N 76°43′59″W

- Township
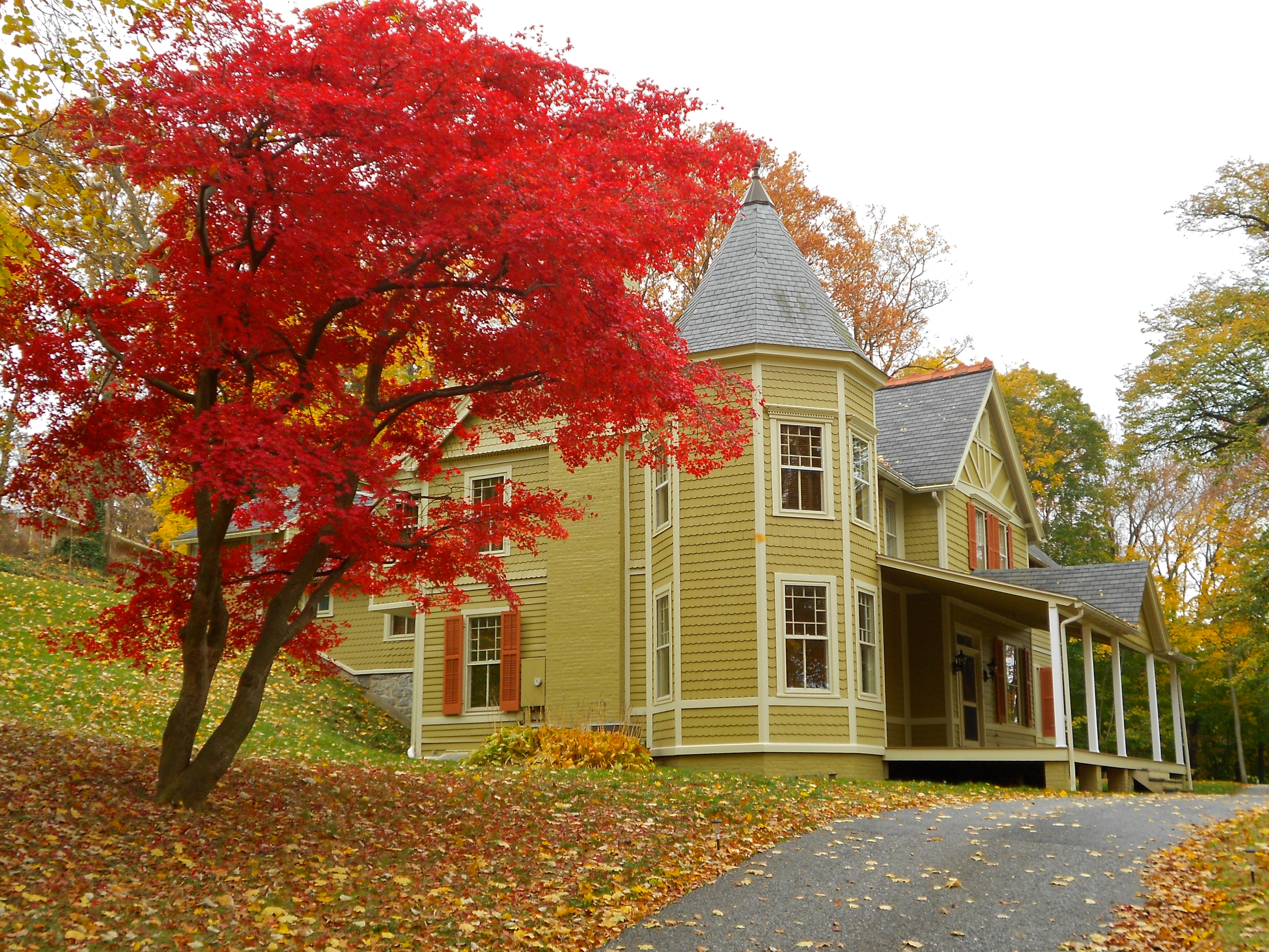
- The Nook, a historic house on Farquhar Drive

- Location in York County and the state of Pennsylvania.
- Country: United States
- State: Pennsylvania
- County: York
- Settled: 1750
- Incorporated: 1821

Government
  - Type: Board of Supervisors

Area
  - Total: 6.76 sq mi (17.51 km^{2})
  - Land: 6.74 sq mi (17.46 km^{2})
  - Water: 0.019 sq mi (0.05 km^{2})

Population (2020)
  - Total: 13,688 ▲
  - Density: 2,025/sq mi (781.9/km^{2})
- Time zone: UTC-5 (Eastern (EST))
  - Summer (DST): UTC-4 (EDT)
- Postal code: 17403
- Area code: 717
- FIPS code: 42-133-73168
- Website: Spring Garden Township official website

Historical population
Census	Pop.	Note	%±
1850	2,435		—
1860	2,932		20.4%
1870	3,040		3.7%
1880	4,110		35.2%
1890	5,209		26.7%
1900	879		−83.1%
1910	2,209		151.3%
1920	2,766		25.2%
1930	4,675		69.0%
1940	5,710		22.1%
1950	8,338		46.0%
1960	11,387		36.6%
1970	12,443		9.3%
1980	11,127		−10.6%
1990	11,207		0.7%
2000	11,974		6.8%
2010	12,578		5.0%
2020	13,688		8.8%
2023 (est.)	13,664		−0.2%
U.S. Decennial Census

Spring Garden Township is a township in York County, Pennsylvania, United States. The population was 13,688 at the 2020 census. It is adjacent to the City of York.

== History ==
The historic Francis Farquhar house, known as The Nook, was listed on the National Register of Historic Places in 1982.

== Geography ==
According to the United States Census Bureau, the township has a total area of 6.7 square miles (17 km^{2}), of which 0.04 square miles (0.10 km^{2}), or 0.30%, is water. It contains the census-designated places of Grantley and Valley View.

== Economy ==
Spring Garden Township is headquarters to York International, a Johnson Controls Company and one of the largest suppliers of HVAC systems in the United States. On February 2, 1998, a massive explosion occurred at the York International plant. A spark had set off a leak in the nearby propane storage house. The blast was felt up to 25 miles away, and blew out windows nearby as well as knocking down doors. About 20 people were injured in the blast but only one person was killed, as the explosion occurred during a shift change.

== Demographics ==
As of the census of 2020, there were 13,683 people residing in the township. The population density was 2,024.1 inhabitants per square mile (781.5/km^{2}). The racial makeup of the township was 84.0% white, 6.5% black or African American, 2.7% Asian, 1.2% Native American, and 5.6% from other races. 5.4% of the population were Hispanic or Latino of any race.

As of the census of 2010, there were 12,578 people, 4,302 households, and 3,062 families residing in the township. The population density was 1,877.3 inhabitants per square mile (724.8/km^{2}). There were 4,529 housing units at an average density of 676.0 per square mile (261.0/km^{2}). The racial makeup of the township was 91.8% White, 3.8% African American, 0.2% Native American, 1.7% Asian, 0.0% Pacific Islander, 1.0% from other races, and 1.5% from two or more races. Hispanic or Latino of any race were 3.5% of the population.

There were 4,302 households, out of which 28.5% had children under the age of 18 living with them, 57.6% were married couples living together, 10.1% had a female householder with no husband present, and 28.8% were non-families. 22.9% of all households were made up of individuals, and 9.4% had someone living alone who was 65 years of age or older. The average household size was 2.45 and the average family size was 2.88.

In the township the population was spread out, with 18.9% under the age of 18, 18.3% from 18 to 24, 20.1% from 25 to 44, 26.0% from 45 to 64, and 16.7% who were 65 years of age or older. The median age was 38.8 years. For every 100 females there were 94.1 males. Among those age 18 and over, for every 100 females there were 91.8 males.

The median income for a household in the township was $51,914, and the median income for a family was $62,982. Males had a median income of $46,478 versus $36,040 for females. The per capita income for the township was $27,334. About 10.1% of families and 13.8% of the population were below the poverty line, including 19.2% of those under age 18 and 9.5% of those age 65 or over.

== York Area United Fire and Rescue ==
In June 2004, the Springettsbury Township supervisors and the Spring Garden Township commissioners formed an ad hoc committee to consider a combined fire service. A Joint Fire Service (JFS) committee first met in May 2005 to develop a framework. In 2006, a consulting firm was hired to provide a comprehensive plan. The plan, whose development received significant assistance from the Pennsylvania Department of Community and Economic Development, was approved by the JFS committee in 2007. Both townships approved a charter amendment for creation of a fire commission to govern the new department, composed of seven commissioners drawn from the two townships. The first meeting of the York Area United Fire and Rescue Commission was held in September 2007, and a formal consolidation took place on May 5, 2008, establishing York County Company 89. In 2009, the department began selling and removing from service its excessive apparatus and replacing it with new, such as three pumpers with two 2010 models. In April 2010, the York Area United Fire and Rescue Commission and the International Association of Fire Fighters, Local 2377, signed the first joint contract for the department.

== Notable people ==
- Ken Raffensberger, Major League Baseball pitcher, buried at the township's Mount Rose Cemetery
- Scott Wagner, Pennsylvania State Senator
