= Pleasureville =

Pleasureville may refer to:

== Places and locations ==
- Pleasureville, Kentucky
- Pleasureville, Pennsylvania
  - Pleasureville Historic District

== Other ==
- Pleasureville, a one-time music alias of Hat Films

== See also ==
- Pleasure Valley (disambiguation)
