= Stonybrook, Pennsylvania =

Unincorporated place in Pennsylvania, US

Stonybrook
- Census-designated place
- Location in York County and the state of Pennsylvania.
- Coordinates: 39°58′48″N 76°37′54″W
- Country: United States
- State: Pennsylvania
- County: York
- Township: Springettsbury, Hellam Township, Windsor Township

Area
  - Total: 1.6 sq mi (4.2 km^{2})
  - Land: 1.6 sq mi (4.2 km^{2})

Population (2010)
  - Total: 2,384
  - Density: 1,500/sq mi (570/km^{2})
- Time zone: UTC-5 (Eastern (EST))
  - Summer (DST): UTC-4 (EDT)

Stonybrook is a census-designated place (CDP) in York County, Pennsylvania, United States. The population was 2,384 at the 2010 census.

== Geography ==
Stonybrook is located at 39°58′48″N 76°37′54″W (39.9799, -76.6317) in Springettsbury Township, east of York.

According to the United States Census Bureau, the CDP has a total area of 1.6 square miles (4.1 km^{2}), all land.

== Demographics ==
=== 2020 census ===
As of the 2020 census, Stonybrook had a population of 3,281. The median age was 43.4 years. 23.9% of residents were under the age of 18 and 19.3% of residents were 65 years of age or older. For every 100 females there were 95.2 males, and for every 100 females age 18 and over there were 91.2 males age 18 and over.

As of the 2020 U.S. Census most of the CDP is in Springettsbury Township while portions are in Hellam Township and Windsor Township.

100.0% of residents lived in urban areas, while 0.0% lived in rural areas.

There were 1,126 households in Stonybrook, of which 31.8% had children under the age of 18 living in them. Of all households, 67.1% were married-couple households, 11.2% were households with a male householder and no spouse or partner present, and 17.2% were households with a female householder and no spouse or partner present. About 19.1% of all households were made up of individuals and 11.5% had someone living alone who was 65 years of age or older.

There were 1,177 housing units, of which 4.3% were vacant. The homeowner vacancy rate was 1.5% and the rental vacancy rate was 12.8%.

Racial composition as of the 2020 census
Race	Number	Percent
White	2,780	84.7%
Black or African American	128	3.9%
American Indian and Alaska Native	2	0.1%
Asian	151	4.6%
Native Hawaiian and Other Pacific Islander	0	0.0%
Some other race	60	1.8%
Two or more races	160	4.9%
Hispanic or Latino (of any race)	144	4.4%

=== 2010 census ===
As of the 2010 census, the population was 2,384.

As of the 2010 U.S. Census the CDP was mostly in Springettsbury Township with pieces in Windsor Township, but it had no portions in Hellam Township.

=== 2000 census ===
The area was delineated as the Stonybrook-Wilshire CDP for the 2000 census.

== Education ==
As of the 2020 US Census, the CDP is in several school districts. Areas in Springettsbury Township are in the Central York School District. Areas in Hellam Township are in the Eastern York School District. Areas in Windsor Township are in the Red Lion Area School District.
