= East York (disambiguation) =

East York can refer to:

- East York, Pennsylvania, United States
- East York, Ontario, Canada
