= Yorklyn, Pennsylvania =

Unincorporated place in Pennsylvania, US

Yorklyn
- Census-designated place
- Location in York County and the state of Pennsylvania.
- Coordinates: 39°59′34″N 76°38′34″W
- Country: United States
- State: Pennsylvania
- County: York
- Township: Springettsbury

Area
  - Total: 0.46 sq mi (1.2 km^{2})
  - Land: 0.46 sq mi (1.2 km^{2})
- Elevation: 423 ft (129 m)

Population (2010)
  - Total: 1,912
  - Density: 4,100/sq mi (1,600/km^{2})
- Time zone: UTC-5 (Eastern (EST))
  - Summer (DST): UTC-4 (EDT)
- GNIS feature ID: 2584529

Yorklyn is a census-designated place (CDP) in York County, Pennsylvania, United States. The population was 1,912 at the 2010 census. The area was delineated as the Springetts Manor-Yorklyn CDP for the 2000 census.

== Geography ==
Yorklyn is located in Springettsbury Township, east of York.

According to the United States Census Bureau, the CDP has a total area of 0.45 square miles (1.2 km^{2}), all land.

== Education ==
The CDP is located in the Central York School District.
