= Fayfield, Pennsylvania =

Unincorporated community in Pennsylvania, U.S.

Coordinates: 39°58′02″N 76°40′58″W

Fayfield is a residential village, located within the census-designated place of East York in York County, Pennsylvania, United States.
