= East York Historic District =

Historic district in Pennsylvania, United States

- U.S. National Register of Historic Places
- U.S. Historic district
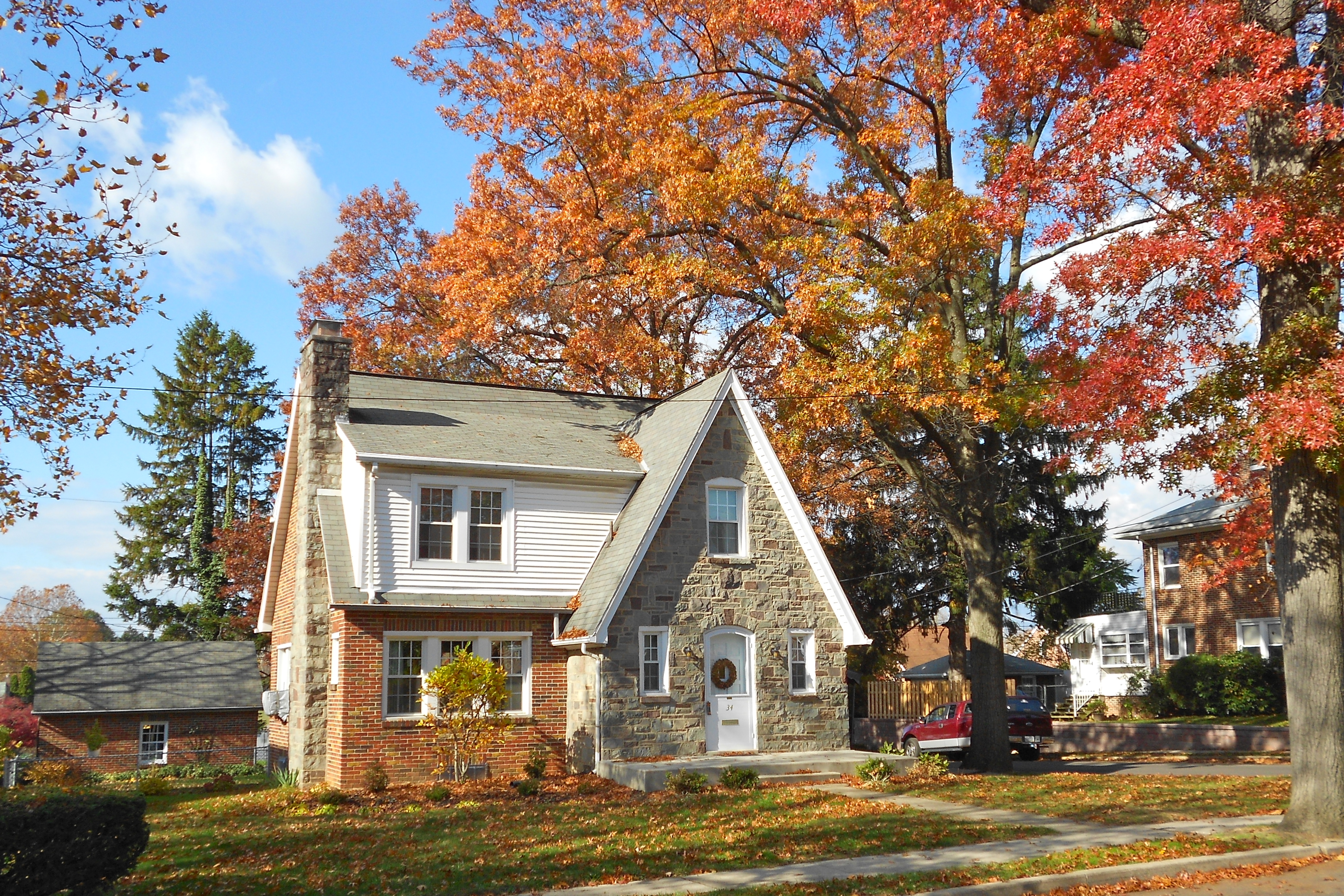
- House in the historic district

- Location within Pennsylvania Location within the United States
- Location: Bounded by Oxford St., Wallace St., Royal St., and Eastern Bvd., Springettsbury Township, Pennsylvania
- Coordinates: 39°58′27″N 76°41′17″W
- Area: 164 acres (66 ha)
- Architect: Lenker, Harry; Hamme, John B., et al.
- Architectural style: Colonial Revival, Tudor Revival, Prairie School, et al.
- NRHP reference No.: 99000326
- Added to NRHP: March 12, 1999

East York Historic District is a national historic district located at Springettsbury Township in York County, Pennsylvania. The district includes 262 contributing buildings in the residential community of East York. The community was laid out in 1903, but the houses primarily built in the 1930s and 1940s. The community includes notable examples of Colonial Revival, Tudor Revival, and Prairie School style dwellings. The district also includes the former school (1912), a three-story Art Deco-style apartment building (1936), and Advent Church.

It was listed on the National Register of Historic Places in 1999.

== Gallery ==
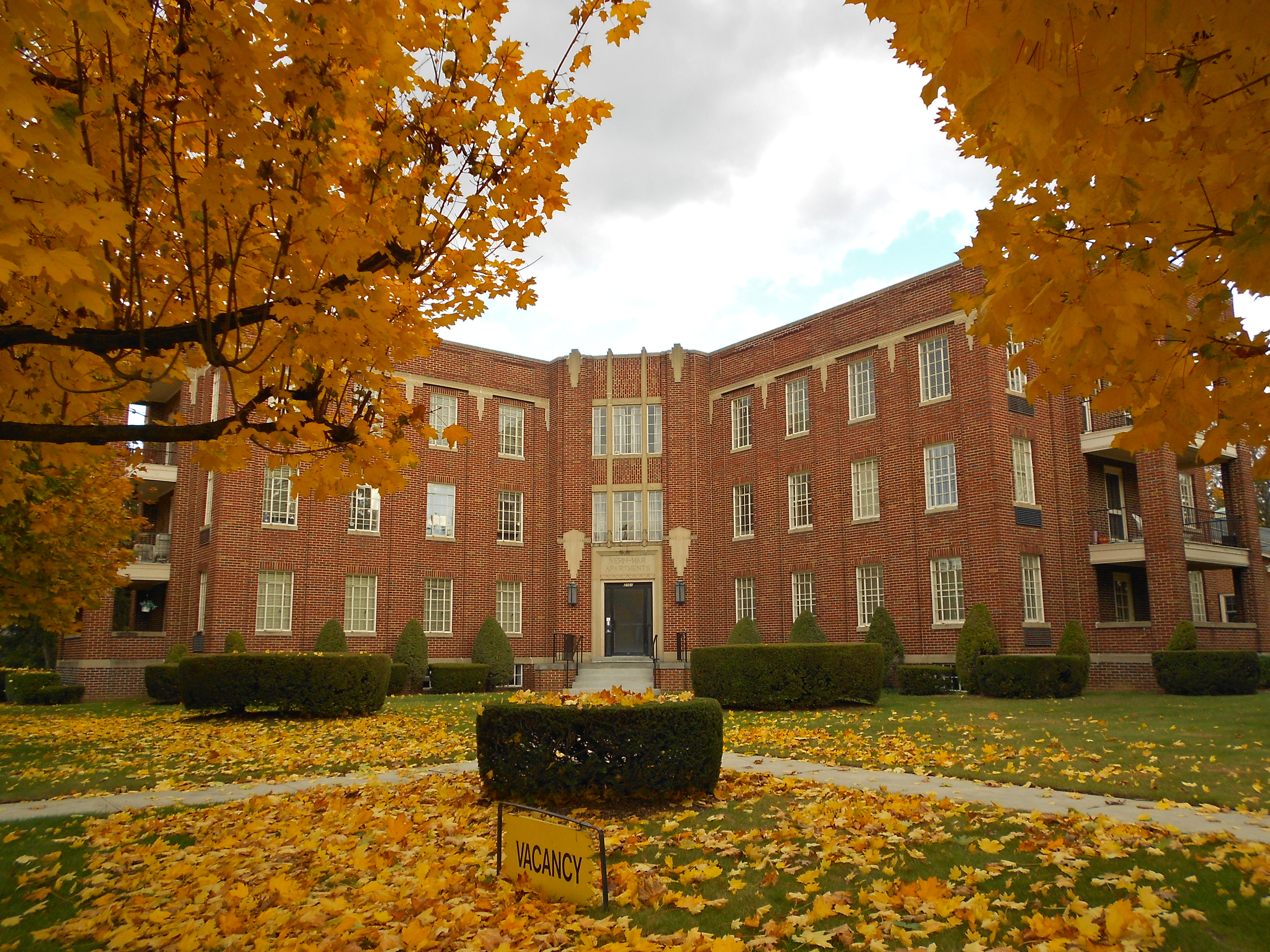
Apartment building on Market Street

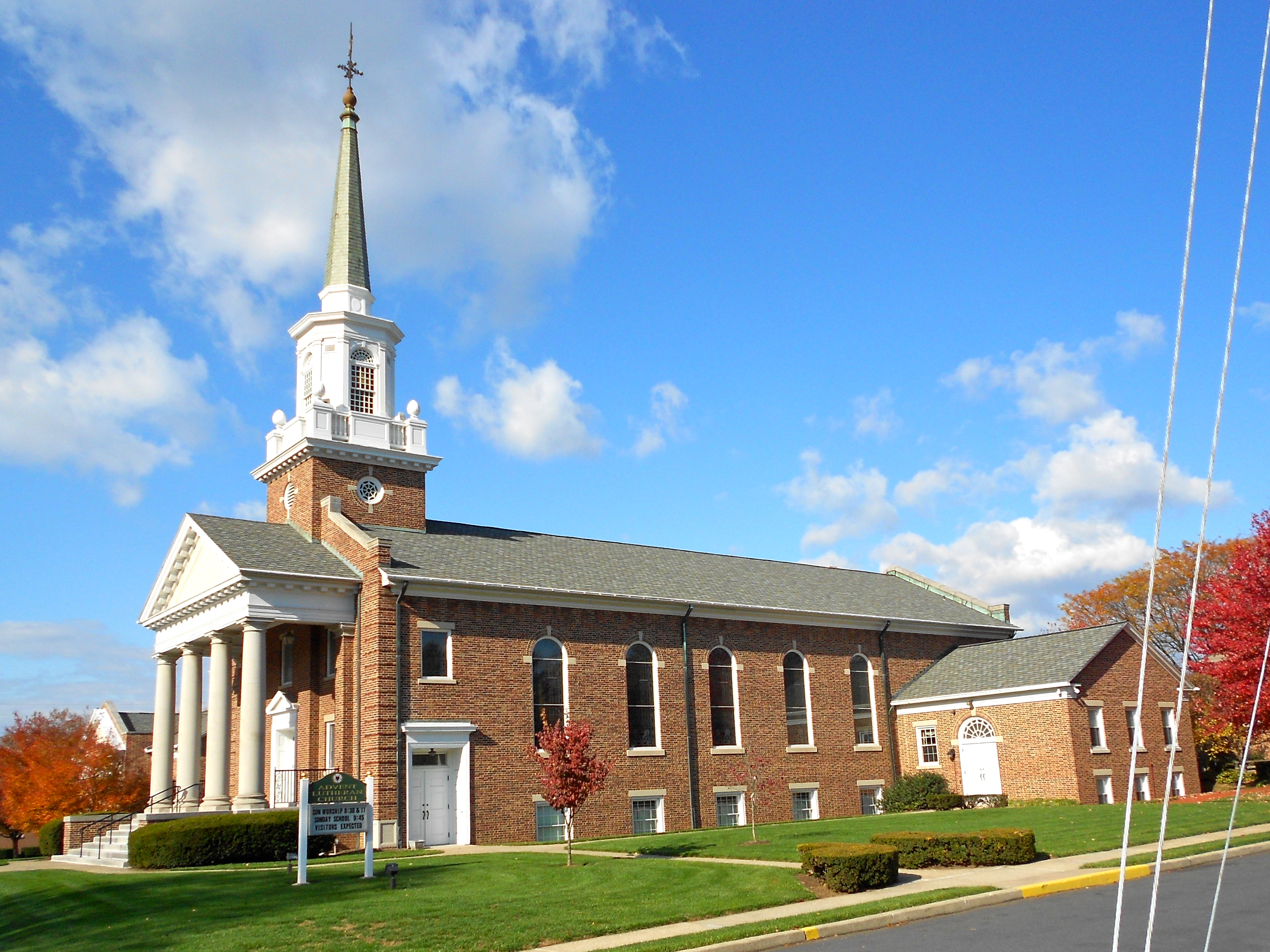
Advent Lutheran Church

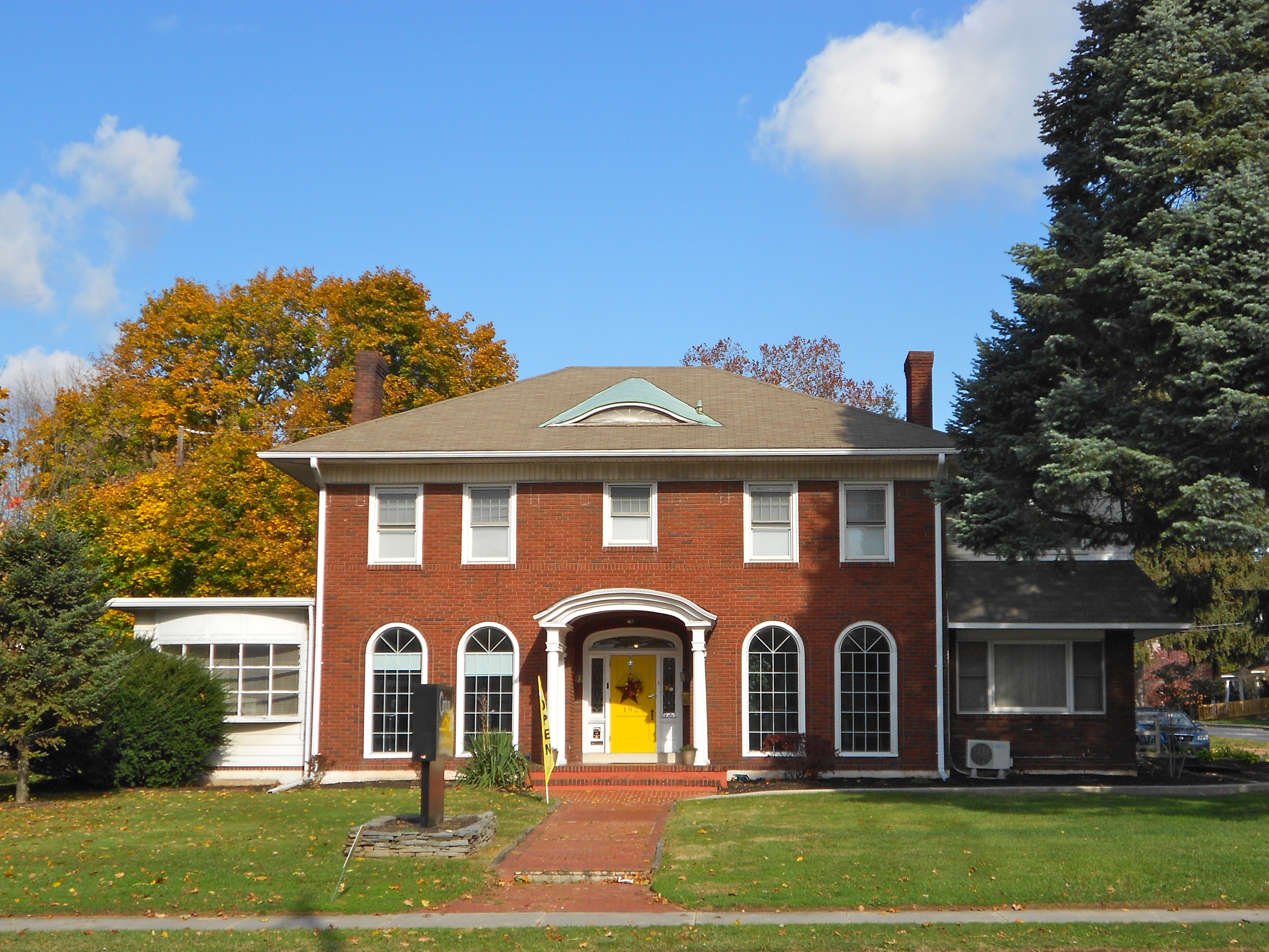
1925 Market

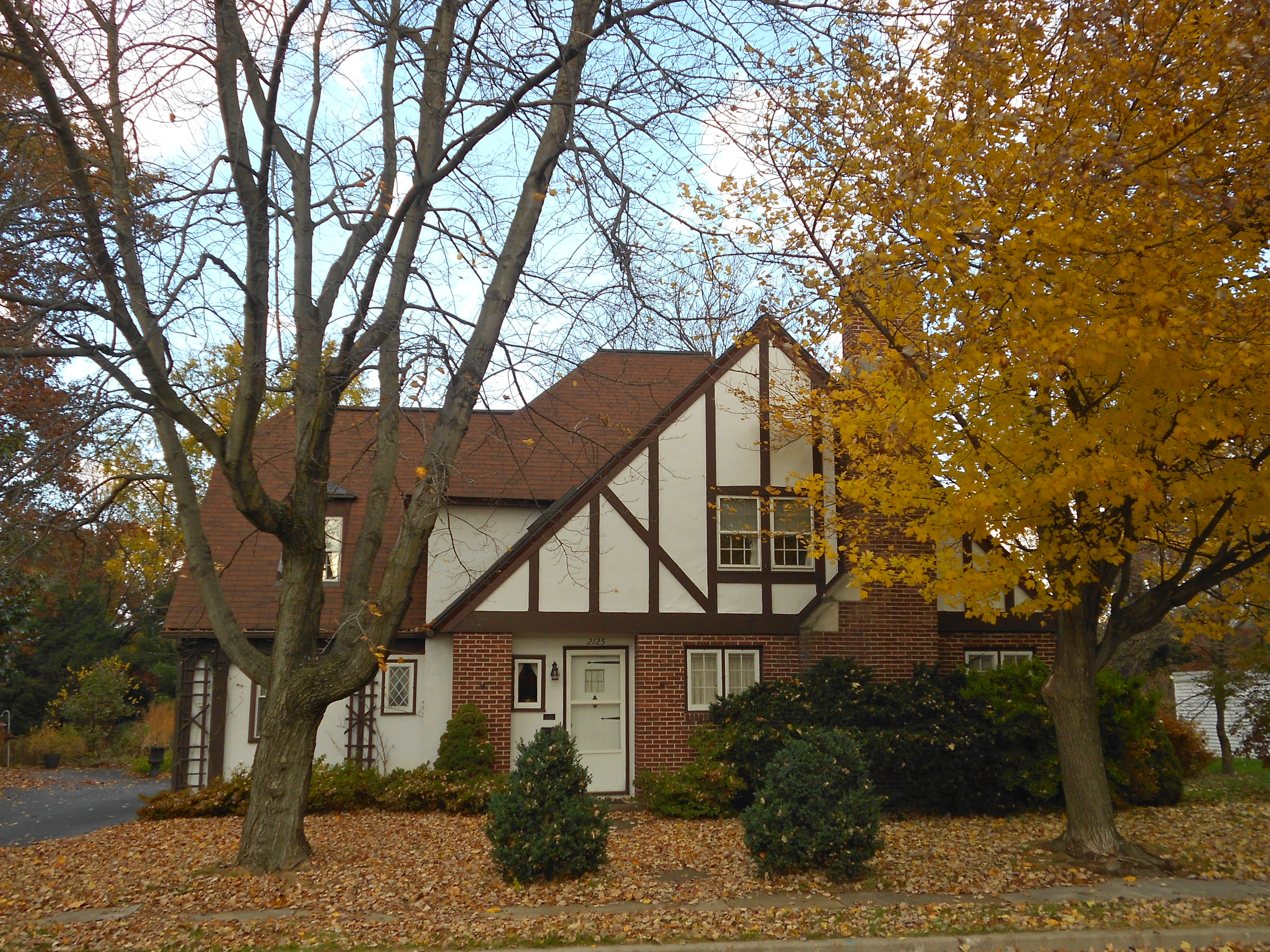
Tudor-style house

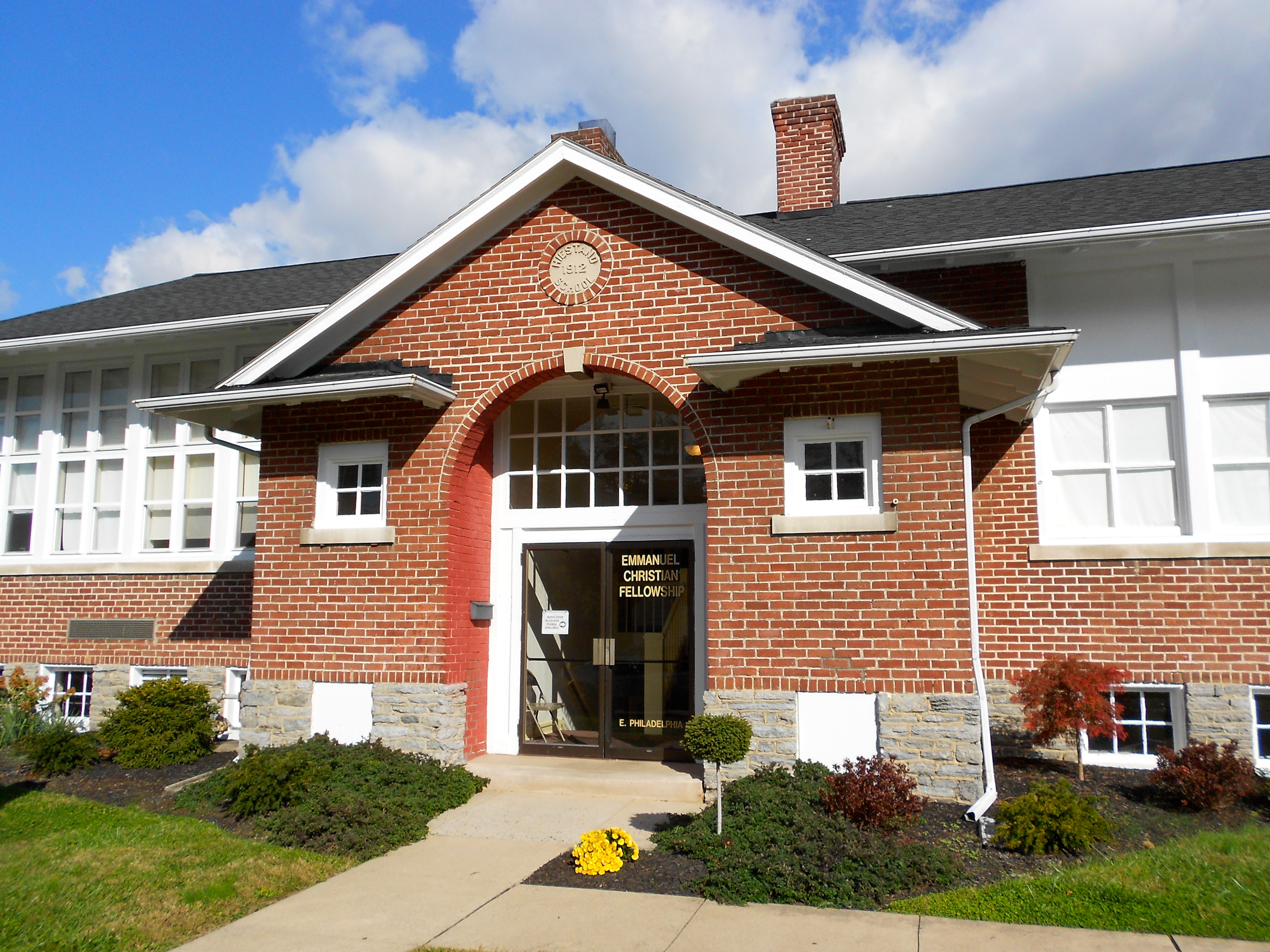
Hiestand School
