= Springetts Manor-Yorklyn, Pennsylvania =

Springetts Manor-Yorklyn
- CDP
- Location within the U.S. state of Pennsylvania Springetts Manor-Yorklyn (the United States)
- Coordinates: 39°59′24″N 76°38′50″W
- Country: United States
- State: Pennsylvania
- County: York

Area
  - Total: 1.2 sq mi (3.0 km^{2})
  - Land: 1.2 sq mi (3.0 km^{2})

Population (2000)
  - Total: 4,156
  - Density: 3,600/sq mi (1,400/km^{2})
- Time zone: UTC-5 (Eastern (EST))
  - Summer (DST): UTC-4 (EDT)

Springetts Manor-Yorklyn was a census-designated place (CDP) in York County, Pennsylvania, United States. The population was 4,156 at the 2000 census. The area was delineated as the Yorklyn CDP for the 2010 census.

== Geography ==
Springetts Manor-Yorklyn is located at 39°59′24″N 76°38′50″W (39.989963, -76.647091).

According to the United States Census Bureau, the CDP had a total area of 1.1 square miles (2.8 km^{2}), all of it land.

== Demographics ==
As of the census of 2000, there were 4,156 people, 1,129 households, and 637 families residing in the CDP. The population density was 3,621.2 inhabitants per square mile (1,398.2/km^{2}). There were 1,161 housing units at an average density of 1,011.6 per square mile (390.6/km^{2}). The racial makeup of the CDP was 79.48% White, 14.03% African American, 0.12% Native American, 3.39% Asian, 0.07% Pacific Islander, 1.85% from other races, and 1.06% from two or more races. Hispanic or Latino of any race were 7.92% of the population.

There were 1,129 households, out of which 25.1% had children under the age of 18 living with them, 45.4% were married couples living together, 8.1% had a female householder with no husband present, and 43.5% were non-families. 36.7% of all households were made up of individuals, and 20.9% had someone living alone who was 65 years of age or older. The average household size was 2.19 and the average family size was 2.86.

In the CDP, the population was spread out, with 13.0% under the age of 18, 14.1% from 18 to 24, 38.4% from 25 to 44, 16.6% from 45 to 64, and 17.9% who were 65 years of age or older. The median age was 37 years. For every 100 females, there were 145.9 males. For every 100 females age 18 and over, there were 154.1 males.

The median income for a household in the CDP was $38,563, and the median income for a family was $56,667. Males had a median income of $26,695 versus $22,823 for females. The per capita income for the CDP was $18,189. About 3.5% of families and 8.5% of the population were below the poverty line, including 8.5% of those under age 18 and 10.7% of those age 65 or over.
