= Springettsbury Township, Pennsylvania =

Township in Pennsylvania, US

Coordinates: 40°01′00″N 76°40′59″W

- Township
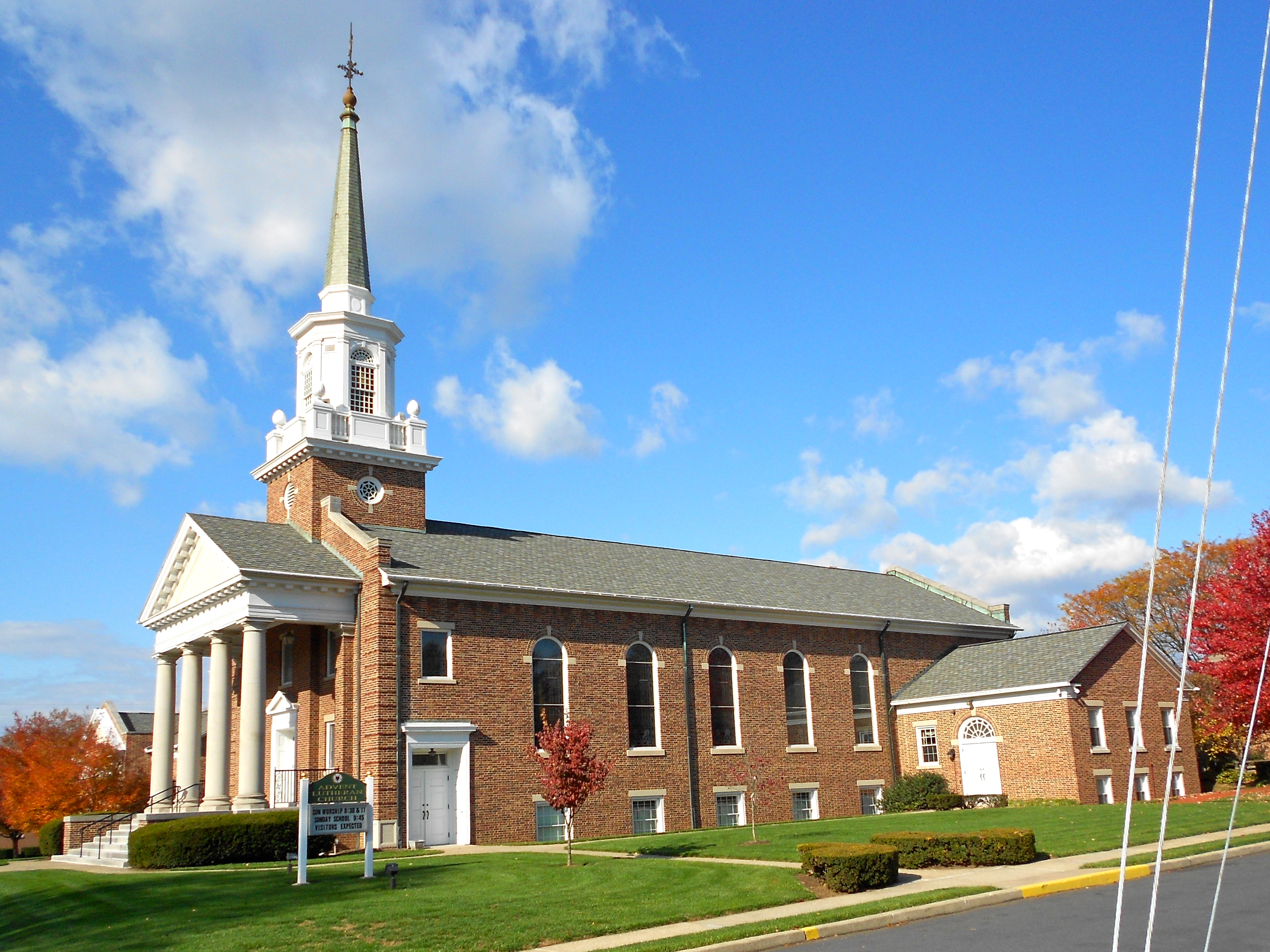
- Advent Lutheran Church in East York, Pennsylvania

- Flag Coat of arms

- Location in York County and the state of Pennsylvania.
- Country: United States
- State: Pennsylvania
- County: York
- Settled: 1737
- Incorporated: 1891

Government
  - Type: Supervisor-manager
  - Chairman: Mark Swomley
  - Vice Chairman: George Dvoryak
  - Other supervisors: Don Bishop; Robert Cox; Charles Wurster
  - Manager: Mark Hodgkinson

Area
  - Total: 16.38 sq mi (42.42 km^{2})
  - Land: 16.38 sq mi (42.42 km^{2})
  - Water: 0 sq mi (0.00 km^{2})

Population (2020)
  - Total: 27,032 ▲
  - Density: 1,640.4/sq mi (633.36/km^{2})
- Time zone: UTC-5 (Eastern (EST))
  - Summer (DST): UTC-4 (EDT)
- ZIP code: 17402
- Area code: 717
- State government
  - Senator (28): Kristin Phillips-Hill, since 2019; twp since 2023
  - House Rep (47): Joe D'Orsie, since 2023
  - House Rep (94): Wendy Fink, since 2023
- U.S. government
  - House Rep (10): Scott Perry, since 2013
- Website: springettsbury.com

Springettsbury Township is a township in York County, Pennsylvania, United States. The population was 27,032 at the 2010 census. The township takes its name from Springett Penn, grandson of Pennsylvania founder William Penn. Located east and northeast of the city of York, the township hosts the York Galleria shopping mall and a large Harley-Davidson manufacturing plant.

== History ==
Springettsbury Township was incorporated on April 20, 1891, formed from the northeast part of Spring Garden Township, which itself had separated from Hellam Township in 1822. Within Springettsbury, Diamond Silk Mill, East York Historic District, Pleasureville Historic District, and Strickler Family Farmhouse are listed on the National Register of Historic Places.

=== 18th century ===
While William Penn received a royal grant in 1681, rights to the land that became Springettsbury Township were purchased from local Native Americans in the early 1700s before it was settled. Original peoples of the area at this time included the Susquehannock/Conestoga. The "Treaty of 1736" acquired a clear title for Penn's heirs to the lands west of the Susquehanna River. Prior to this, Governor William Keith had held council with the native people on June 16, 1722. First identified as including 70,000 acres (28,000 ha), the land was marked as the "Manor of Springettsbury" and included dense forests of oak, chestnut, walnut, hickory, poplar, and ash trees. By 1739, Springettsbury Manor was encompassed by the founding of Hellam Township, and on August 19, 1749, York County was formed from what was the western part of Lancaster County. After a southern border dispute with Maryland was resolved, a re-survey in the 1760s found that the manor contained 64,250 acres (26,000 ha).

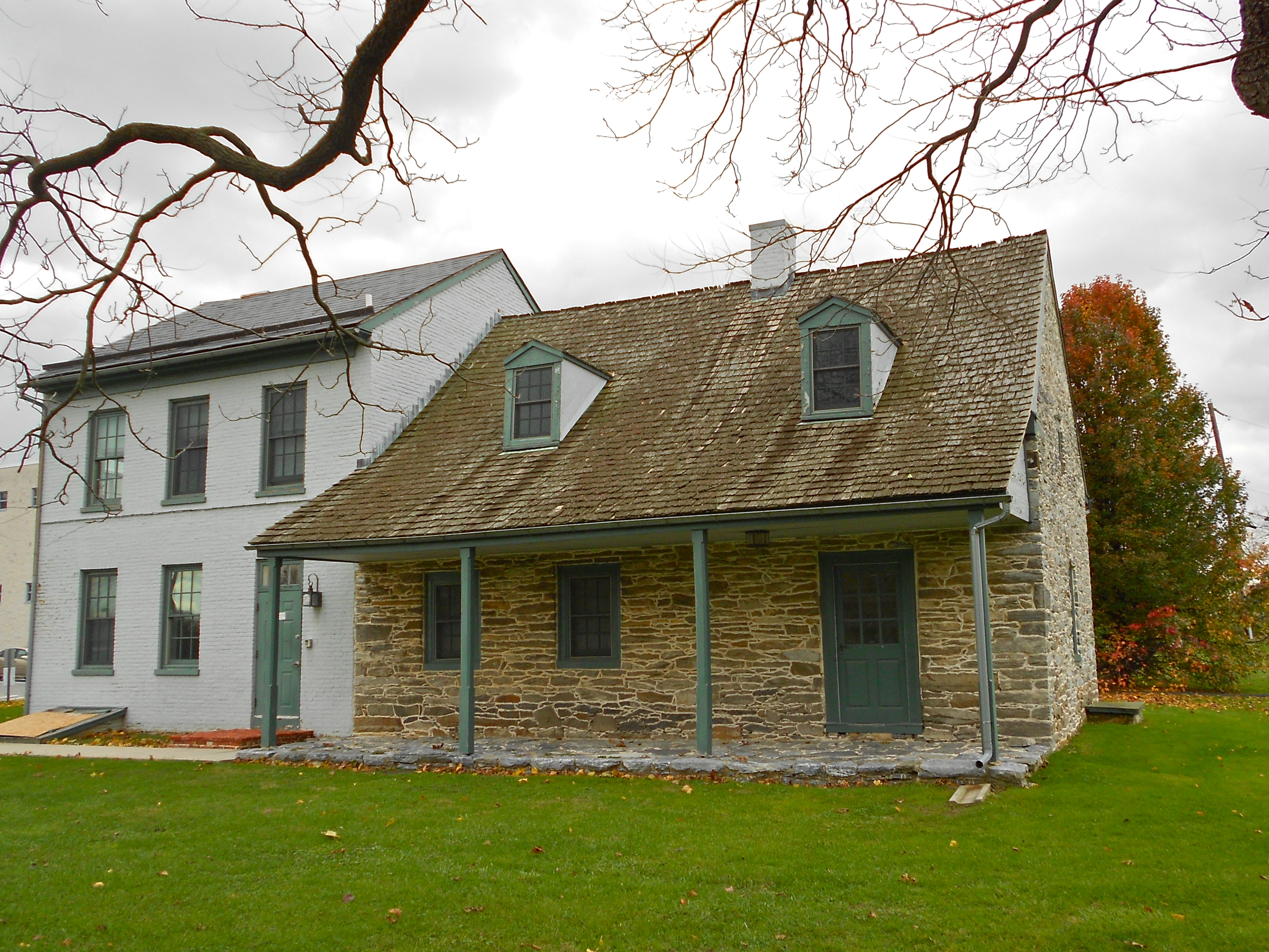
Oldest section of Strickler Farmhouse, built c. 1740

==== Camp Security ====
During the Revolutionary War, Camp Security operated in Springettsbury (then part of Hellam) Township from 1781 to the war's end in 1783, and held prisoners from the Battles of Saratoga in New York and later those from the Battle of Yorktown in Virginia. Located just east of the current Penn Oaks development, the camp housed 1,500 prisoners, Continental Army guards, and their families. The first prisoners arrived from an overcrowded stockade in Charlottesville, Virginia, years after their 1777 capture, and were obliged to build their own stockade and huts, as well as guard shacks for their captors. The poor accommodations and shortages of food, clothing, and medicine contributed to the spread of disease such that hundreds died and were buried in mostly unmarked graves nearby. Yorktown prisoners arrived in 1782 and Camp Indulgence was built nearby, outside the stockade, with similar huts but with less security and easier parole for about 600 residents (non-commissioned officers and some women and children). An archeological dig found Camp Security's stockade post holes in October 2022, and work to uncover more remains of the site continued in 2023.

=== 19th century ===
Spring Garden Township, which then included the Springettsbury land, was formed out of the southwestern part of Hellam Township in 1822.

Springettsbury is not known to have had any Civil War battles, though a Confederate brigade from Georgia, commanded by General John B. Gordon, gathered in the township two miles east of York on June 28, 1863, before marching eastward to Wrightsville. A covered wooden bridge was burned by the Union army to prevent the Georgia brigade from crossing the Susquehanna River. Gordon arranged a bucket brigade to save the town from the spreading fire, and departed the next morning.

Citizens in the rapidly growing eastern portion of Spring Garden Township, led by John S. Hiestand, petitioned for a division of the township. After a Spring 1891 election, the petition was presented to the county courts and studied by three commissioners who decided "in favor" of the change. Springettsbury Township was officially sanctioned on April 20, 1891. At the turn of the century, a covered bridge on Diehl Mill Road (now North Sherman Street) crossed Mill Creek between these two townships. By the 1900 census, the new township had a population of 1,783.

=== 20th century ===
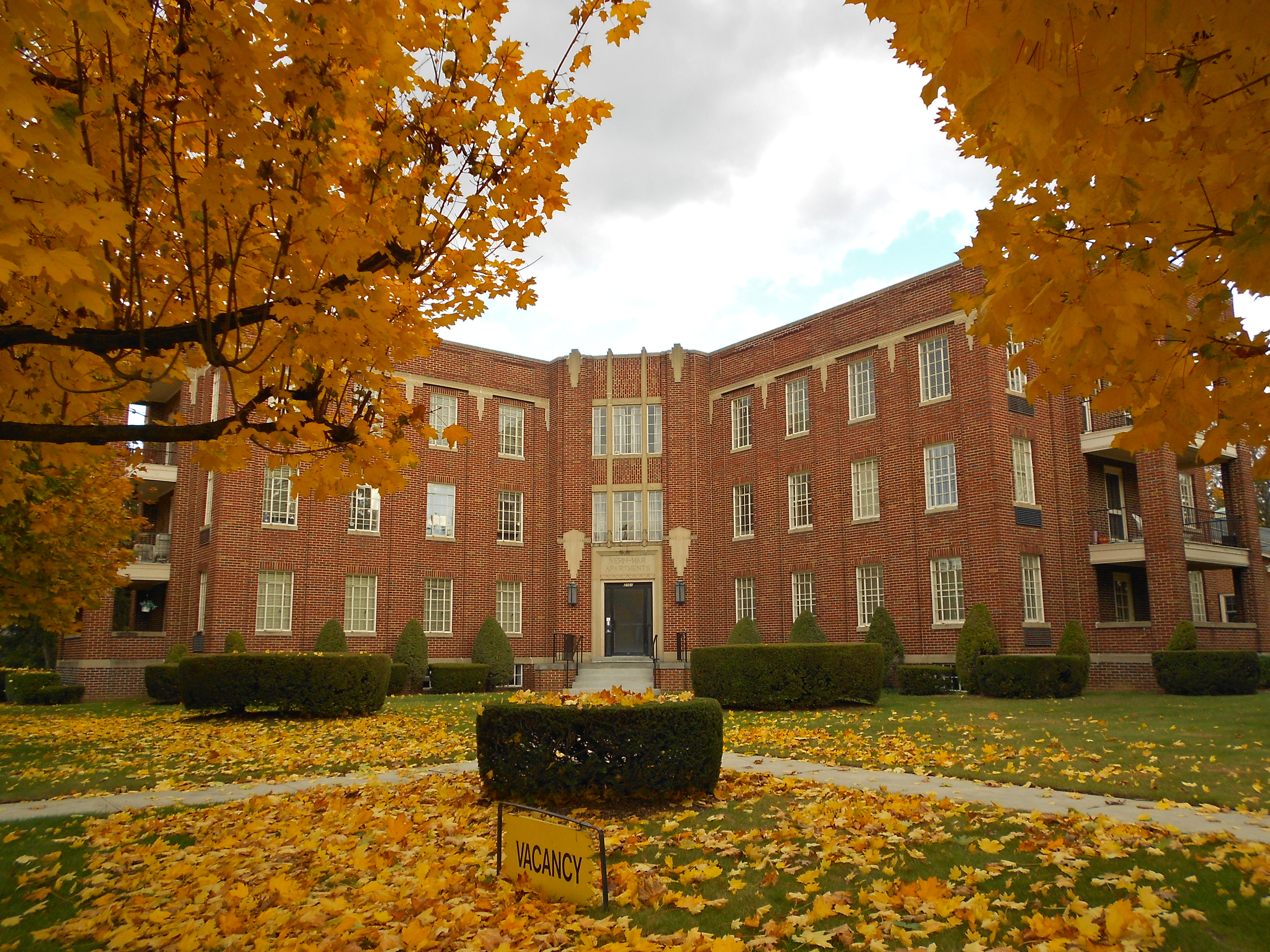
An apartment building along Market Street in East York

East York was first developed in Springettsbury Township in 1903, and on May 21, 1904, the York/Wrightsville Electric Railroad (trolley) began with hourly service via tracks along East Market Street (later designated part of the Lincoln Highway and US 30; now Route 462). Service to Wrightsville ended in 1932 (or 1933) while the frequency increased to every 20 minutes between York and a station at Kershaw Street. East York's fastest growth – the building of 167 houses – was in the 1930s. Bus service replaced the trolley in the 1940s, and the tracks were removed in the early 1950s when a fourth lane was added to East Market Street.

Other historic subdivisions in the township, and their years of development, include Fayfield (c. 1937 – c. 1986), Haines Acres (800 acres, 1954–1973), and Yorkshire. The York Suburban School District includes students from all of these neighborhoods and East York.

Springettsbury Township hosted a 101-acre (41 ha), 1.5-million-square-foot (140×10^{3} m^{2}) Caterpillar manufacturing plant from 1953 until its closure in the 1990s, when the company continued operating a comparatively smaller parts distribution center.

The headquarters and distribution center of the former McCrory Stores chain was in Springettsbury Township from 1963. Founded in 1882, the stores filed for bankruptcy in 1992 and 2001, and the company ceased operation in early 2002.

=== 21st century ===
The vacant former Caterpillar facility was acquired by a joint venture in 2002 for $9 million and received $50 million in redevelopment investments as the "York Business Center" before being sold at a profit in 2008. Primary tenants at that time included RR Donnelley and Bon-Ton Stores.

In late 2016, Post Consumer Brands filed plans to move into a newly built 755,000-square-foot (70,100 m^{2}) logistics center within the Harley-Davidson campus off Eden Road in the township. Expected to generate 70 jobs, Post was to occupy about 80 percent of the building, likely by January 2017, with the remainder available for lease by Post or other tenants. To be used for dry cereal storage, the warehouse has over 60 docks for shipping and receiving. Its builder declared the center's construction complete on January 23, 2017.

Bon-Ton Stores employed 332 workers at its Springettsbury Township headquarters as of April 2018 before the department store chain closed in August 2018.

Hollywood Casino York opened in Springettsbury Township in August 2021. The 80,000-square-foot (7,400 m^{2}) casino has over 500 video poker and slot machines, a full-service restaurant, and Pennsylvania's first retail Barstool Sportsbook location.

== Geography ==
According to the United States Census Bureau, the township has a total area of 16.7 square miles (43.4 km^{2}), all land. Its western and northwestern boundaries (with Manchester and East Manchester Townships) are adjacent to Codorus Creek and its southwestern boundary (with Spring Garden Township) is along Mill Creek. Springettsbury Township's southeastern border is with York and Windsor Townships and its northeastward-facing border is with Hellam Township.

The township includes the census-designated places of Pleasureville, East York, Yorklyn, and Stonybrook.

== Major roads ==
- Interstate 83
- U.S. Route 30
- PA Route 24 (Mount Zion Road / Edgewood Road)
- PA Route 124 (Mount Rose Avenue)
- PA Route 462 (East Market Street)

== Demographics ==
Historical population
Census	Pop.	Note	%±
1900	1,783		—
1910	1,707		−4.3%
1920	1,801		5.5%
1930	2,597		44.2%
1940	3,790		45.9%
1950	5,537		46.1%
1960	14,232		157.0%
1970	19,399		36.3%
1980	19,687		1.5%
1990	21,564		9.5%
2000	23,883		10.8%
2010	26,668		11.7%
2020	27,058		1.5%
2023 (est.)	27,453		1.5%
United States Census Bureau

=== 2020 ===
As of the census of 2020, there were 27,058 people residing in the township. The population density was 1,652.9 inhabitants per square mile (638.2/km^{2}). The racial makeup of the township was 77.7% white, 8.3% black or African American, 4.1% Asian, 1.3% Native American, and 8.6% from other races. 9.0% of the population were Hispanic or Latino of any race.

=== 2010 ===
As of the census of 2010, there were 26,668 people, 9,832 households and 6,588 families residing in the township. The population density was 1,596.5 inhabitants per square mile (616.4/km^{2}). There were 10,265 housing units at an average density of 614.7 per square mile (237.3/km^{2}). The racial makeup of the township was 82.2% White, 7.0% African American, 0.2% Native American, 3.0% Asian, 0.0% Pacific Islander, 5.3% from other races, and 1.8% from two or more races. Hispanic or Latino of any race were 7.1% of the population.

There were 9,832 households, of which 18.5% had children under the age of 18 living with them, 53.4% were married couples living together, 9.6% had a female householder with no husband present, and 33.0% were non-families. 27.1% of all households were made up of individuals, and 12.6% had someone living alone who was 65 years of age or older. The average household size was 2.37 and the average family size was 2.87.

In the township, the population was spread out, with 18.6% under the age of 18, 8.8% from 18 to 24, 26.7% from 25 to 44, 27.7% from 45 to 64, and 18.1% who were 65 years of age or older. The median age was 42.1 years. For every 100 males there were 93.1 females. For every 100 males age 18 and over, there were 93.3 females.

The median income for a household in the township was $62,224 and the median income for a family was $72,154. Males had a median income of $51,186 versus $37,328 for females. The per capita income for the township was $29,372. About 3.4% of families and 5.9% of the population were below the poverty line, including 5.3% of those under age 18 and 5.1% of those age 65 or over.

== Government ==
Springettsbury Township is governed by a board of five supervisors who are elected at-large by voters for six-year terms. Supervisor terms are staggered and expire at the end of odd-numbered years. A Tax Collector and three Township Auditors are also elected by township voters at-large to six-year terms. A chairman and vice chairman are appointed among the Board of Supervisors.

Springettsbury Township is a municipal corporation organized under the Pennsylvania Second Class Township Code. The township has functioned under a Supervisor – Manager form of government since 1963. A Township Manager, who acts as the Chief Administrative Officer, is appointed by the Board of Supervisors. Various boards and commissions are also formed to address specific issues such as subdivision planning, zoning, recreation, historical preservation, and recycling. The Board of Supervisors appoints members to these boards and commissions.

Public meetings are regularly held at 7:00 p.m. on the second and fourth Thursdays of each month in the municipal complex at 1501 Mount Zion Road; exceptions are in June, July, and August (fourth Thursday only); November (third Wednesday only); and December (second Thursday only).

=== Community services ===
Springettsbury Township has been served historically by two volunteer fire companies: Commonwealth Fire Co. and Springetts Fire Co., both dating from the mid-1920s; in 2008 they joined forces with Spring Garden Township as part of a York Area United Fire and Rescue company. Emergency Medical Services are available via subscription program from White Rose Ambulance, since January 1, 2018. The township's government maintains an active parks and recreation program, as well as a police force, both since 1958.

==== Commonwealth Fire Company ====
In January 1924, after a fire in the village of Pleasureville was put out via bucket brigade, a group of citizens met to discuss organization of a fire company. A committee was established and met on March 18, 1924, electing officers. Within two months, they had their first truck, and they dedicated their first firehouse on October 18, 1924. A second truck was added in 1942, a Ladies Auxiliary in 1949, and dining/social halls (each 36 by 50 feet (11 by 15 m)) in 1952. Later additions included a 500-US-gallon (1,900 L; 420 imp gal) pumper and two more firehouse bays in 1957; 24-hour/day, paid drivers in 1959; a 1,000-US-gallon (3,800 L; 830 imp gal) pumper in 1965; and a rescue truck by 1969. In late 1969, plans began for a new firehouse, and 8.5 acres (3.4 ha) of land along Sherman Street was purchased in March 1970. Building construction began in the second quarter of 1972, and the apparatus moved to the new building in May 1973.

==== Springetts Fire Company ====
When fire destroyed a large residence in the Yorkshire neighborhood on Christmas Eve 1925, organization of a local fire company, which had been under consideration by a few individuals, became a concern of the majority. A meeting in January 1926 resulted in organization of the Springetts Fire Company and election of officers. The first fire apparatus had chemical tanks, was built on a donated Buick chassis, included 150 feet (46 m) of 1-inch (25 mm) hose, and was stored in an individual's garage. Mahlon Haines, the main developer of the neighborhood, donated a plot of land that was used as part payment for a larger plot on the south side of Market Street. The $10,000 building on this property was completed in July 1931, and a Lady's Auxiliary was later formed. The original fire apparatus was replaced with a new fire truck in 1938 and 600 feet (180 m) of 2.5-inch (64 mm) hose. After a public meeting and sensing citizen support, the fire company bought a pumper in 1947 and a service truck was added in 1952.

A building committee was formed in January 1954 to begin planning for a new location. The ladies of the Commonwealth Fire Company helped with reorganization of a Ladies Auxiliary in October 1954. A building fund began in August 1955 and an ambulance was donated, spurring the formation of an ambulance club in March 1956 and ambulance service by July of that year; the ambulance club became a separate organization in November 1961. The township supervisors informed the fire company in November 1956 that they had acquired a piece of land, formerly owned by the Pennsylvania Railroad, as a new building location. After bids were taken in January 1958, contracts for nearly $75,000 were awarded for construction. One third of this amount was raised by the community and the rest was applied to a mortgage. The company sold its old firehouse at 2914 East Market Street and moved to its new location at 3013 East Market Street (farther east, on the north side) in November 1958.

The company joined the Fireman's Association of York County in February 1961, and took delivery of new apparatus in March 1963. Construction of an expansion to the firehouse began in March 1967 and was complete in December of that year. The company took delivery of a new snorkel truck in 1970 and a pumper in June 1972. A second ambulance was added in 1972, and another building addition occurred in 1974. A new pumper to replace the 1962 model was received in February 1979. The township had begun paying for hired drivers in 1959, and they became township employees rather than fire company employees in 1975, eventually taking on more responsibilities and being classified as paid firefighters (working for both fire companies). Three full-time EMT personnel were hired in December 1978, and this number expanded to six by 1987.

==== York Area United Fire and Rescue ====
In June 2004, the Springettsbury Township supervisors and the Spring Garden Township commissioners formed an ad hoc committee to consider a combined fire service. A Joint Fire Service (JFS) committee first met in May 2005 to develop a framework. In 2006, a consulting firm was hired to provide a comprehensive plan. The plan, which received significant development assistance from the Pennsylvania Department of Community and Economic Development, was approved by the JFS committee in 2007. Both townships approved a charter amendment for creation of a fire commission to govern the new department, composed of seven commissioners drawn from the two townships. The first meeting of the York Area United Fire and Rescue Commission was held in September 2007, and a formal consolidation took place on May 5, 2008, establishing York County Company 89. In 2009, the department began selling and removing from service its excessive apparatus and replacing it with new, such as three pumpers with two 2010 models. In April 2010, the York Area United Fire and Rescue Commission and the International Association of Fire Fighters, Local 2377, signed the first joint contract for the department.

On July 10, 2013, ground was broken for the third location of a fire and EMS station in the eastern part of the township, to replace one built in 1958. At a cost of $3.8 million, the new 4-bay 15,500-square-foot (1,440 m^{2}) station opened in 2014 at 50 Commons Drive, an equally new road between Eastern Boulevard and East Market Street. The former property at 3013 Market Street was sold to a developer and its building torn down in 2015 for construction of a 15,680-square-foot (1,457 m^{2}) "Firehouse Shoppes" shopping center.

On January 1, 2018, Manchester Township's fire services department officially merged with YAUFR after a gradual integration of services that began in 2010.

In February 2019, YAUFR had three new Spartan replacement fire engines whose purchase began in 2017. The vehicles have touchscreen controls, backup cameras, and LED lighting, and their design was customized by the department. The new equipment joins two other front-line fire engines, two ladder trucks, a heavy rescue vehicle, and two reserve engines.

==== Parks and recreation ====
The township Board of Supervisors resolved on February 6, 1958, to create a Park and Recreation Board. Its first Supervisor of Recreation was R. Bruce Bainbridge, who was still serving as of the township's 100th anniversary in 1991. The original parks in 1958 were at Pleasureville, Yorkshire, East York, and Hiestand; there were 13 park locations by 1983 and 16 in 1991. The township now operates and maintains 11 parks covering a total of 150 acres (61 ha). The current park and recreation board has seven members with staggered four-year terms; they meet monthly except August and December. Most of the township parks include picnic shelters, grills, basketball courts, and playground areas.

==== Police department ====
The Springettsbury Township Police Department was established on February 9, 1958, with one police chief, one patrolman, and one police car. By 1991, the department had grown to 25 full-time officers, including 17 patrolmen. The department was accredited by the Pennsylvania Chiefs of Police Association in July 2006. In late 2015, the department joined others across the U.S. and opened "safe zones" at its station where online sales may be completed, such as with the exchange of items or money.

=== State and U.S. representation ===
Following 2021 redistricting, Springettsbury Township is represented by a state senator from District 28. The township's local districts 02, 03, and 07 are within state house District 47; township districts 01, 04, 05, 06, and 08 are part of state house District 94. In January 2019, Springettsbury joined northwestern York County, Dauphin County and eastern Cumberland County, which are served by a U.S. House representative elected to a redrawn 10th congressional district. Its southern and western boundaries were modified again for January 2023.

== Employers ==
According to Pennsylvania's SouthCentral Workforce Investment Board, Springettsbury Township's largest four employers as of 2008 were:

#	Employer	Local Employees	Industry	Local Address
1	Harley-Davidson Inc	2,150	Motorcycle manufacturing	1425 Eden Road
2	Graham Packaging Co	865	Plastic container manufacturing	2401 Pleasant Valley Road
3	Bon Ton Stores Inc	600	Department store chain	2801 E. Market Street
4	YTI Career Institute	367	Higher education	1405 Williams Road

A 2010 URS Corporation "Springettsbury Town Center Plan" commissioned by the township identifies the manufacturing sector as the largest employer, with township residents tending to be in management rather than production. Retail jobs employed the second most residents, with their overall payroll less than a third of the manufacturing total.

== Education ==
Springettsbury Township is served by the Central York and York Suburban School Districts. Public schools within the township borders include the following:

- Central York High School
- Central York Middle School (formerly North Hills Junior High)
- East York Elementary School
- North Hills Elementary School (opened 1957)
- Stony Brook Elementary School
- Yorkshire Elementary School
- York Suburban Middle School

Private schools within the township include YTI Career Institute's York campus and a Goddard School. Until its closure in 2017, Springettsbury hosted The Art Institute of York – Pennsylvania.

=== Former schools ===
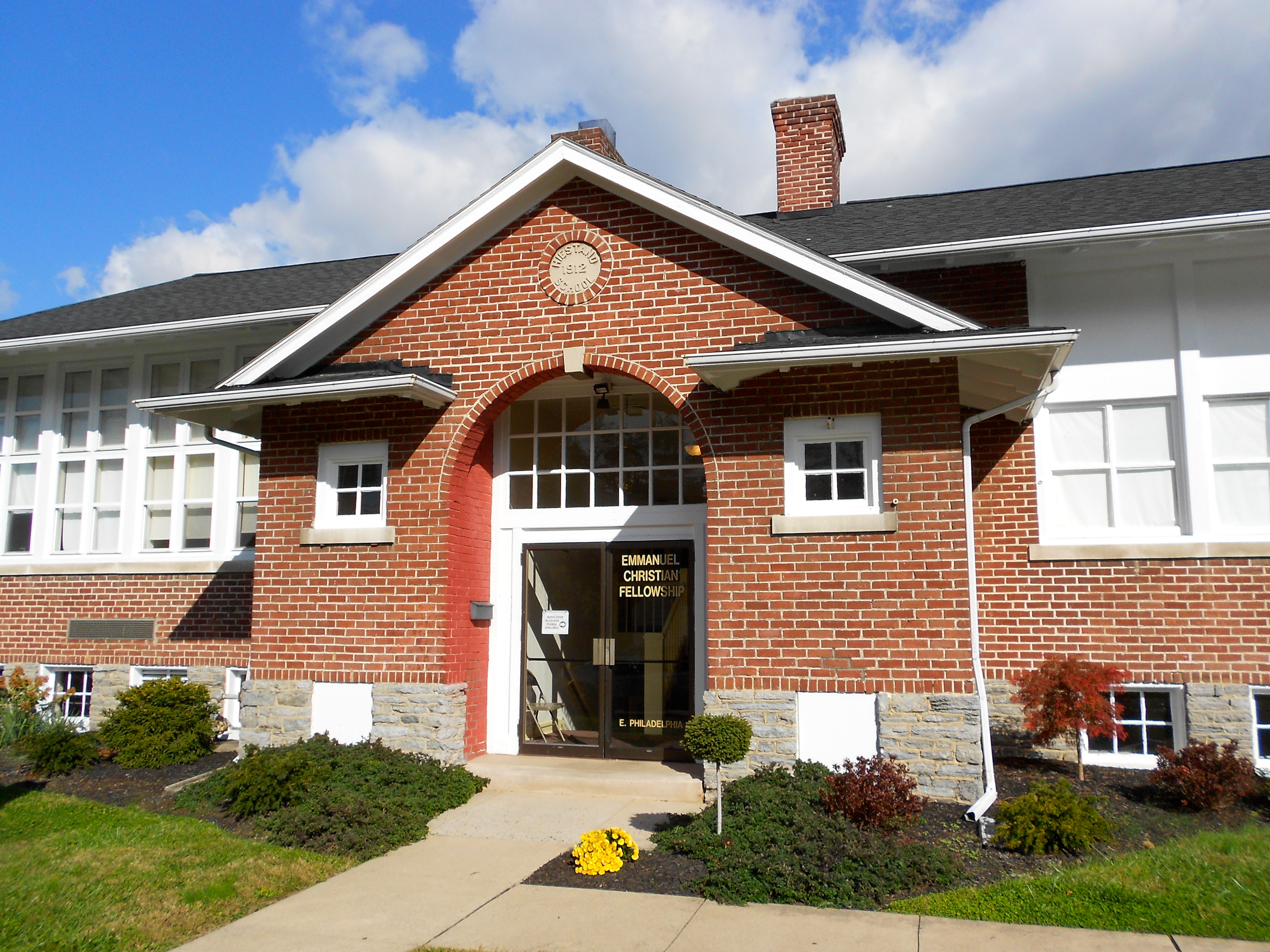
Hiestand School

Public education in the township began with small schoolhouses, some with only one room. Seven such schools were: Miller's, Stony Brook, Witmer's, Glades, Mount Zion, Pleasureville, and Lefever's; this last of which was torn down in 1912 and the Hiestand School built near Haines Road and Eastern Boulevard. Originally a two-room school, Hiestand was doubled to four rooms in 1927 and had six rooms by 1937. In 1946, the township's Independent School District had a budget of $45,000 with five one-room schools; the Pleasureville school had four rooms. The Hiestand School and others from that district merged with the York Suburban School District when it was formed in 1955. The other schools in the township had become part of the Central Joint School District (now Central York) in 1952. Springettsbury Township School's opening in September 1952 resulted in closure of all the one-room schools; one of them, Witmer's School, had never received electricity service. Springettsbury Township School stopped enrolling new students in 1977, and the building was subsequently used by the York Technical School before being sold to the township for expansion of an adjacent park. The Hiestand School was closed in June 1978 for financial reasons and declining enrollment, and has been used by various community organizations. Pleasureville Elementary School closed in 1982.
