= Strickler Family Farmhouse =

Historic house in Pennsylvania, United States

- U.S. National Register of Historic Places
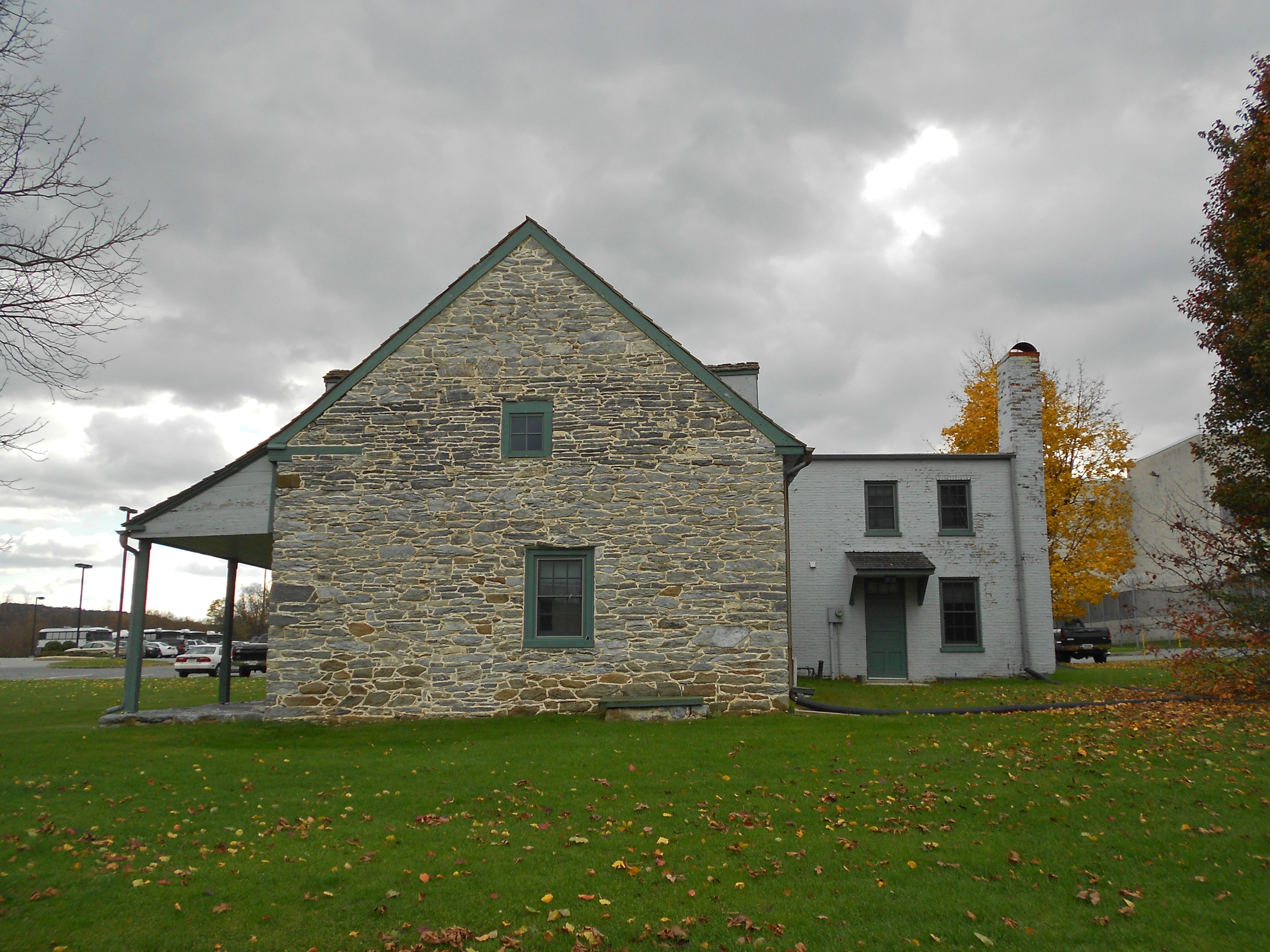

- Location within Pennsylvania Location within the United States
- Location: 1205 Williams Rd., Springettsbury Township, Pennsylvania
- Coordinates: 39°59′16″N 76°39′33″W
- Area: less than one acre
- Built: c. 1740, c. 1835, c. 1865
- Architectural style: Colonial, Georgian, Post-medieval German
- NRHP reference No.: 91000093
- Added to NRHP: February 21, 1991

The Strickler Family Farmhouse, also known as the County Farm, is an historic home that is located in Springettsbury Township, York County, Pennsylvania, United States.

The home was added to the National Register of Historic Places in 1991.

== Description ==
The farmhouse consists of three sections: a 1 1/2-story, two-bay by one-bay, Germanic-influenced, limestone main house, a 2 1/2-story, brick Georgian-style wing that was built circa 1835, and a two-story brick ell that was built circa 1865.

Also located on the property is the Strickler family cemetery, with burials that date back to the 1700s.

== History ==
Ulrich and Mary Strickler immigrated to Pennsylvania in 1737 and purchased two hundred acres of farmland west of the Susquehanna River from the Penn family. Samuel Strickler was born in the stone house in 1875.

The family sold the farm during the early twentieth century; it was the subsequently sold in 1943 to York County and used for a prison site. For a few years, the federal immigration service used the house for office space, before it went unused. Three generations of family members visited the house in July 2020 after learning of its ancestral link.

== NRHP registration, demolition plans, and saving ==
The home was added to the National Register of Historic Places in 1991.

As of October 2019, the farmhouse faced demolition after York County cancelled its previously-announced plans to move its coroner's office there. Although nearly half a million dollars of repairs, including mold mitigation, were required for continued use of the structure, only $11,000 in donations were obtained for the repairs.

In autumn 2019, York County hired a consulting firm to document the history of the farmhouse. In October 2021, it was announced that the property had been saved from demolition, with county commissioners approving a ninety-nine-year, rent-free lease to Historic York, which will preserve and maintain the building.

== Gallery ==
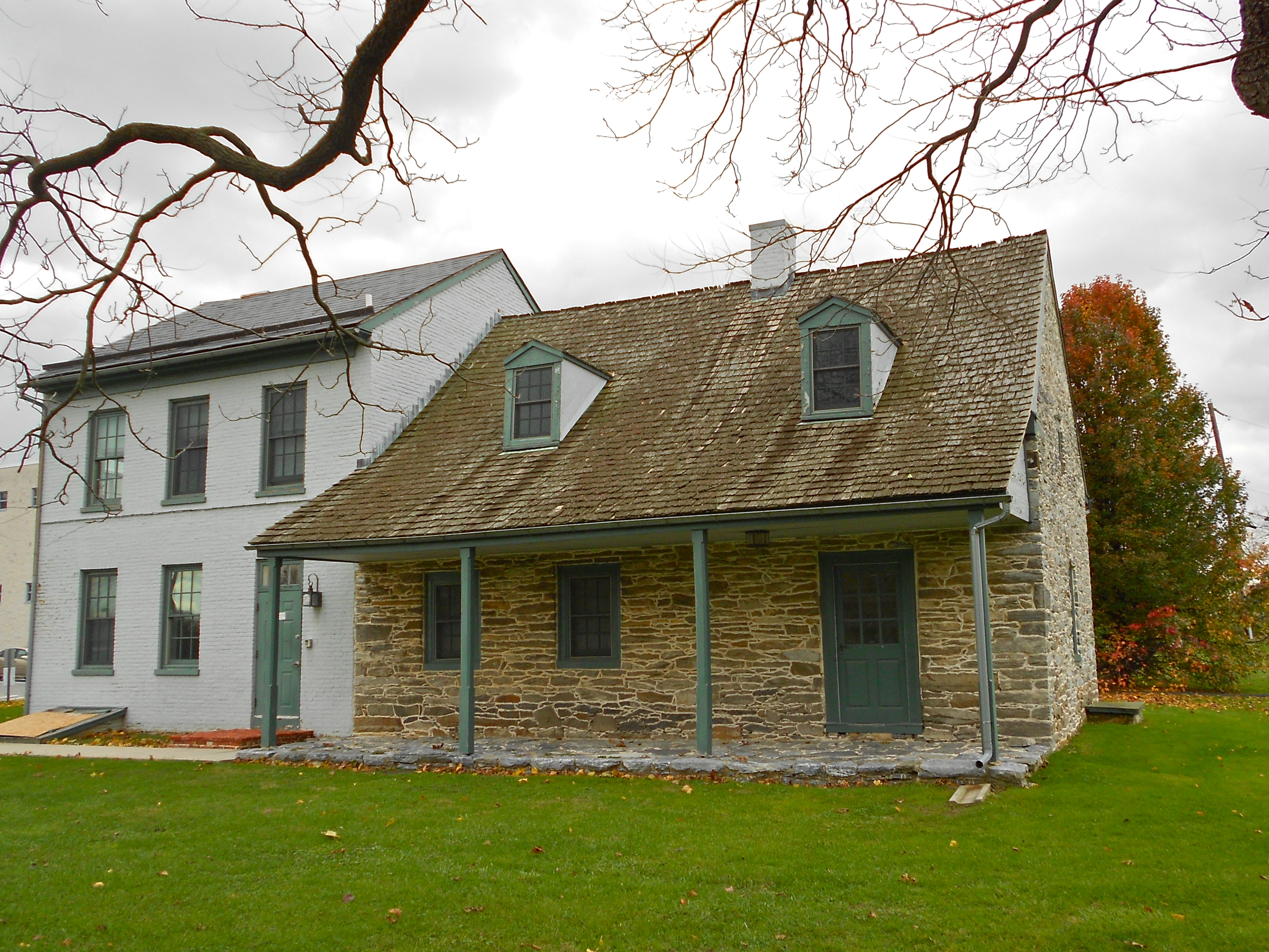
The oldest of the house's three sections, middle at left

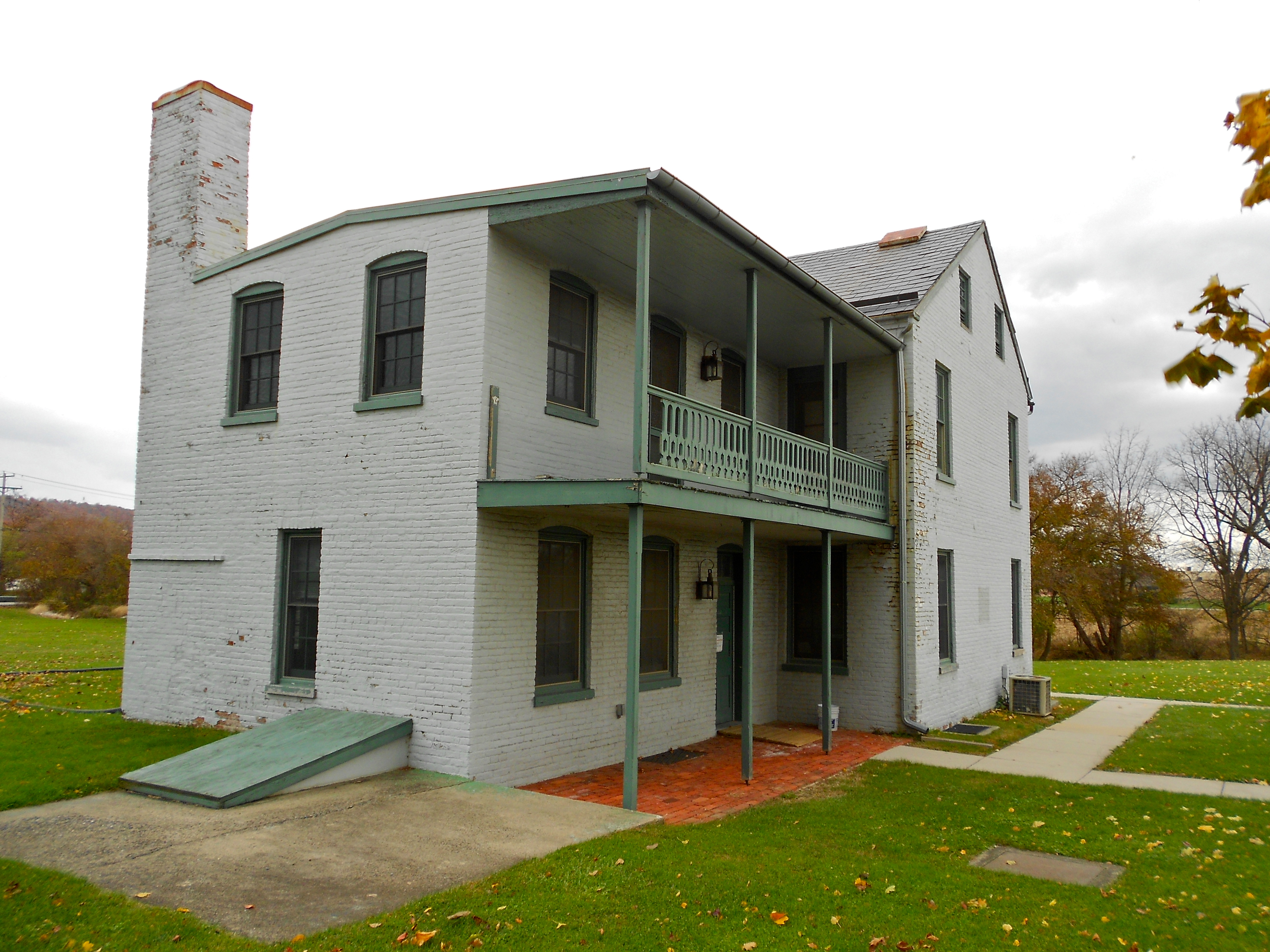
The house's newest section, middle section behind it
