= Central York High School =

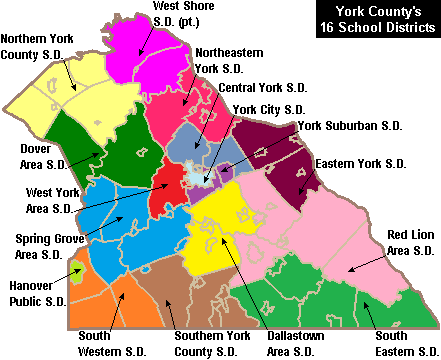

Location
- 601 Mundis Mill Road; York, York County, Pennsylvania 17406; United States; 40°00′52″N 76°42′02″W

Information
- Type: Public
- School district: Central York School District
- Principal: Dave Czarnecki
- Faculty: 107 teachers (2012)
- Teaching staff: 112.20 (FTE)
- Grades: 9–12
- Enrollment: 1,800 (2023–2024)
- Student to teacher ratio: 16.04
- Language: English
- Campus type: Suburban/Rural
- Colors: Orange and Black
- Mascot: Panther
- Website: http://www.cysd.k12.pa.us/

Central York High School is a large, suburban, public high school in Springettsbury Township, York County, Pennsylvania. Located at 601 Mundis Mill Road, it is the sole high school operated by the Central York School District. In the 2017–2018 school year, enrollment was reported as 1,865 pupils in 9th through 12th grades.

== Extracurriculars ==
Central York School District offers a wide variety of clubs, activities and an extensive sports program.

=== Sports ===
The district funds:

Varsity
Boys

- Baseball – AAAA
- Basketball – AAAA
- Cross Country – AAA
- Football – AAAA
- Golf – AAA
- Indoor Track and Field – AAAA
- Lacrosse – AAAA
- Soccer – AAA
- Swimming and Diving – AAA
- Tennis – AAA
- Track and Field – AAA
- Volleyball – AAA
- Water Polo – AAA
- Wrestling – AAA

Girls

- Basketball – AAAA
- Cheer – AAAA
- Cross Country – AAA
- Field Hockey – AAA
- Golf – AAA
- Indoor Track and Field – AAAA
- Lacrosse – AAAA
- Soccer (Fall) – AAA
- Softball – AAA
- Swimming and Diving – AAA
- Girls' Tennis – AAA
- Track and Field – AAA
- Volleyball – AAA
- Water Polo – AAAA

According to PIAA directory July 2014

== Notable alumni ==
- Ben Beshore, NASCAR Cup Series crew chief for Kyle Busch
- John Fetterman, U.S. senator from Pennsylvania (2023–present)
- J Robert Spencer Tony award nominated actor
- Neal Dodson American film producer
