= Pleasureville, Pennsylvania =

Unincorporated place in Pennsylvania, US

- Census-designated place
- Location within Pennsylvania Location within the United States
- Coordinates: 39°59′49″N 76°42′34″W
- Country: United States
- State: Pennsylvania
- County: York
- Township: Springettsbury

Area
  - Total: 1.37 sq mi (3.54 km^{2})
  - Land: 1.37 sq mi (3.54 km^{2})
  - Water: 0 sq mi (0.00 km^{2})
- Elevation: 561 ft (171 m)

Population (2020)
  - Total: 2,635
  - Density: 1,929.0/sq mi (744.81/km^{2})
- Time zone: UTC-5 (Eastern (EST))
  - Summer (DST): UTC-4 (EDT)
- ZIP Code: 17406 (York)
- Area codes: 717/223
- FIPS code: 42-61520
- GNIS feature ID: 2805586

Pleasureville is a suburban unincorporated community and census-designated place (CDP) in York County, Pennsylvania, United States. It was first listed as a CDP prior to the 2020 census.

Pleasureville is in central York County, in the northwestern part of Springettsbury Township, 3 miles (5 km) north of York, the county seat. It is bordered to the northwest by Codorus Creek, a northeastward-flowing tributary of the Susquehanna River. Manchester Township is to the northwest across Codorus Creek.

The center of the community comprises the Pleasureville Historic District, listed on the National Register of Historic Places.

== Demographics ==
Historical population
Census	Pop.	Note	%±
2020	2,635		—
U.S. Decennial Census
