= Pleasureville Historic District =

Historic district in Pennsylvania, United States

- U.S. National Register of Historic Places
- U.S. Historic district
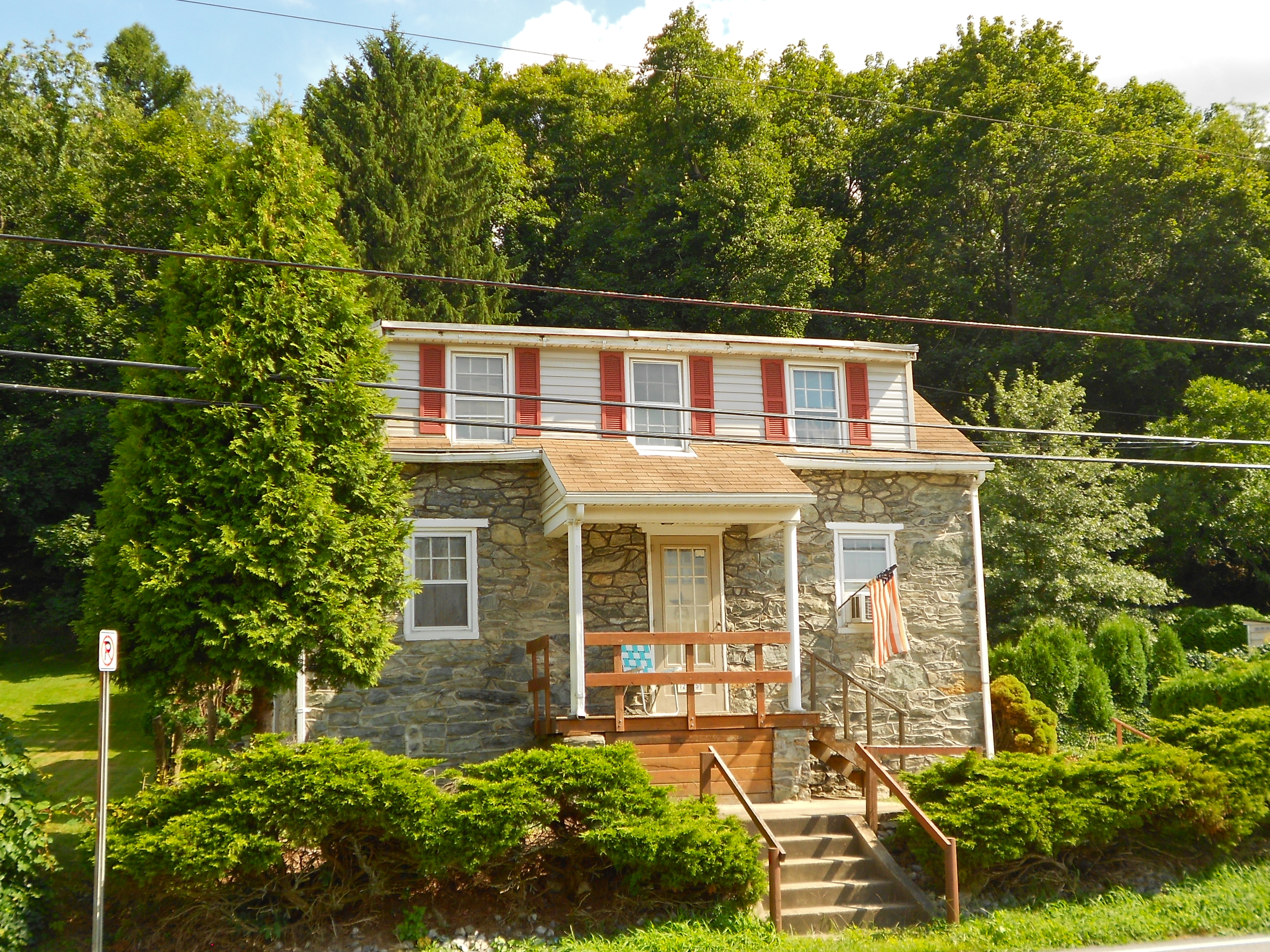

- Location within Pennsylvania Location within the United States
- Location: Roughly along North Sherman Street between Cherry Lane and Park View Road in Springettsbury, Springettsbury Township, Pennsylvania
- Coordinates: 40°00′09″N 76°42′17″W
- Area: 35.1 acres (14.2 ha)
- Architectural style: Colonial Revival, Italianate
- NRHP reference No.: 00000057
- Added to NRHP: February 18, 2000

The Pleasureville Historic District is a national historic district that is located in Springettsbury Township in York County, Pennsylvania.

The district was listed on the National Register of Historic Places in 2000.

== History and architectural features ==
This district includes 105 contributing buildings and one contributing site that are located in the crossroad community of Pleasureville. Most of the buildings are residential, including nineteenth-century, vernacular dwellings and notable examples of early twentieth-century Colonial Revival and Italianate-style structures. Notable non-residential buildings include a former schoolhouse (c. 1870), a meeting hall (c. 1875), a former store and accessory shop (c. 1860), and a small industrial shop (c. 1930).

The contributing site is the Pleasureville Cemetery with seventy-two marked graves that date between 1865 and 1929.
