= Central York School District =

School district in Pennsylvania

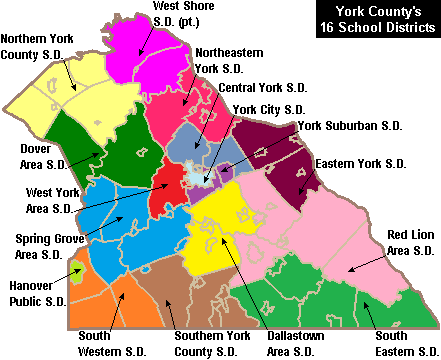

Address
- 775 Marion Road York, York County, Pennsylvania, 17406; United States

District information
- Type: Public

Students and staff
- District mascot: Panthers
- Colors: Orange and black

Other information
- Website: cysd.k12.pa.us

The Central York School District is a large, suburban, public school district that encompasses 24 square miles (62 km^{2}). Central York School District serves: the Borough of North York and Manchester Township and the greater part of Springettsbury Township in York County, Pennsylvania. According to 2010 federal census data, it serves a resident population of 40,000 people. The educational attainment levels for the Central York School District community population (25 years old and over) were 89.7% high school graduates and 29.7% college graduates.

According to the Pennsylvania Budget and Policy Center, 31.3% of the district's pupils lived at 185% or below the Federal Poverty level as shown by their eligibility for the federal free or reduced price school meal programs in 2012. In 2009, the district residents' per capita income was $24,557 a year, while the median family income was $59,079. In the Commonwealth, the median family income was $49,501 and the United States median family income was $49,445, in 2010. In York County, the median household income was $57,494. By 2013, the median household income in the United States rose to $52,100.

Central York School District operates seven schools: Central York High School (9th–12th), Central York Middle School (7th–8th), Hayshire Elementary School (K–3rd), North Hills Elementary School (4th–6th), Roundtown Elementary School (K–3rd), Sinking Springs Elementary School (4th–6th) and Stony Brook Elementary School (K–3rd).

The school district received national attention for banning a number of anti-racism books from the curriculum and from school libraries in 2021, including books by and about Rosa Parks and Malala Yousafzai. The ban was reversed in September 2021 after protests by community members. In 2023 the school library removed Push.

== Extracurriculars ==
Central York School District offers a wide variety of clubs, activities and an extensive sports program. Eligibility for participation is determined by the school board. The district funds:

Varsity

Boys

- Baseball – AAAA
- Basketball – AAAA
- Bowling – AAA
- Cross Country – AAA
- Football – AAAA
- Golf – AAA
- Indoor Track and Field – AAAA
- Lacrosse – AAAA
- Soccer – AAA
- Swimming and Diving – AAA
- Tennis – AAA
- Track and Field – AAA
- Volleyball – AAA
- Water Polo – AAA
- Wrestling – AAA

Girls

- Basketball – AAAA
- Bowling – AAA
- Cheer – AAAA
- Cross Country – AAA
- Field Hockey – AAA
- Golf – AAA
- Indoor Track and Field – AAAA
- Lacrosse – AAAA
- Soccer – AAA
- Softball – AAA
- Swimming and Diving – AAA
- Girls' Tennis – AAA
- Track and Field – AAA
- Volleyball – AAA
- Water Polo – AAAA

Middle School Sports:

Boys

- Basketball
- Cross Country
- Football
- Soccer
- Track and Field
- Volleyball
- Wrestling

Girls

- Basketball
- Cross Country
- Field Hockey
- Soccer (Fall)
- Track and Field
- Volleyball

According to PIAA directory July 2014

Central York School District operates a Community Aquatics Program that includes a swim instruction program during non school hours, as well as permitting community members to use the indoor pool at specific times.

== Intermediate Unit ==
Lincoln Intermediate Unit (IU#12) region includes Adams County, Franklin County and York County. The agency provides Central York Schools, district home-schooled students and area private schools many services, including special education services, combined purchasing, and instructional technology services. It runs Summer Academy which offers both art and academic strands designed to meet the individual needs of gifted, talented, and high achieving students. Additional services include: Curriculum Mapping, Professional Development for school employees, Adult Education, Nonpublic School Services, Business Services, Migrant & ESL (English as a Second Language), Instructional Services, Special Education, Management Services, and Technology Services. It also provides a GED program to adults who want to earn a high school diploma and literacy programs. The Lincoln Intermediate Unit is governed by a 13-member board of directors, each a member of a local school board from the 25 school districts. Board members are elected by school directors of all 25 school districts for three-year terms that begin July 1. There are 29 intermediate units in Pennsylvania. They are funded by school districts, state and federal program-specific funding, and grants. IUs do not have the power to tax.

== History ==
The Central York School District traces its beginning to 1952, when representatives of North York Borough, Manchester Township and a portion of Springettsbury Township joined to form the Central Joint School System of York County.

=== 1950–1959 ===
- 1952: Articles of Agreement are signed, forming a district of about 29 square miles (75 km^{2}). The district includes the existing North York High School. The Central Joint Municipal School Authority of York County is created. Plans to add onto the high school are under way. The Springettsbury School is opened.
- 1954: The Central Joint School System is reorganized to the Union School District, and three individual Boards of Directors are merged into one. The Central High School opens. The first graduating class contains 86 students.
- 1955: Pleasureville Elementary School is completed.
- 1957: North Hills Elementary School is completed.
- 1959: The district completes an addition to Wilson Elementary School Building.

=== 1960–1969 ===
- 1960: North Hills Junior High School is completed, providing a second school for district students in grades 7–9.
- 1961: The student body held a sit-down strike in the cafeteria to protest the current skirt length requirements.
- 1962: A structure containing restrooms and concessions stands is completed at the Central High Athletic Complex.
- 1966: The Central York Union School District becomes the Central York School District as part of a statewide reorganization of school districts. C. Clinton Ruby, former supervising principal, is appointed as superintendent. Stony Brook Elementary School opens, and the district operates its first kindergarten.
- 1967: Central York School District joins with other districts to form the York County Area Vocational Technical School.

=== 1970–1979 ===
- 1970: An addition to the Hayshire Elementary School is completed.
- 1973: Construction begins on an addition to Central High School.
- 1975: The addition to Central High School is completed, and the ninth grade is moved to the Senior High School.
- 1976: The graduating class of Central High School is its largest in history, with 302 members.
- 1977: The district experiences a reduction in growth that leads to the closing of school buildings. The Springettsbury School building is closed to pupil enrollment.

=== 1980–1989 ===
- 1980: The Lightner Elementary School building is closed and is leased to the LIU to house special programs.
- 1981: The Wilson Elementary School, built in 1911, is closed. The building is sold to the Yorktowne Business
- 1982: The Pleasureville Elementary School is closed. The North Hills Junior High School becomes the Central York Middle School. The sixth grades are moved to that building.
- 1986: Enrollment begins to grow again
- 1988: A committee composed of board members, administrators, staff and community members recommends restructuring the elementary grades to provide for a district-wide school serving grades 4–5 and three schools serving grades K–3.

=== 1990–1999 ===
- 1990: The former Pleasureville School Building is converted to the current Educational Service Center. The ESC houses district administrators and support staff.
- 1991: North Hills Elementary School renovations are completed, and a new Roundtown Elementary School is completed and opened to students.
- 1994: A Distance Learning Laboratory is established on the Central York High School campus.
- 1996: The addition and renovation project at Central York Middle School is completed for the opening of school.
- 1997: The district approved the concept of a Career Academy program at Central York High School. The program would focus students in a career academy that would relate to a broad cluster of professional and technical occupations.

=== 2000–present ===
- 2001: The district purchases a 137-acre (0.55 km^{2}) tract of land on Mundis Mill Road for the new high school.
- 2003: Construction of the new high school begins.
- 2004: The district begins renovations to its three K–3 elementary schools
- 2005: The new Central York High School opens. It has capacity for 1,650 students.
- 2005: Central York's Football team made it to the state playoffs, the first York-Adams team to ever make it to the Pennsylvania AAAA football playoffs after an undefeated season. Led by York-Adams player of the year, Eric Schwartz along with 18 all-county players and 7 all-state players.
- 2006: The district restructures the elementary grade levels so that students are grouped in grades K–3 and 4–6. The middle school will house students in grades 7–8. Renovated Hayshire, Roundtown, and Stony Brook Elementary Schools are open for the start of the 2006–2007 school year.
- 2007: The high school undergoes more construction. New classrooms and a swimming pool are to be added to the school.
- 2008: Construction continues and is completed on an expansion at Central York High School. There are 22 new classroom spaces and an expanded cafeteria facility. Construction is completed on the Central York Community Natatorium, and a Grand Opening Celebration held in December 2008 honors the completion of this valuable community resource.
- 2009: The district experiences a transition in leadership when Dr. Linda Estep, superintendent, retires January 1 after serving the district in various capacities for nearly 25 years. Dr. Michael S. Snell, who served as assistant superintendent since 2007, is named superintendent of the Central York School District.
- 2010: Central York High School students Evan Fisher and Alejandro Aguilar win the National Championship for the JA Titan Challenge, placing first out of several thousand competitors in a technology business strategy competition.
- 2011: Central York High School Varsity Volleyball Team wins the Pennsylvania State Championship. Coach Brad Livingston's first in his career.
- 2014: Central York High School was the focus of national news when the school was visited by Nina Davuluri, Miss America 2014. Student Patrick Farves asked Davuluri to the prom during a Q&A session, leading school administrators to give him "a three-day in-school suspension, which require[d] him to sit in a classroom and work alone." Davuluri responded on Facebook, asking that his suspension be revoked: "On Thursday, a student invited me to prom and gave me a flower while I was giving a presentation in York, Pennsylvania. I was flattered by the gesture, although I am unfortunately unable to attend due to my travel schedule. I later learned of the disciplinary action taken and reached out to the school in hopes that they will reconsider their decision." School administratrators justified the suspension by stating that it is not their "practice to discipline a student for asking someone – even Miss America – to a school dance ... however, it is our practice to set expectations for student behavior, to communicate those expectations and rules to students and families and to ensure those rules are followed within our schools." Farves later regretted the joke, noting that his "mother is white and his father is black" and stating that his actions "overshadowed" Davuluri's platform: "she was trying to get across a very strong message – about how it's not about your beliefs or the color of your skin, but who you are."
