= East York, Pennsylvania =

Unincorporated place in Pennsylvania, US

East York
- Census-designated place
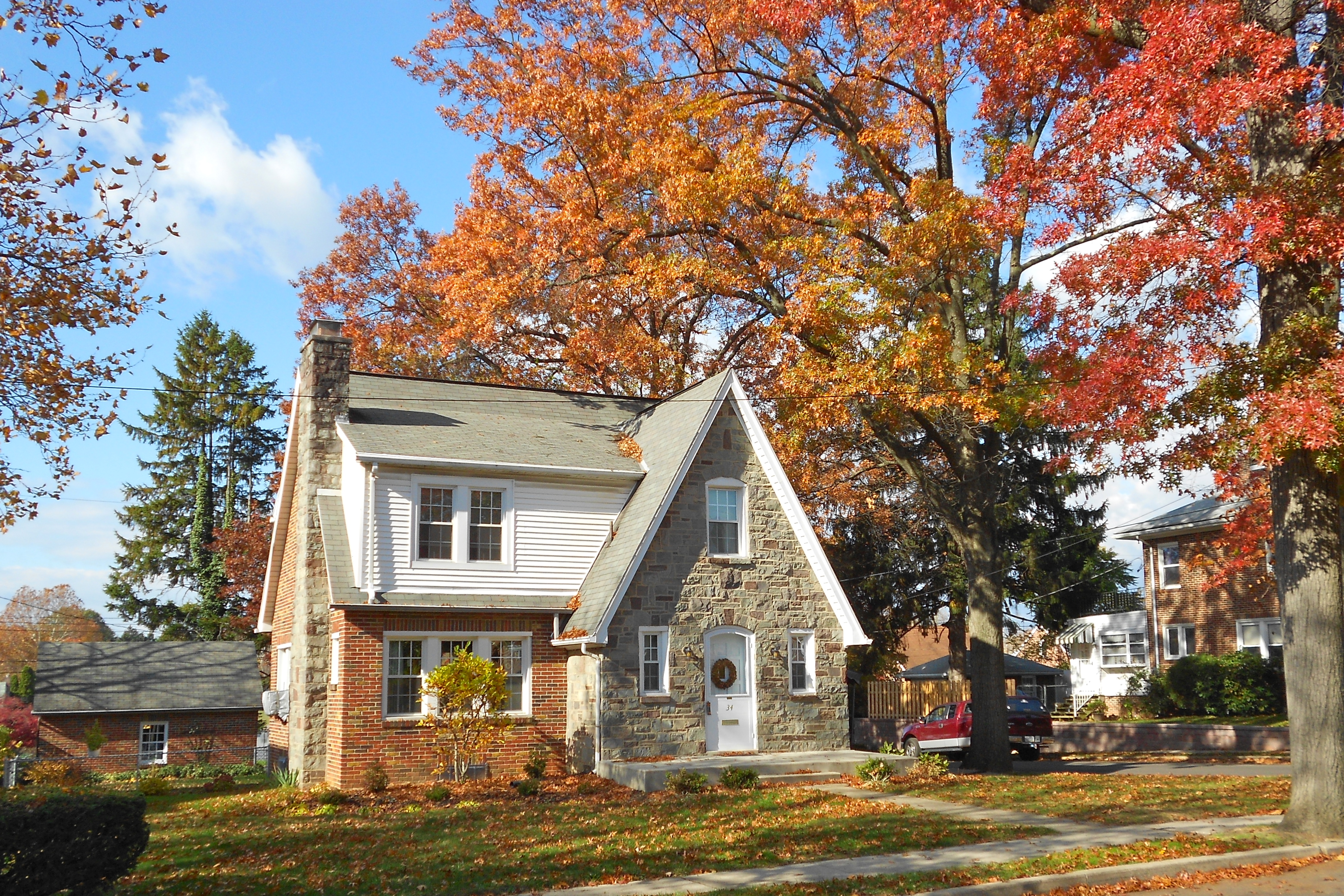
- House on Manheim Street

- Location in York County and the U.S. state of Pennsylvania.
- Coordinates: 39°58′07″N 76°40′32″W
- Country: United States
- State: Pennsylvania
- County: York
- Township: Springettsbury

Area
  - Total: 2.78 sq mi (7.20 km^{2})
  - Land: 2.78 sq mi (7.20 km^{2})
  - Water: 0 sq mi (0.00 km^{2})
- Elevation: 449 ft (137 m)

Population (2020)
  - Total: 9,555
  - Density: 3,439.5/sq mi (1,327.99/km^{2})
- Time zone: UTC-5 (Eastern (EST))
  - Summer (DST): UTC-4 (EDT)
- ZIP code: 17402
- Area code: 717
- FIPS code: 42-22104
- GNIS feature ID: 2389452

East York is a census-designated place (CDP) in York County, Pennsylvania, United States. The population was 8,777 at the 2010 census.

== Geography ==
East York is located within Springettsbury Township just east of the city of York.

According to the United States Census Bureau, the CDP has a total area of 2.9 square miles (7.5 km^{2}), all land.

== History ==
The suburb of East York was developed in 1903 with the foresight that industrial expansion would attract a great increase in population. John H. Longstreet's vision foresaw the pathway of expansion.

Many beautiful homes were soon built and more building lots awaited new owners.

Known to many as the Keesey Tract, the East York area was listed as "fronting, for two-thirds of a mile, on both sides of Market Street, York's main thoroughfare, and part of the Great Lincoln Highway." Only an eleven-minute ride from Center Square in York, it featured high ground with perfect natural drainage, cement walks and curbs, macadamized streets, pure filtered water, electric lights, and a complete sewer system.

The York Railways Company lines ran the entire length of Market Street through the center of the tract and to adjoining boroughs. For a single carfare, one could ride the entire length of Market Street.

The East York area offered its members all the privileges of an up-to-date club. Any resident could be member and enjoy its privileges, including dining services, games, lawn tennis, and the entire social advantages attendant thereto. The club's privileges were also open to members' families.

On East Market Street and nearby stood the area residences of George L. Stallman, Charles E. Tucker, Mahlon N. Haines, Congressman E.S. Brooks, Professor C.B. Heinly, Cleaver and Merrihew, William J. Gribben, E. P. Minnich, Dr. J.E. Barrick, and Sarah J. Mitzel.

The East York Historic District is listed on the National Register of Historic Places.

=== Hiestand School ===
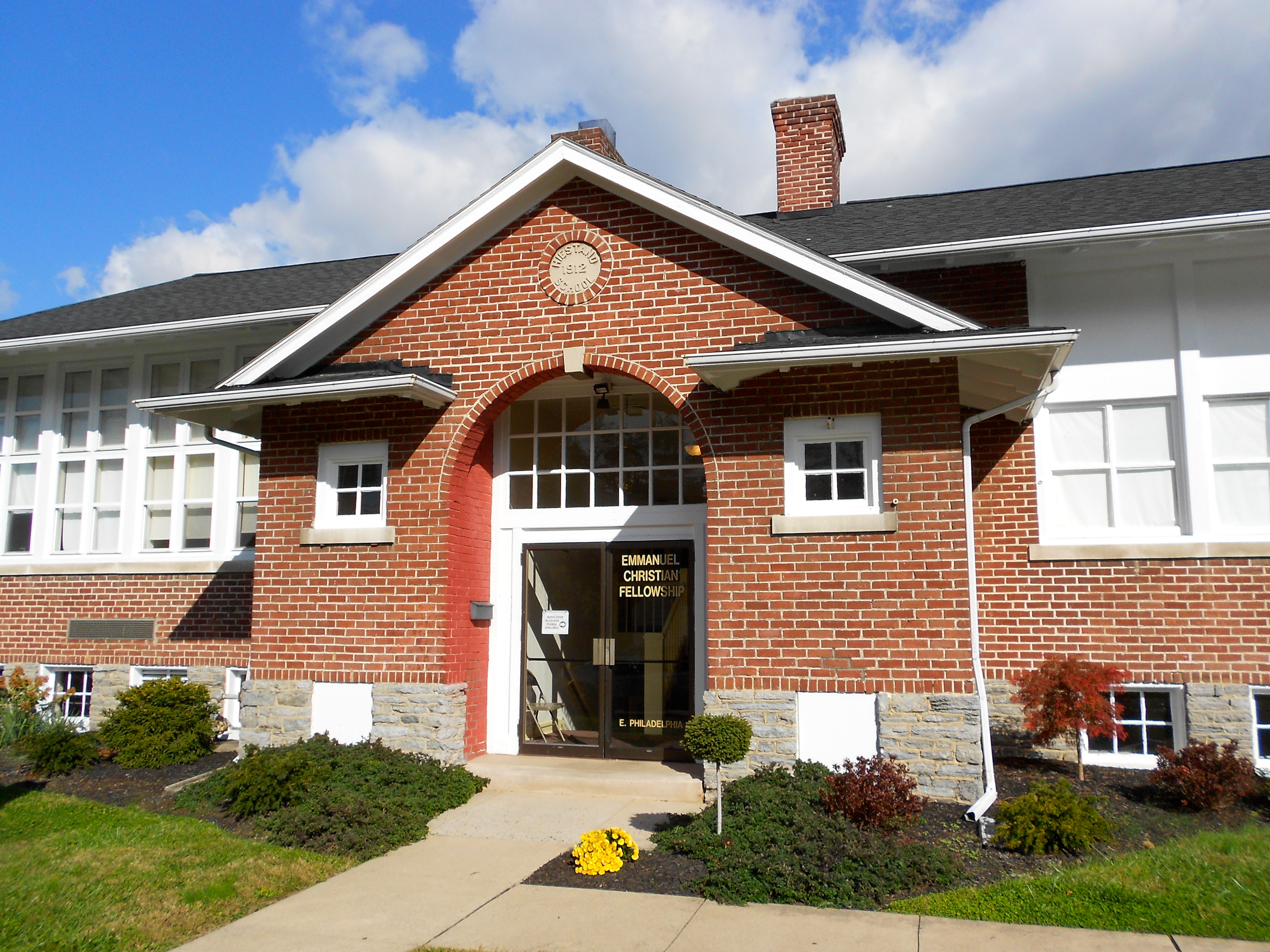
Hiestand School

In 1912, the John S. Hiestand School was built in the area on land donated by John S. Longstreet. This school was built in what was then the Independent School District. A graded school, managed by a progressive Board of Directors, its students were taught by competent teachers in all grades from first to eighth and prepared for entrance into York High School.

There, tuition was paid for by the Independent School District under an agreement with the city school board.

The first consideration in designing and erecting the building was the children's welfare. The building was located in the center of ample playgrounds, had two classrooms, boys' and girls' cloakrooms, functional toilets, and large basement playrooms for use in bad weather. The school, where all students and residents could obtain free use of well-selected books, also maintained a public library.

The original two classrooms were doubled to four in 1927 and there were six rooms by 1937. The Hiestand School was closed in June 1978 for financial reasons and due to declining enrollment, and has been used subsequently by various community organizations.

== Demographics ==
Historical population
Census	Pop.	Note	%±
2020	9,555		—
U.S. Decennial Census

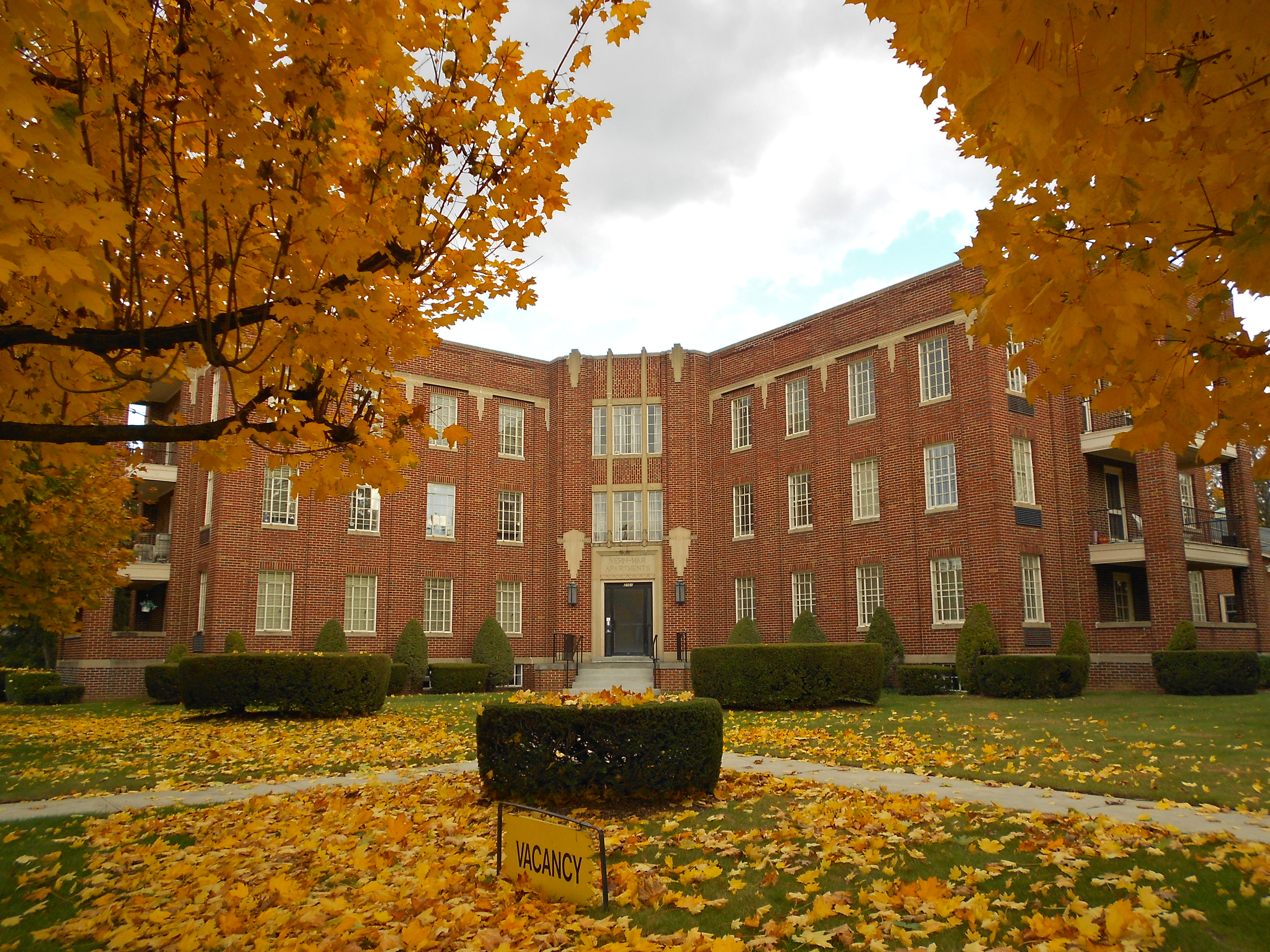
Apartment building on Market Street

As of the census of 2000, there were 8,782 people, 3,726 households, and 2,455 families residing in the CDP. The population density was 3,032.5 people per square mile (1,170.9 people/km^{2}). There were 3,843 housing units at an average density of 1,327.0 per square mile (512.4/km^{2}). The racial makeup of the CDP was 94.50% White, 1.49% African American, 0.16% Native American, 2.40% Asian, 0.06% Pacific Islander, 0.65% from other races, and 0.74% from two or more races. Hispanic or Latino of any race were 1.34% of the population.

There were 3,726 households, out of which 23.8% had children under the age of 18 living with them, 56.4% were married couples living together, 7.1% had a female householder with no husband present, and 34.1% were non-families. 29.6% of all households were made up of individuals, and 15.5% had someone living alone who was 65 years of age or older. The average household size was 2.24 and the average family size was 2.77.

In the CDP, the population was spread out, with 18.8% under the age of 18, 5.4% from 18 to 24, 24.4% from 25 to 44, 23.9% from 45 to 64, and 27.5% who were 65 years of age or older. The median age was 46 years. For every 100 females, there were 85.8 males. For every 100 females age 18 and over, there were 82.0 males.

The median income for a household in the CDP was $48,689, and the median income for a family was $57,461. Males had a median income of $43,614 versus $30,855 for females. The per capita income for the CDP was $24,883. About 1.5% of families and 3.1% of the population were below the poverty line, including 0.4% of those under age 18 and 4.9% of those age 65 or over.

== Education ==
The CDP is located in the York Suburban School District.
