= Turkey Hill Dairy =

American based food and beverage company

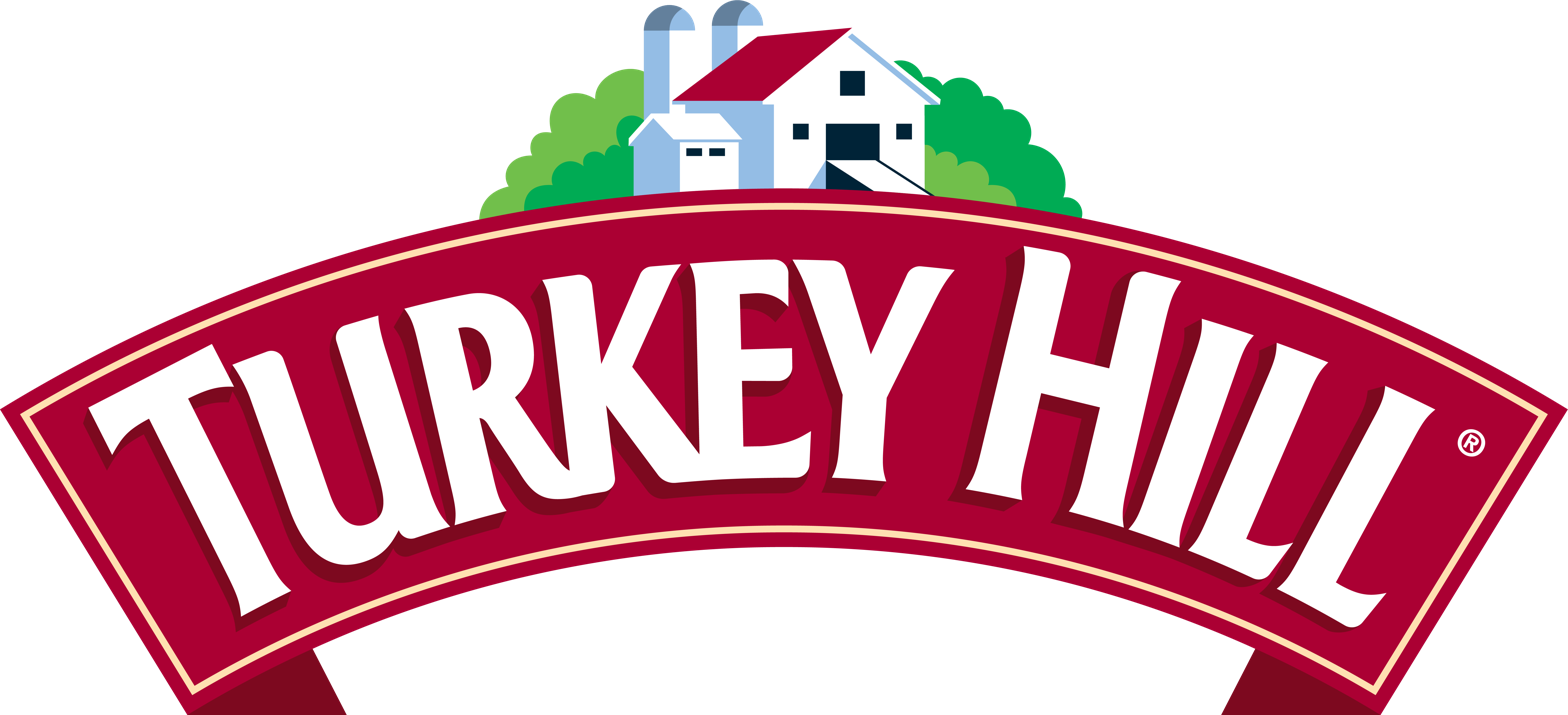
- Industry: Dairy manufacturer
- Founded: 1931; 95 years ago in Lancaster County, Pennsylvania, U.S.
- Founder: Armor Frey
- Headquarters: Conestoga, Pennsylvania, U.S.
- Area served: Worldwide
- Key people: Andy Jacobs (CEO)
- Products: Beverages, ice cream, frozen desserts
- Number of employees: 800
- Website: turkeyhill.com

Turkey Hill Dairy, or simply known as Turkey Hill, is an American brand of iced tea, ice cream, and other beverages and frozen desserts distributed throughout the United States and internationally. The company, which is headquartered in Conestoga, Pennsylvania, was a subsidiary of Kroger from 1985 until it was sold to private equity firm Peak Rock Capital in 2019.

The company is operated independently from Turkey Hill Minit Markets, a chain of more than 260 gas station convenience stores that carry Turkey Hill products in Pennsylvania, Ohio and Indiana.

In 2011 Turkey Hill opened The Turkey Hill Experience, a 17,000-square-foot (1,600-square-meter) attraction based in Columbia, Pennsylvania that pays homage to Turkey Hill's history while highlighting its ice cream and iced tea-making processes.

== Turkey Hill Dairy ==
=== History ===
Turkey Hill Dairy began in 1931 during the Great Depression, when farmer Armor Frey began selling bottled milk to neighbors from his sedan. Frey's family obtained the farm directly from Thomas and Richard Penn, sons of William Penn, and the sheepskin deed to the farm refers to "turkeyhill". Turkey Hill Ridge had been given its name by the Conestoga Indians for the wild turkeys found there, so the family decided to name their dairy after the name on the deed and the nearby geographical feature.

Armor sold the dairy to sons Glen, Emerson and Charles Frey in 1947. Milking the cows and delivering milk to customers provided these three families with a satisfactory income.

In 1954, the dairy began making ice cream, which sold well in Lancaster County, and in 1981, they started selling the ice cream through a few independent stores in Philadelphia. Turkey Hill quickly began to expand into New Jersey and up the East Coast. In the early 2000s Turkey Hill's products were distributed in places further west, such as Buffalo, Pittsburgh, and Cleveland. Over the next few years, Turkey Hill rapidly expanded its distribution area, and its teas are now sold in 45 states and the ice cream is now sold in 43 states.

==== Ownership and leadership ====
The dairy and the stores were sold in 1985 to Dillons, a subsidiary of Kroger. Despite the new ownership, the Frey family was heavily involved in the day-to-day operations of the company, as Charles Frey, the youngest of company founder Armor Frey's sons, remained as president. Charles was succeeded as president by Quintin Frey (son of Emerson Frey) in 1991. On May 28, 2013, the Kroger Company announced Quintin Frey's retirement.

==== Wind turbines ====
In 2011 Turkey Hill partnered with PPL Renewable Energy and the Lancaster County Solid Waste Management Authority to purchase the electricity generated by two General Electric wind turbines on the Frey Farm landfill adjacent to the company's manufacturing facility. The wind turbines are capable of producing enough power to supply 25 percent of the company's annual electricity demand.

=== Products ===
In 2012 Turkey Hill Dairy produced 29 million U.S. gallons (110,000,000 liters) of frozen dairy dessert, 56.6 million US gallons (214,000,000 L) of iced tea and other drinks and 7.1 million US gallons (27,000,000 L) of milk. Since 2000, Turkey Hill has been among the nation's top-selling brands of refrigerated iced tea and, in 2011, was the fourth-largest producer of ice cream, after Nestlé (Dreyer's/Edy Grand, Häagen-Dazs, Mövenpick), Unilever (Breyers Ice Cream and Ben & Jerry's), and Wells' Dairy (Blue Bunny).

==== Ice cream ====
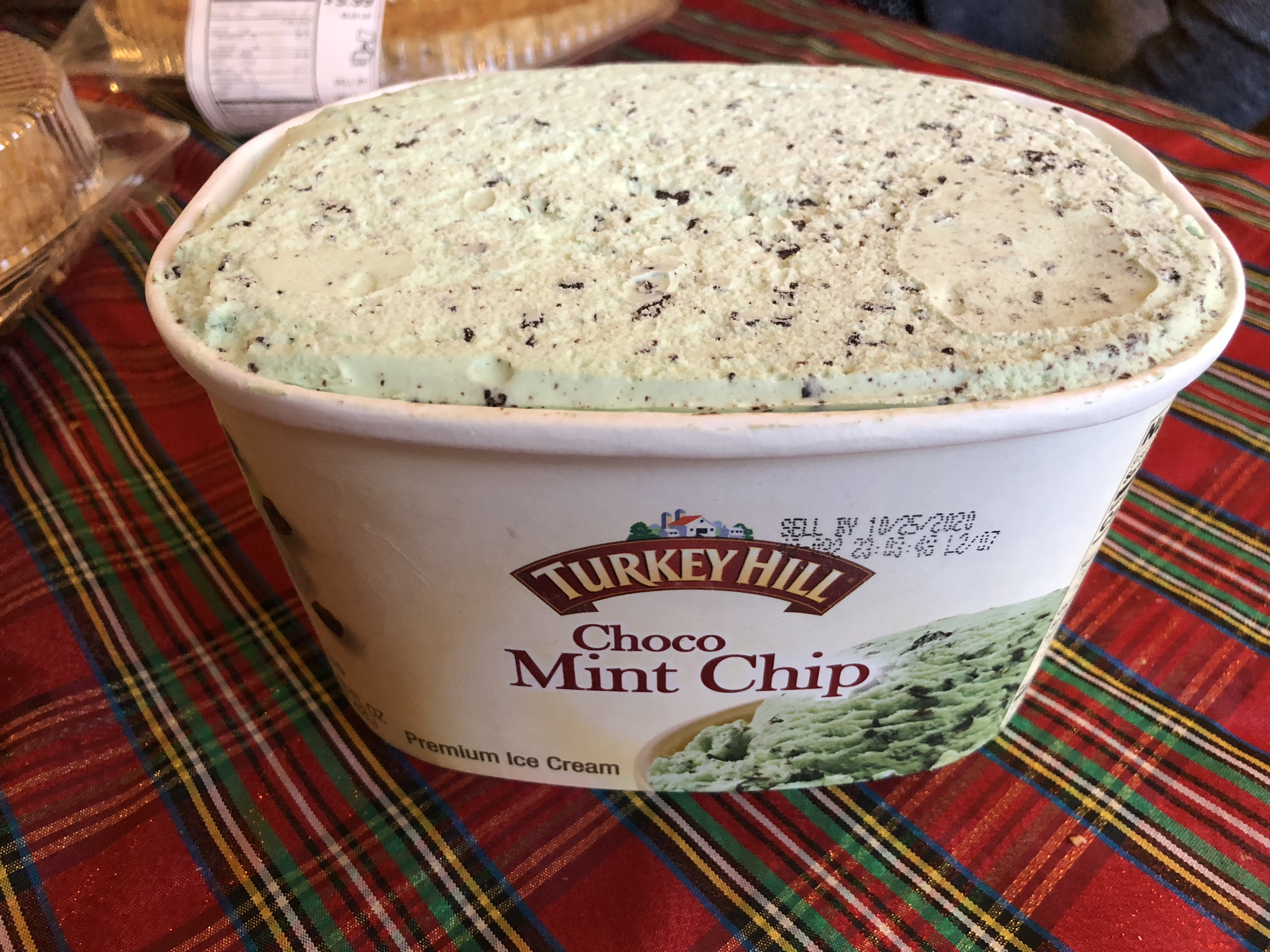
Turkey Hill Mint Chocolate Chip ice cream

Turkey Hill produces 63 full-time and Limited Edition flavors of ice cream, frozen dairy dessert, and sherbet available in 46-US-fluid-ounce (1,400 mL), 1-US-pint (470 mL) sizes and 3-US-gallon (11 L) sizes for use by ice cream shops. Specific product lines include Premium Ice Cream, All Natural Ice Cream, and No Sugar Added, frozen dairy dessert (a vegetable-oil based product similar to ice cream) and sherbet.

==== Iced tea ====
The Turkey Hill Iced Tea lineup includes more than 20 seasonal and full-time flavors. Traditional flavors are made with a manufacturing process that includes cold bottling, cold shipping and cold storage in stores.

==== Other beverages ====
Other Turkey Hill beverages include fruit drinks, including lemonade, fruit punch, and others, milk (fat free, 1% lowfat, 2% reduced fat, whole milk, and 1% low fat chocolate milk), and egg nog distributed during the Christmas season.

==== Partnerships and sponsorships ====
Turkey Hill Dairy has partnerships with the Snyder's of Hanover, Gertrude Hawk Chocolates, and Tootsie Roll Industries' Junior Mints, allowing the company to produce and distribute theme-flavored ice cream based on the products of these companies.

Turkey Hill no longer maintains partnerships with several professional sports teams, including the Lancaster Stormers, Camden Riversharks, and the York Revolution, all of the Atlantic League of Professional Baseball.

Additional sports partnerships have included Major League Soccer's Philadelphia Union, Major League Baseball's Philadelphia Phillies and the New York Yankees, and the National Football League's Philadelphia Eagles and Pittsburgh Steelers. The company's relationships with the Philadelphia Phillies, New York Yankees, Philadelphia Eagles, and Pittsburgh Steelers included the manufacture of official team ice cream flavors.

== Turkey Hill Experience ==
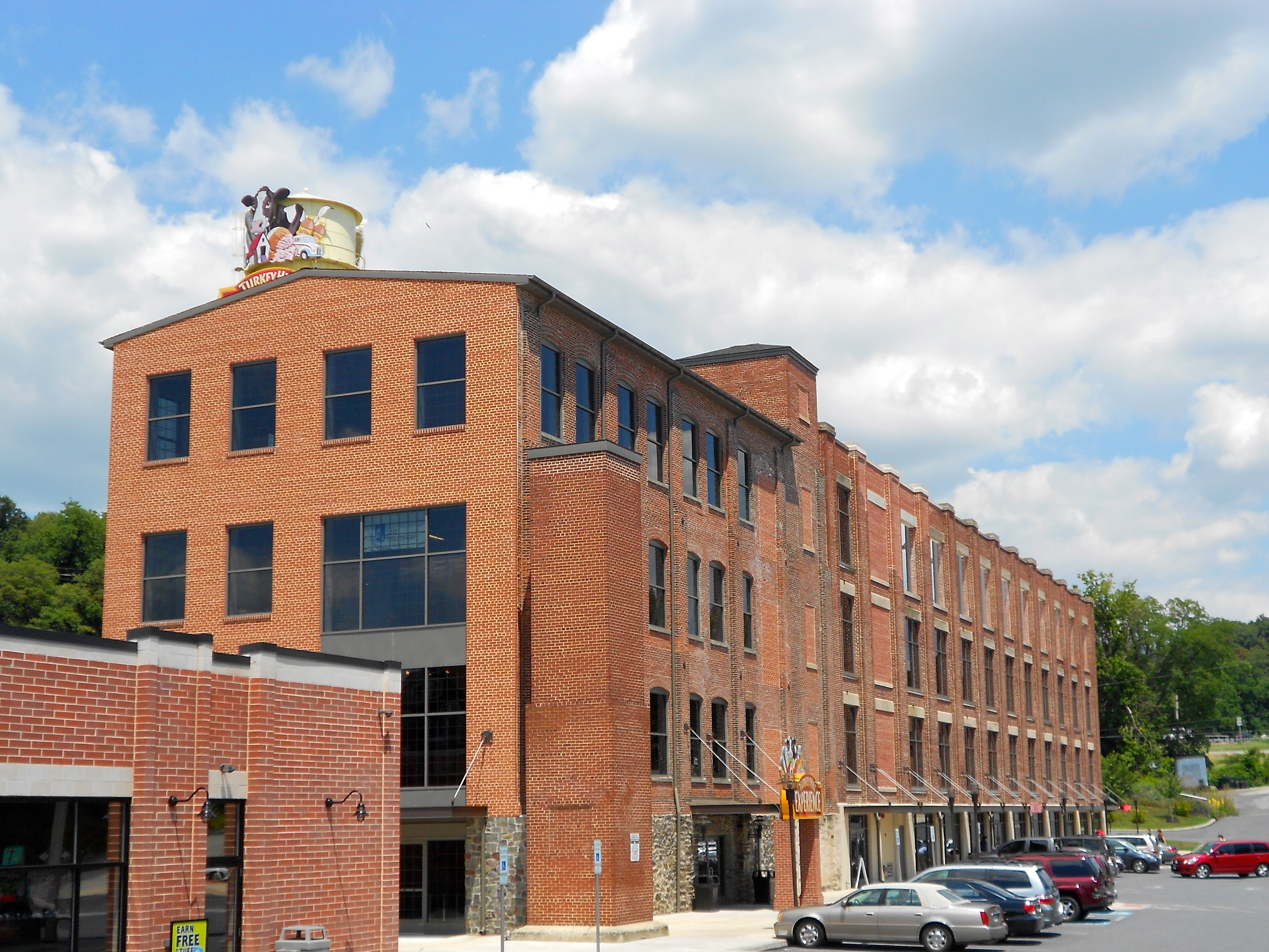
The Turkey Hill Experience building in Columbia, Pennsylvania

The Turkey Hill Experience is a 17,000 sq ft (1,600 m^{2}) attraction based in Lancaster County, Pennsylvania that pays homage to Turkey Hill Dairy's history while highlighting its ice cream and iced tea-making processes. It opened in June 2011 and is located in Columbia, Pennsylvania, six miles from the company's main production facility in Conestoga, Pennsylvania.

=== Displays and exhibits ===
The Turkey Hill Experience includes a variety of interactive displays aimed at entertaining both children and adults. In addition to learning about Turkey Hill Dairy's history and the iced tea and ice cream manufacturing processes, visitors can also make their own virtual ice cream flavor, an interactive process that uses green-screen technology to allow visitors to star in a Turkey Hill TV commercial. An exhibit called the Turkey Hill Taste Lab, opened in June 2013.

=== History ===
The Turkey Hill Experience is located in a former Ashley and Bailey silk mill, part of which was originally built in 1899. The location had several owners and uses in the decades that followed. It was abandoned in the late 1970s after the Tidy Products company stopped using it as a sewing factory.

The building was vacant for more than 25 years before Turkey Hill began to work with a developer to renovate it for new uses.

Two similar industrial mill buildings, the Ashley and Bailey Company Silk Mill in West York and the Ashley and Bailey Silk Mill in Marietta, have been listed on the National Register of Historic Places.

== See also ==
- Byrne Dairy
- Wawa (company)
