= Diamond Silk Mill =

Historic mill in York County, Pennsylvania, U.S.

- U.S. National Register of Historic Places
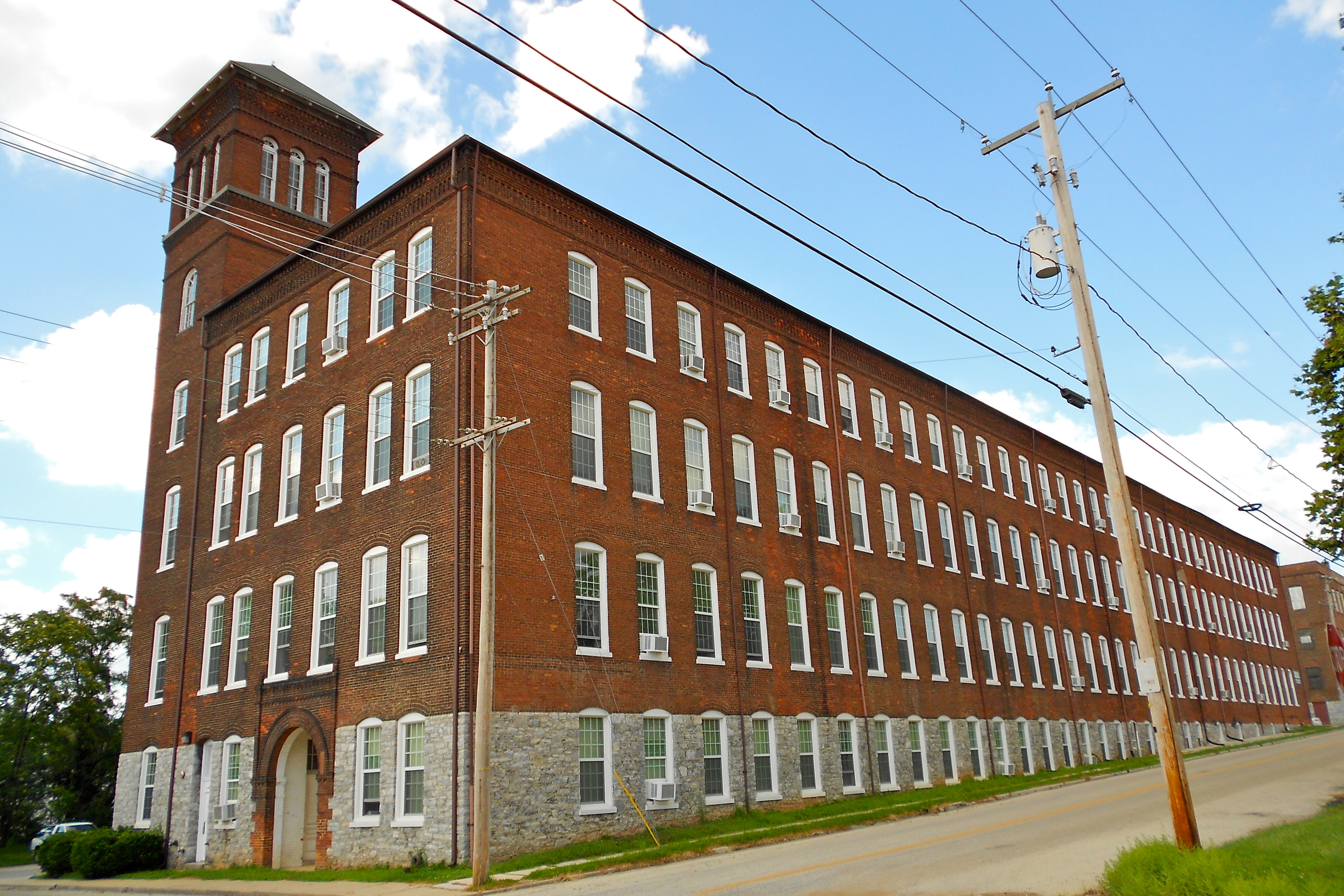
- View from Hay Street

- Location within Pennsylvania Location within the United States
- Location: Junction of Ridge Avenue and Hay Street in East York, Springettsbury Township, Pennsylvania
- Coordinates: 39°58′35″N 76°42′0″W
- Area: 9 acres (3.6 ha)
- Built: 1900
- Architect: Dempwolf, John A.
- Architectural style: Romanesque
- NRHP reference No.: 92000949
- Added to NRHP: July 24, 1992

Diamond Silk Mill, also known as York Silk Manufacturing Company, is a historic silk mill located at Springettsbury Township, York County, Pennsylvania. It was designed by architect John A. Dempwolf and built about 1900. The mill is a 3 1/2-story, brick building with heavy timber frame trussing on a stone foundation, and measures 50 feet by 300 feet. It has a hipped roof, and features an octagonal 100-foot high smokestack and decorative corbelled brick cornice in the Romanesque Revival style.

In 1910, the mill's business had increased such that it was noted by an industry periodical as becoming a full-time operation and hiring additional workers. Silk manufacturing would become one of York's most important industries, feeding Lancaster's manufacture of umbrellas. A decline began with the Great Depression and continued with the introduction of synthetic fibers in the late 1930s, for which most York mills did not have equipment.

The mill was added to the National Register of Historic Places in 1992.

== Gallery ==
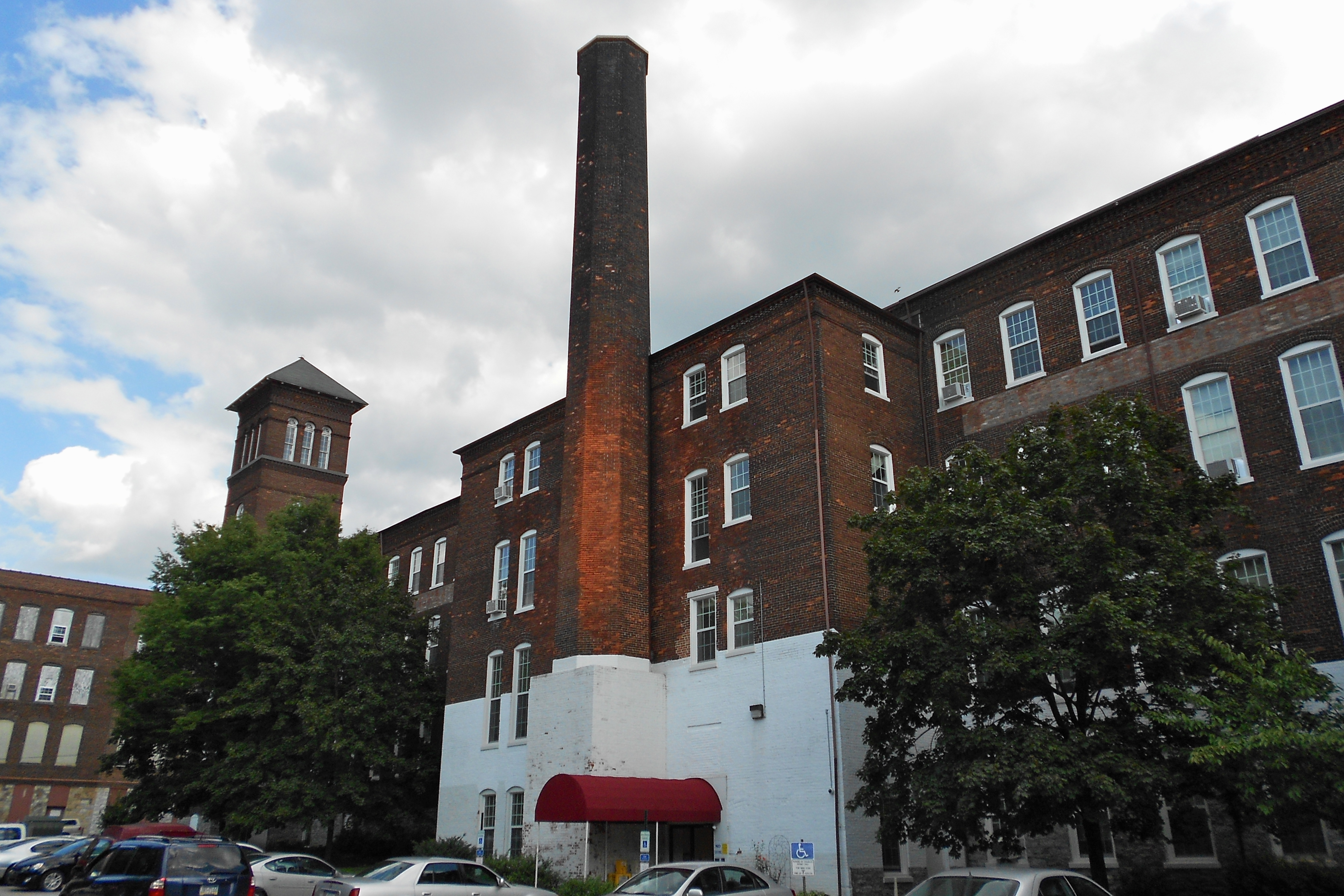
Interior court

== See also ==
- Ashley and Bailey Company Silk Mill, contemporary silk mill 4 miles west in West York, Pennsylvania
- Ashley and Bailey Silk Mill, contemporary silk mill 15 miles east in Marietta, Pennsylvania
