= Conestoga, Pennsylvania =

Unincorporated community in Pennsylvania, US

- Census-designated place
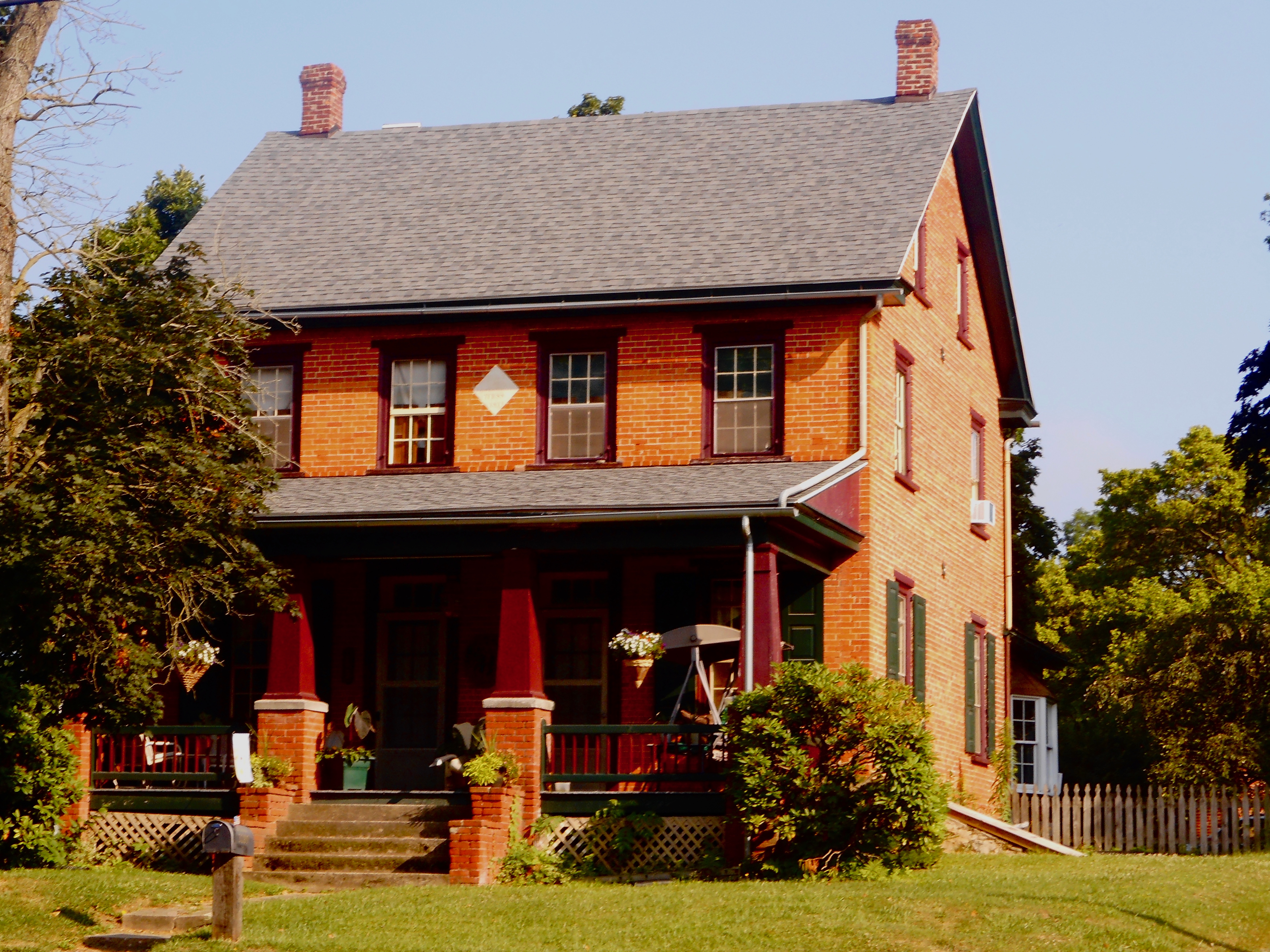
- Hess House, built 1811

- Location in Pennsylvania Location in the United States
- Coordinates: 39°56′26″N 76°20′46″W
- Country: United States
- State: Pennsylvania
- County: Lancaster
- Township: Conestoga

Area
  - Total: 2.08 sq mi (5.39 km^{2})
  - Land: 2.08 sq mi (5.38 km^{2})
  - Water: 0.0039 sq mi (0.01 km^{2})
- Elevation: 500 ft (150 m)

Population (2020)
  - Total: 1,163
  - Density: 560.1/sq mi (216.25/km^{2})
- Time zone: UTC-5 (Eastern (EST))
  - Summer (DST): UTC-4 (EDT)
- ZIP code: 17516
- FIPS code: 42-15584
- GNIS feature ID: 1172302

Conestoga (Pennsylvania German: Kanneschtooge) is an unincorporated community and census-designated place (CDP) in Conestoga Township, Lancaster County, Pennsylvania, United States. At the 2020 census, the population was 1,163. The Conestoga post office serves ZIP code 17516.

== History ==
Conestoga refers to the Conestoga people, the English name for the Susquehannock who had inhabited the area before European settlement. The name is thought to have been derived from kanastoge meaning "at the place of the immersed pole."

The name was also used for the Conestoga River which forms the northern boundary of Conestoga Township, and for Conestoga Manor, a large tract of land reserved by William Penn that was located north of the river in what is now Manor Township. Conestoga also referred to a succession of Susquehannock settlements located within Conestoga Manor. In 1763, the last of these settlements was destroyed and its inhabitants massacred by the Paxton Boys, a vigilante group of Scotch-Irish settlers from Lancaster County.

The town of Conestoga Centre in Conestoga Township was laid out in 1805 by John Kendig who had been operating a tavern at this location since 1790. By 1815, eleven families were living there. A tax list from 1815 lists John Kendig Sr., John Kendig Jr., Martin Kendig, Magdalene Ponper, Adam Brady, Cornelius Conrad, John Carry, Theophilus Dunning, Solomon Falk, Catherine Grummel, and Jacob Yentzer.

The headquarters of Turkey Hill Dairy, a food company specializing in iced teas and dairy products that was founded in 1931, has a Conestoga mailing address. It is located 7 miles (11 km) northwest of Conestoga in Manor Township.

The area was in the national news in 2001 when President George W. Bush held a photo opportunity at the Safe Harbor power station 4 miles (6 km) southwest of Conestoga.

== Geography ==
Conestoga is in southwestern Lancaster County, in the eastern part of Conestoga Township. It is situated between the Conestoga River to the northwest and Pequea Creek to the southeast. It is 7 miles (11 km) south-southwest of Lancaster, the county seat, and 3 miles (5 km) northeast of the Susquehanna River.

According to the U.S. Census Bureau, the Conestoga CDP has a total area of 2.1 square miles (5.4 km^{2}), of which 0.004 square miles (0.01 km^{2}), or 0.22%, are water.

== Demographics ==
At the 2020 census there were 1,163 people across 487 total housing units in the CDP with an occupancy rate of 99%. 907 were 18 years and over, making up 78% of the population. The racial makeup of the CDP was 93.1% White, 0.5% African American, 0.2% Native American, 0.61% Asian, 0% Pacific Islander, 1.29% from other races, and 2.45% from two or more races. Hispanic or Latino of any race were 3.4%.

Historical population
| Census | Pop. | Note | %± |
|---|---|---|---|
| 2010 | 1,258 | | — |
| 2020 | 1,163 | | −7.6% |
U.S. Decennial Census

== Photo gallery ==
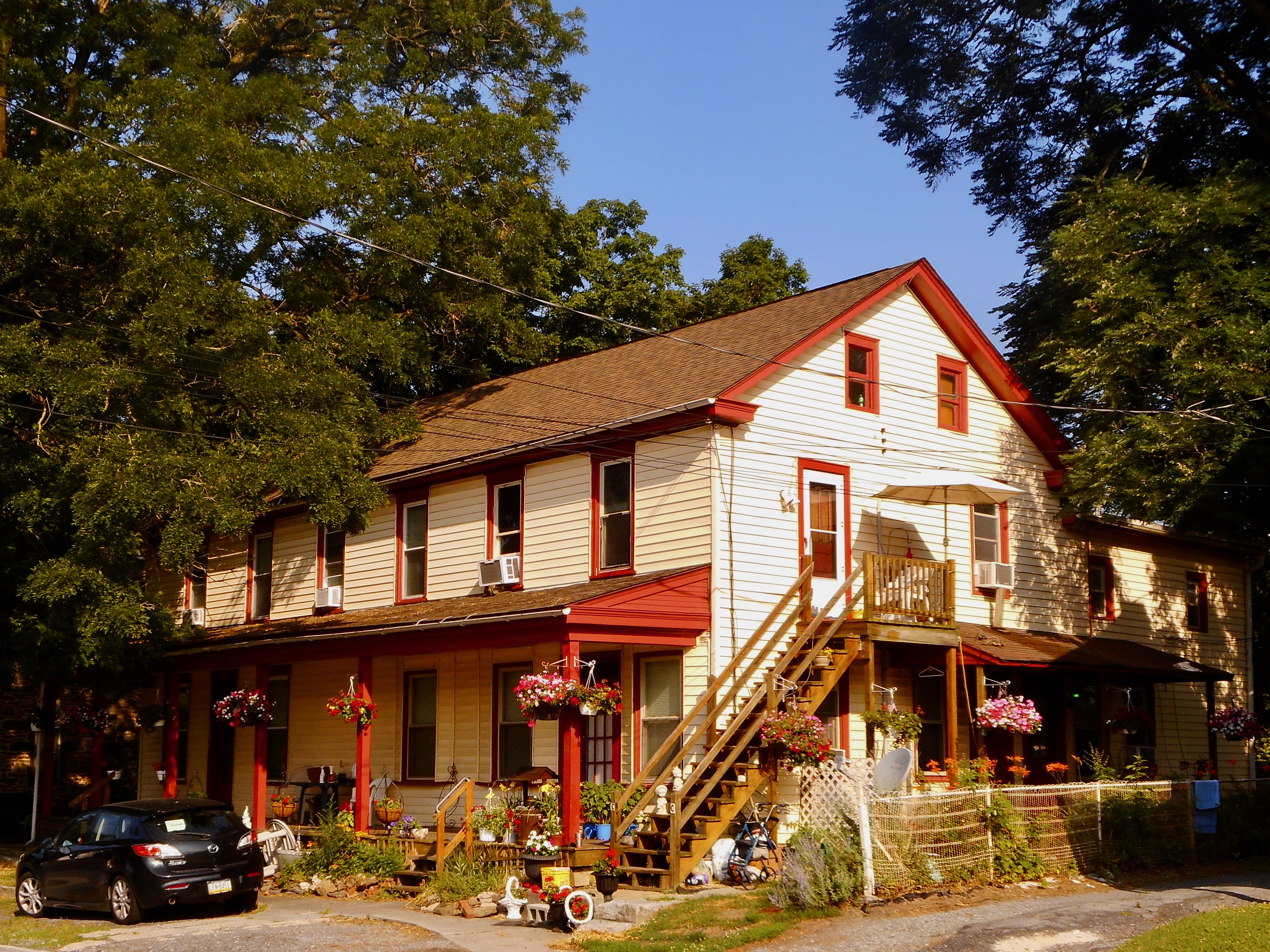
House on Main Street in Conestoga, Pennsylvania, located next to the Hess House which was built in 1811

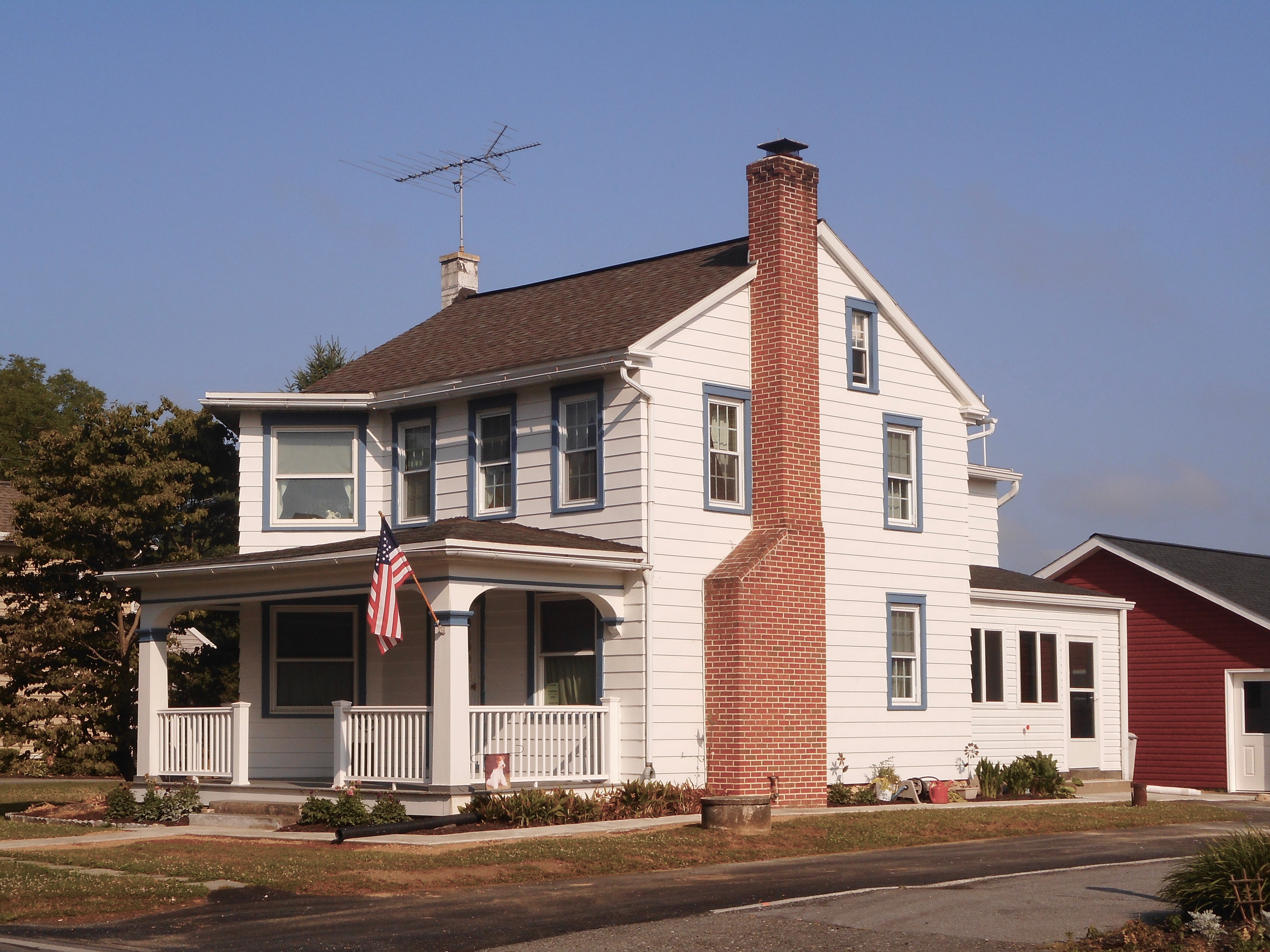
House on Main Street in Conestoga, Pennsylvania, located near the Hess House which was built in 1811
