= Byrne Dairy =

Regional dairy based in Syracuse, New York

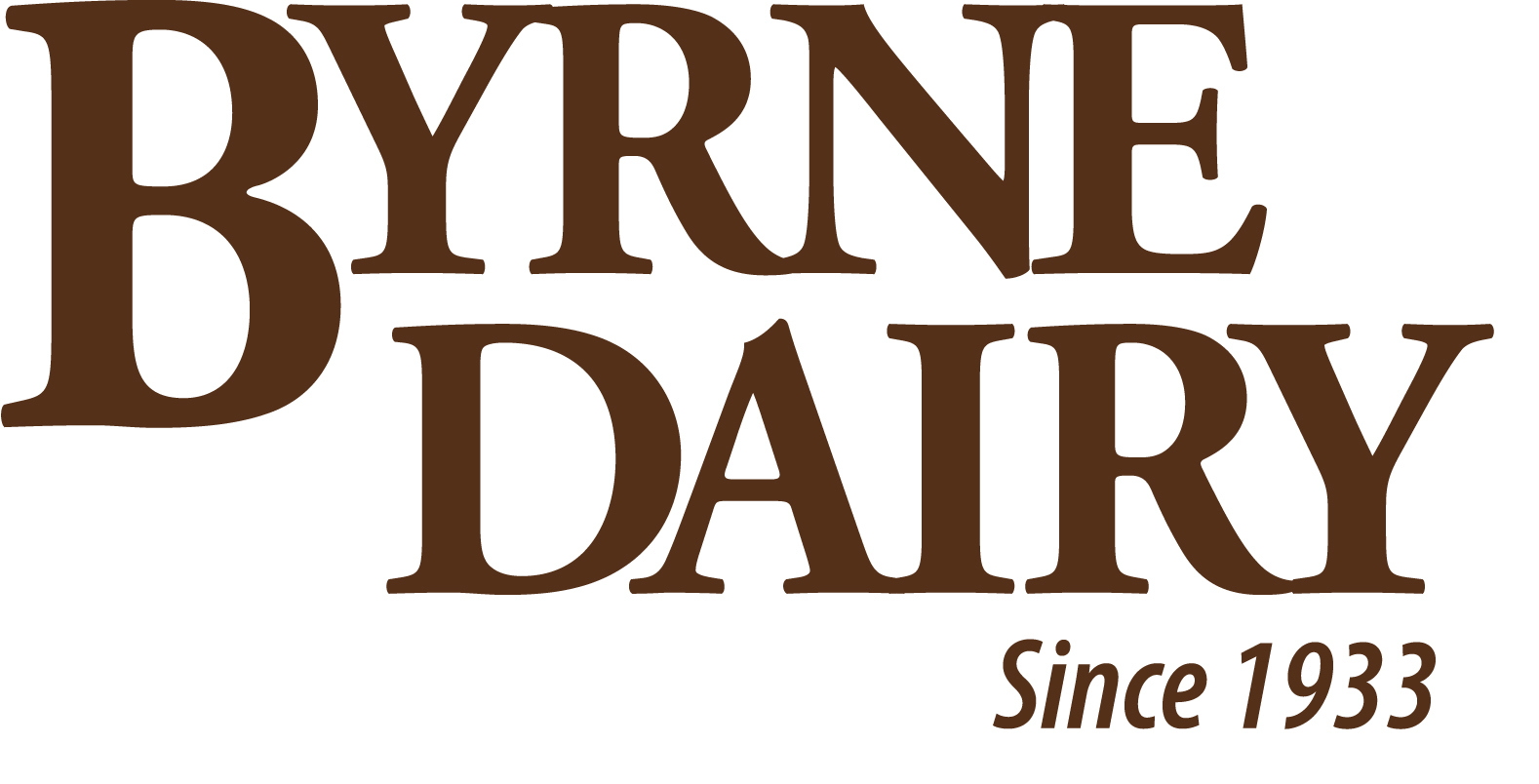
- Type: Privately Held
- Founded: 1933; 93 years ago
- Founder: Matthew V. Byrne
- Headquarters: Syracuse, New York, U.S.
- Number of locations: 63
- Revenue: ▲US$335.3 Million (2014)
- Website: byrnedairy.com

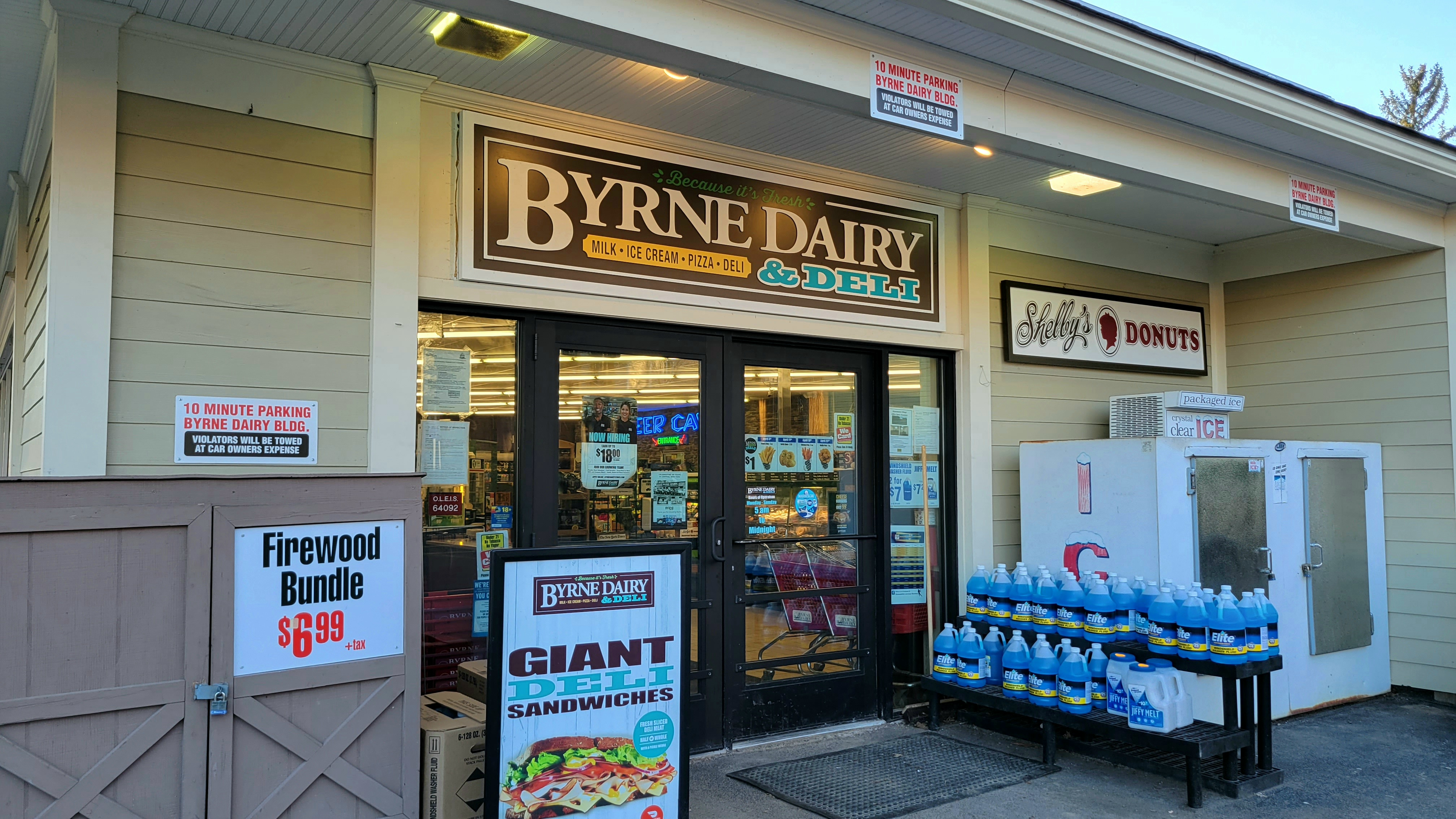
Byrne Dairy in Skaneateles, New York

Byrne Dairy is a regional dairy company headquartered in Syracuse, New York. It was founded during the Great Depression in 1933, delivering milk bottles to New Yorkers by horse-wagons. The company is privately run and has expanded, distributing across the Upstate New York region, supplying many wholesale and retail locations. The company also has a wholesale distribution center in Massachusetts and operates a chain of convenience store/gas stations in Central New York.

In October 2012, it announced a plan to open a yogurt plant and agritourism center on a 127-acre site in Cortlandville, New York. The announcement marks Byrne Dairy's entry into the expanding central New York Greek yogurt belt, alongside Chobani, Crowley Foods, as well as Fage's presence in Johnstown.

In 2024, Byrne Dairy, with other companies, produced aseptic milk, which has a shelf life of 13 months.

== See also ==
- Turkey Hill Dairy
- Wawa (company)
