= Conestoga Township, Pennsylvania =

Township in Pennsylvania, US

Coordinates: 39°56′00″N 76°21′00″W

Conestoga Township, Pennsylvania Kanneschtooge (Pennsylvania German)
- Township
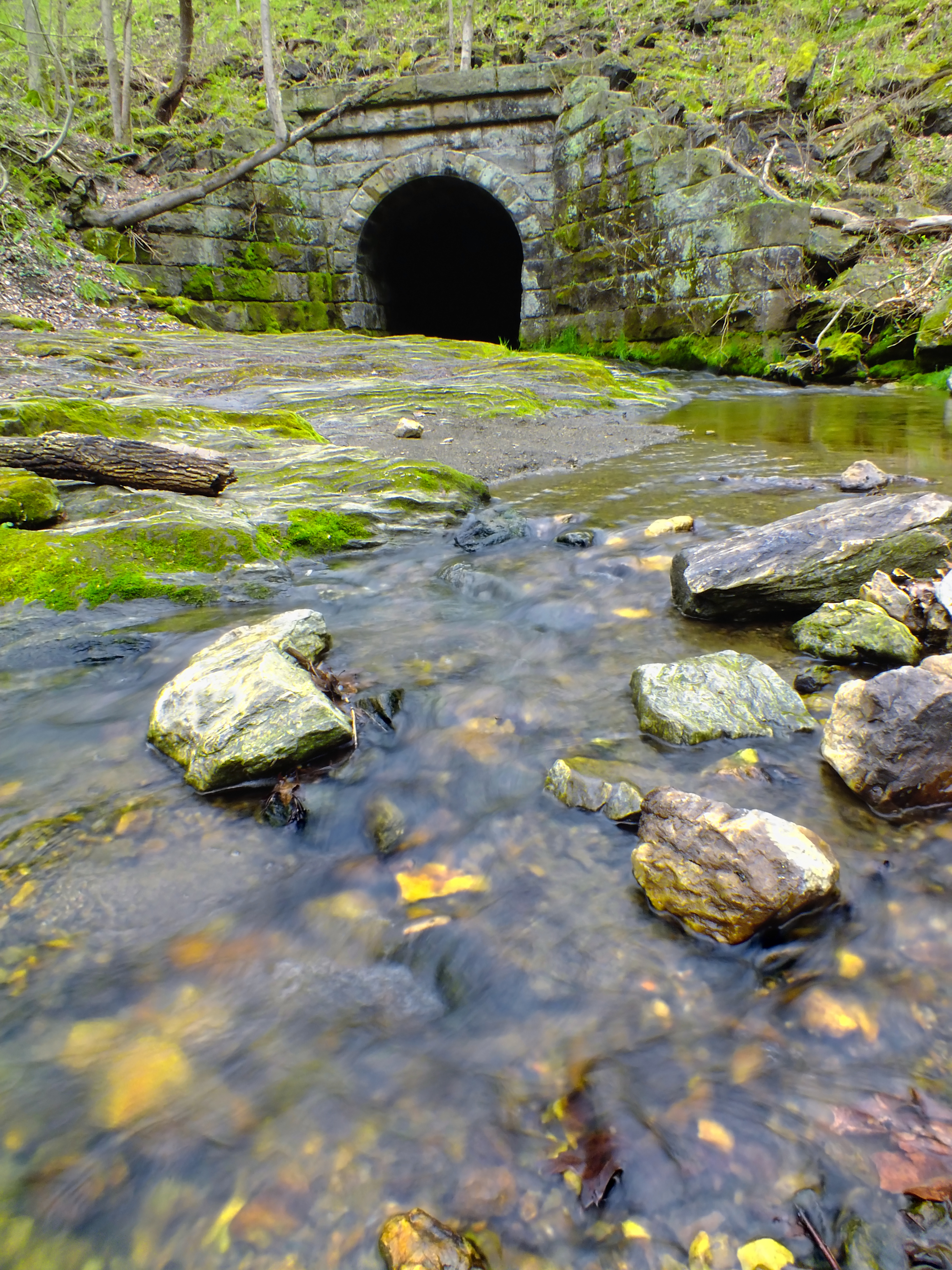
- Shenks Ferry Wildflower Preserve in the township

- Logo

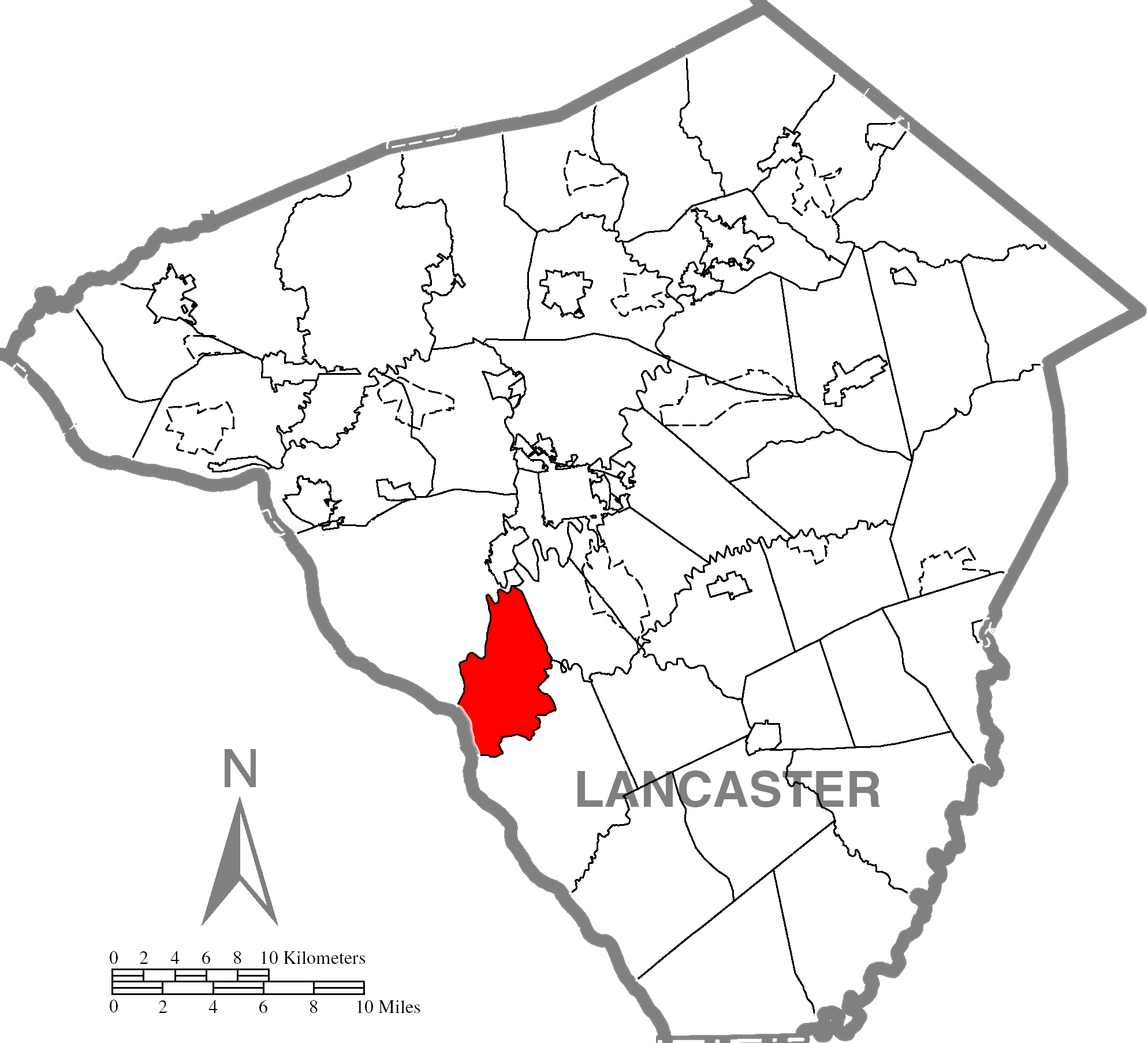
- Map of Lancaster County, Pennsylvania highlighting Conestoga Township

- Location of Conestoga Township in Lancaster County, Pennsylvania
- Country: United States
- State: Pennsylvania
- County: Lancaster
- Settled: 1759
- Incorporated: 1712

Government
  - Type: Board of Supervisors
  - Chairman: Matthew Connelly
  - Vice Chairman: Joe Devoy
  - Member: John Berry

Area
  - Total: 16.58 sq mi (42.93 km^{2})
  - Land: 14.64 sq mi (37.91 km^{2})
  - Water: 1.94 sq mi (5.02 km^{2})

Population (2020)
  - Total: 3,922
  - Estimate (2021): 3,914
  - Density: 263.3/sq mi (101.65/km^{2})
- Time zone: UTC-5 (Eastern (EST))
  - Summer (DST): UTC-4 (EDT)
- Area code: 717
- FIPS code: 42-071-15592
- Website: conestogatwp.com

Conestoga Township (Pennsylvania German: Kanneschtooge) is a township in west central Lancaster County, Pennsylvania. At the 2020 census, the population was 3,922.

== History ==
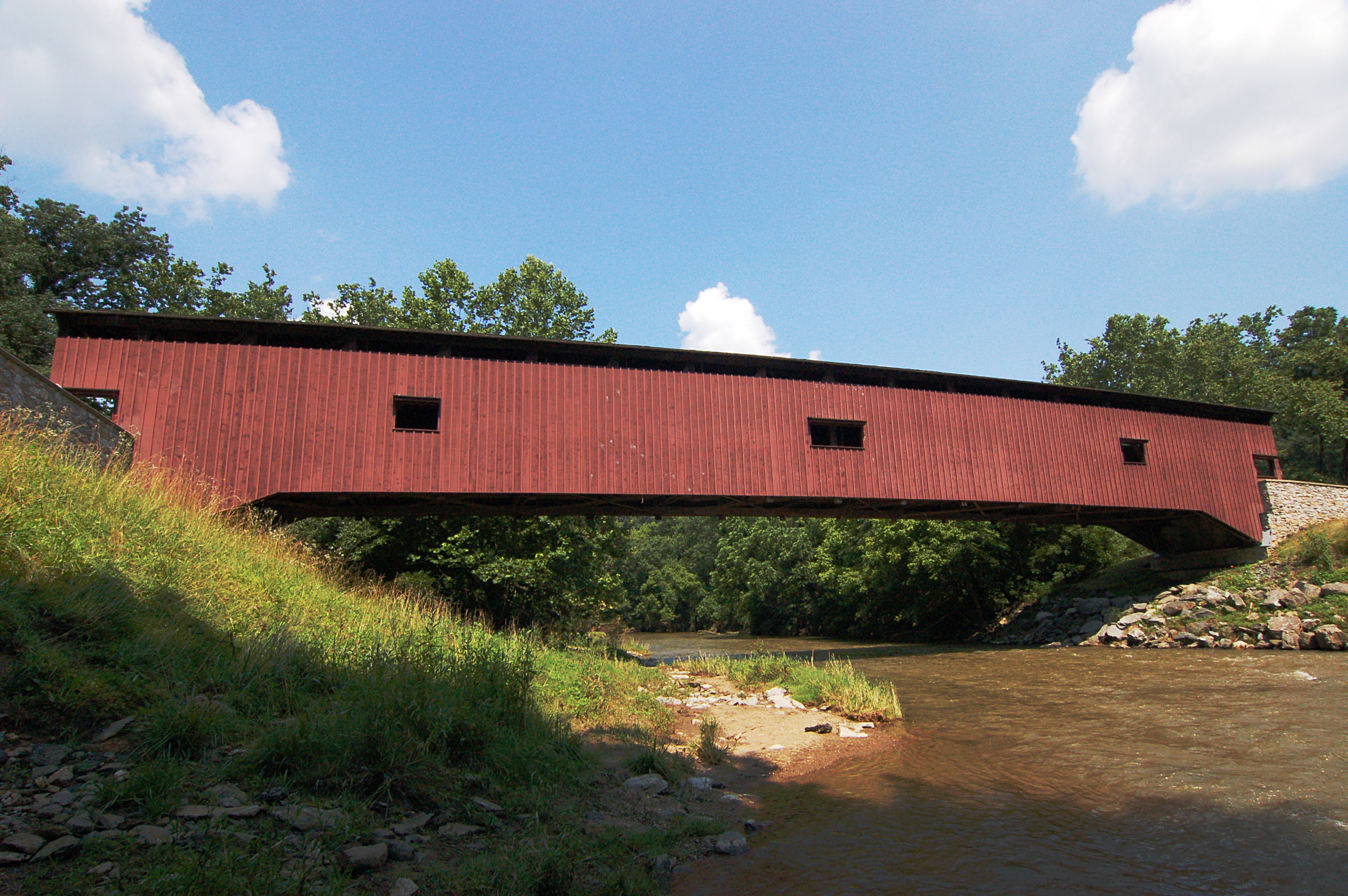
Colemanville Covered Bridge in Conestoga Township

Conestoga Township was formed in 1712 as part of Chester County. Lancaster County was not formed until 1729. Pequea Township was formed from Conestoga Township.

Conestoga wagons are named for the township; it cannot be proven that the first such wagons were built in the township, but at least some were.

The Colemanville Covered Bridge and Big and Little Indian Rock Petroglyphs are listed on the National Register of Historic Places.

== Geography ==
According to the U.S. Census Bureau, the township has a total area of 16.4 square miles (42 km^{2}), of which 14.6 square miles (38 km^{2}) is land and 1.8 square miles (4.7 km^{2}) (11.02%) is water. It includes the communities of Slackwater, Rockhill, Stone Hill, Conestoga, Safe Harbor, and Colemanville.

== Demographics ==
Historical population
Census	Pop.	Note	%±
1980	3,032		—
1990	3,470		14.4%
2000	3,749		8.0%
2010	3,776		0.7%
2020	3,922		3.9%
2021 (est.)	3,914		−0.2%
U.S. Decennial Census

At the 2000 census, there were 3,749 people, 1,374 households, and 1,067 families living in the township. The population density was 256.3 people per square mile (99.0 people/km^{2}). There were 1,409 housing units at an average density of 96.3 units per square mile (37.2 units/km^{2}). The racial makeup of the township was 98.32% White, 0.32% Black or African American, 0.13% Native American, 0.16% Asian, 0.21% Pacific Islander, 0.13% from other races, and 0.72% from two or more races. 0.99% of the population were Hispanic or Latino of any race. There were 1,374 households, 36.0% had children under the age of 18 living with them, 66.2% were married couples living together, 7.5% had a female householder with no husband present, and 22.3% were non-families. 17.3% of households were made up of individuals, and 5.7% were one person aged 65 or older. The average household size was 2.73 and the average family size was 3.10.

The age distribution was 26.9% under the age of 18, 7.4% from 18 to 24, 29.5% from 25 to 44, 26.3% from 45 to 64, and 9.9% 65 or older. The median age was 38 years. For every 100 females, there were 101.9 males. For every 100 females age 18 and over, there were 102.0 males.

The median household income was $51,895 and the median family income was $57,768. Males had a median income of $37,284 versus $25,956 for females. The per capita income for the township was $21,939. About 2.2% of families and 3.5% of the population were below the poverty line, including 2.2% of those under age 18 and 2.9% of those age 65 or over.
