= Big and Little Indian Rock Petroglyphs =

- U.S. National Register of Historic Places
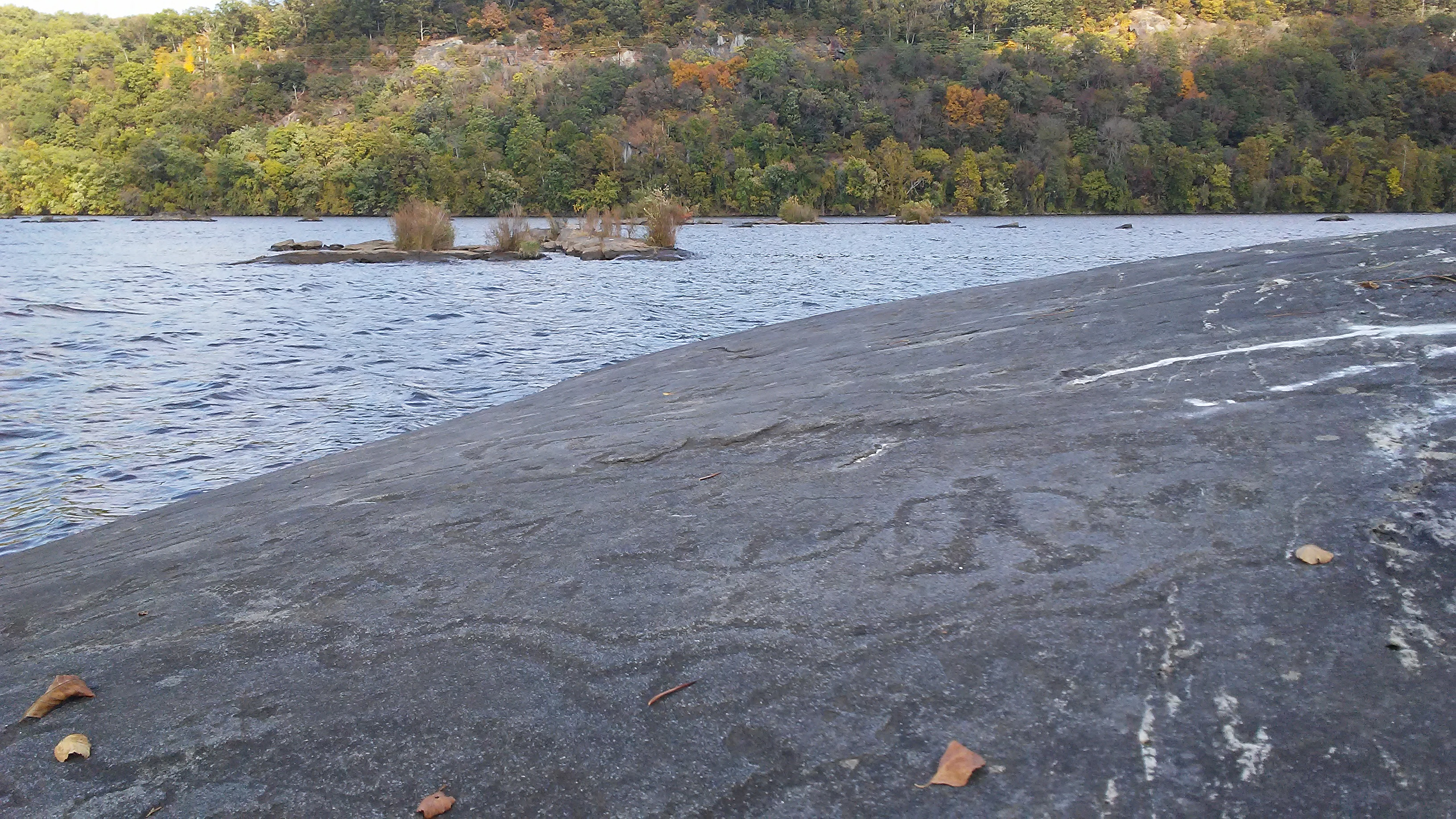

- Location within Pennsylvania Location within the United States
- Location: In the Susquehanna River, south of Safe Harbor, Conestoga Township, Pennsylvania
- Coordinates: 39°55′15″N 76°23′05″W
- Area: 1 acre (0.40 ha)
- NRHP reference No.: 78002421
- Added to NRHP: April 3, 1978

Big and Little Indian Rock Petroglyphs is a prehistoric archaeological site located at Conestoga Township in Lancaster County, Pennsylvania. It consists of two large rocks located in the Susquehanna River. Big Indian Rock is 60 feet by 40 feet, and has carvings on all sides. The Little Indian Rock measures 38 feet by 32 feet and has carvings on the north side. The petroglyphs were first studied in 1934, and are believed to be by an Algonquian tribe.

It was listed on the National Register of Historic Places in 1978.
