= West Side Sanitarium =

- U.S. National Register of Historic Places
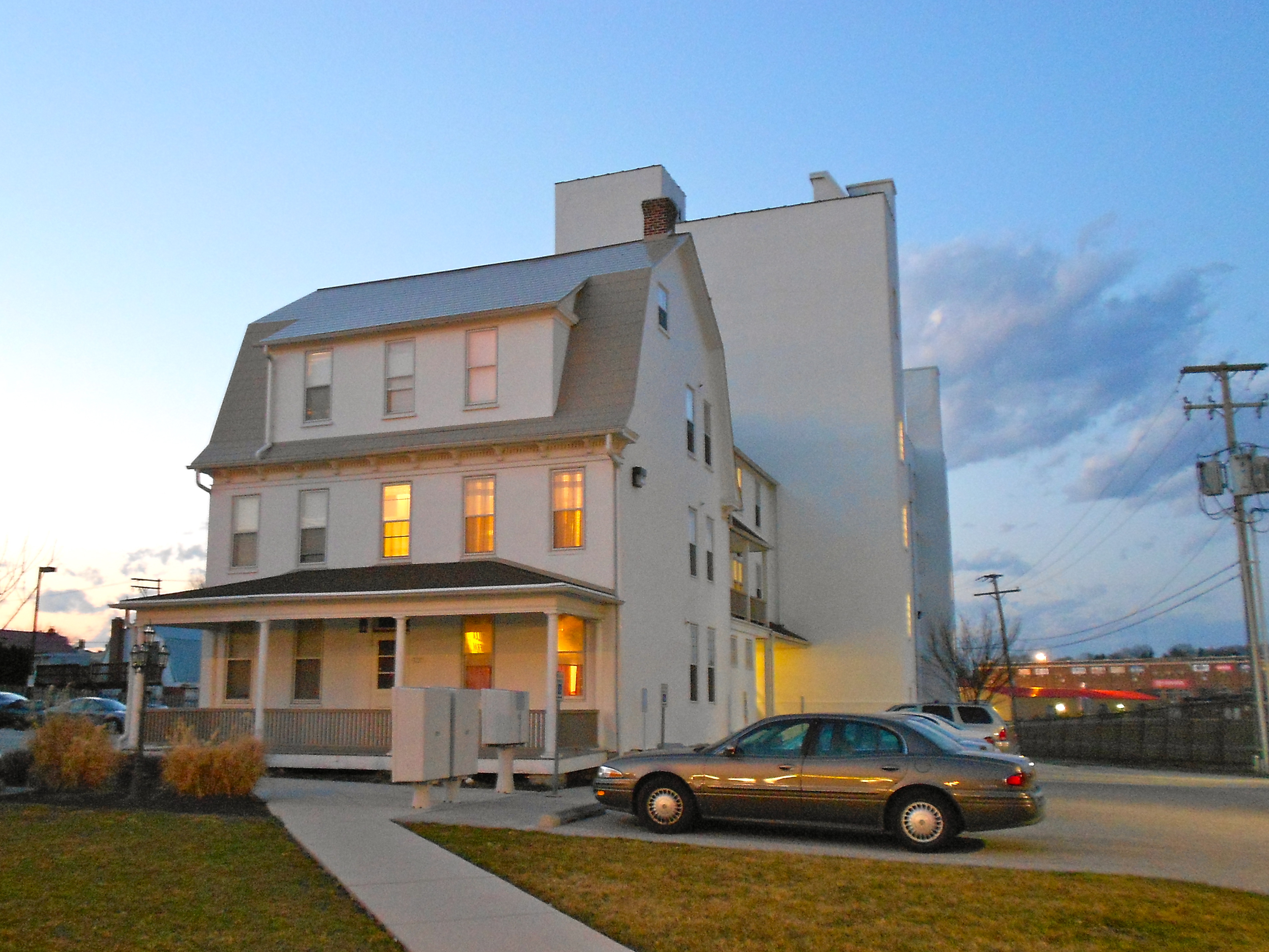
- West Side Sanitarium in February, 2012

- Location within Pennsylvania Location within the United States
- Location: 1253-1261 West Market St., West York, Pennsylvania
- Coordinates: 39°57′14″N 76°45′24″W
- Area: 1.5 acres (0.61 ha)
- Architect: Leber, Edward
- Architectural style: Dutch Colonial Revival, Queen Anne
- NRHP reference No.: 04000400
- Added to NRHP: May 5, 2004

West Side Sanitarium, also known as West Side Osteopathic Hospital, is a historic sanitarium complex located at West York, York County, Pennsylvania. The complex consists of four buildings: two large medical buildings and two residences. The Sanitarium was originally built as a hotel in 1905, and doubled in size in 1924, with an addition and rear ell. It is a 3 1/2-story, Dutch Colonial Revival-style brick-and-frame building with a gambrel roof. It measures approximately 110 feet wide and 31 feet deep. The Nurses' Home and Sanitarium Annex was built in 1924, also in the Dutch Colonial Revival-style. It is a 3 1/2-story, 28-foot-wide by 30-foot-deep, frame building, expanded in 1931, with a 4-story rear addition measuring 25 feet wide by 34 feet deep. It features a one-story full-width porch with Tuscan order columns. The Doctors' Home and Dr. Meisenhelder's Home and Office were built in 1905, and are in a vernacular Queen Anne style. They are 2 1/2 stories tall with cross-gabled, slate-covered roofs and each measure about 20 feet wide by 40 feet deep. Three of the four buildings are connected via tunnels. The hospital remained in operation until 1962, after which the buildings housed a business college then home to the Aquarian Church of Universal Service.

It was added to the National Register of Historic Places in 2004.
