= Ashley and Bailey Silk Mill =

- U.S. National Register of Historic Places
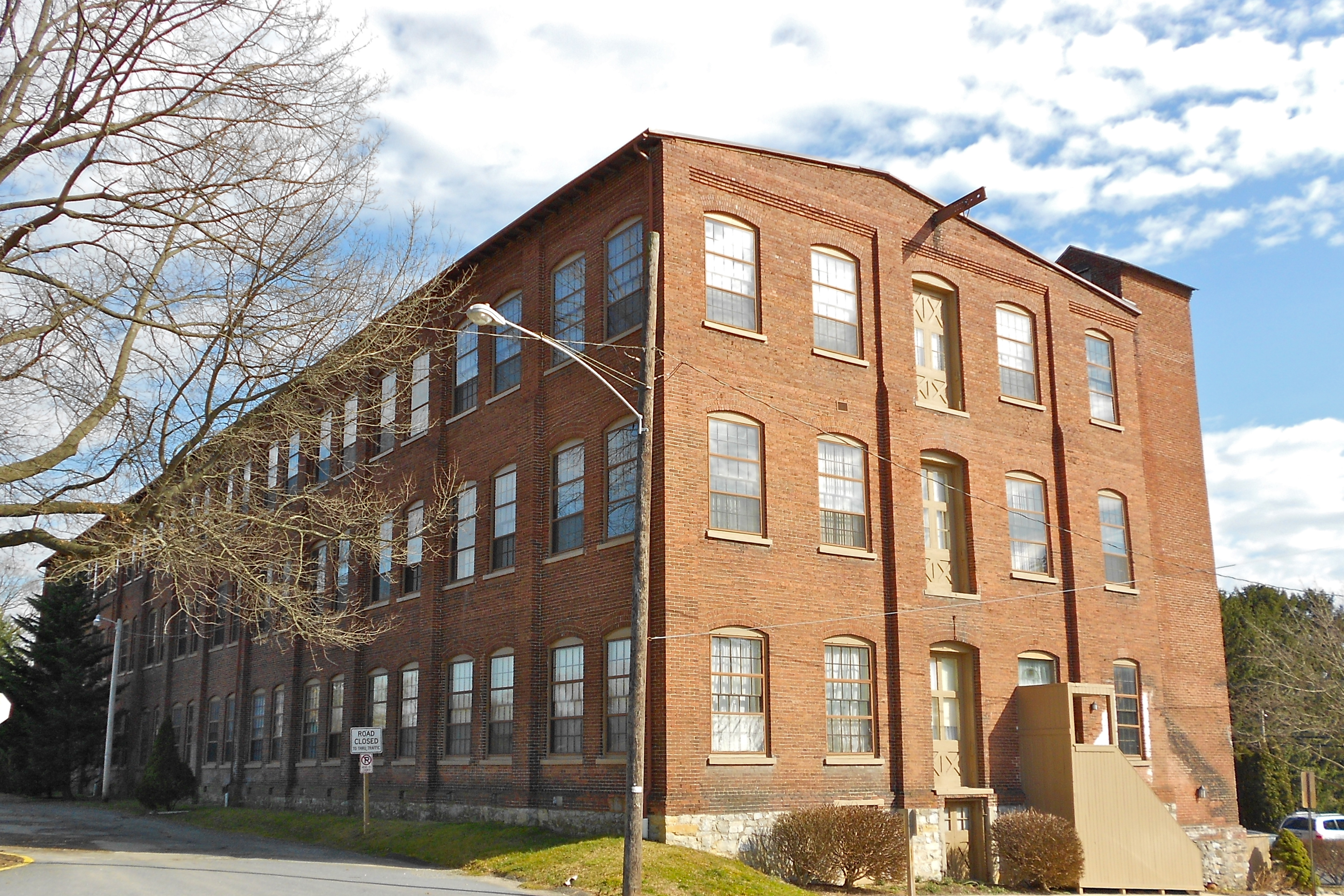
- Ashley and Bailey Silk Mill, February 2012

- Location within Pennsylvania Location within the United States
- Location: E. Walnut and Pine Sts., Marietta, Pennsylvania
- Coordinates: 40°3′33″N 76°32′51″W
- Area: 1.1 acres (0.45 ha)
- Built: 1897
- NRHP reference No.: 80003533
- Added to NRHP: June 27, 1980

The Ashley and Bailey Silk Mill is an historic silk mill which is located in Marietta, Lancaster County, Pennsylvania. It was listed on the National Register of Historic Places in 1980.

It should not be confused with the Ashley and Bailey Company Silk Mill, which is located about eighteen miles west in West York, Pennsylvania.

== History and architectural features ==
Built in 1897, this historic building is a three-story brick factory structure which was erected atop a limestone foundation. It is thirteen bays long and has a low-pitched gable roof.

It was listed on the National Register of Historic Places in 1980. It should not be confused with the Ashley and Bailey Company Silk Mill, which was constructed in a similar style of similar material and is also listed on the NRHP. It is located about eighteen miles west in West York, Pennsylvania.

Currently, the structure is used as a condominium building.

== Gallery ==
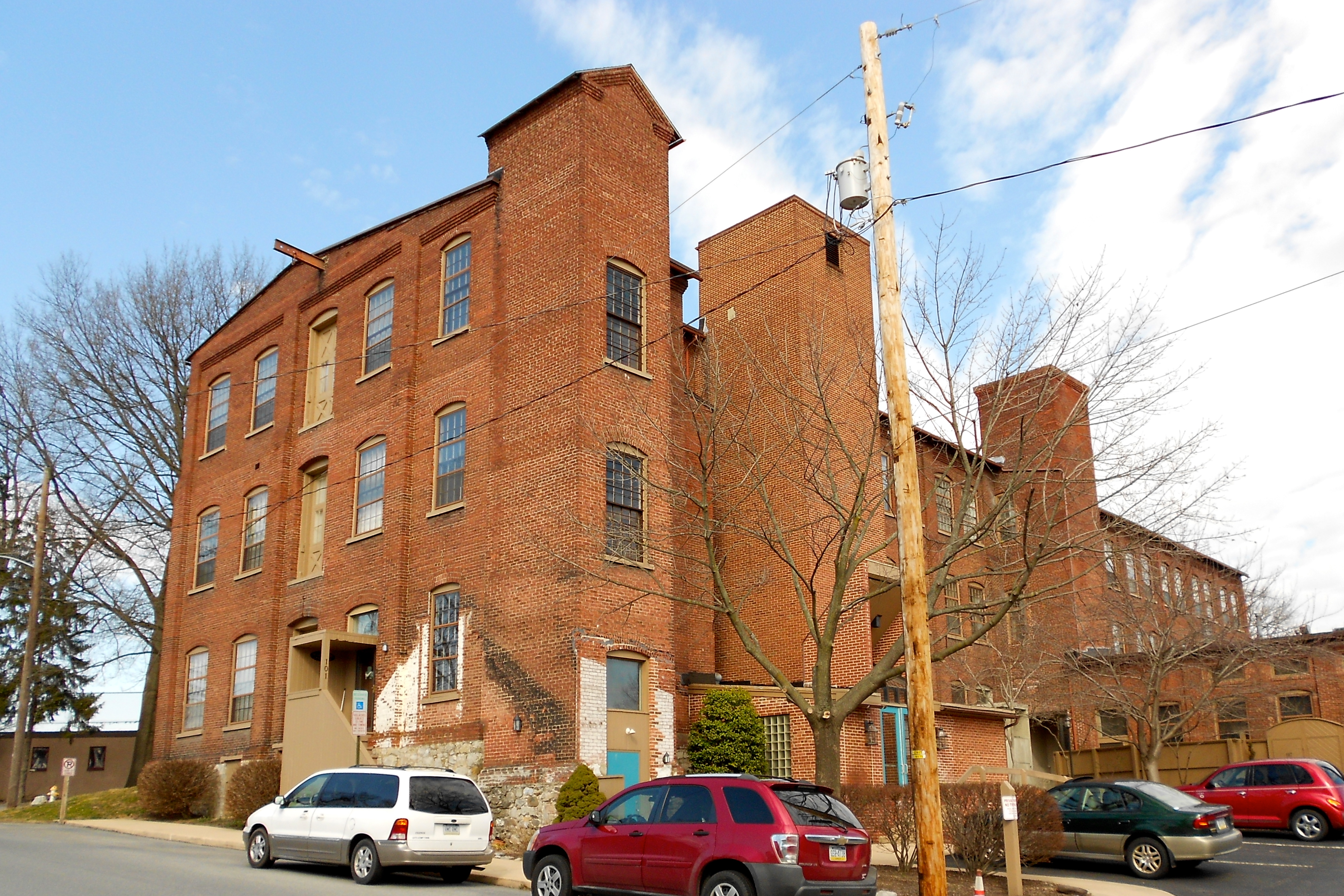
View from the southwest
