= Ashley and Bailey Company Silk Mill =

- U.S. National Register of Historic Places
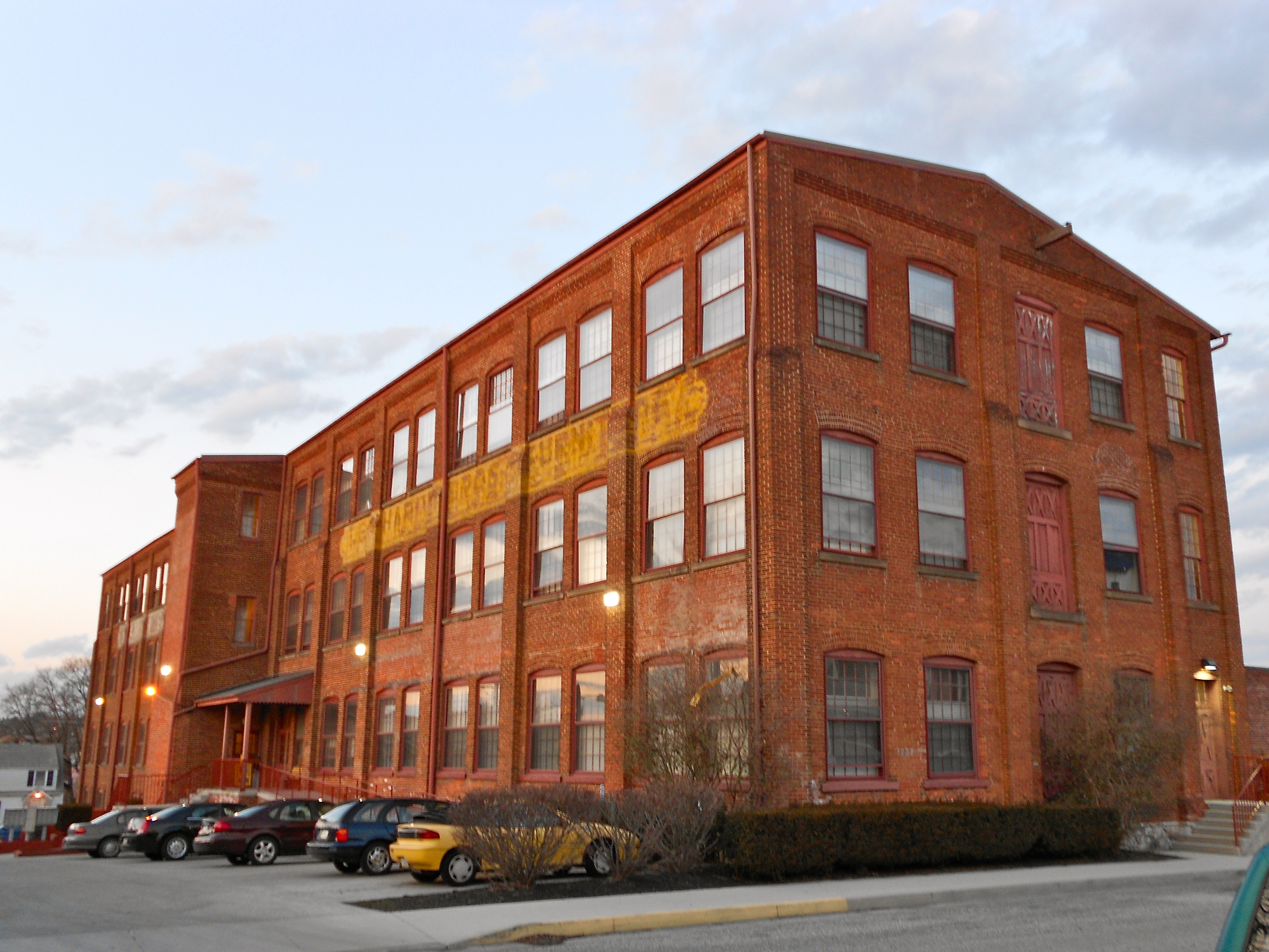

- Location within Pennsylvania Location within the United States
- Location: 1237 W. Princess St., West York, Pennsylvania
- Coordinates: 39°57′7″N 76°45′3″W
- Area: less than one acre
- Built: c. 1899
- Architectural style: Late 19th And Early 20th Century American Movements, Vernacular Industrial
- NRHP reference No.: 91000090
- Added to NRHP: February 21, 1991

The Ashley and Bailey Company Silk Mill, also known as the Franklin Silk Mill and Leinhardt Brothers Furniture Warehouse, is an historic silk mill which is located in West York, York County, Pennsylvania. It was added to the National Register of Historic Places (NRHP) in 1991 as an example of vernacular industrial architecture.

Another Ashley and Bailey Silk Mill is located about eighteen miles east in Marietta, Pennsylvania. Built about two years before the West York mill, it was similarly constructed and has also been listed on the NRHP.

== History and architectural features ==
Built circa 1899, this historic factory building is a three-story, brick structure that was erected atop a rough-cut stone foundation. It has a shallow gable roof, a three-story L-shaped tower, and a broad one-story ell. Also located on the property is a small, flat-roofed brick building that was built circa 1925.

The mill closed in 1937. The building was used as a furniture warehouse into the 1980s.

It was added to the National Register of Historic Places (NRHP) in 1991 as an example of vernacular industrial architecture.

Another Ashley and Bailey Silk Mill is located about eighteen miles east in Marietta, Pennsylvania. Built about two years before the West York mill, it was similarly constructed and has also been listed on the NRHP.
