= West York, Pennsylvania =

Borough in Pennsylvania, US

- Borough
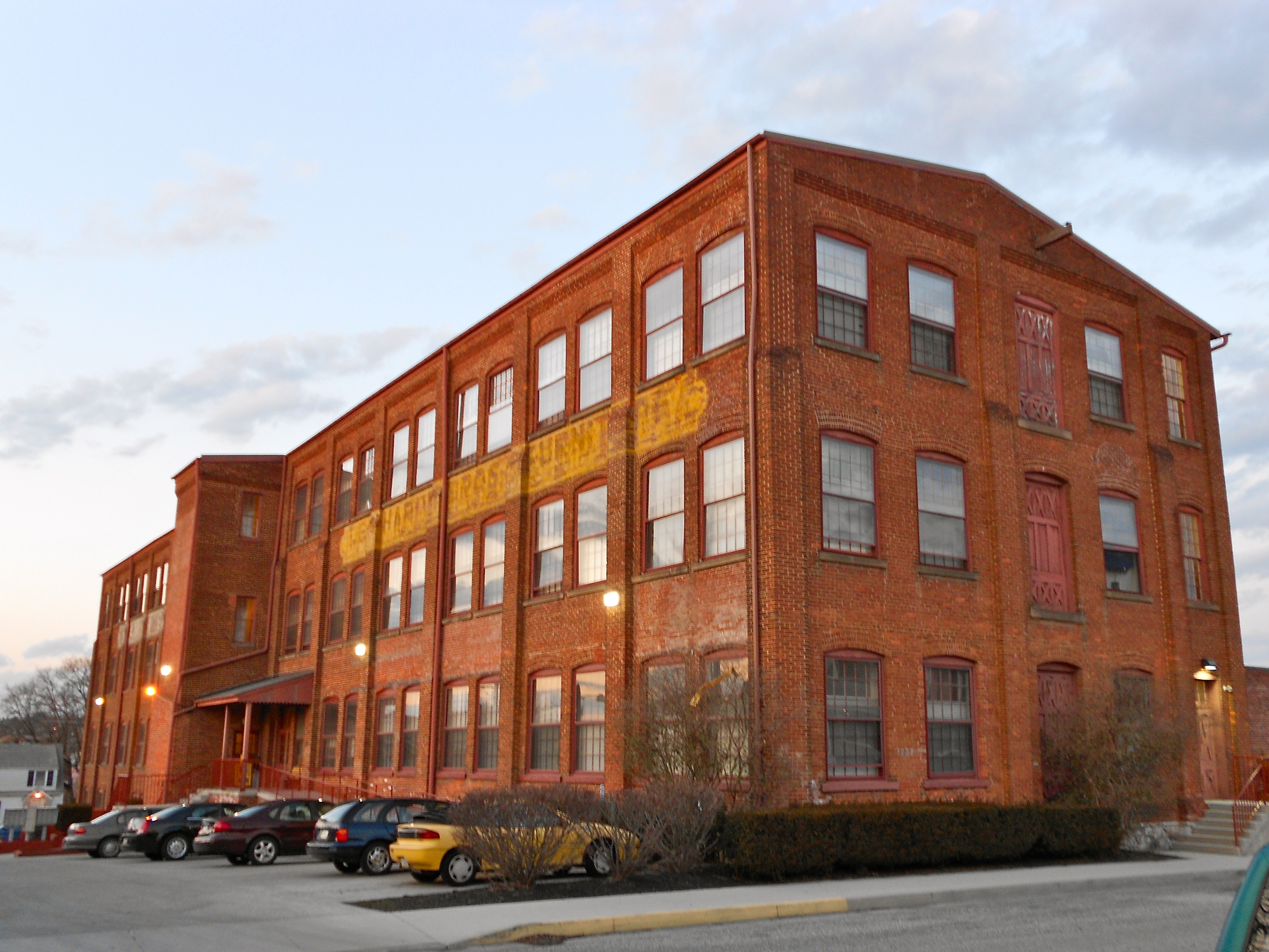
- The Ashley and Bailey Company Silk Mill

- Location in York County and the U.S. state of Pennsylvania.

- Location of West York in Pennsylvania West York (the United States)
- Coordinates: 39°57′11″N 76°45′36″W
- Country: United States
- State: Pennsylvania
- County: York
- Incorporated: 1904

Government
  - Type: Borough Council
  - Mayor: Bruce Vick

Area
  - Total: 0.53 sq mi (1.36 km^{2})
  - Land: 0.53 sq mi (1.36 km^{2})
  - Water: 0 sq mi (0.00 km^{2})
- Elevation: 404 ft (123 m)

Population (2020)
  - Total: 5,094 ▲
  - Estimate (2021): 5,079
  - Density: 8,703.8/sq mi (3,360.55/km^{2})
- Time zone: UTC-5 (Eastern (EST))
  - Summer (DST): UTC-4 (EDT)
- Zip code: 17404
- Area code: 717
- FIPS code: 42-84288
- Website: westyorkpa.gov

West York is a borough, adjacent to the City of York, in York County, Pennsylvania, United States. The population was 5,094 at the 2020 census.

== History ==
Formally known as the village of Eberton, the Borough of West York was founded in 1904.

The Ashley and Bailey Company Silk Mill, William Shelly School and Annex, and West Side Sanitarium are listed on the National Register of Historic Places.

== Geography ==
West York is located at 39°57′11″N 76°45′36″W (39.953148, −76.759921).

According to the United States Census Bureau, the borough has a total area of 0.6 square miles (1.6 km^{2}), all land.

== Government ==
West York Borough's municipal government is composed of elected positions: Mayor Bruce Vick and seven borough council members. The Borough's Chief Administrator is former mayor Shawn Mauck. Mauck is the democratic mayor that ousted Charles Wasco. Mauck rallied council to censure Wasco.

Former mayor Charles Wasko attracted national notoriety in September 2016 for his racist Facebook posts depicting President Barack Obama and First Lady Michelle Obama as orangutans and displaying a photo of a noose. Wasko also insulted Muslims and African Americans.

The West York borough council voted to censure Wasko, but had no power to throw him out of office. On October 18, 2016, it voted unanimously to accept his resignation.

== Police department ==
The West York Borough Police Department (WYBPD), founded in 1917, is a full-time and full-service municipal law enforcement agency that provides 24-hour patrol, emergency response, and investigative functions within the confines of the Borough of West York. The ranking structure of the WYBPD is chief of police, sergeant, and patrolman. The WYBPD currently consists of 15 sworn police officers, and maintains a full-time patrol division, criminal investigative division, and special operations K-9 unit. The department uses Ford Interceptors and Ford Tauruses for patrol vehicles. The WYBPD also uses police-equipped mountain bicycles.

In 2013, the WYBPD completed a large-scale organized-crime investigation involving over 196 suspects engaged in felonious crimes in five Pennsylvania and two Maryland counties. The alleged ring leader was operating his criminal enterprise from a small storefront shop located along W. Market Street. This crime ring targeted over 90 retail chain stores in over 300 locations throughout this seven-county and multistate geographic area.

Per the crime statistics as compiled by the Pennsylvania State Police in 2019, the Borough of West York had the second-highest high crime rate per area in York County, yet their primary patrol duties are still traffic and parking enforcement.

== Fire department and EMS ==
Fire protection for the borough is provided by the West York Fire Department (WYFD), which is administered by the borough and staffed by borough-paid fire Drivers. The drivers operate the borough-owned apparatus, which consists of one E-One ladder truck and one E-One engine. The drivers are also cross-trained as a codes-enforcement officers and inspect and enforce the borough's building and housing codes. They also inspect and issue occupancy licenses for all rental units and businesses. The paid drivers are members of the International Brotherhood of Teamsters and are represented by Local 776.

The Reliance Fire Company, established in 1904, is a separate entity, which is an all-volunteer fire company. The volunteer firefighters ride on and use the borough-owned apparatus, but they are not permitted to operate the equipment. The fire company owns and operates one Ford F250 (RITT) utility truck and one Chevrolet Tahoe as the duty-officer vehicle. The WYFD and Reliance Fire Company operate from the same facility.

EMS coverage in West York is provided by First Capital EMS Station 5–1, formerly known as West York Ambulance before its merger with York Regional EMS and Grantley Fire & EMS

== Demographics ==
Historical population
Census	Pop.	Note	%±
1910	2,435		—
1920	3,320		36.3%
1930	5,381		62.1%
1940	5,590		3.9%
1950	5,756		3.0%
1960	5,526		−4.0%
1970	5,314		−3.8%
1980	4,526		−14.8%
1990	4,283		−5.4%
2000	4,321		0.9%
2010	4,617		6.9%
2020	5,094		10.3%
2021 (est.)	5,079	▼	−0.3%

As of the census of 2000, 4,321 people, 1,897 households, and 1,088 families resided in the borough. The population density was 8,759.7 inhabitants per square mile (3,382.1/km^{2}). The 2,010 housing units averaged 4,074.8 per square mile (1,583.8/km^{2}). The racial makeup of the borough was 93.75% White, 2.80% African American, 0.30% Native American, 0.16% Asian, 1.37% from other races, and 1.62% from two or more races. Hispanics or Latinos of any race were 2.96% of the population.

Of the 1,897 households, 30.0% had children under the age of 18 living with them, 38.4% were married couples living together, 13.8% had a female householder with no husband present, and 42.6% were not families. About 35.3% of all households were made up of individuals, and 13.8% had someone living alone who was 65 years of age or older. The average household size was 2.28 and the average family size was 2.96.

In the borough, the population was distributed as 25.2% under the age of 18, 8.0% from 18 to 24, 34.6% from 25 to 44, 18.3% from 45 to 64, and 13.8% who were 65 years of age or older. The median age was 35 years. For every 100 females, there were 87.9 males. For every 100 women age 18 and over, there were 84.7 men.

The median income for a household in the borough was $34,604, and for a family was $41,574. Males had a median income of $30,734 versus $22,338 for females. The per capita income for the borough was $17,503. About 5.0% of families and 6.0% of the population were below the poverty line, including 6.9% of those under age 18 and 4.8% of those age 65 or over.

== Education ==
The Borough of West York and West Manchester Township are both served by the West York Area School District. The mascot for the school district is the Bulldog and the athletic teams are commonly called the "Bulldogs".

Grace E. Loucks Elementary School was the only remaining active school building within the borough until it closed in June 2015. Elementary-school students now attend nearby Wallace, Lincolnway, or Trimmer Schools.
