= Pennsylvania House of Representatives, District 94 =

American legislative district

Pennsylvania's 94th State House of Representatives district
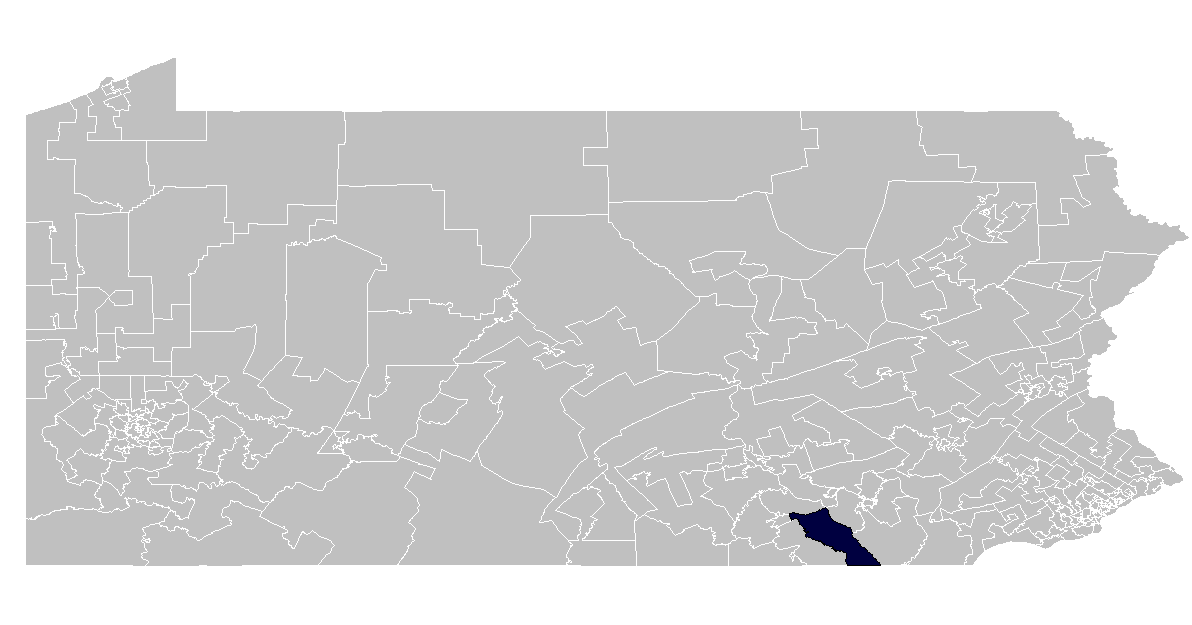
Representative
Wendy Fink; R–Red Lion
- Population (2022): 63,281

The 94th Pennsylvania House of Representatives District is located in South Central Pennsylvania and has been represented by Wendy Fink since 2023.

== District profile ==
The 94th District is located in York County and includes the following areas:

- Chanceford Township
- Delta
- East Prospect
- Felton
- Lower Chanceford Township
- Lower Windsor Township
- Peach Bottom Township
- Red Lion
- Springettsbury Township (part)
  - District 01
  - District 04
  - District 05
  - District 06
  - District 08
- Windsor
- Windsor Township
- Yorkana

== Representatives ==
Representative	Party	Years	District home	Note
Prior to 1969, seats were apportioned by county.
John Hope Anderson	Republican	1969–1982		
Gregory Snyder	Republican	1983–1992		
Stan Saylor	Republican	1993–2023	Red Lion	
Wendy Fink	Republican	2023–present	Red Lion	Incumbent

== Bibliography ==
- Cox, Harold (2004). "Legislatures – 1776–2004". Wilkes University Election Statistics Project. Wilkes University.
