= Stan Saylor =

American politician

Stanley E. Saylor
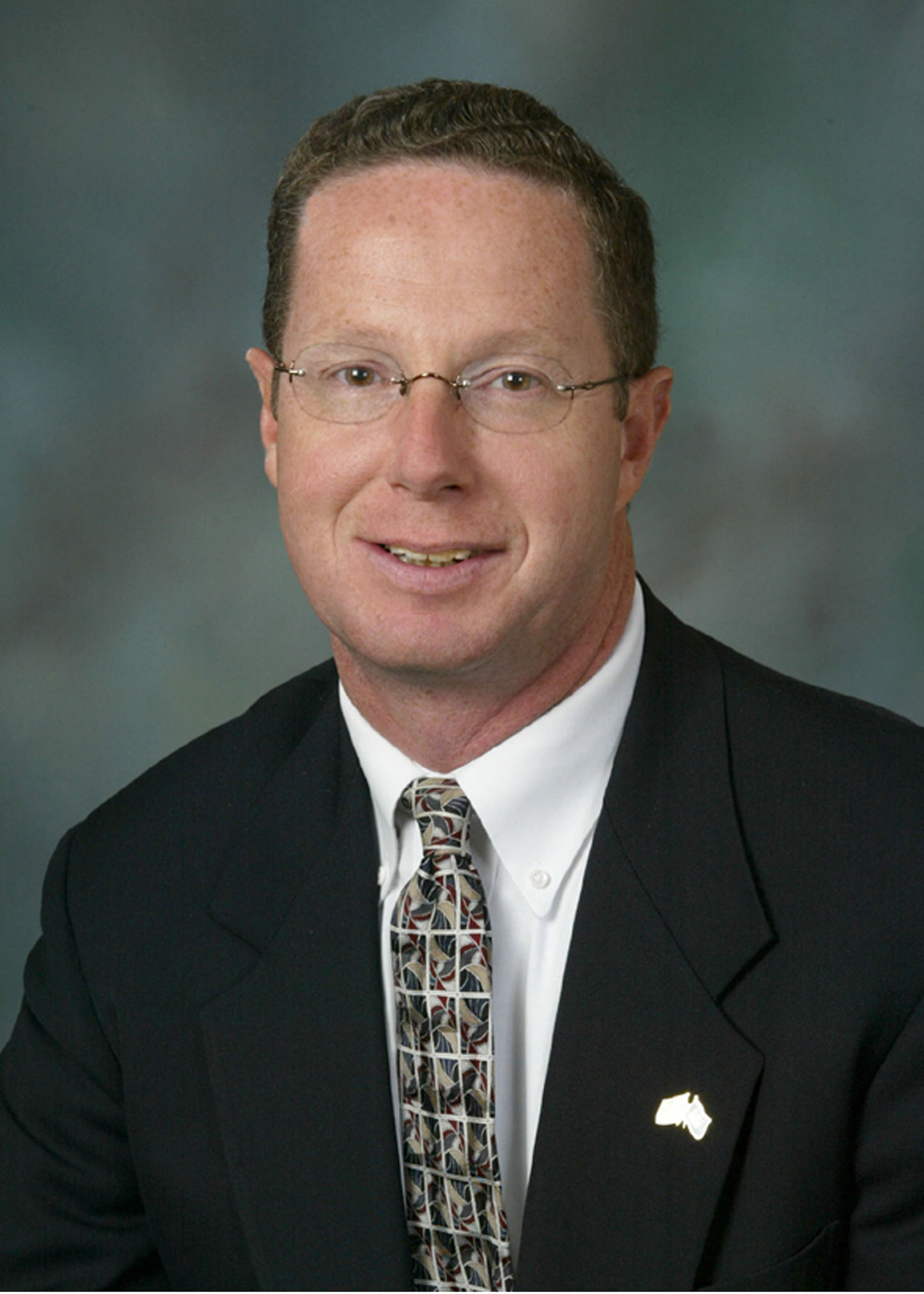

Member of the Pennsylvania House of Representatives from the 94th district
- In office January 5, 1993 – November 30, 2022
- Preceded by: Gregory Snyder
- Succeeded by: Wendy Fink

Republican Whip of the Pennsylvania House of Representatives
- In office January 4, 2011 – January 6, 2015
- Preceded by: Mike Turzai
- Succeeded by: Bryan Cutler

Personal details
- Born: March 3, 1955 (age 71) York, Pennsylvania
- Party: Republican
- Education: Indiana University
- Website: www.repsaylor.com

Stanley E. "Stan" Saylor (born March 3, 1953) is a Republican former member of the Pennsylvania House of Representatives for the 94th District and was first elected in 1992. After the 2008 election, Saylor was elected the Republican Policy Committee Chairman. Following the 2010 election, he was elected Republican Whip and served in that role until 2015. He is also on the House Rules Committee. After his reelection in 2016, Saylor was named Chairman of the House Appropriations Committee. Saylor was defeated by Wendy Fink in the 2022 Republican primary election.

== Election results ==
The 94th District from which Saylor is elected includes residents of Chanceford, Lower Chanceford, Lower Windsor, Peach Bottom, and Windsor Townships in the southeast portion of York County, their surrounded and adjacent boroughs, and five (the southernmost) of Springettsbury Township's eight local districts. He was unopposed in his reelection bids from 2000 until 2006, when Democrat Maxine Kuntz also ran for the seat; Saylor won with 73.5% of the vote. The results were very similar in 2008, when Democrat Deb Tillman received 26.8% of the vote to Saylor's 73.2%. Likewise in 2010, Democratic candidate Metta Barbour took 28.2% while Saylor had 71.8% voting for him. After no opposition in 2012, district voters gave Democrat David Colon 27.7% in 2014, to Saylor's 72.3%. Saylor had no challenger in 2016. In 2018, Democrat Stephen Snell received 33.6% of the vote, to Saylor's 66.4%. Saylor had no challenger again in 2020.

In 2022, Saylor was challenged in the Republican primary by Wendy Fink who ran an anti-establishment campaign. Fink defeated Saylor 55.7% to 44.3%.

== Political positions ==
Saylor believes that legalizing adult-use cannabis in Pennsylvania is a "terrible idea", citing the federal legal status and calling it a "highly addictive drug".

== Personal ==
Saylor graduated from Dallastown Area High School and majored in political science at Indiana University of Pennsylvania. He resides in Windsor Township, Pennsylvania.
