= Red Lion Area School District =

Public school system in York, Pennsylvania

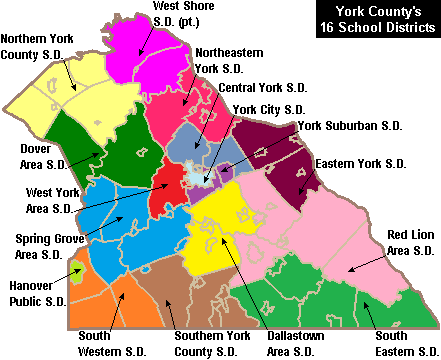

Address
- 696 Delta Road Red Lion, York County, Pennsylvania, 17356-9185; United States

District information
- Type: Public school district
- Grades: K-12

Other information
- Website: www.rlasd.net

The Red Lion Area School District is a large, suburban/rural, public school district located in southeastern York County, Pennsylvania, that serves the boroughs of Felton, Red Lion, Windsor, and Winterstown; and the townships of Chanceford Township, Lower Chanceford Township, North Hopewell Township, and Windsor Township. It encompasses approximately 140 square miles (360 km^{2}).

According to 2000 federal census data, it served a resident population of 32,661 people. By 2010, the district's population grew to 38,310 people, with 10% being ages 5–17 years.

== History ==
In 2009, Red Lion Area School District residents' per capita income was $20,325, while the median family income was $51,051. In the Commonwealth, the median family income was $49,501 and the United States median family income was $49,445, in 2010.

== Schools ==
- Red Lion Area Senior High School
- Red Lion Area Junior High School
- Clearview Elementary School
- Mazie Gable Elementary School
- Locust Grove Elementary School
- Pleasant View Elementary School
- North Hopewell – Winterstown Elementary School
- Windsor Manor Elementary School (Only Teaches Kindergarten as of 2018)
- Larry J. Macaluso Elementary School

== Extracurriculars ==
Red Lion Area School District's students have access to a variety of clubs, activities and an extensive sports program.

=== Sports ===
The district funds:

Boys

- Baseball – AAAAAA
- Basketball- AAAAAA
- Bowling - AAAA
- Cross country – AAA
- Football – AAAAAA
- Golf – AAA
- Indoor track and field – AAAA
- Lacrosse – AAA
- Soccer – AAAA
- Swimming and diving – AAA
- Tennis – AAA
- Track and field – AAA
- Volleyball – AAA
- Wrestling – AAA

Girls

- Basketball – AAAAAA
- Bowling - AAAA
- Competitive spirit - AAA
- Cross country – AAA
- Indoor track and field AAAA
- Field hockey – AAA
- Lacrosse – AAA
- Soccer (fall) – AAAA
- Softball – AAAAAA
- Swimming and diving – AAA
- Girls' tennis – AAA
- Track and field – AAA
- Volleyball – AAAA
- Wrestling – AAAA

Unisex: Marching band

Junior high school sports

Boys

- Basketball
- Cross country
- Football
- Track and field
- Wrestling

Girls

- Basketball
- Cross country
- Field hockey
- Track and field
- Volleyball
- Wrestling

According to PIAA directory March 2023

== Notable alumni ==
- Lzzy Hale (born 1983), lead singer and rhythm guitarist for the band Halestorm
- Arejay Hale, younger brother of Lzzy Hale, drummer and backing vocalist for the band Halestorm
- Butch Wynegar (born 1956), major league baseball player

== School violence ==
Red Lion Area School District has seen two serious acts of school violence in its history:

On February 2, 2001, former teacher William Michael Stankewicz committed a machete attack on a kindergarten class at North Hopewell – Winterstown Elementary School that wounded 11 children, the principal, and two teachers.

On April 24, 2003, eighth-grade student James Sheets entered Red Lion Area Junior High School armed with his stepfather's pistols, and killed the school's principal, Dr. Eugene Segro, before killing himself.

== Incidents ==
Red Lion has had many tragic events plague its legacy.

The Car Crash: On February 1, 2023, around 7:20 pm, a student crashed into the Athletic Trainers room. When the police arrived on the scene, no injures had been sustained on the driver and there were no victims inside. While the accident had no effect in terms of day-to-day classes, many students speculated that the driver was under the influence of some form of psychedelics.

Sexual Misconduct of Mr. Keiser: Chad Keiser was found guilty in court after admitting to having a sexual relationship with a 17-year-old student. The student reported the incident in September 2019, claiming the "relationship" took place in the early fall of 2006. Even though Mr. Keiser was quoted by an anonymous peer as "...a young, inexperienced teacher at the time.." he committed the crime in his car about 2 to 3 times. Mr. Keiser was sentenced to four years of probation and registered as a legal Sex Offender.

Allegations of School Bus Sexual Misconduct Cover Ups: On February 1, 2024, a lawsuit was filed in the Middle District of Pennsylvania Court alleging that both the Red Lion School District and Clearview Elementary School Principal Michael Langan did not report sexual assault which was allegedly committed against a five year-old female student by a male student on a bus in October 2023 to ChildLine, as required for school principals to do under Pennsylvania state law. The lawsuit also accused the school district of not protecting the female student by not putting the two on different school buses after the assault, with the boy also later bruising the girl's arm in January 2024. In addition, the accused male student was also accused of assaulted one other student in the past, with the school district and Clearview Elementary school failing to report that incident as well and also not staffing the school bus with people to monitor the student. The lawsuit further stated that the school district's inaction and negligence led to additional assaults against other students. The lawsuit accused Red Lion District of violating not only Pennsylvania state law, but also both Title IX laws and equal protection rights under the 14th Amendment of the U.S. Constitution.
