= Wendy Fink =

American politician

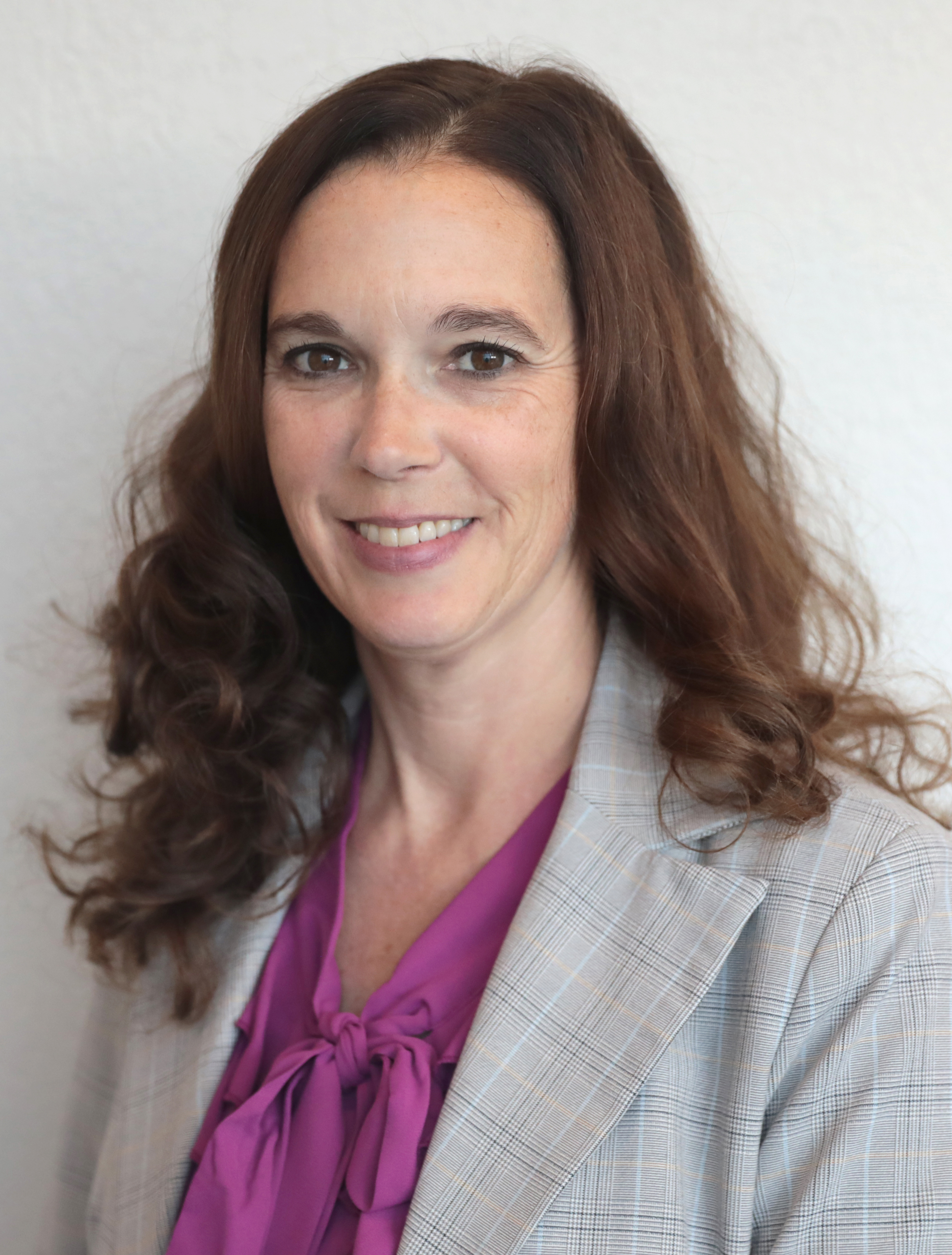

Member of the Pennsylvania House of Representatives from the 94th district
- Incumbent
- Assumed office January 3, 2023
- Preceded by: Stan Saylor

Personal details
- Party: Republican
- Spouse: Jason Fink
- Children: 4
- Education: Millersville University of Pennsylvania
- Occupation: Educator
- Website: repwendyfink.com

Wendy Fink is an American politician who was elected to the Pennsylvania House of Representatives as a Republican to represent the 94th district.

== Early life ==
Fink is a lifelong resident of York County. She attended the Red Lion High School, graduating in 1995. She graduated from Millersville University with a bachelor's degree in Elementary and Early Childhood Education. She worked as a substitute teacher for the Red Lion Area School District until 1997, after which she was a stay-at-home mom for 16 years. She returned to teaching in 2020 at Grace Academy (a private school in York). She homeschools her children. She lives with her husband and three of her four children in Windsor Township.

== Political career ==
Fink defeated incumbent Representative Stan Saylor, who had been in office for 15 terms, in the Republican primaries for the 2022 Pennsylvania House of Representatives election. She was unopposed in the general election. She has generally been described as further right-wing than Saylor due to running on an anti-establishment platform against career politicians. Her defeat of Saylor, and Joe D'Orsie's defeat of Keith J. Gillespie, another career politician defeated in the primary, resulted in the resignation of Chairman of the York County Republican Committee, Jeff Piccola. Fink opened her district office in Red Lion.

She is a member of the Pennsylvania Freedom Caucus.

== Election results ==
PA House election, 2022 primary: Pennsylvania House, District 94
Party	Candidate	Votes	%	±%
Republican	Wendy Fink	5,429	55.55	▲55.55
Republican	Stan Saylor	4,317	44.17	▼55.83
Republican	Write-Ins	273	0.28	▲0.28
Margin of victory		1,112	11.38	▼88.62
Turnout		10,019	100	

PA House election, 2022 Republican primary: Pennsylvania House, District 94
Party	Candidate	Votes	%
Republican	Wendy Fink	19,599	100
Turnout		19,599	100
