= John Hope Anderson =

American politician (1912–2005)

Member of the Pennsylvania House of Representatives from the 94th district
- In office January 7, 1969 – November 30, 1982
- Preceded by: District created
- Succeeded by: Gregory Snyder

Member of the Pennsylvania House of Representatives from the York County district
- In office January 1, 1961 – November 30, 1968

Personal details
- Born: May 2, 1912 New Park, Pennsylvania
- Died: May 26, 2005 (aged 93) New Park, Pennsylvania
- Party: Republican

John Hope Anderson (May 2, 1912 – May 26, 2005) was a former Republican member of the Pennsylvania House of Representatives.
