= Guinston United Presbyterian Church =

Historic church in Pennsylvania, United States

- U.S. National Register of Historic Places
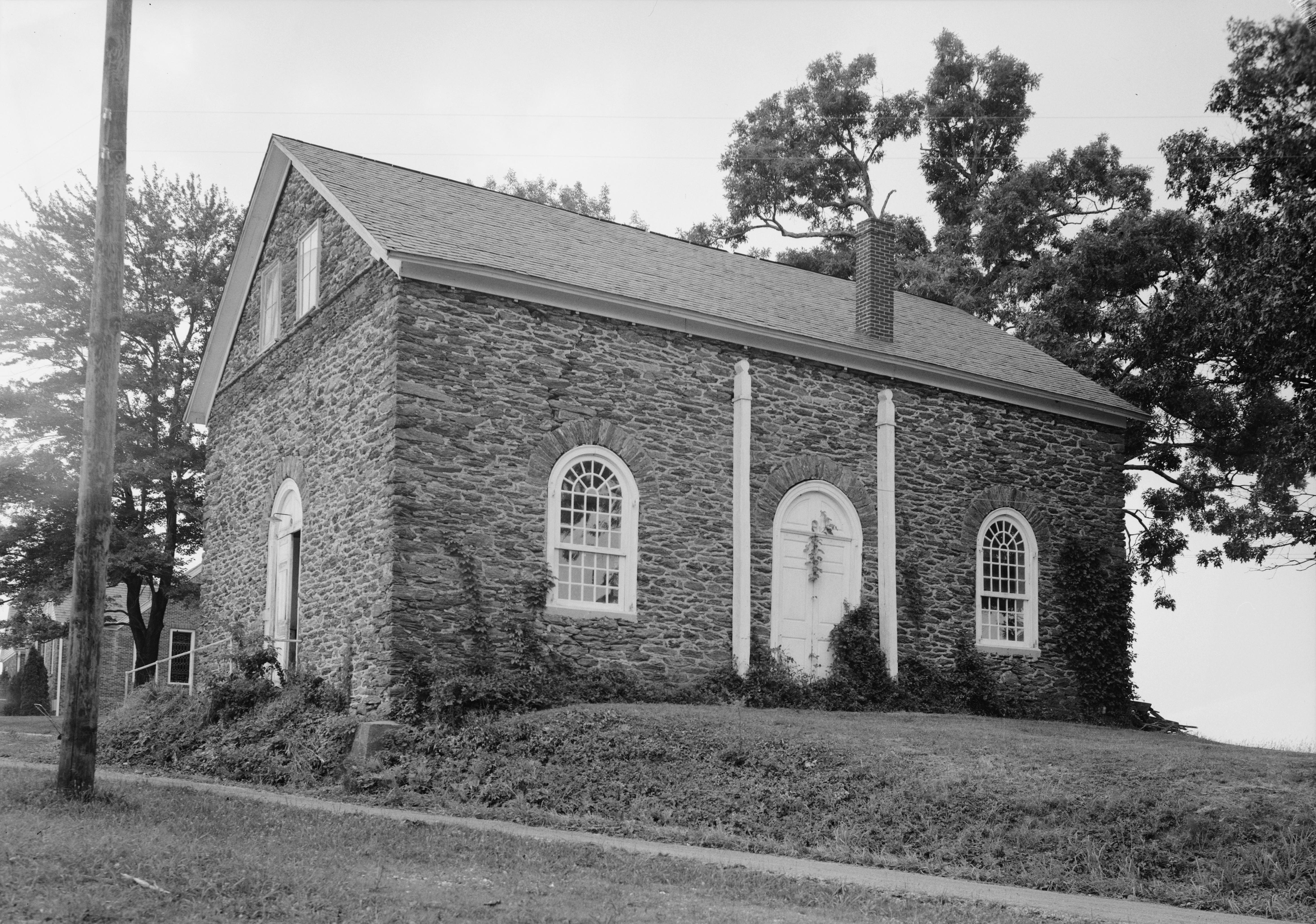

- Location within Pennsylvania Location within the United States
- Location: East of Laurel off Pennsylvania Route 74 (14130 Guinston Forge Road), Chanceford Township, Pennsylvania
- Coordinates: 39°50′4″N 76°29′30″W
- Area: less than one acre
- Built: 1773
- NRHP reference No.: 76001682
- Added to NRHP: January 11, 1976

The Guinston United Presbyterian Church is an historic Presbyterian church building which is located in Chanceford Township, Pennsylvania, York County, Pennsylvania.

It was added to the National Register of Historic Places in 1976.

== History and architectural features ==
Built in 1773, the Guinston United Presbyterian Church is a one-story, fieldstone building with minimal ornamentation. It features paneled semi-circular inserts above the doors and rounded arch windows.

It replaced an earlier log church which had been built in 1754. By 1867, that structure was used as a Sabbath School while a new sanctuary was built nearby.
