= Brogue, Pennsylvania =

Unincorporated community in Pennsylvania, US

Coordinates: 39°52′18″N 76°28′59″W

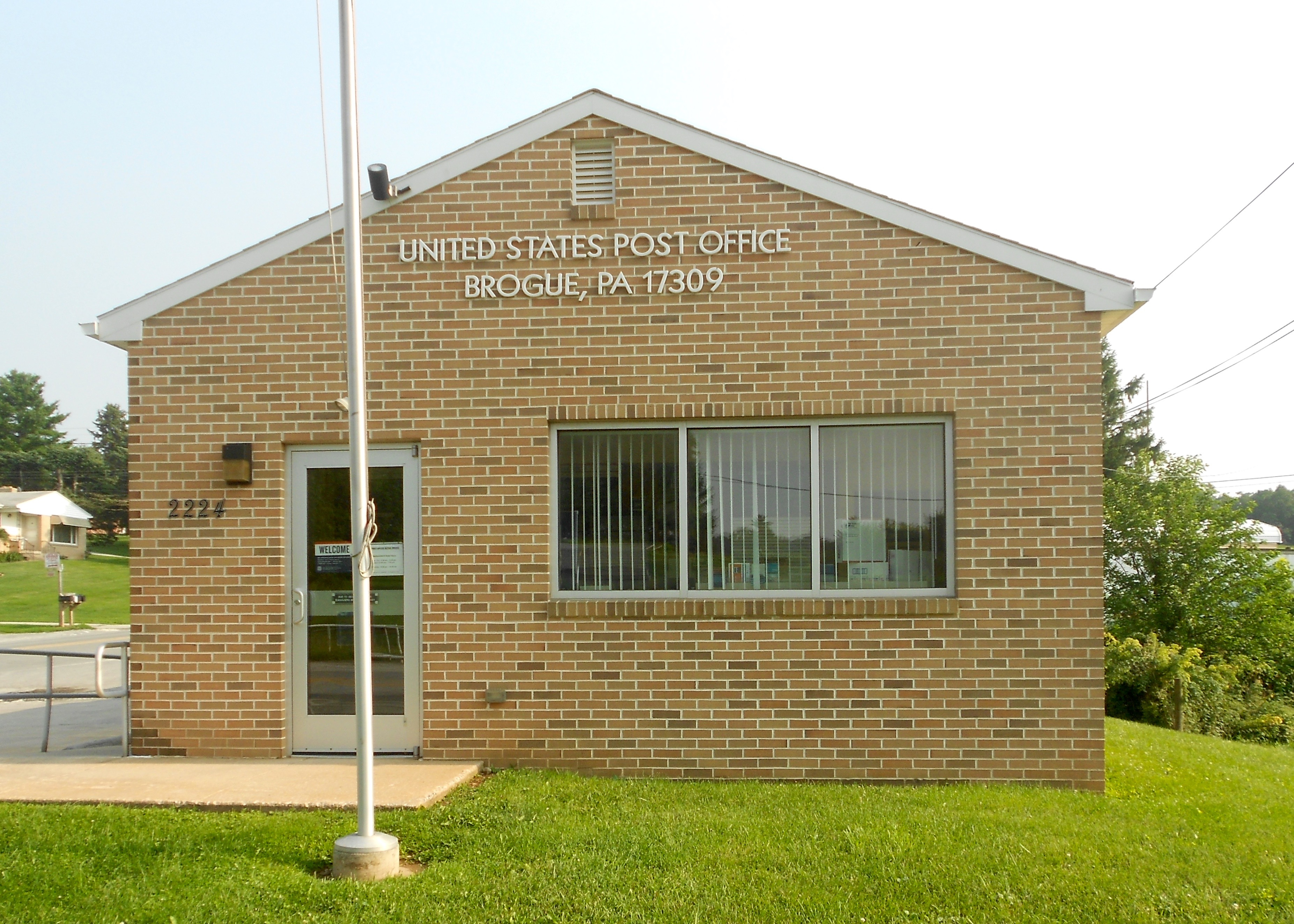
Post office

Brogue is an unincorporated community in Chanceford Township, York County, Pennsylvania, United States. Brogue is located on Pennsylvania Route 74, seven miles (11 km) east-southeast of Red Lion. Brogue should not be confused with Brogueville, another unincorporated community in Chanceford Township, located approximately four miles (6.4 km) southwest.

The ZIP code for Brogue, 17309, covers 24.79 square miles (64.2 km^{2}) and includes 2,086 residents. The unincorporated community of Shenks Ferry is also included in the zip code.
