= Gregory Snyder =

American politician

Member of the Pennsylvania House of Representatives from the 94th district
- In office January 6, 1983 – November 30, 1992
- Preceded by: John Hope Anderson
- Succeeded by: Stan Saylor

Personal details
- Born: April 11, 1953 (age 73) York County, Pennsylvania
- Party: Republican

Gregory M. Snyder (born April 11, 1953) is a former Republican member of the Pennsylvania House of Representatives. He is now commissioned as a judge in the Court of Common Pleas of York County, Pennsylvania.
