= Chestnut Hill (Windsor Township, York County, Pennsylvania) =

Historic house in Pennsylvania, United States

- U.S. National Register of Historic Places
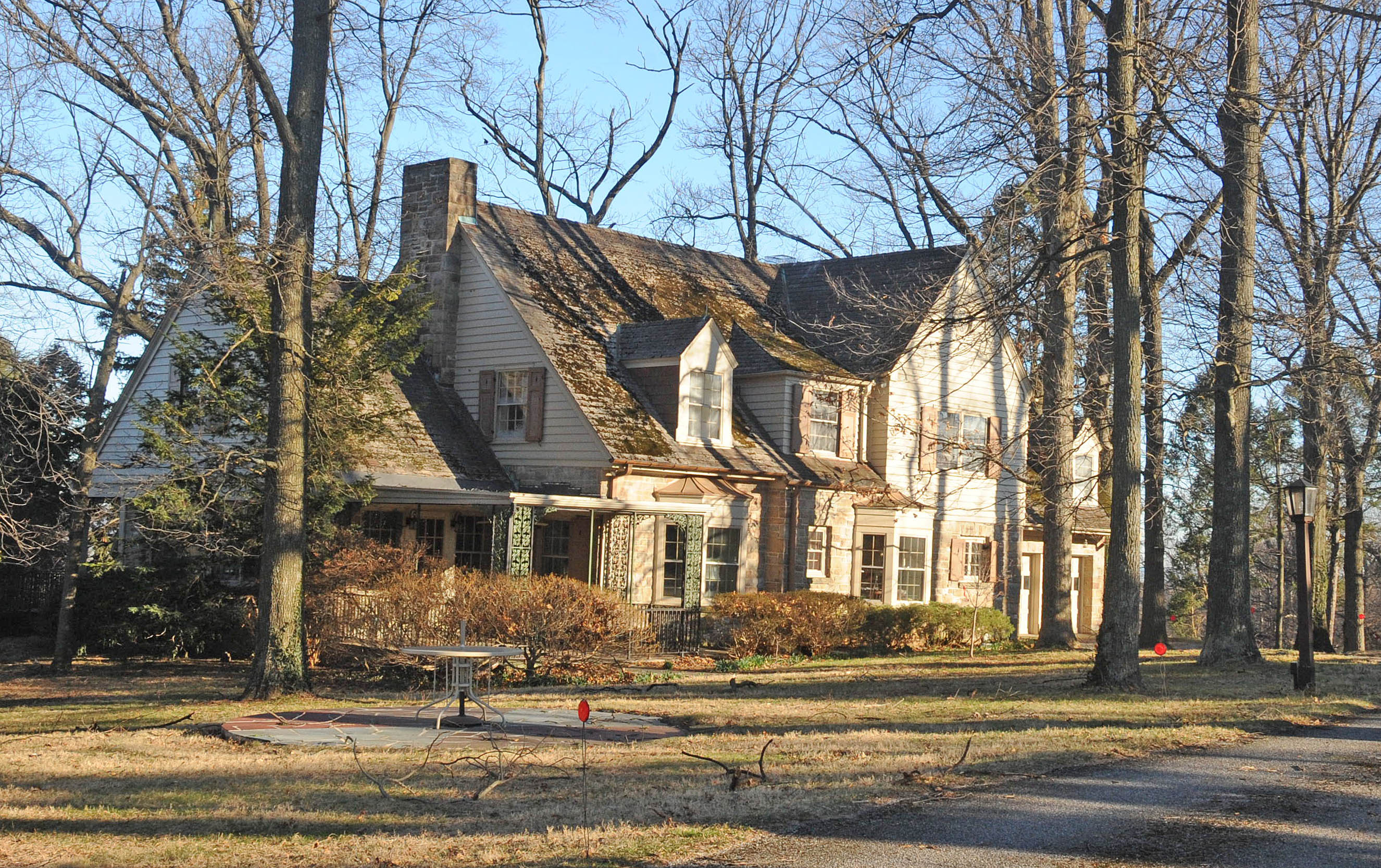

- Location within Pennsylvania Location within the United States
- Location: 1105 Windsor Rd., Windsor Township, Pennsylvania
- Coordinates: 39°56′22″N 76°37′1″W
- Area: 6.3 acres (2.5 ha)
- Built: 1941
- Architect: Flickinger, George Samuel
- Architectural style: Colonial Revival
- NRHP reference No.: 01000952
- Added to NRHP: September 1, 2001

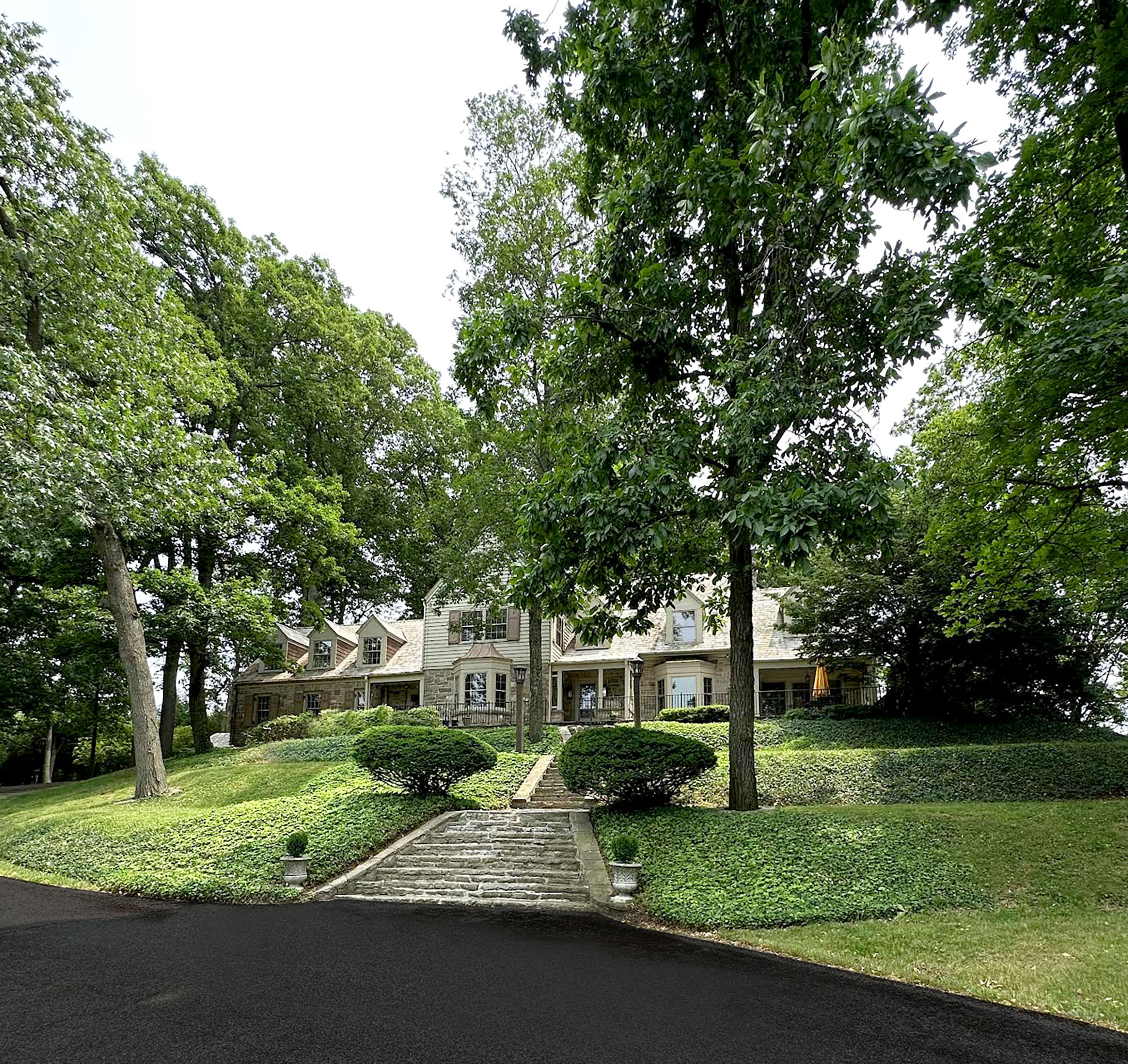

Chestnut Hill is a historic home located at Windsor Township, York County, Pennsylvania. It was built in 1940–1941, and is a 2-story, plus basement, Colonial Revival-style dwelling. It measures 94 feet wide and has a cross gable of 40 feet deep. The first story is sandstone and the second is sheathed in redwood clapboard. It features direct outdoor access from all rooms on the main floor and an elliptical, two-story front hall with a spiral staircase. Also on the property are a contributing picnic pavilion (c. 1936) and playhouse /toolshed (1941).

It was added to the National Register of Historic Places in 2001.

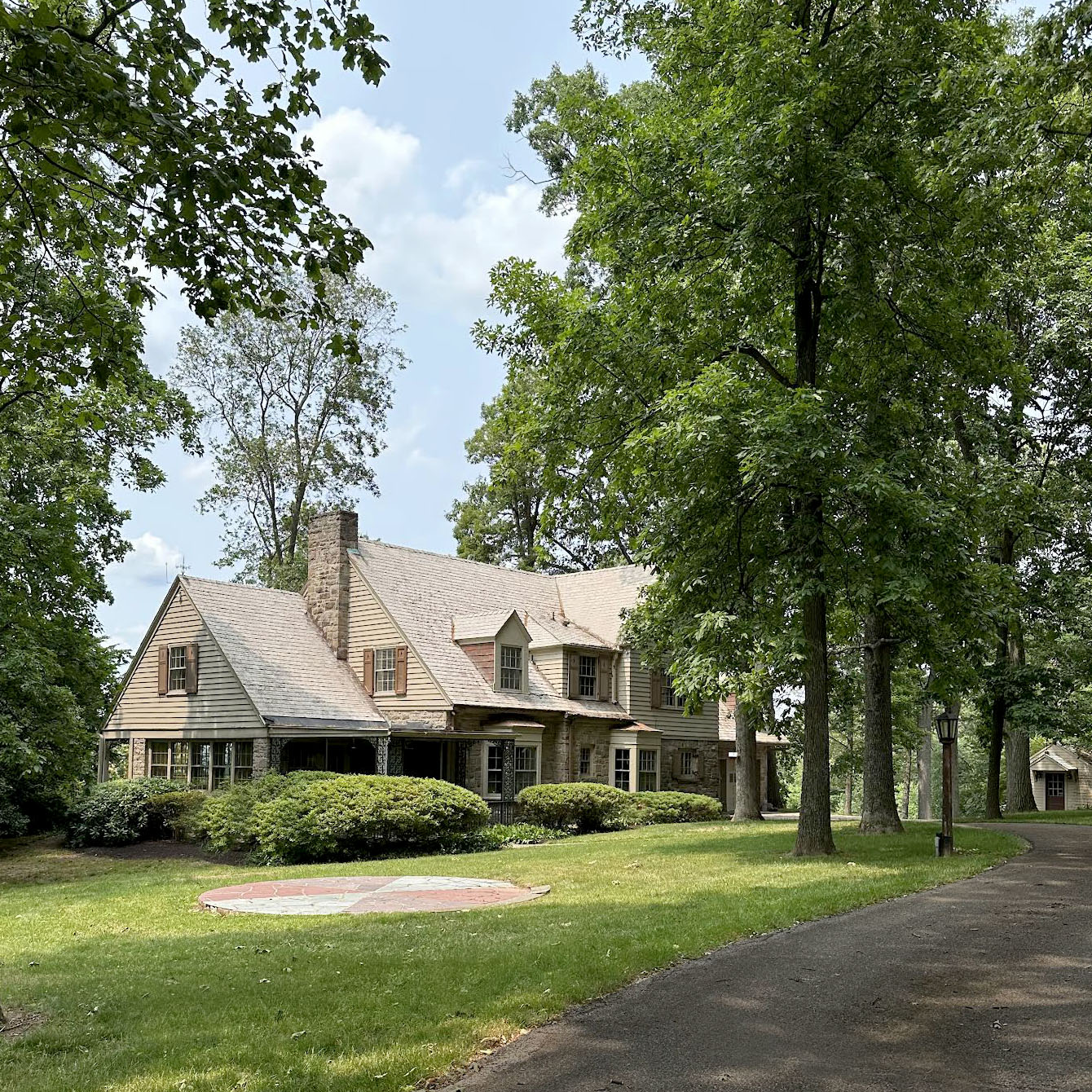
