= Jimmy Sheckard =

American baseball player (1878–1947)

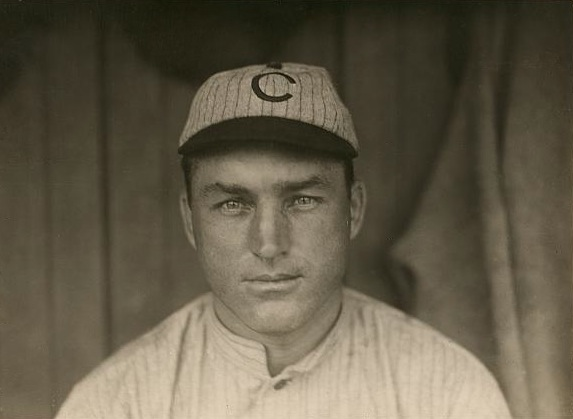
- Left fielder
- Born: November 23, 1878; Chanceford Township, Pennsylvania, U.S.
- Died: January 15, 1947 (aged 68); Lancaster, Pennsylvania, U.S.
- Batted: Left Threw: Right

MLB debut
- September 14, 1897, for the Brooklyn Bridegrooms

Last MLB appearance
- September 28, 1913, for the Cincinnati Reds

MLB statistics
- Batting average: .274
- Hits: 2,084
- Home runs: 56
- Runs batted in: 813
- Stolen bases: 465
- Stats at Baseball Reference

Teams
- Brooklyn Bridegrooms (1897–1898); Baltimore Orioles (NL) (1899); Brooklyn Superbas (1900–1901); Baltimore Orioles (AL) (1902); Brooklyn Superbas (1902–1905); Chicago Cubs (1906–1912); St. Louis Cardinals (1913); Cincinnati Reds (1913)

Career highlights and awards
- 2× World Series champion (1907, 1908); NL home run leader (1903); 2× NL stolen base leader (1899, 1903)

Samuel James Tilden Sheckard (November 23, 1878 – January 15, 1947) was an American left fielder in Major League Baseball who played for the Brooklyn Bridegrooms/Superbas, Baltimore Orioles (NL), Baltimore Orioles (AL), Chicago Cubs, St. Louis Cardinals, and Cincinnati Reds.

Making his debut at the age of 18 late in 1897, he played in three separate stints for the team (1897–1898, 1900–1901, 1902–1905). In his one season with Baltimore in 1899, he led the National League in stolen bases with 77. Back with Brooklyn in 1900, he won the National League pennant with the team. In 1903, he led the league in stolen bases with 67 and home runs with nine while batting .332. He landed with the Chicago Cubs in 1906 and wound up playing in the World Series four times in a five-year span (1906, 1907, 1908, 1910), which saw the Cubs win in 1907 and 1908; he was the leadoff batter in the final game of the 1908 World Series, the last won by the team for 108 years.

He spent his final season with the Cardinals and Reds in 1913. When he retired, he was one of just sixteen players with 2,000 games played in MLB history and second in walks with 1,135.

== Career ==
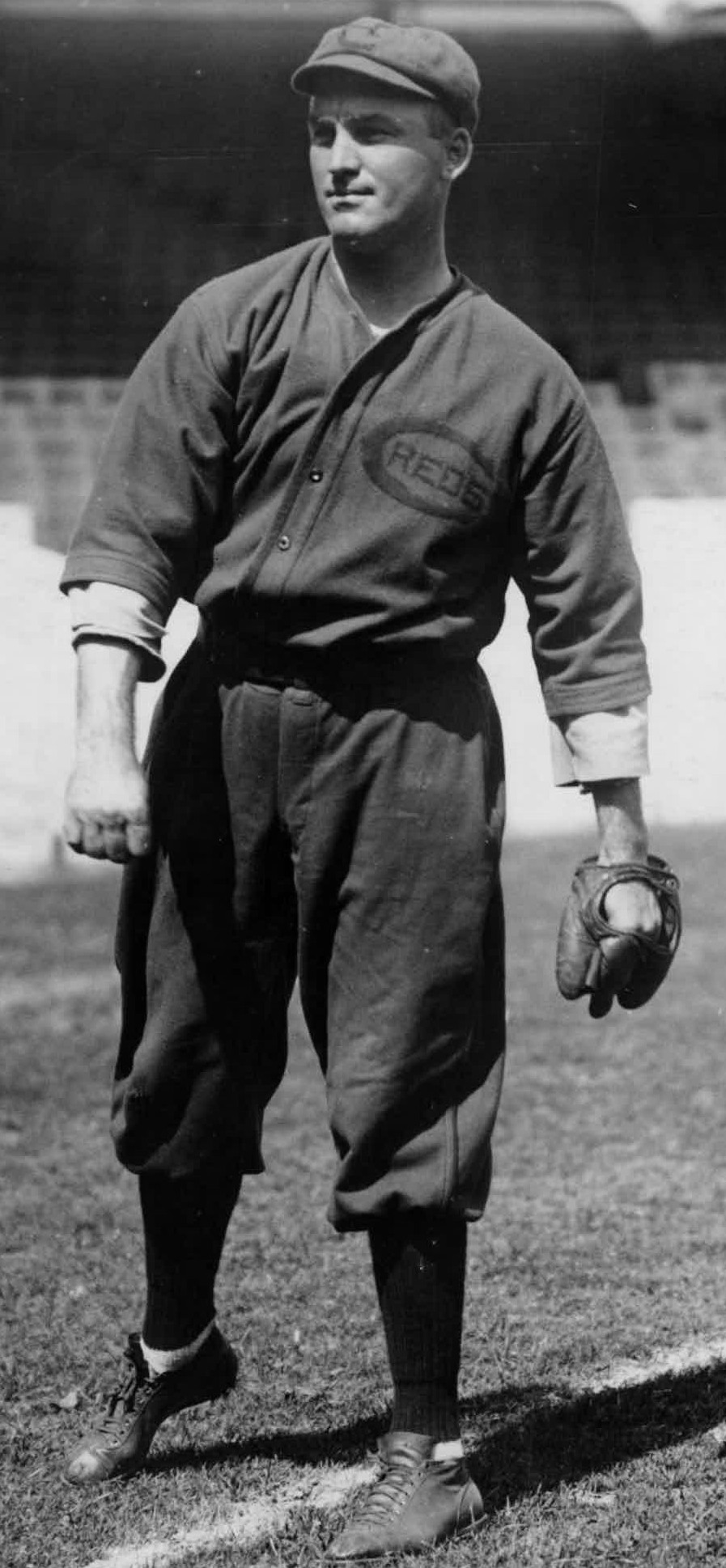
Sheckard photographed by Charles M. Conlon in 1913

Sheckard was born in Chanceford Township, York County, Pennsylvania. He enjoyed a great 1901 season with the Superbas, hitting .353 with 11 home runs and 104 runs batted in, and leading the league with 19 triples and a .534 slugging average. In that season Sheckard became the first and so far only player to hit inside the park grand slams in two consecutive games.

With Baltimore in 1899, Sheckard led the league with 77 stolen bases. He played in four World Series with the Cubs, winning championships in 1907 and 1908. He led the league in 1911 with 121 runs and 147 walks. The walks were a major league record for nine years until he was passed by Babe Ruth in 1920; he still holds the Cubs franchise record for walks in a season.

The 1906 World Series, matching the Cubs and Chicago White Sox, saw the dubious distinction of both teams having a player go hitless in 21 at-bats: Sheckard went 0-for-21 for the Cubs with an RBI groundout and a stolen base while Billy Sullivan for the White Sox went 0-for-21, but the White Sox prevailed in six games.

Sheckard was the first player to lead the league in homers and steals in the same season (1903). Ty Cobb (1909) and Chuck Klein (1932) are the only other players to do so in the majors.

Sheckard was also a good outfielder. He holds the all-time single season major league record for double plays at two separate positions. His 12 double plays as a left fielder in 1911 for the Cubs are two more than any other left fielder in history. In 1899, while playing for the Baltimore Orioles, Sheckard played right field and set the record for double plays by a right fielder with 14. See related article on all time double play leaders.

After the 1913 season, Sheckard retired. When the Reds traded Joe Tinker, creating a managerial vacancy, Sheckard warned that Tinker's replacement would have a tough job ahead. "No matter who gets Tinker's place, the new manager will have to get rid of the 'knockers' on that club before he can hope to succeed. There is no chance to win with players who think more of their own records than they do of the success of the club."

In his 17-year career, Sheckard hit .274, with 56 home runs, 813 RBI, 1296 runs, 354 doubles, 136 triples, and 465 stolen bases in 2122 games played. In 1911, he set the single season record for walks with 147 before it was broken by Babe Ruth in 1920. He is one of only four players in the modern era (1900-present) to hold this record along with Ruth, Jack Crooks, and Barry Bonds. Sheckard is also the all-time leader among left fielders in assists, with 243.

Sheckard died at age 68 in Lancaster, Pennsylvania, from injuries suffered when he was struck by a motorist while walking to work along a highway.

== Highlights ==
- Twice led league in stolen bases (1899, 1903)
- Led league in home runs (1903)
- Led league in runs (1911)
- Led league in triples (1901)
- Led league times on base (1911)

== See also ==
- List of Major League Baseball career hits leaders
- List of Major League Baseball career triples leaders
- List of Major League Baseball career runs scored leaders
- List of Major League Baseball annual home run leaders
- List of Major League Baseball annual runs scored leaders
- List of Major League Baseball annual stolen base leaders
- List of Major League Baseball annual triples leaders
- List of Major League Baseball career stolen bases leaders
