= North Hopewell Township, Pennsylvania =

Township in Pennsylvania, US

Coordinates: 39°50′00″N 76°37′59″W

- Township
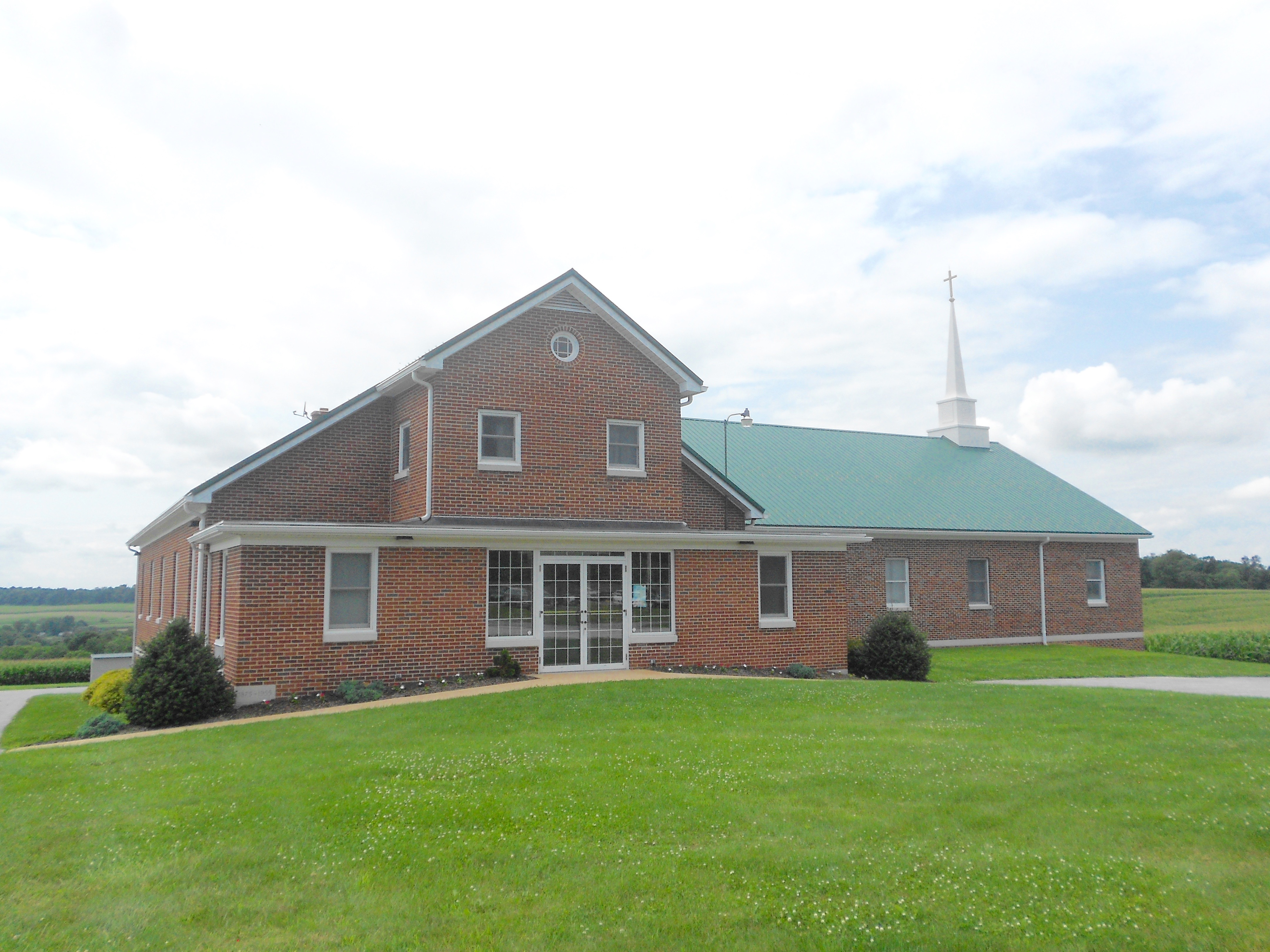
- Pleasant View Church

- Location in York County and the state of Pennsylvania.
- Country: United States
- State: Pennsylvania
- County: York
- Settled: 1734
- Incorporated: 1885

Government
  - Type: Board of Supervisors

Area
  - Total: 18.70 sq mi (48.43 km^{2})
  - Land: 18.70 sq mi (48.43 km^{2})
  - Water: 0 sq mi (0.00 km^{2})

Population (2020)
  - Total: 2,731 ▼
  - Estimate (2023): 2,736
  - Density: 149.8/sq mi (57.84/km^{2})
- Time zone: UTC-5 (Eastern (EST))
  - Summer (DST): UTC-4 (EDT)
- Area code: 717
- FIPS code: 42-133-55112
- Website: https://www.northhopewelltwp.com/

Historical population
Census	Pop.	Note	%±
2000	2,507		—
2010	2,791		11.3%
2020	2,731		−2.1%
2023 (est.)	2,736		0.2%
U.S. Decennial Census

North Hopewell Township is a township that is located in York County, Pennsylvania, United States. The population was 2,731 at the time of the 2020 census.

== Geography ==
According to the United States Census Bureau, the township has a total area of 18.6 square miles (48.1 km^{2}), all land. The township surrounds the borough of Winterstown.

== Demographics ==
As of the census of 2000, there were 2,507 people, 942 households, and 736 families living in the township.

The population density was 135.0 inhabitants per square mile (52.1/km^{2}). There were 984 housing units at an average density of 53.0 per square mile (20.5/km^{2}).

The racial makeup of the township was 98.32% White, 0.36% African American, 0.12% Native American, 0.24% Asian, and 0.96% from two or more races. Hispanic or Latino of any race were 0.56% of the population.

There were 942 households, out of which 34.4% had children under the age of eighteen living with them, 69.2% were married couples living together, 5.6% had a female householder with no husband present, and 21.8% were non-families. 17.2% of all households were made up of individuals, and 6.3% had someone living alone who was sixty-five years of age or older.

The average household size was 2.66 and the average family size was 3.01.

Within the township, the population was spread out, with 24.6% of residents who were under the age of eighteen, 5.0% who were aged eighteen to twenty-four, 31.1% who were aged twenty-five to forty-four, 28.1% who were aged forty-five to sixty-four, and 11.2% who were sixty-five years of age or older. The median age was forty years.

For every one hundred females, there were 101.7 males. For every one hundred females who were aged eighteen or older, there were 97.8 males.

The median income for a household in the township was $47,139, and the median income for a family was $55,438. Males had a median income of $37,588 compared with that of $26,646 for females.

The per capita income for the township was $20,993.

Approximately 2.3% of families and 2.5% of the population were living below the poverty line, including 2.5% of those who were under the age of eighteen. None of those aged sixty-five or older were living in poverty.
