= New Park, Pennsylvania =

Unincorporated community in Pennsylvania, U.S.

Coordinates: 39°44′05″N 76°30′20″W

New Park is an unincorporated community in York County, Pennsylvania, United States.

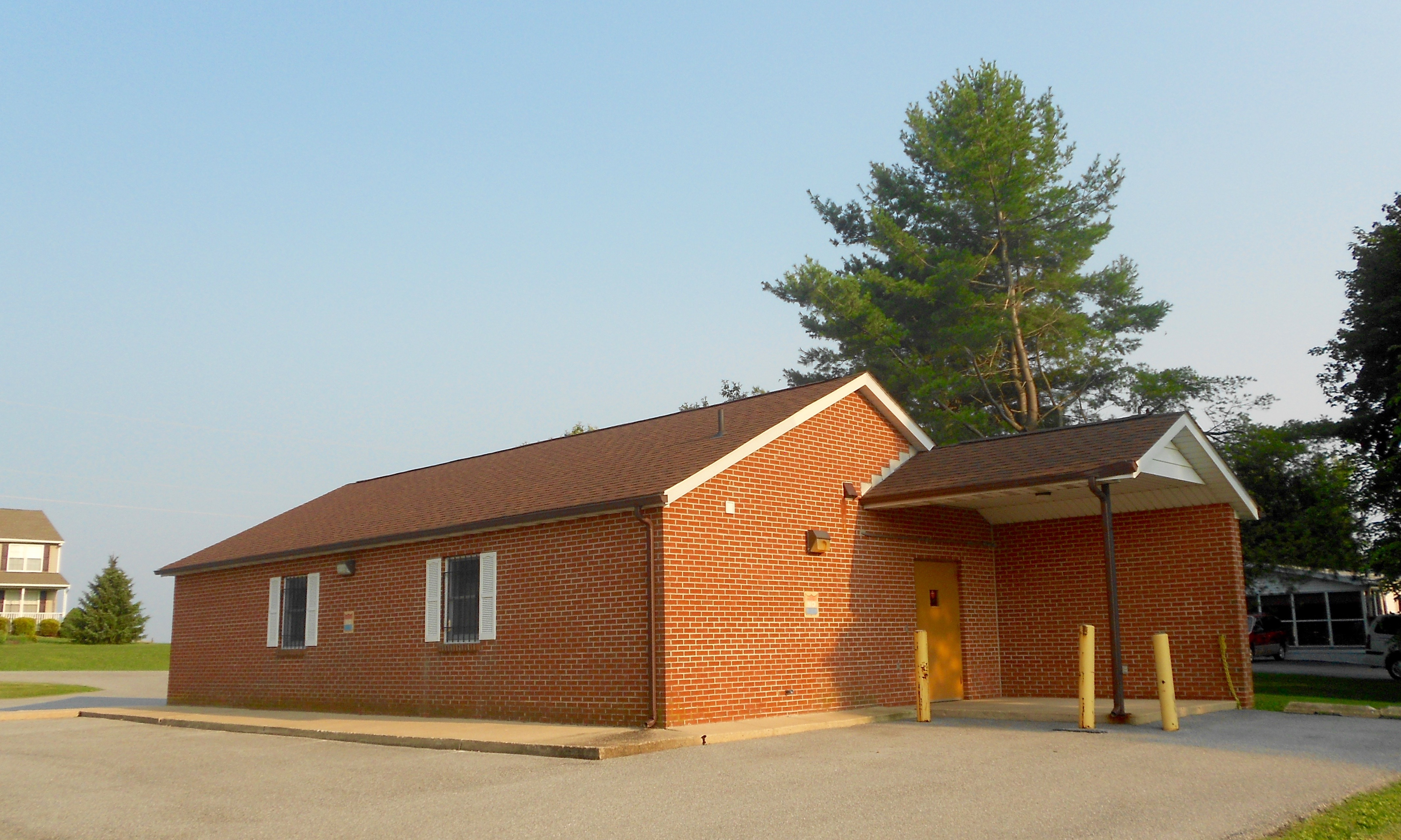
New Park Post Office, 17352
