= Chanceford Township, Pennsylvania =

Township in Pennsylvania, US

Coordinates: 39°55′00″N 76°27′59″W

- Township
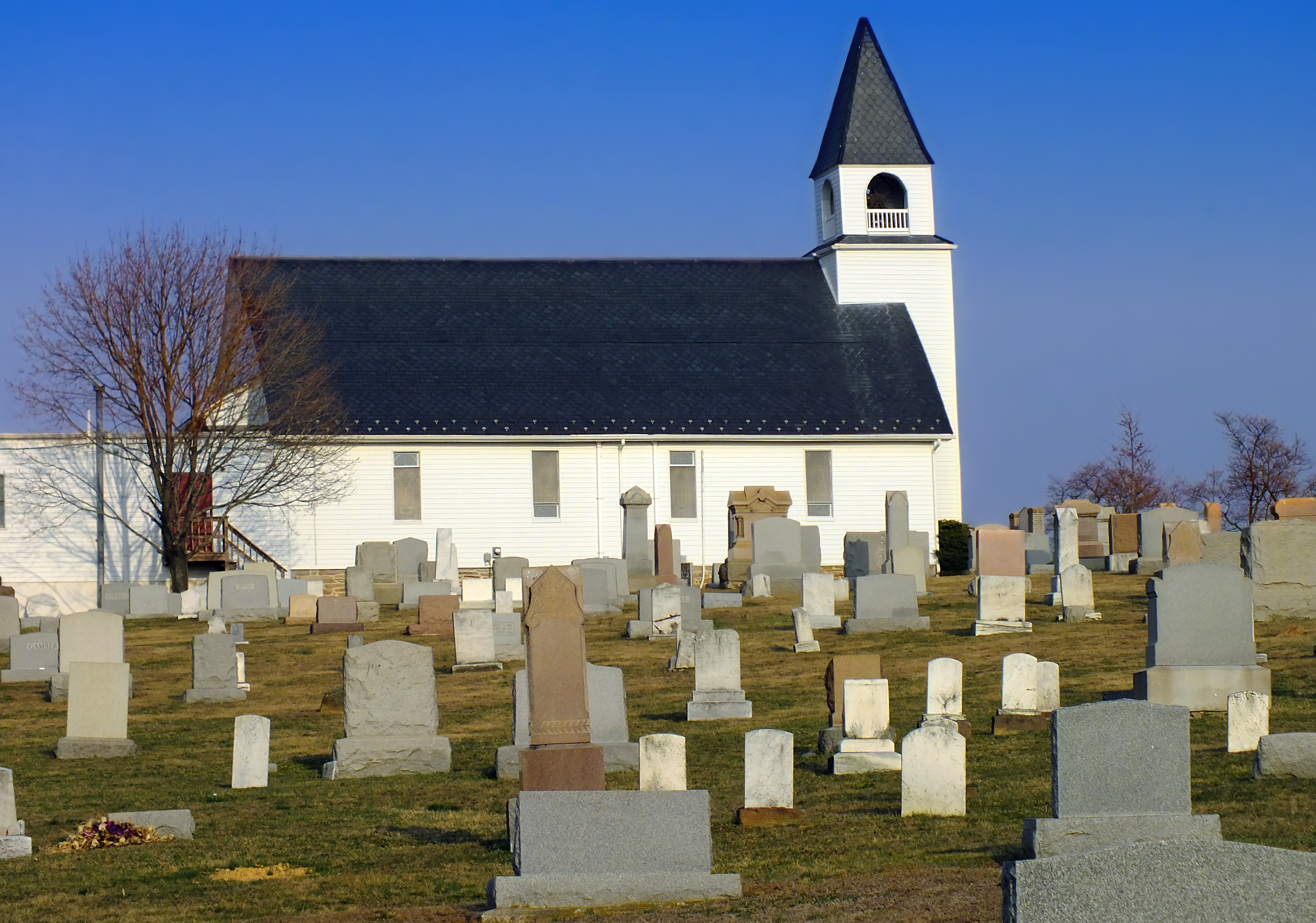
- St. Luke's (Stabley's) Lutheran Church, New Bridgeville, PA

- Seal

- Location in York County and the state of Pennsylvania.
- Country: United States
- State: Pennsylvania
- County: York
- Settled: 1735
- Incorporated: 1747

Government
  - Type: Board of Supervisors

Area
  - Total: 48.46 sq mi (125.51 km^{2})
  - Land: 48.46 sq mi (125.51 km^{2})
  - Water: 0 sq mi (0.00 km^{2})

Population (2020)
  - Total: 5,939 ▼
  - Estimate (2023): 5,953
  - Density: 126.9/sq mi (49.01/km^{2})
- Time zone: UTC-5 (Eastern (EST))
  - Summer (DST): UTC-4 (EDT)
- Area code: 717
- FIPS code: 42-133-12584
- Website: Township website

Historical population
Census	Pop.	Note	%±
1850	1,614		—
1860	2,181		35.1%
1870	2,501		14.7%
1880	2,994		19.7%
1890	3,066		2.4%
1900	2,798		−8.7%
1910	2,754		−1.6%
1920	2,602		−5.5%
1930	2,354		−9.5%
1940	2,596		10.3%
1950	2,569		−1.0%
1960	2,665		3.7%
1970	3,119		17.0%
1980	4,584		47.0%
1990	5,026		9.6%
2000	5,973		18.8%
2010	6,111		2.3%
2020	5,939		−2.8%
2023 (est.)	5,953		0.2%
U.S. Decennial Census

Chanceford Township is a township located in the southeastern portion of York County, Pennsylvania, United States. The population was 5,939 at the 2020 census. The township is home to several campsites, Allegro Vineyards, and Apollo Park. The Mason-Dixon Trail runs through the township, and it borders the Susquehanna River on the east.

Among notable natives of the township was Johnson K. Duncan, one of a handful of Northern-born Confederate generals in the American Civil War.

== History ==
The Guinston United Presbyterian Church was added to the National Register of Historic Places in 1976.

== Geography ==
According to the United States Census Bureau, the township has a total area of 48.5 square miles (126 km^{2}), all land. The northeastern boundary of the township is the Susquehanna River. The borough of Felton is adjacent to the southwestern corner of the township. The township office is located near the center of the township, in the unincorporated community of Brogue

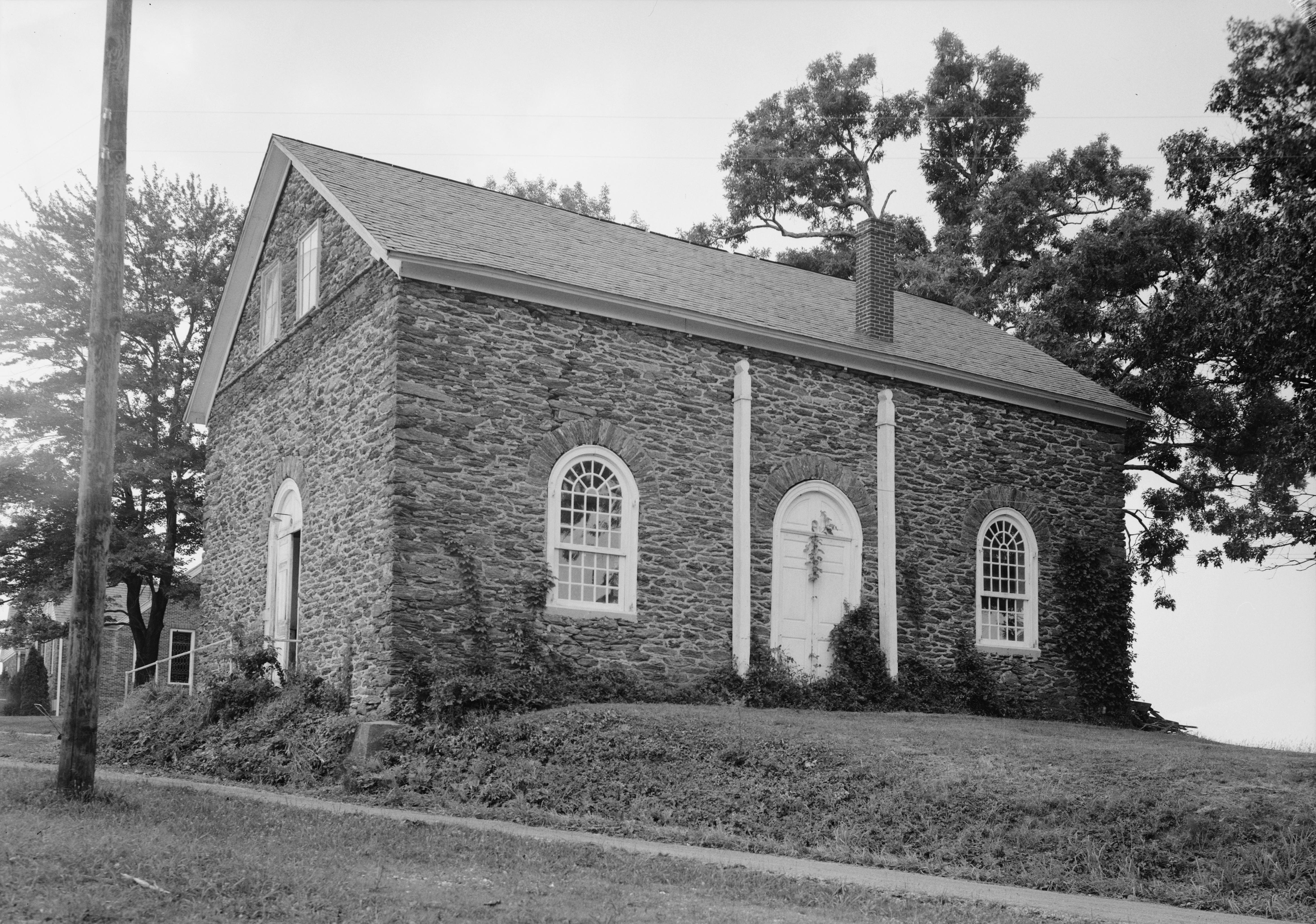
Guinston_United_Presbyterian_Church

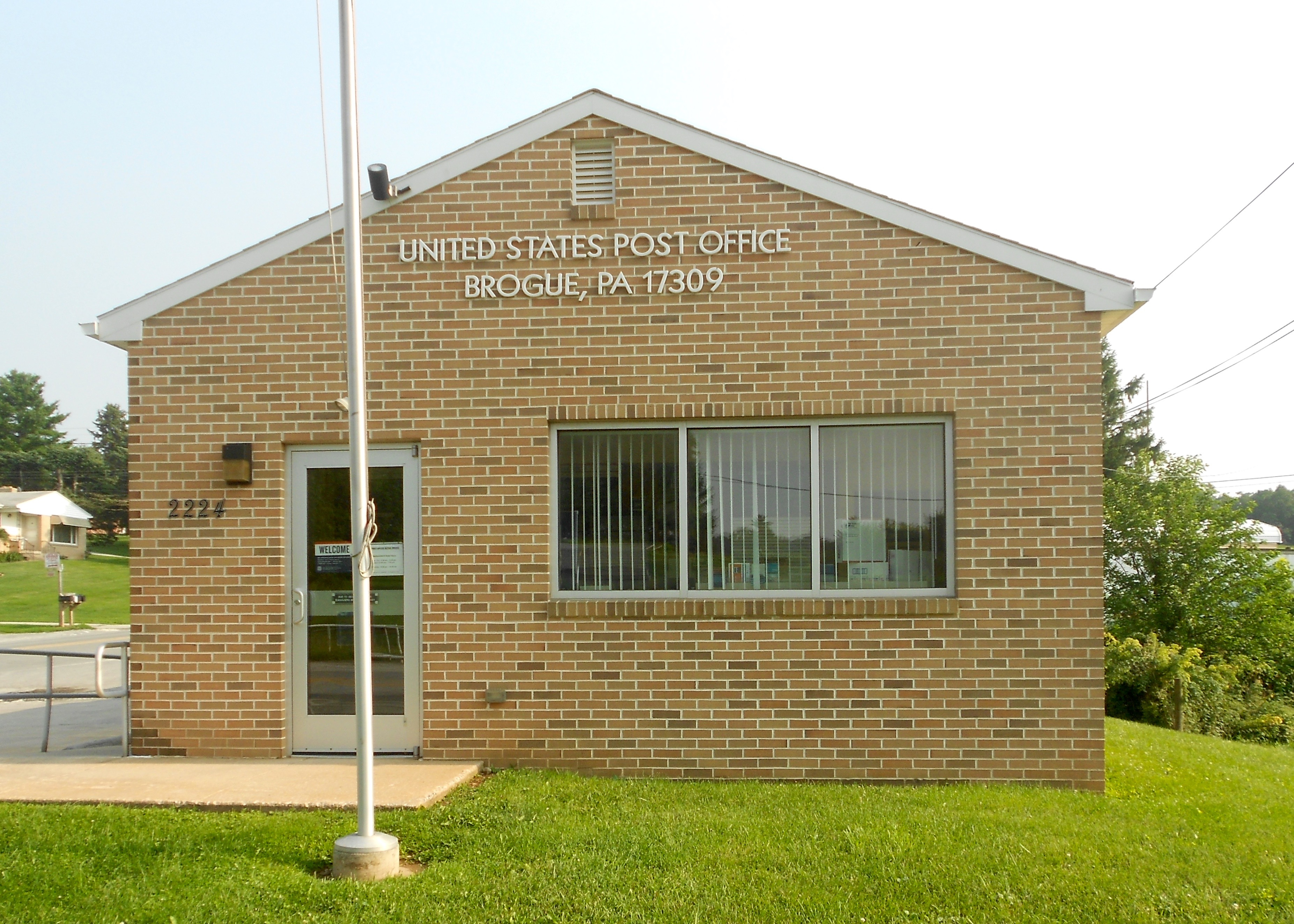
Brogue Post Office

== Demographics ==
As of the census of 2000, there were 5,973 people, 2,155 households, and 1,728 families living in the township. The population density was 123.1 inhabitants per square mile (47.5/km^{2}). There were 2,257 housing units at an average density of 46.5 units per square mile (18.0 units/km^{2}). The racial makeup of the township was 97.94% White, 0.65% African American, 0.28% Native American, 0.37% Asian, 0.13% from other races, and 0.62% from two or more races. Hispanic or Latino of any race were 0.67% of the population.

There were 2,155 households, out of which 39.1% had children under the age of 18 living with them, 69.8% were married couples living together, 6.2% had a female householder with no husband present, and 19.8% were non-families. 15.5% of all households were made up of individuals, and 6.4% had someone living alone who was 65 years of age or older. The average household size was 2.77 and the average family size was 3.07.

In the township the population was spread out, with 26.8% under the age of 18, 7.0% from 18 to 24, 33.0% from 25 to 44, 24.1% from 45 to 64, and 9.1% who were 65 years of age or older. The median age was 36 years. For every 100 females, there were 103.3 males. For every 100 females age 18 and over, there were 100.4 males.

The median income for a household in the township was $52,931, and the median income for a family was $57,285. Males had a median income of $39,063 versus $24,490 for females. The per capita income for the township was $22,425. About 2.9% of families and 5.3% of the population were below the poverty line, including 5.6% of those under age 18 and 7.2% of those age 65 or over.

== See also ==
- Jimmy Sheckard
