= Windsor Township, York County, Pennsylvania =

Township in Pennsylvania, US

Coordinates: 39°52′00″N 76°34′59″W

- Township
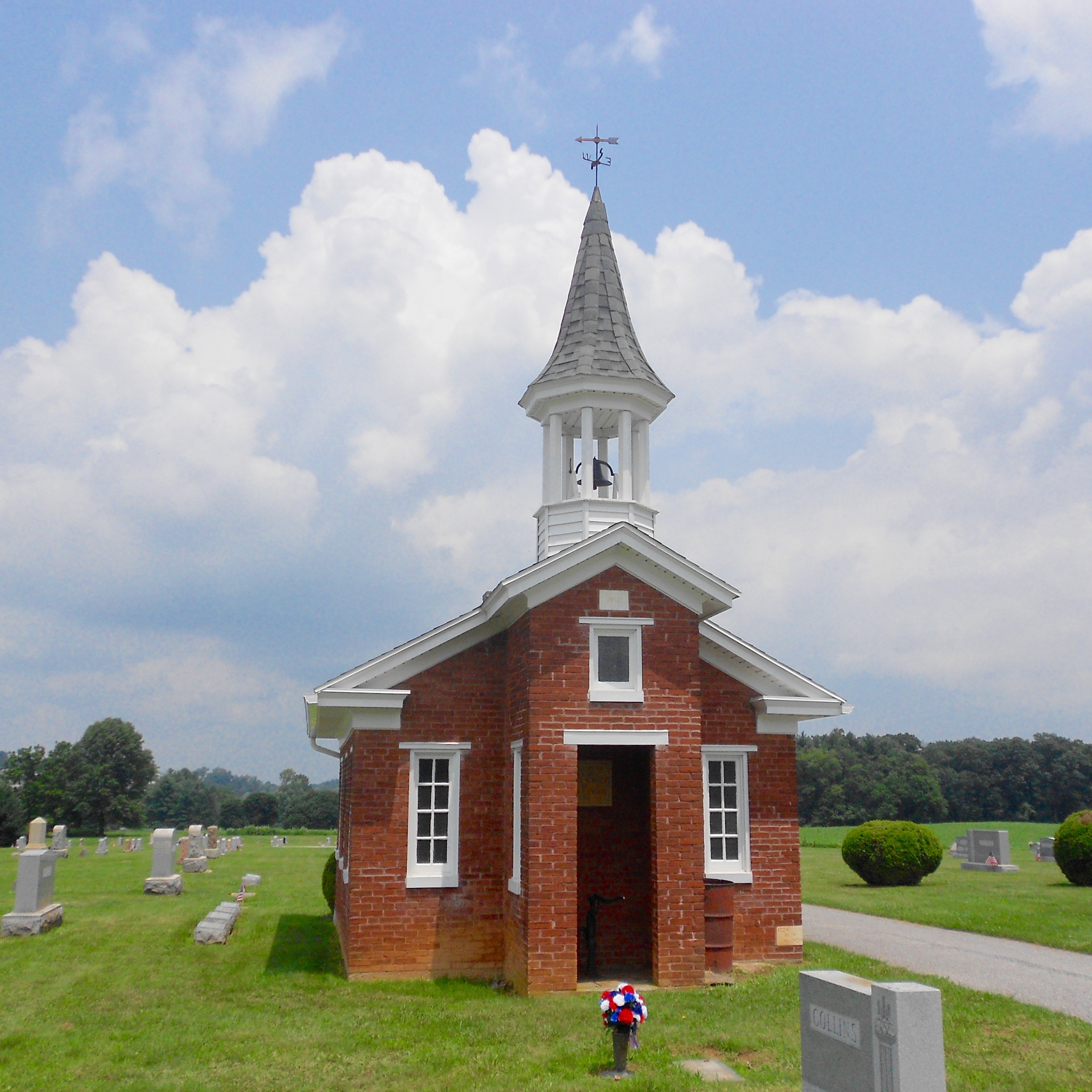
- Freysville

- Location in York County and the state of Pennsylvania.
- Country: United States
- State: Pennsylvania
- County: York
- Settled: 1735
- Incorporated: 1758

Government
  - Type: Board of Supervisors

Area
  - Total: 27.29 sq mi (70.69 km^{2})
  - Land: 27.28 sq mi (70.65 km^{2})
  - Water: 0.015 sq mi (0.04 km^{2})

Population (2020)
  - Total: 17,851 ▲
  - Estimate (2023): 17,975
  - Density: 658.8/sq mi (254.36/km^{2})
- Time zone: UTC-5 (Eastern (EST))
  - Summer (DST): UTC-4 (EDT)
- Area code: 717
- FIPS code: 42-133-85736
- Website: Windsor Township official website

Historical population
Census	Pop.	Note	%±
2000	12,807		—
2010	17,504		36.7%
2020	17,851		2.0%
2023 (est.)	17,975		0.7%
U.S. Decennial Census

Windsor Township is a township in York County, Pennsylvania, United States. The population was 17,851 at the 2020 census.

== History ==
Windsor Township was originally a part of Hellam Township, which was the original township of York County laid out by authority of the Provincial court at Lancaster in 1739. Windsor remained a part of Hellam Township until 1753 when a petition was presented to the court at York, signed by John Wright, Jr. asking that “Hallam Township be divided by a line on Stony Ridge, running across the valley to the next ridge of hills on the south side of Grist (Kreutz) Creek Valley, and also eastward along the last named ridge to the river Susquehanna.” This new township, York, included the current townships of Windsor, Lower Windsor, York and a portion of Spring Garden. Five years later, Windsor Township (which included Lower Windsor Township) formed out of York Township.

In April 1758, the following petition was presented at the April session of court: “We, your humble petitioners, hereby state that when the Townships of York and Hallam were in one, a division line was obtained which did not prove convenient or satisfactory; therefore we request that commissioners be appointed by your worshipfuls to lay off the new township.” The presiding justice, Thomas Armor, then appointed John Shultz, John Schyrack, Christian Shank and Michael Bart, to view and run the boundary line which was as follows:

Beginning at the plantation of Peter Peterman, thence with the road to David Hunter’s, thence with the same to Shrewsbury Township (now Springfield and Hopewell), thence with the same township and the township of Chanceford to the Susquehanna, and up the same to Hallam Township, thence along the middle of that ridge of hills to Peter Peterman’s plantation and place of beginning, which last described township is to be called by the name of Windsor.

The name Windsor is attributed to Thomas Armor who was born in Windsor, England and was a large landowner, in addition to being the presiding justice at the creation of the township.

=== Architecture ===
The Chestnut Hill, a historical home built in the "colonial-revival" style in 1940–1941, was listed on the National Register of Historic Places in 2001.

== Geography ==
According to the United States Census Bureau, the township has a total area of 27.2 square miles (70 km^{2}), of which 0.04% is water. The township completely encircles the borough of Windsor. The borough of Red Lion lies along the western border of the township, and the borough of Felton is adjacent to the township's southeastern corner.

== Demographics ==
As of the census of 2000, there were 12,807 people, 4,906 households, and 3,836 families residing in the township. The population density was 470.5 inhabitants per square mile (181.7/km^{2}). There were 5,084 housing units at an average density of 186.8 per square mile (72.1/km^{2}). The racial makeup of the township was 98.04% White, 0.40% African American, 0.09% Native American, 0.62% Asian, 0.04% Pacific Islander, 0.23% from other races, and 0.59% from two or more races. Hispanic or Latino of any race were 0.92% of the population.

There were 4,906 households, out of which 34.5% had children under the age of 18 living with them, 69.4% were married couples living together, 5.4% had a female householder with no husband present, and 21.8% were non-families. 17.8% of all households were made up of individuals, and 7.9% had someone living alone who was 65 years of age or older. The average household size was 2.60 and the average family size was 2.94.

In the township the population was spread out, with 24.8% under the age of 18, 5.3% from 18 to 24, 31.2% from 25 to 44, 25.6% from 45 to 64, and 13.1% who were 65 years of age or older. The median age was 39 years. For every 100 females, there were 97.8 males. For every 100 females age 18 and over, there were 95.3 males.

The median income for a household in the township was $49,706, and the median income for a family was $53,271. Males had a median income of $36,691 versus $24,980 for females. The per capita income for the township was $21,551. About 2.4% of families and 3.4% of the population were below the poverty line, including 3.3% of those under age 18 and 4.5% of those age 65 or over.
