= Felton, Pennsylvania =

Borough in Pennsylvania, US

- Borough
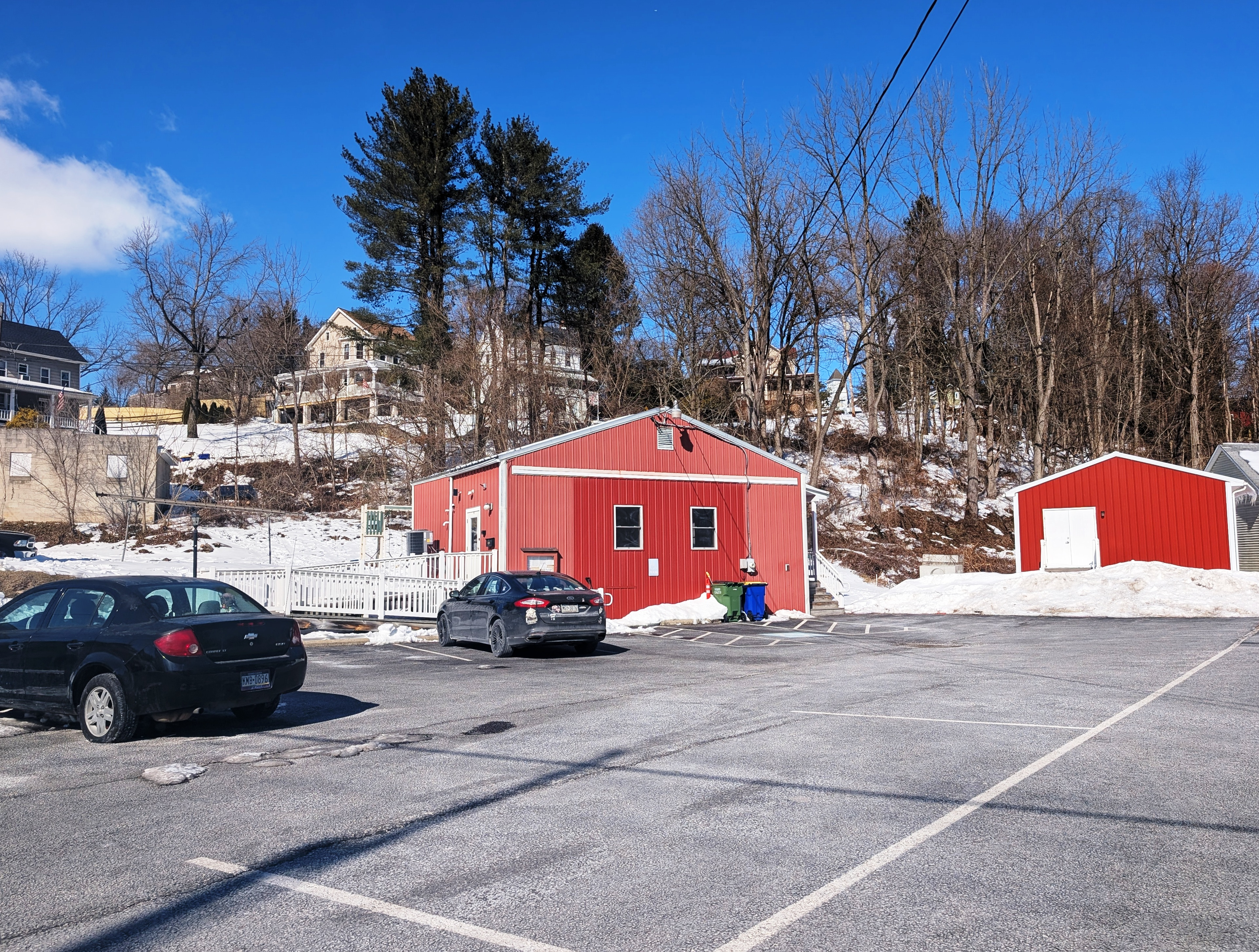
- Felton Borough Offices

- Location in York County and the U.S. state of Pennsylvania.

- Location of Felton in Pennsylvania Felton (the United States)
- Coordinates: 39°51′17″N 76°33′51″W
- Country: United States
- State: Pennsylvania
- County: York
- Incorporated: 1899

Government
  - Type: Borough Council

Area
  - Total: 0.63 sq mi (1.63 km^{2})
  - Land: 0.63 sq mi (1.63 km^{2})
  - Water: 0 sq mi (0.00 km^{2})
- Elevation: 663 ft (202 m)

Population (2020)
  - Total: 501
  - Density: 795.4/sq mi (307.12/km^{2})
- Time zone: UTC-5 (Eastern (EST))
  - Summer (DST): UTC-4 (EDT)
- Zip code: 17322
- Area code: 717
- FIPS code: 42-25584
- Website: https://feltonboroughpa.com/

Felton is a borough in York County, Pennsylvania, United States. The population was 501 at the 2020 census. It is part of the York–Hanover metropolitan area. Named after Johannes Felton Ziegler. The borough is located within the Red Lion Area School District.

== Geography ==
Felton is located at 39°51′17″N 76°33′51″W (39.854751, -76.564245).

According to the United States Census Bureau, the borough has a total area of 0.6 square miles (1.6 km^{2}), all land.

== Demographics ==
Historical population
| Census | Pop. | Note | %± |
|---|---|---|---|
| 1900 | 226 | | — |
| 1910 | 241 | | 6.6% |
| 1920 | 344 | | 42.7% |
| 1930 | 409 | | 18.9% |
| 1940 | 421 | | 2.9% |
| 1950 | 429 | | 1.9% |
| 1960 | 430 | | 0.2% |
| 1970 | 425 | | −1.2% |
| 1980 | 483 | | 13.6% |
| 1990 | 438 | | −9.3% |
| 2000 | 449 | | 2.5% |
| 2010 | 506 | | 12.7% |
| 2020 | 501 | | −1.0% |
| 2023 (est.) | 509 | ▲ | 1.6% |

As of the census of 2000, there were 449 people, 173 households, and 131 families living in the borough. The population density was 688.4 inhabitants per square mile (265.8/km^{2}). There were 182 housing units at an average density of 279.1 units per square mile (107.8 units/km^{2}). The racial makeup of the borough was 98.44% White, 0.45% African American, 0.45% Asian, 0.67% from other races.

There were 173 households, out of which 31.2% had children under the age of 18 living with them, 68.8% were married couples living together, 5.8% had a female householder with no husband present, and 23.7% were non-families. 18.5% of all households were made up of individuals, and 5.8% had someone living alone who was 65 years of age or older. The average household size was 2.60 and the average family size was 2.98.

In the borough the population was spread out, with 21.2% under the age of 18, 9.6% from 18 to 24, 31.4% from 25 to 44, 26.7% from 45 to 64, and 11.1% who were 65 years of age or older. The median age was 40 years. For every 100 females there were 104.1 males. For every 100 females age 18 and over, there were 100.0 males.

The median income for a household in the borough was $42,353, and the median income for a family was $53,125. Males had a median income of $36,607 versus $22,679 for females. The per capita income for the borough was $19,322. About 4.1% of families and 5.7% of the population were below the poverty line, including 12.5% of those under age 18 and 6.6% of those age 65 or over.

== Notable people ==
- Mitch Macek, quarterfinalist in the 2022 Jeopardy! National College Championship
