= Pennsylvania Route 297 =

State highway in York County, Pennsylvania, US

Pennsylvania Route 297

Route information
- Maintained by PennDOT and Conewago Township
- Length: 6.287 mi (10.118 km)
- Existed: 2018–present

Major junctions
- South end: PA 921 in Conewago Township
- I-83 in Conewago Township; PA 382 in Newberry Township
- North end: PA 262 near York Haven

Location
- Country: United States
- State: Pennsylvania
- Counties: York

Highway system
- Pennsylvania State Route System; Interstate; US; State; Scenic; Legislative
← PA 296	→ PA 299
← I-295	PA 295	→ PA 296

Pennsylvania Route 297 (PA 297) is a 6-mile-long (9.7 km) state highway located in York County, Pennsylvania. The southern terminus is at PA 921 in Zions View. The northern terminus is at PA 262 in Cly. PA 297 is a two-lane undivided road in the northern section of York County. The route heads north along Susquehanna Trail a short distance to the west of Interstate 83 (I-83) before reaching an interchange with the highway and heading to the east of it. PA 297 turns northeast in Strinestown and crosses PA 382 before it comes to its northern terminus.

The portion of PA 297 along the Susquehanna Trail became a part of the namesake auto trail in 1920. The Susquehanna Trail was designated as PA 4 in 1924 and also as U.S. Route 111 (US 111) in 1926; the PA 4 designation was removed from US 111 in 1928. The section of the present route north of Strinestown was paved in the 1930s. US 111 was moved off the Susquehanna Trail and onto I-83 in the 1950s. The current alignment of the route was designated PA 295 in 1961. In December 2018, the route was redesignated PA 297 in response to the extension of I-295 into Pennsylvania.

== Route description ==
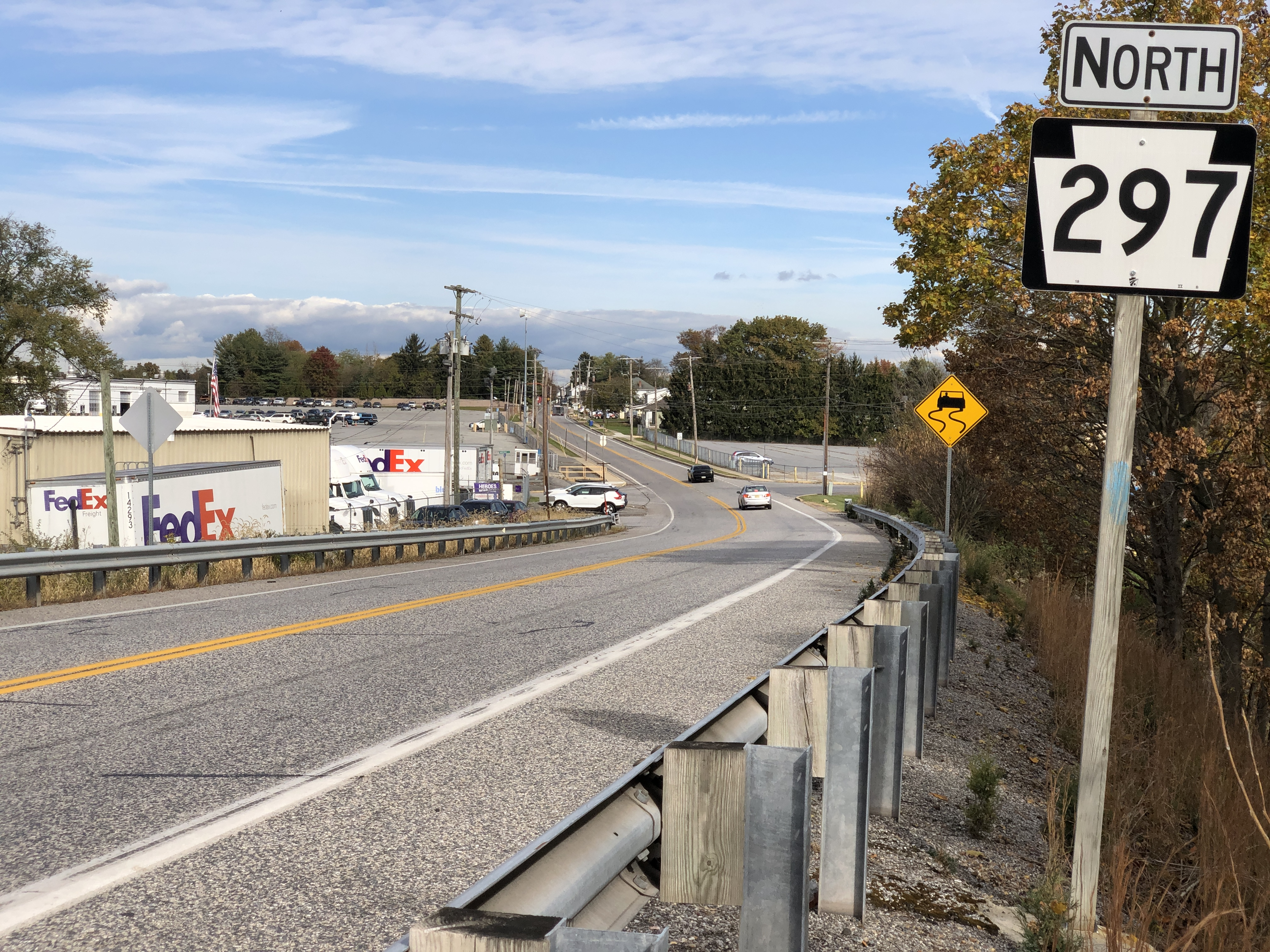
PA 297 northbound past I-83 in Conewago Township

PA 297 begins at an intersection with PA 921 in the community of Zions View in Conewago Township, heading north on the township-maintained two-lane undivided Susquehanna Trail. The road passes through rural residential areas before heading through a mix of farmland and homes. The route crosses Poplar Run, becomes state-maintained, and passes businesses as it comes to an interchange with I-83. From here, PA 297 passes residences in the community of Strinestown before running through a mix of woods and homes. The road turns northwest to descend a wooded bluff overlooking the Conewago Creek, crossing the creek into Newberry Township. Immediately after the creek, the route turns east onto Cragmoor Road, curving to the northeast a short distance later. PA 297 passes a few homes before running through a patch of farmland. The road enters forested areas with residences as it continues to the community of Pleasant Grove. Here, the route turns northwest onto Pleasant Grove Road briefly, passing industrial buildings before turning northeast onto Reesers Hill Road and reaching an intersection with PA 382. After this, PA 297 descends a wooded bluff with some homes and comes to its northern terminus at PA 262 in the community of Cly on the Susquehanna River.

== History ==
Pennsylvania Route 295
- Location: Conewago Township — York Haven
- Length: 6.287 mi (10.118 km)
- Existed: 1961–2018

When Pennsylvania legislated routes in 1911, the portion of present-day PA 297 along Susquehanna Trail and Old Trail Road was designated as part of Legislative Route 250, which ran between York and the Harrisburg area. In 1920, this section of road became part of the Susquehanna Trail, an auto trail running between Baltimore and Williamsport, Pennsylvania. The Susquehanna Trail was designated as PA 4 in 1924. With the creation of the U.S. Highway System in 1926, US 111 became concurrent with PA 4 on the Susquehanna Trail, which was paved. By 1926, Cragmoor Road, Pleasant Grove Road, and Reesers Hill Road were unnumbered, unpaved roads. The concurrent PA 4 designation was removed from US 111 in 1928. The section of present-day PA 297 north of US 111 in Strinestown was paved in the 1930s. US 111 was realigned off Susquehanna Trail and Old Trail Road onto I-83 in the 1950s. PA 295 was designated in 1961 to run along the present alignment of the route from PA 921 in Zions View north to PA 262 in Cly in order to provide a numbered route at the interchange with I-83. Also around this time, the road's jurisdiction south of Poplar Run in Conewego Township was transferred to the township.

In August 2018, the route's internal designation was updated from SR 0295 to SR 0297 in response to the extension of I-295 into Bucks County, because the same internal designation cannot be used for two separate routes in Pennsylvania. PennDOT announced on November 30, 2018 that the change would be expanded to the posted route number. Roadside route markers were replaced the following week, with replacement of route shields on I-83 guide signs expected to be completed later under a separate construction contract.

== Major intersections ==
The entire route is in York County.

Location	mi	km	Destinations	Notes
Conewago Township	0.000	0.000	PA 921 (Canal Road)	Southern terminus
Conewago Township	2.520	4.056	I-83 – York, Harrisburg	I-83 exit 28
Newberry Township	5.880	9.463	PA 382 (York Haven Road) – Newberrytown, York Haven	
Newberry Township	6.287	10.118	PA 262 (Cly Road) – Goldsboro, York Haven	Northern terminus
1.000 mi = 1.609 km; 1.000 km = 0.621 mi
