= Pennsylvania Route 177 =

State highway in York County, Pennsylvania, US

Pennsylvania Route 177

Route information
- Maintained by PennDOT
- Length: 9.569 mi (15.400 km)
- Existed: 1961–present

Major junctions
- South end: PA 74 in Rossville
- PA 382 in Lewisberry; PA 392 in Newberry Township; I-83 in Fairview Township
- North end: PA 262 in Fairview Township

Location
- Country: United States
- State: Pennsylvania
- Counties: York

Highway system
- Pennsylvania State Route System; Interstate; US; State; Scenic; Legislative
← PA 176	→ I-178

Pennsylvania Route 177 (PA 177) is a 9.6-mile-long (15.4 km) state highway located in York County, Pennsylvania. The southern terminus is an intersection with PA 74 and Township Route 4026 (Old York Road) in Rossville. From this intersection, PA 177 bisects the southwestern portion of Pinchot Lake and continues along the northwestern side of Gifford Pinchot State Park. Just south of Lewisberry, PA 177 intersects PA 382 and marks the northern terminus of PA 392 to the north of town. The northern terminus is at PA 262 between Yocumtown and Frogtown, just after an interchange with Interstate 83 (I-83).

The northernmost portion of what would become PA 177 along Old York Road became part of the Susquehanna Trail in 1920, PA 4 in 1924, and U.S. Route 111 (US 111) in 1926. PA 4 was removed from the road in 1928 and US 111 was realigned off it in the 1950s. The section between PA 74 and present-day PA 392 was paved in the 1930s while the section north of there was paved in the 1940s. PA 177 was designated to run between PA 74 and PA 262 in 1961. PA 177 previously followed Old York Road north to intersect PA 262; this section was removed in 2011 following a realignment of the intersection with PA 262.

A Gravity Hill exists on Pleasantview Road at its intersection with Pennsylvania Route 177.

== Route description ==
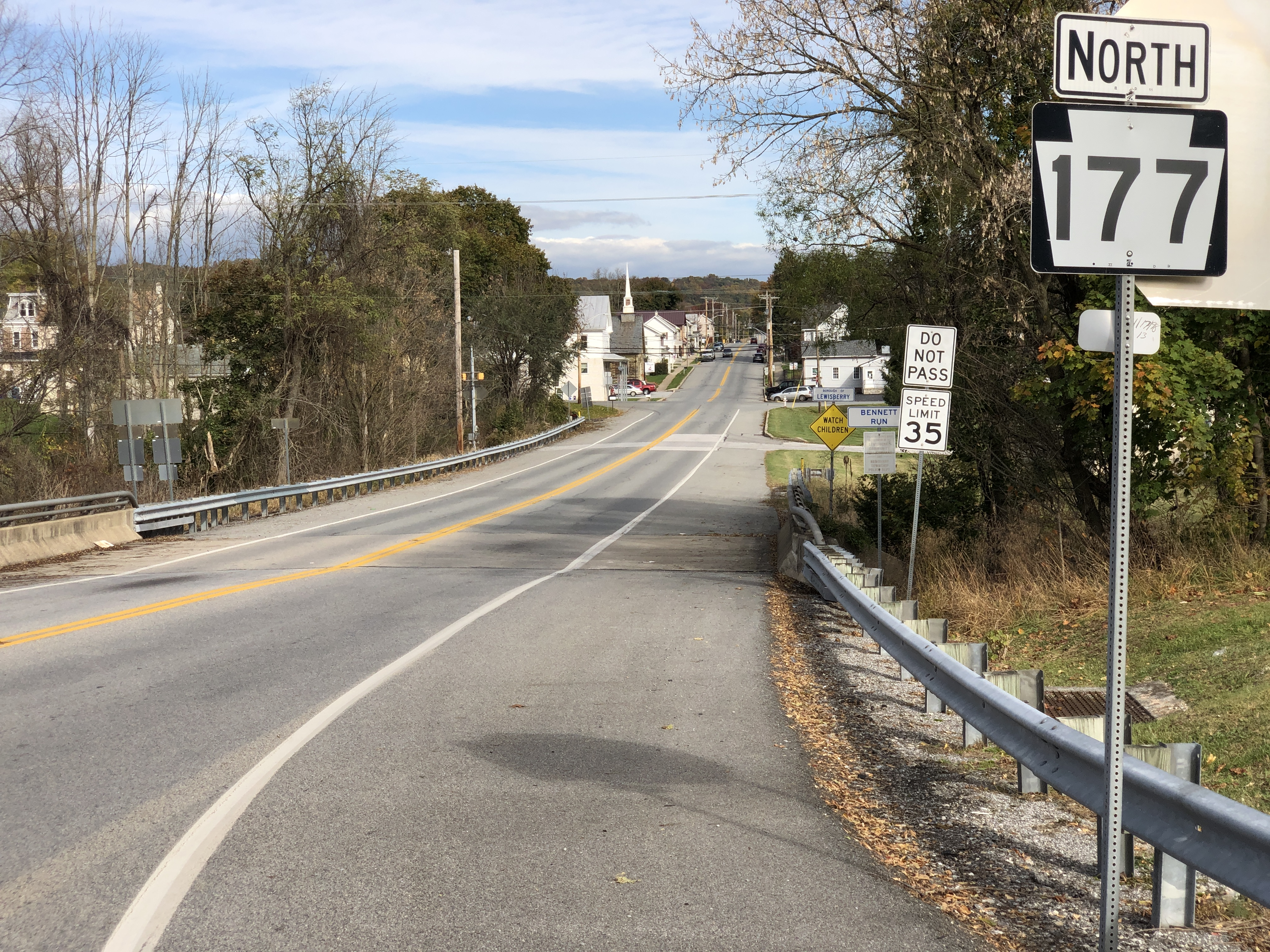
PA 177 northbound past PA 382 in Lewisberry

PA 177 begins at an intersection with PA 74 in the community of Rossville in Warrington Township, heading northeast on two-lane undivided Rosstown Road. The road passes through wooded areas with some homes before entering forested areas of Gifford Pinchot State Park and crossing a portion of Pinchot Lake. The route continues to form the northwestern boundary of the state park, passing a few homes and fields. Upon reaching Maytown, PA 177 leaves the state park and turns north through more hilly forests. The road crosses the Stony Run and becomes the border between Fairview Township to the west and Newberry Township to the east, passing through a mix of farms and woods with a few homes. Upon crossing PA 382, the route enters the borough of Lewisberry and becomes Market Street as it is lined with homes. After leaving Lewisberry, PA 177 continues northeast into Newberry Township and becomes Potts Hill Road as it passes through farmland with some residences. The road ascends a forested hill as it becomes the border between Fairview Township and Newberry Township again.

Upon intersecting PA 392, Potts Hill Road turns east to follow that route and PA 177 continues north on Wyndamere Road. The route descends the hill into a mix of farms and homes, with the road fully entering Fairview Township. The road passes a mix of homes and businesses as it comes to an interchange with I-83. Past here, the PA 177 passes more residences before ending at PA 262 a short distance later.

== History ==
When Pennsylvania legislated routes in 1911, what would become PA 177 was not given a number except for the northernmost part along Old York Road, which was designated as part of Legislative Route 250. In 1920, the Old York Road became part of the Susquehanna Trail, an auto trail running between Baltimore and Williamsport, Pennsylvania. Old York Road was designated as PA 4 in 1924. With the creation of the U.S. Highway System in 1926, US 111 became concurrent with PA 4 on Old York Road, which was paved. By 1926, the current alignment of PA 177 southwest of Old York Road was an unnumbered, unpaved road, with a small portion northeast of present-day PA 74 paved. The concurrent PA 4 designation was removed from US 111 in 1928. The road between PA 74 and Potts Hill Road northeast of Lewisberry was paved in the 1930s. The road between Potts Hill Road and US 111 was paved in the 1940s. In the 1950s, US 111 was realigned off Old York Road onto I-83. PA 177 was designated in 1961 to run from PA 74 in Rossville northeast to PA 262 in order to provide a numbered route at the interchange with I-83. PA 177 formerly turned left onto Old York Road and traveled a short distance northwest to an intersection with PA 262; this segment was eliminated when the PA 262 intersection was realigned in 2011.

== Major intersections ==
The entire route is in York County.

Location	mi	km	Destinations	Notes
Warrington Township	0.000	0.000	PA 74 (Carlisle Road) – Wellsville, York	Southern terminus
Lewisberry	6.057	9.748	PA 382 (Lewisberry Road) to I-83 – Lisburn, Newberrytown	
Newberry Township	7.873	12.670	PA 392 east (Potts Hill Road)	Western terminus of PA 392
Fairview Township	9.184	14.780	I-83 – Harrisburg, York	Exit 35 (I-83)
Fairview Township	9.569	15.400	PA 262 (Old York Road / Valley Road) – Goldsboro	Northern terminus
1.000 mi = 1.609 km; 1.000 km = 0.621 mi

== See also ==
- List of gravity hills
