= Pennsylvania Route 382 =

State highway in York County, Pennsylvania, US

Pennsylvania Route 382

Route information
- Maintained by PennDOT
- Length: 11.786 mi (18.968 km)
- Existed: 1961–present

Major junctions
- South end: PA 181 in York Haven
- PA 262 in Newberry Township; PA 297 in Newberry Township; I-83 in Newberry Township; PA 177 in Lewisberry
- North end: PA 114 near Bunches

Location
- Country: United States
- State: Pennsylvania
- Counties: York

Highway system
- Pennsylvania State Route System; Interstate; US; State; Scenic; Legislative
← PA 381	→ PA 383

Pennsylvania Route 382 (PA 382) is an 11.8-mile-long (19.0 km) state highway located in York County, Pennsylvania. The southern terminus is at PA 181 in York Haven. The western terminus is at PA 114 near Bunches in Fairview Township. PA 382 is a two-lane undivided road that runs through rural areas in the northern part of York County. The route heads west from York Haven, intersecting PA 262 and PA 297. Farther west, the road has an interchange with Interstate 83 (I-83) in Newberrytown and an intersection with PA 177 in Lewisberry. From here, PA 382 turns north and continues to its terminus at PA 114. What is now PA 382 was designated as a portion of PA 24 in 1928. PA 382 was designated to its current alignment in 1961 after the northern terminus of PA 24 was truncated to the York area.

== Route description ==
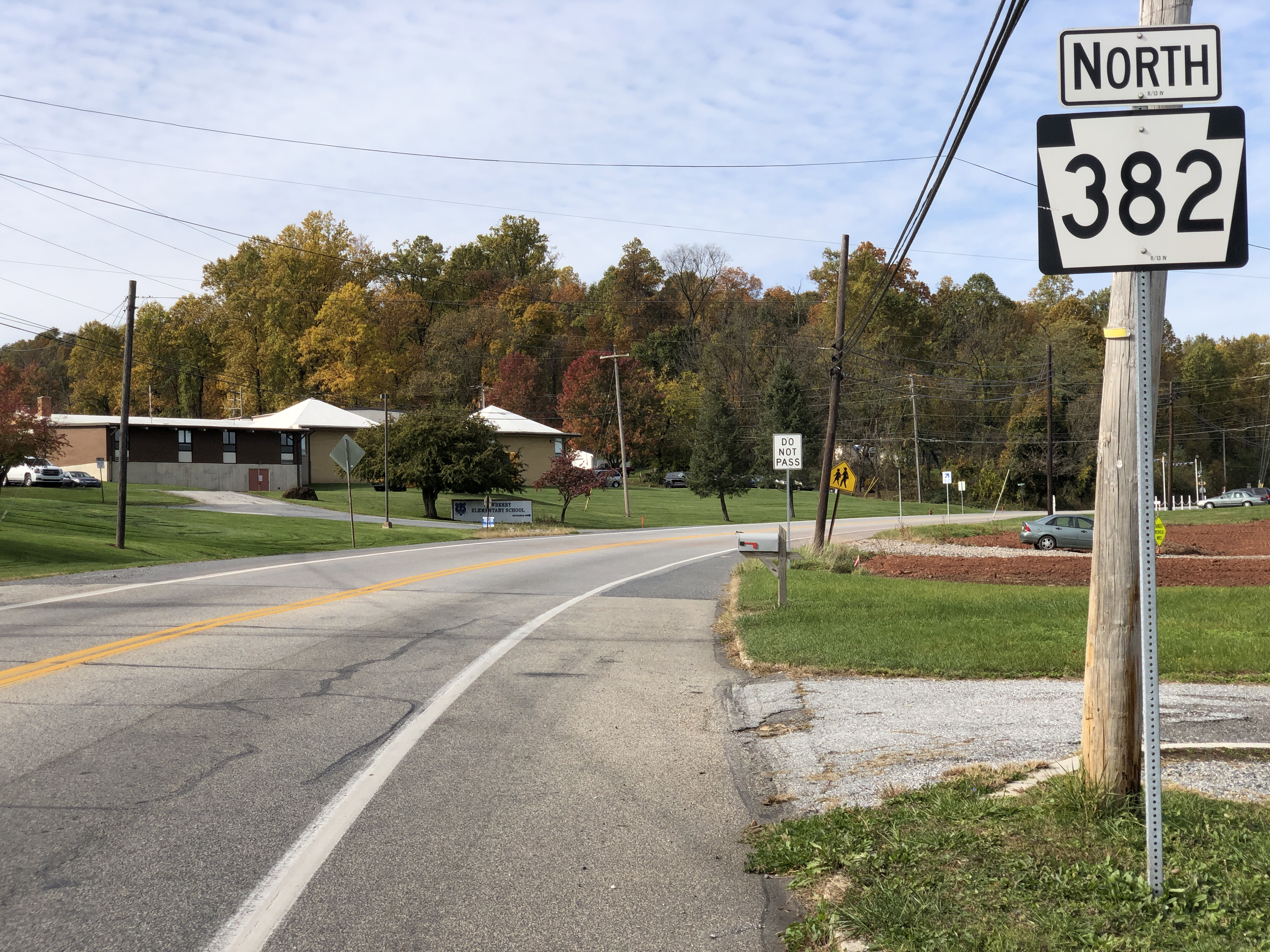
PA 382 northbound past I-83 in Newberry Township

PA 382 begins at an intersection with the northern terminus of PA 181 in the borough of York Haven, heading southwest on two-lane undivided Landvale Street through residential areas. The route curves northwest, leaving York Haven for Newberry Township. The road becomes York Haven Road and runs through forested areas with some homes, intersecting PA 262 before crossing PA 297 in the community of Pleasant Grove a short distance later. PA 382 runs through a patch of farmland before it continues past rural areas of residences, running through the community of Newberrytown and coming to an interchange with I-83.

Past this interchange, the route becomes Lewisberry Road and runs through wooded areas with a few homes before passing through agricultural areas, heading west. The road curves northwest and becomes the border between the borough of Lewisberry to the northeast and Newberry Township to the southwest, intersecting PA 177. PA 382 passes rural areas of residences and enters Fairview Township. The route runs through more farmland and woodland and turns to the north. The road heads through a mix of farms, woods, and homes, passing through the community of Nauvoo. PA 382 continues north through forested areas and reaches its northern terminus at PA 114.

== History ==
When Pennsylvania first legislated routes in 1911, what is now PA 382 was designated as part of Legislative Route 250, which ran between York and the Harrisburg area. In 1928, the road between York Haven and PA 114 was designated as part of PA 24, a route which ran from the Maryland border north to New Cumberland. This portion of PA 24 was a paved road. In 1961, the northern terminus of PA 24 was cut back to east of York, and PA 382 was designated onto the former alignment of PA 24 between PA 181 in York Haven and PA 114. This change was made as part of the construction of I-83 in order to provide a numbered route at each interchange.

== Major intersections ==
The entire route is in York County.

Location	mi	km	Destinations	Notes
York Haven	0.000	0.000	PA 181 south (Pennsylvania Avenue) – Manchester	Southern terminus; northern terminus of PA 181
Newberry Township	1.281	2.062	PA 262 west (Cly Road) – Cly, Goldsboro	Eastern terminus of PA 262
Newberry Township	1.793	2.886	PA 297 (Reesers Hill Road) – Cly, Strinestown	
Newberry Township	4.754	7.651	I-83 – York, Harrisburg	Exit 32 (I-83)
Lewisberry	8.424	13.557	PA 177 (Rosstown Road / Market Street) – Rossville, Lewisberry	
Fairview Township	11.786	18.968	PA 114 (Cedars Road / Lisburn Road) – New Cumberland	Northern terminus
1.000 mi = 1.609 km; 1.000 km = 0.621 mi
