= Pennsylvania Route 392 =

State highway in York County, Pennsylvania, US

Pennsylvania Route 392

Route information
- Maintained by PennDOT
- Length: 5.168 mi (8.317 km)
- Existed: 1961–present

Major junctions
- West end: PA 177 near Lewisberry
- I-83 in Newberry Township
- East end: PA 262 near Goldsboro

Location
- Country: United States
- State: Pennsylvania
- Counties: York

Highway system
- Pennsylvania State Route System; Interstate; US; State; Scenic; Legislative
← PA 391	→ PA 393

Pennsylvania Route 392 (PA 392) is a 5.16-mile-long (8.30 km) state highway located in York County, Pennsylvania. The western terminus is at PA 177 near Lewisberry. The eastern terminus is at PA 262 near Goldsboro. PA 392 is a two-lane undivided road that runs through rural areas in northern York County. The route heads east and curves south before turning north to come to an interchange with Interstate 83 (I-83). PA 392 curves back east and passes through Yocumtown before reaching its terminus.

The section of present-day PA 392 along Old Trail Road became part of the Susquehanna Trail in 1920, PA 4 in 1924, and U.S. Route 111 (US 111) in 1926. PA 4 was removed from US 111 in 1928. Potts Hill Road and Yocumtown Road were paved in the 1930s. In the 1950s, US 111 was realigned off Old Trail Road onto I-83 and Potts Hill Road was realigned to head south to Old Trail Road. PA 392 was designated to its current alignment in 1961.

== Route description ==
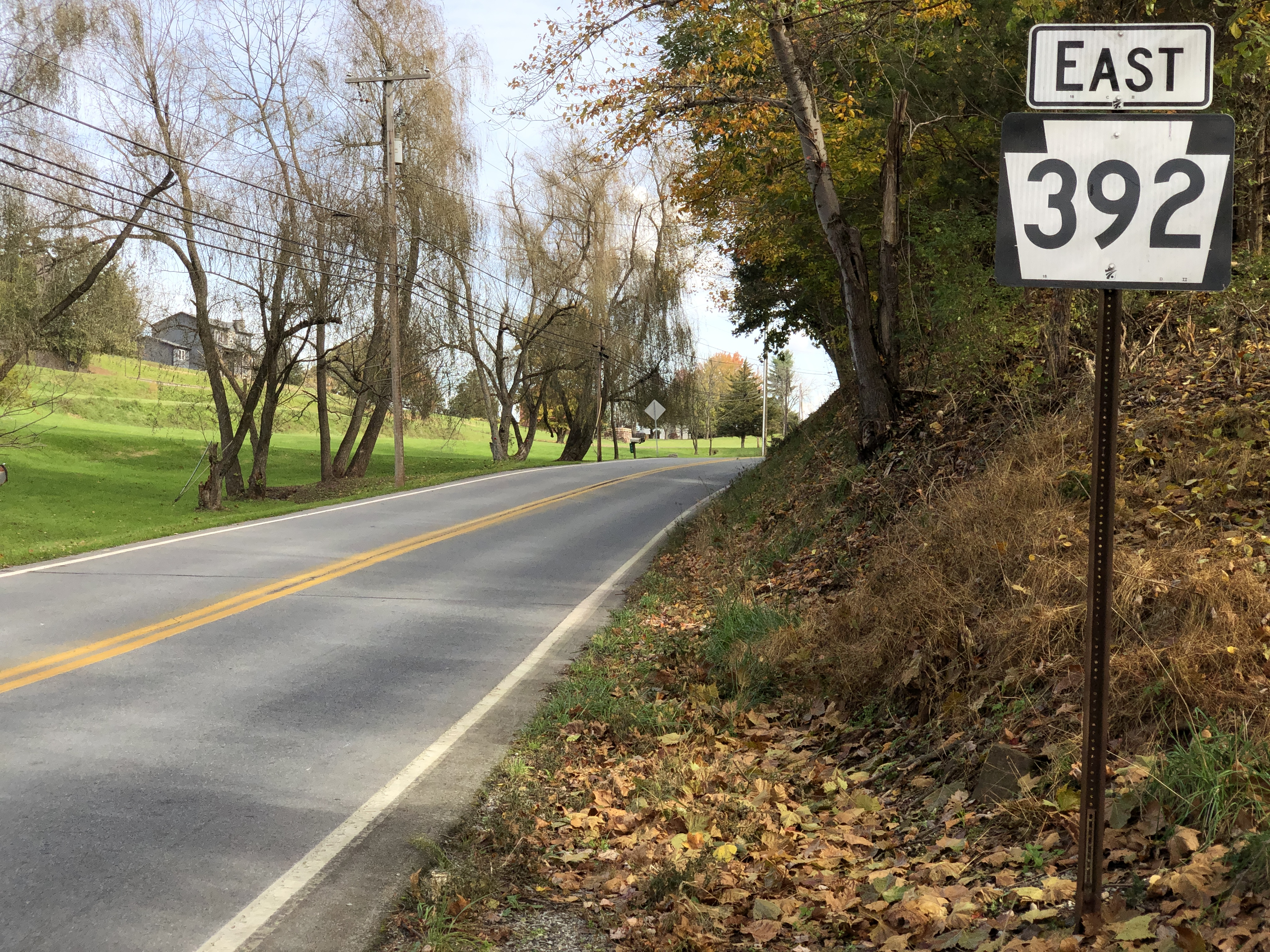
PA 392 eastbound in Newberry Township

PA 392 begins at an intersection with PA 177 in Newberry Township, heading east on two-lane undivided Potts Hill Road. The road winds east along a forested hill, passing a few homes. The route curves to the southeast and runs a short distance to the west of I-83. PA 392 turns north onto Old Trail Road and immediately interchanges with I-83 before heading north between a park and ride lot to the west and businesses to the east. The road continues into a mix of woods and development. The route turns east onto Yocumtown Road and passes housing developments in Yocumtown. Farther northeast, PA 392 runs through a mix of agriculture and homes with some woods before heading east into open farmland and ending at PA 262 in the community of Plainfield.

== History ==
When Pennsylvania legislated routes in 1911, the portion of present-day PA 392 along Old Trail Road became part of Legislative Route 250, which ran between York and the Harrisburg area. In 1920, this section of road became part of the Susquehanna Trail, an auto trail running between Baltimore and Williamsport, Pennsylvania. The Susquehanna Trail was designated as PA 4 in 1924. With the creation of the U.S. Highway System in 1926, US 111 became concurrent with PA 4 on the Susquehanna Trail, which was paved. By 1926, Potts Hill Road and Yocumtown Road were unnumbered, unpaved roads. The concurrent PA 4 designation was removed from US 111 in 1928. Potts Hill Road and Yocumtown Road were both paved in the 1930s. US 111 was realigned off Old Trail Road to the parallel I-83 to the west in the 1950s while Potts Hill Road was realigned to head south and intersect Old Trail Road. PA 392 was designated in 1961 to run along its current alignment between PA 177 and PA 262 in order to provide a numbered route at the interchange with I-83 southwest of Yocumtown.

== Major intersections ==
The entire route is in Newberry Township, York County.

mi	km	Destinations	Notes
0.000	0.000	PA 177 (Potts Hill Road/Wyndamere Road) to I-83 – Lewisberry	Western terminus
1.577	2.538	I-83 – York, Harrisburg	Exit 33 (I-83)
5.168	8.317	PA 262 (Valley Road) – Goldsboro	Eastern terminus
1.000 mi = 1.609 km; 1.000 km = 0.621 mi
