= Pennsylvania Route 262 =

State highway in York County, Pennsylvania, US

Pennsylvania Route 262

Route information
- Maintained by PennDOT
- Length: 11.993 mi (19.301 km)
- Existed: 1961–present

Major junctions
- West end: PA 114 in Fairview Township
- I-83 in Fairview Township; PA 177 in Fairview Township; PA 392 near Goldsboro; PA 297 near York Haven
- East end: PA 382 near York Haven

Location
- Country: United States
- State: Pennsylvania
- Counties: York

Highway system
- Pennsylvania State Route System; Interstate; US; State; Scenic; Legislative
← PA 261	→ PA 263
← PA 919	PA 920	→ PA 921

Pennsylvania Route 262 (PA 262) is an 11.9-mile-long (19.2 km) state highway located in York County, Pennsylvania. The western terminus is at PA 114 in Fairview Township. The eastern terminus is at PA 382 near York Haven. PA 262 is a two-lane undivided road that passes through the rural northern portion of York County. The route heads east from PA 114 and comes to an interchange with Interstate 83 (I-83) in Fairview Township. A short distance later, PA 262 intersects PA 177 before turning south along the west bank of the Susquehanna River and reaching PA 392. The route passes through Goldsboro and intersects PA 297 in Cly before coming to its terminus.

In 1928, the paved road between PA 24 (now PA 382) south of Cly and Goldsboro was designated as PA 920. The portion of the current route west of Goldsboro was paved in the 1930s. The PA 920 designation was removed in the 1940s. PA 262 was designated to its present course in 1961. The route was realigned at the PA 177 intersection in 2011.

== Route description ==
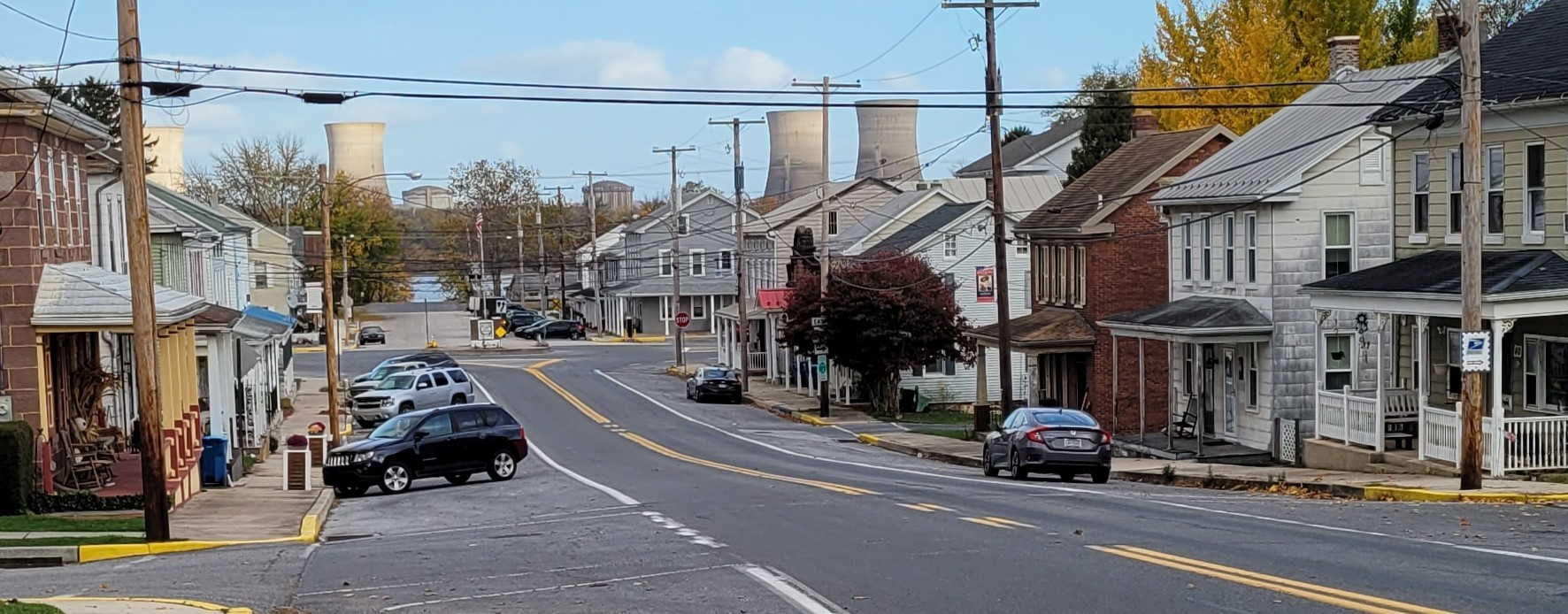
PA 262 eastbound in Goldsboro in 2022, with the Three Mile Island Nuclear Generating Station in the background

PA 262 begins at an intersection with PA 114 in the community of Bunches in Fairview Township, heading southeast on two-lane undivided Fishing Creek Road. The route heads through wooded areas of homes and makes a hairpin turn to the northwest to ascend a hill. The road makes a sharp turn to the east and descends the hill, passing homes in the communities of Springville and Frogtown. Farther east, PA 262 enters commercial areas and reaches an interchange with I-83. Past here, the route turns southeast and merges onto Old York Road. PA 262 continues past more homes and businesses before intersecting PA 177, at which point that route continues along Old York Road and PA 262 turns east onto Valley Road. The road heads into a mix of farms and housing developments, eventually becoming the border between Fairview Township to the north and Newberry Township to the south, entering open farmland. After fully entering Newberry Township, the route makes a sharp turn to the south and intersects the eastern terminus of PA 392 in the community of Plainfield. PA 262 passes more agricultural areas before passing near a housing subdivision and becoming the border between Newberry Township to the west and the borough of Goldsboro to the east.

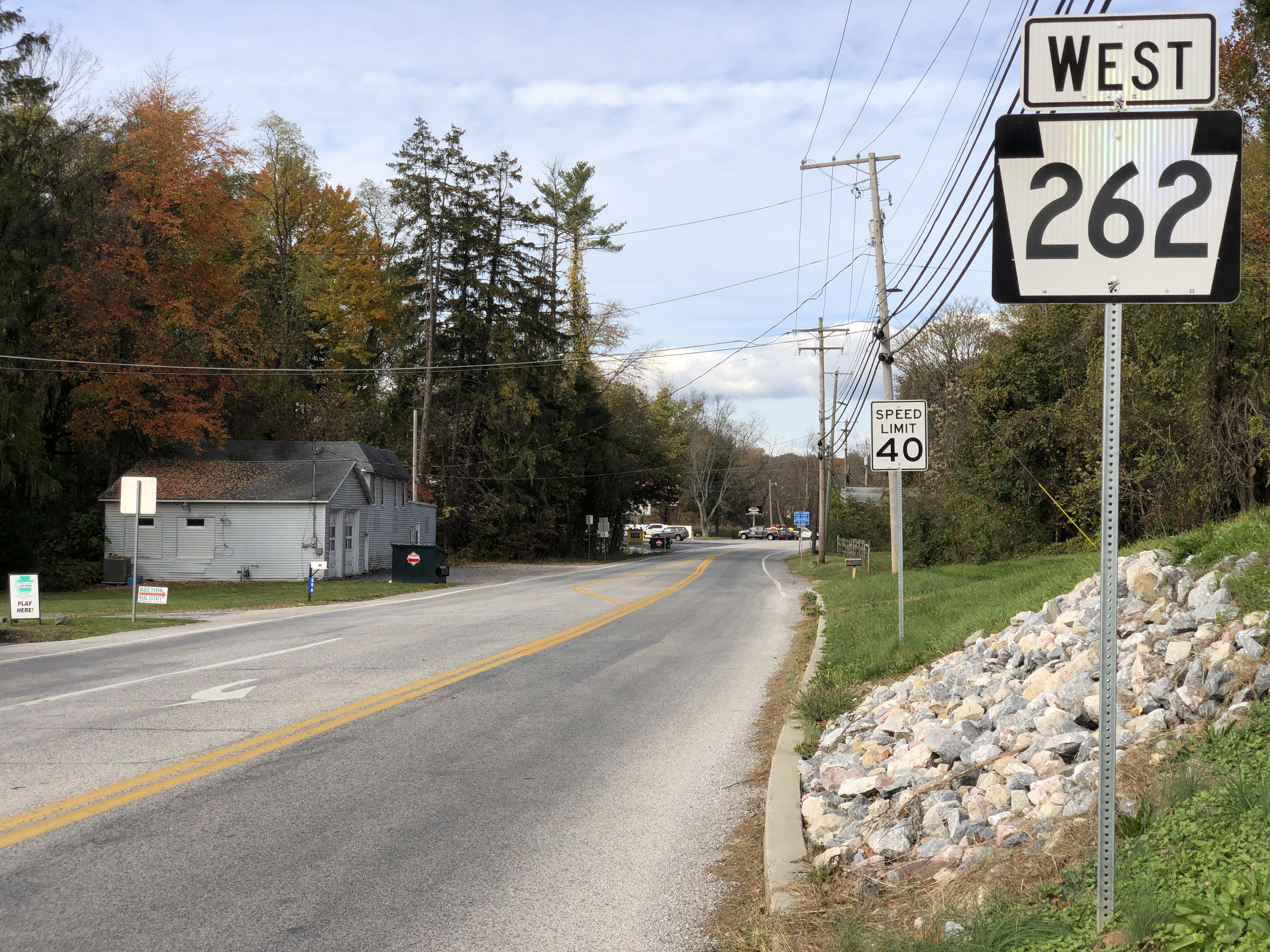
PA 262 westbound past PA 177 in Fairview Township

The route turns to the east to descend a hill and fully enters Goldsboro, becoming Broadway Avenue as it is lined with homes. At the town square, PA 262 turns south onto York Street and passes more residences. The road leaves Goldsboro for Newberry Township again and becomes Cly Road as it continues through a mix of woods and homes. The route turns southeast through forests and parallels Norfolk Southern's Port Road Branch railroad line along the Susquehanna River, reaching a junction with the northern terminus of PA 297 in the residential community of Cly. From here, PA 262 turns south away from the railroad line and river, passing forested areas of homes as it comes to its terminus at PA 382.

== History ==
Pennsylvania Route 920
- Location: Cly – Goldsboro
- Existed: 1928–1940s

When Pennsylvania legislated routes in 1911, what is now PA 262 was not given a number. By 1926, the current route was an unnumbered, unpaved road. In 1928, PA 920 was designated to run from PA 24 (now PA 382) south of Cly north to Goldsboro as a paved road. The unnumbered road between Goldsboro and PA 24 (now PA 114) in Bunches was paved in the 1930s. The PA 920 designation was decommissioned in the 1940s, leaving the road between Cly and Goldsboro unnumbered. PA 262 was designated in 1961 to its current alignment between PA 114 in Bunches and PA 382 south of Cly in order to provide a numbered route at the interchange with I-83. In 2011, PA 262 was realigned at the PA 177 intersection, with traffic signals installed.

== Major intersections ==
The entire route is in York County.

Location	mi	km	Destinations	Notes
Fairview Township	0.000	0.000	PA 114 (Lewisberry Road)	Western terminus
Fairview Township	2.963	4.768	I-83 – Harrisburg, York	Exit 36 (I-83)
Fairview Township	3.703	5.959	PA 177 south (Wyndamere Road) to I-83	
Newberry Township	7.582	12.202	PA 392 west (Yocumtown Road)	Eastern terminus of PA 392
Newberry Township	11.393	18.335	PA 297 south (Reesers Hill Road)	Northern terminus of PA 297
Newberry Township	11.993	19.301	PA 382 (York Haven Road) – York Haven, Newberrytown, Harrisburg	Eastern terminus
1.000 mi = 1.609 km; 1.000 km = 0.621 mi
