= U.S. Route 111 =

Former highway in the United States

U.S. Route 111
- US 111 highlighted on a modern map

Route information
- Auxiliary route of US 11
- Existed: 1926–1963

Major junctions
- South end: US 1 in Baltimore, MD
- I-695 near Timonium, MD; US 30 in York, PA
- North end: US 11 / US 15 in Lemoyne, PA

Location
- Country: United States
- States: Maryland, Pennsylvania
- Counties: MD: City of Baltimore, Baltimore; PA: York, Cumberland

Highway system
- United States Numbered Highway System; List; Special; Divided
← MD 110	MD	→ MD 112
← PA 110	PA	→ PA 112

U.S. Route 111 (US 111) was a U.S. Highway that extended from Baltimore, Maryland north to the Harrisburg, Pennsylvania area. It replaced part of the Susquehanna Trail, partially signed as Pennsylvania Route 4, and was in turn replaced by Interstate 83 (I-83). Portions of its pre-freeway alignment are now Maryland Route 45 and I-83 Business (I-83 Bus.). Other old sections in Pennsylvania are now unsigned Quadrant Routes or township-maintained roads. US 111 extended north to the Pennsylvania–New York state line where U.S. Route 15 now crosses it between 1928 and 1937.

== Route description ==
This route description features US 111 as it existed in 1945, with references to today's highways to provide context.

=== Maryland ===
The Maryland portion of US 111 followed the entire length of what is now MD 45 from Baltimore to Maryland Line. The highway began at US 1 (North Avenue) and followed Greenmount Avenue north to 42nd Street, where the highway's name became York Road through the rest of Baltimore and all of Baltimore County. US 111 left Baltimore and continued to Towson, where the highway entered downtown by passing under the Maryland and Pennsylvania Railroad at the modern MD 45–Towsontown Boulevard intersection. In the center of the county seat, where Towson Circle now sits, the U.S. Highway intersected the southern end of the original MD 144 (Dulaney Valley Road), which is now MD 146; the western end of MD 148 (Joppa Road); and the eastern end of MD 141 (Allegany Avenue).

US 111 continued north through Lutherville, where the route met the eastern end of MD 131 (Seminary Avenue), and Timonium. In Cockeysville, the highway met the western end of MD 143 (Warren Road) and passed under the Northern Central Railway at an oblique angle, but did not intersect MD 145 (Ashland Road), which did not yet extend west of Loch Raven Reservoir. US 111 passed through Hereford, where the highway met MD 137 (Mount Carmel Road) and MD 138 (Monkton Road), before crossing Gunpowder Falls and meeting the west end of MD 142 (Wiseburg Road). The U.S. Highway passed through Parkton, where the highway followed its present course over the Northern Central Railway, which is now the Torrey C. Brown Rail Trail. US 111 entered Maryland Line at its acute intersection with MD 439 (Old York Road). The U.S. highway met the eastern end of MD 409 (Freeland Road) before crossing the Mason–Dixon Line into Pennsylvania.

=== Pennsylvania ===
US 111 continued north from the state line along what is now SR 3001 (Susquehanna Trail) all the way to the city limits of York. The highway intersected the Stewartstown Branch of the Northern Central Railway and became Main Street through the borough of Shrewsbury, where the highway intersected PA 851 (Forrest Avenue). US 111 continued north and met the eastern end of PA 216 (Glen Rock Road) northeast of Glen Rock. The U.S. Highway continued through Loganville and Jacobus, following Main Street through both boroughs. US 111 crossed the East Branch of Codorus Creek, ascended to the village of Leader Heights, and entered the city of York next to the York Hospital just north of where I-83 Business now intersects Susquehanna Trail. The U.S. Highway continued along what is now I-83 Business (South George Street) into downtown York. At the central square, US 111 intersected Market Street, which carried US 30, PA 24, and PA 74.

US 111 continued along North George Street concurrent with PA 24. The two highways intersected the Northern Central Railway just before they crossed Codorus Creek. Just north of the creek, US 111 and PA 24 left the city of York and passed through the borough of North York along what is both I-83 Business and SR 3065. Just after leaving the borough, US 111 and PA 24 separated at what is today the intersection of US 30 and PA 181. PA 24 continued north along North George Street while US 111 veered northwest along Arsenal Road, then north onto Susquehanna Trail, which is today designated SR 4005. The U.S. Highway followed the modern course of SR 4005 north to modern PA 238 (Church Road), then followed a township road to its intersection with PA 921 (Canal Road) just north of Little Conewago Creek at Zions View.

US 111 continued north along what is now PA 297 (renamed from PA 295 in 2018). The U.S. highway followed the modern state highway except it continued straight where the state highway curves through its interchange with I-83 at Strinestown. US 111 followed modern PA 297 to just north of Conewago Creek, where PA 297 now turns east. The U.S. Highway followed Old Trail Road, which is a township road north to the village of Newberrytown. There, US 111 had an acute intersection with PA 24 (York Haven Road), which is today PA 382. The two highways ran concurrently through Newberrytown as Old Trail Road and split west of the village, with PA 24 continuing along PA 382's modern path on Lewisberry Road and US 111 following Old Trail Road, which is again a township road. Part of the U.S. Highway's course south of the village of Yocumtown was removed by construction of I-83, but resumes along part of PA 392 from Fishing Creek until PA 392 turns east onto Yocumtown Road. US 111 continued along a pair of township roads on either side of the boundary of Newberry Township and Fairview Township, where the highway's name changes to Old York Road. The township road ends at the modern intersection of PA 262 (Valley Road) and PA 177 (Wyndamere Road).

US 111 followed current PA 262 then split northeast from PA 262 (Fishing Creek Road) along present-day SR 1003. The U.S. Highway had a few tight curves as it descended a hill just south of where the road now crosses the Pennsylvania Turnpike. The highway passed to the west of the New Cumberland Defense Depot and what is today Capital City Airport and met the northern end of PA 24 (Lewisberry Road, now PA 114). US 111 passed along the edge of the village of New Market and crossed the York–Cumberland county line at Yellow Breeches Creek. The U.S. Highway followed what is now SR 2035 through the borough of New Cumberland. US 111 left New Cumberland and its name changed to Third Street on entering the borough of Lemoyne south of what is today the street's crossing of I-83, where the U.S. Highway then crossed over the Reading Railroad. US 111 crossed over the Pennsylvania Railroad immediately before reaching its northern terminus at US 11 and US 15 (Market Street), which is today SR 1010.

== History ==
=== Creation and original routing ===
In the preliminary 1925 plan for what were then called "Interstate Highways", US 111 was assigned to the Baltimore-Harrisburg route; it met its "parent" - U.S. Route 11 - at Harrisburg. The changes made by the American Association of State Highway Officials (AASHO) during the next year included the creation of U.S. Route 220 from Cumberland, Maryland north to the New York state line at Lawrenceville. It did not continue into New York due to the insistence of Frederick S. Greene of that state to designate only the most major highways, "thinking that [other states] wanted to justify their great amount of roads by having New York pursue the same ridiculous policy."

However, Pennsylvania soon objected (after the final plan had been approved), on the basis that the U.S. Highways did not follow the existing auto trails. In particular, the Washington-Buffalo Susquehanna Trail had four numbers in Pennsylvania - US 111 to Harrisburg, U.S. Route 11 to Northumberland, U.S. Route 120 to Williamsport, and U.S. Route 220 north to New York, as opposed to the single number - Pennsylvania Route 4 - that had been assigned in 1924. Maryland did not object; US 111 was established in Maryland in 1926, from Baltimore to the Mason–Dixon line. By April 1927, Pennsylvania and AASHO had come to an agreement: US 111 was extended north, concurrent with US 11 and US 120 to Williamsport, where it took over former US 220 to New York. (US 220 itself was rerouted to its current alignment along what had been U.S. Route 711.) The extension took effect in the summer of 1928.

=== Extension to New York ===
US 111 was extended beyond its northern terminus at the Mason–Dixon line to Lemoyne; it ran concurrent with US 11 to Northumberland. The combined US 11 and US 111 crossed the Susquehanna River three times: the Market Street Bridge between Wormleysburg and Harrisburg, the Clarks Ferry Bridge north of Harrisburg, and the Route 11 Bridge over the West Branch Susquehanna River at Northumberland. Between the bridges, US 11 and US 111 used the main roads along the river.

In Northumberland, US 11 and US 111 split at the intersection of Water Street (still US 11) and Duke Street (now Pennsylvania Route 147). U.S. Route 120 also passed through Northimberland on the present alignment of PA 147, running concurrent with US 111 to Williamsport. Along this section, US 111 and US 120 roughly followed the east bank of the West Branch Susquehanna River along PA 147, Pennsylvania Route 405 and a number of Quadrant Routes. However, between Milton and Muncy, the alignment was more inland, fairly close to the present Interstate 180. (Much of this road is still known as Susquehanna Trail.) At Water Street (now PA 405) in Muncy, US 111 and US 120 met U.S. Route 220, which joined the other routes the rest of the way to Williamsport. The three routes passed through Williamsport on Washington Street, Market Street, 7th Street, Hepburn Street and Park Avenue. US 120 and US 220 split at Campbell Street, heading south and then west on 4th Street, while US 111 continued along Park Avenue and High Street. From the end of High Street, US 111 used former and current alignments of U.S. Route 15 the rest of the way to New York. (By 1940, US 111 - by then US 15 - and the other routes through Williamsport had moved to Washington Boulevard, Harris Place, Hepburn Street and High Street, with the split still occurring at Campbell Street.)

=== Truncation and deletion ===

US 111 was truncated back to Lemoyne in 1937, and U.S. Route 15 was extended north from Lemoyne along and parallel to the former US 111 and beyond to Rochester, New York. Soon after 1940, US 15 was rerouted to roughly its present alignment, only crossing the Susquehanna River once - on the Market Street Bridge at Williamsport.

Later changes to US 111 included an extension to Front Street and Walnut Street in Wormleysburg when US 11 was moved to its present alignment, relocations to the new freeway (now I-83) south of Lemoyne, and finally a relocation from Lemoyne over the John Harris Bridge with I-83 to end at U.S. Route 22 in Lower Paxton Township. In 1961, the Pennsylvania Department of Highways announced that the route would be replaced with the I-83 and Business Loop 83. On December 1, 1962, the American Association of State Highway Officials approved the elimination of the US 111 designation. The route was deleted in April 1963, by then completely replaced by I-83, and running along I-83 except inside the Baltimore Beltway (where it used present Maryland Route 45 to the end).

== Junction list ==
This table shows the intersections of US 111 as they existed in 1945.

County	Location	mi	km	Destinations	Notes
Baltimore City				US 1 (North Avenue) / Greenmount Avenue south – Washington, Philadelphia	Southern terminus of US 111
Baltimore	Towson			MD 141 west (Allegany Avenue) / MD 144 north (Dulaney Valley Road) / MD 148 east (Joppa Road) – Brooklandville, Hampton, Parkville	MD 144 is now MD 146
Baltimore	Lutherville			MD 131 west (Seminary Avenue) – Brooklandville	
Baltimore	Cockeysville			MD 143 east (Warren Road) – Jacksonville	
Baltimore	Hereford			MD 138 east (Monkton Road) – Monkton	
Baltimore	Hereford			MD 137 west (Mount Carmel Road) – Hampstead	
Baltimore	Parkton			MD 142 east (Wiseburg Road) – White Hall	
Baltimore	Maryland Line			MD 439 east (Old York Road) – Bel Air	
Baltimore	Maryland Line			MD 409 west (Freeland Road) – Freeland	
Mason–Dixon line				Maryland–Pennsylvania state line	
York	Shrewsbury			PA 851 (Forrest Street) – Railroad, New Freedom, Stewartstown	Intersection of Main Street (SR 3001) and PA 851
York	Springfield Township			PA 216 west (Glen Rock Road) – Glen Rock	Intersection of Susquehanna Trail (SR 3001) and PA 216
York	York			US 30 / PA 24 south / PA 74 (Market Street) – Lancaster, Gettysburg, Carlisle, Red Lion	Intersection of I-83 Business and southbound PA 74 / eastbound PA 462; south end of concurrency with PA 24
York	Manchester Township			PA 24 north (North George Street) – Manchester	Intersection of I-83 Business and 11th Avenue; north end of concurrency with PA 24
York	Newberry Township			PA 24 south (York Haven Road) – York Haven	Intersection of Old Trail Road (TR 686) and PA 382; south end of concurrency with PA 24
York	Newberry Township			PA 24 north (Lewisberry Road) – Lewisberry	Intersection of Old Trail Road (TR 686) and PA 382; north end of concurrency with PA 24
York	Fairview Township			PA 24 south (Lewisberry Road) – Lewisberry	Intersection of Old York Road (SR 1003) and PA 114
Cumberland	Lemoyne			US 11 / US 15 (Market Street) – Harrisburg, Carlisle, Gettysburg	Northern terminus of US 111; intersection of Third Street (SR 2035) and Market Street (SR 1010)
1.000 mi = 1.609 km; 1.000 km = 0.621 mi: Concurrency terminus

== U.S. Route 111 Alternate ==
U.S. Route 111 Alternate
- Location: York, Pennsylvania
- Existed: 1950s–1960s

U.S. Route 111 Alternate (US 111 Alt.) was an alternate route of US 111 that ran through York, Pennsylvania, while US 111 bypassed the city to the east along I-83. US 111 Alt. began at an interchange with I-83/US 111 south of York, heading north as a divided highway. The route narrowed to an undivided road and headed north into York along South George Street. At Jackson Street, US 111 Alt. split into the one-way pair of South Duke Street northbound and South George Street southbound. In the downtown area of York, the route intersected US 30/PA 24/PA 74 at the one-way pair of Market Street eastbound and Philadelphia Street westbound. Here, US 111 Alt. became concurrent with PA 24 as North Duke Street northbound and North George Street southbound. Past North Street, US 111 Alt./PA 24 continued north along two-way North George Street, crossing the Codorus Creek. The two routes headed north out of York and continued to an interchange with I-83/US 111. Here, US 111 Alt. ended while PA 24 continued to the north. US 111 Alt. was designated in the 1950s after US 111 was rerouted to bypass York to the east along I-83. The alternate route ran along the former alignment of US 111 on George Street in York, while the southern portion followed a new highway connecting I-83/US 111 to George Street. US 111 Alt. was decommissioned in the 1960s concurrent with US 111 being decommissioned in favor of I-83; the former alignment of US 111 Alt. was renumbered to I-83 Bus.

Major intersections

The entire route was in York County.

Location	mi	km	Destinations	Notes
York Township			I-83 / US 111 – Harrisburg, Baltimore	Southern terminus
York			US 30 east / PA 24 south / PA 74 south (Market Street)	South end of PA 24 southbound overlap
York			US 30 west / PA 24 north / PA 74 north (Philadelphia Street)	South end of PA 24 northbound overlap
Manchester Township			I-83 / US 111 – Harrisburg, Baltimore PA 24 north (North George Street) – Emigsville	Northern terminus; north end of PA 24 overlap
1.000 mi = 1.609 km; 1.000 km = 0.621 mi: Concurrency terminus
