= Goldsboro Historic District =

Historic district in Pennsylvania, United States

- U.S. National Register of Historic Places
- U.S. Historic district
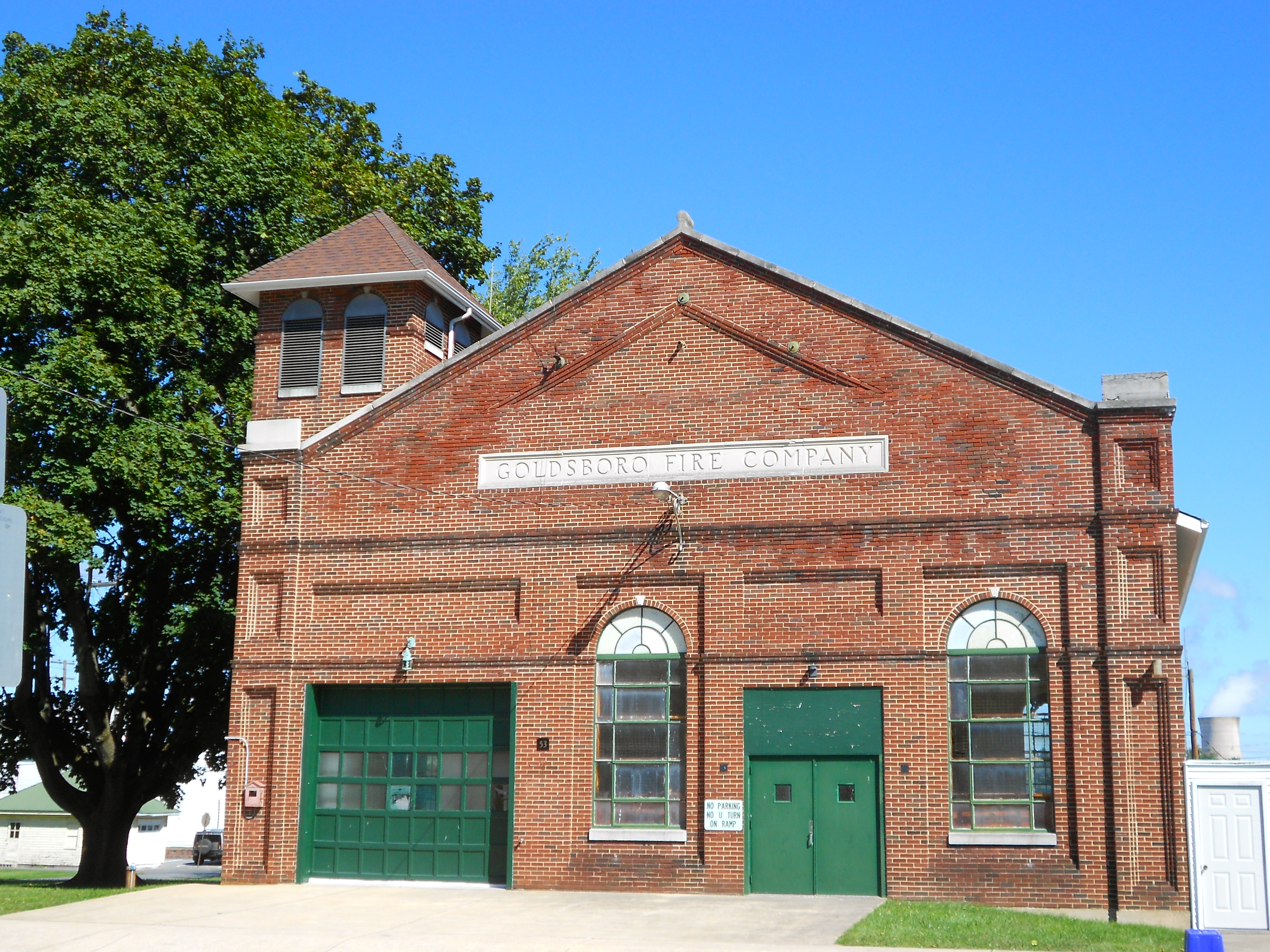
- Fire Department

- Location within Pennsylvania Location within the United States
- Location: Roughly bounded by North, 3rd, Fraser, and Railroad Sts., Goldsboro, Pennsylvania
- Coordinates: 40°09′11″N 76°45′02″W
- Area: 23.2 acres (9.4 ha)
- Architectural style: Greek Revival
- NRHP reference No.: 84003589
- Added to NRHP: June 14, 1984

The Goldsboro Historic District is a national historic district that is located in Goldsboro in York County, Pennsylvania in the United States.

It was listed on the National Register of Historic Places in 1984.

== History and architectural features ==
This district includes seventy-nine contributing buildings that are located in the central business district and surrounding residential area of Goldsboro. Most of the buildings date between 1850 and 1930, with some notable Greek Revival-style structures. The houses are mostly small, 2 1/2-story, vernacular, wood frame dwellings.

== Gallery ==
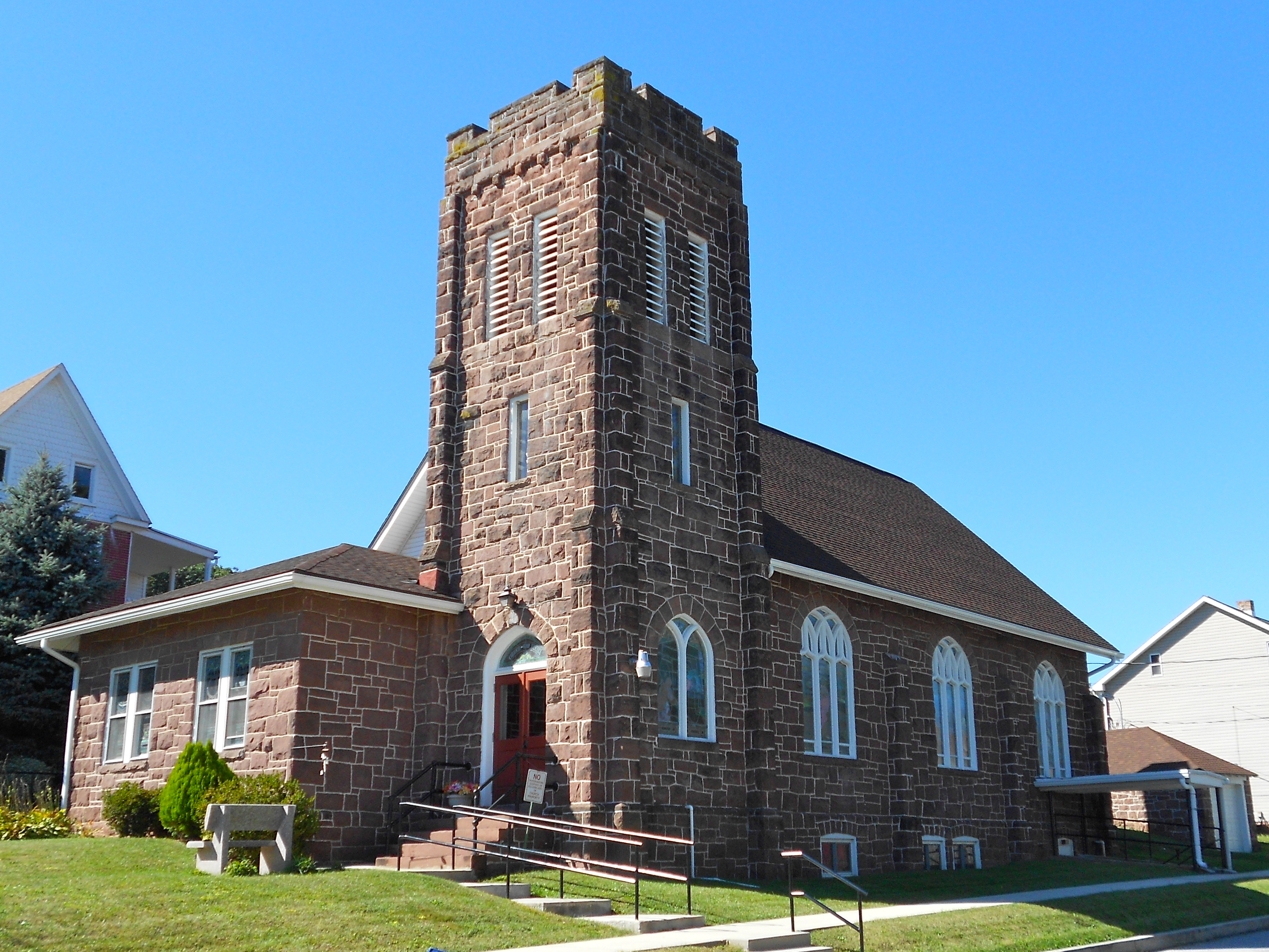
Church of God

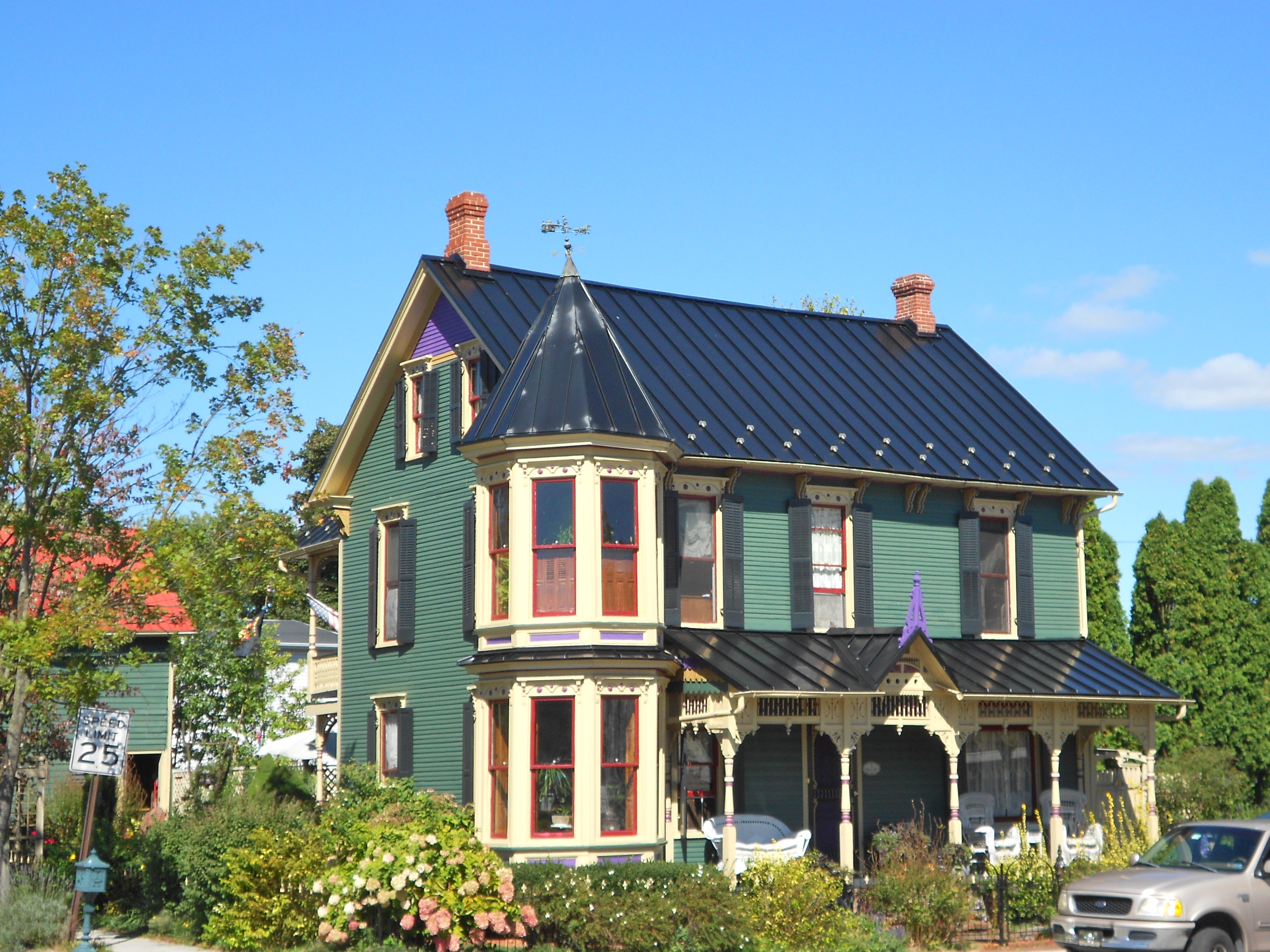
House on the square

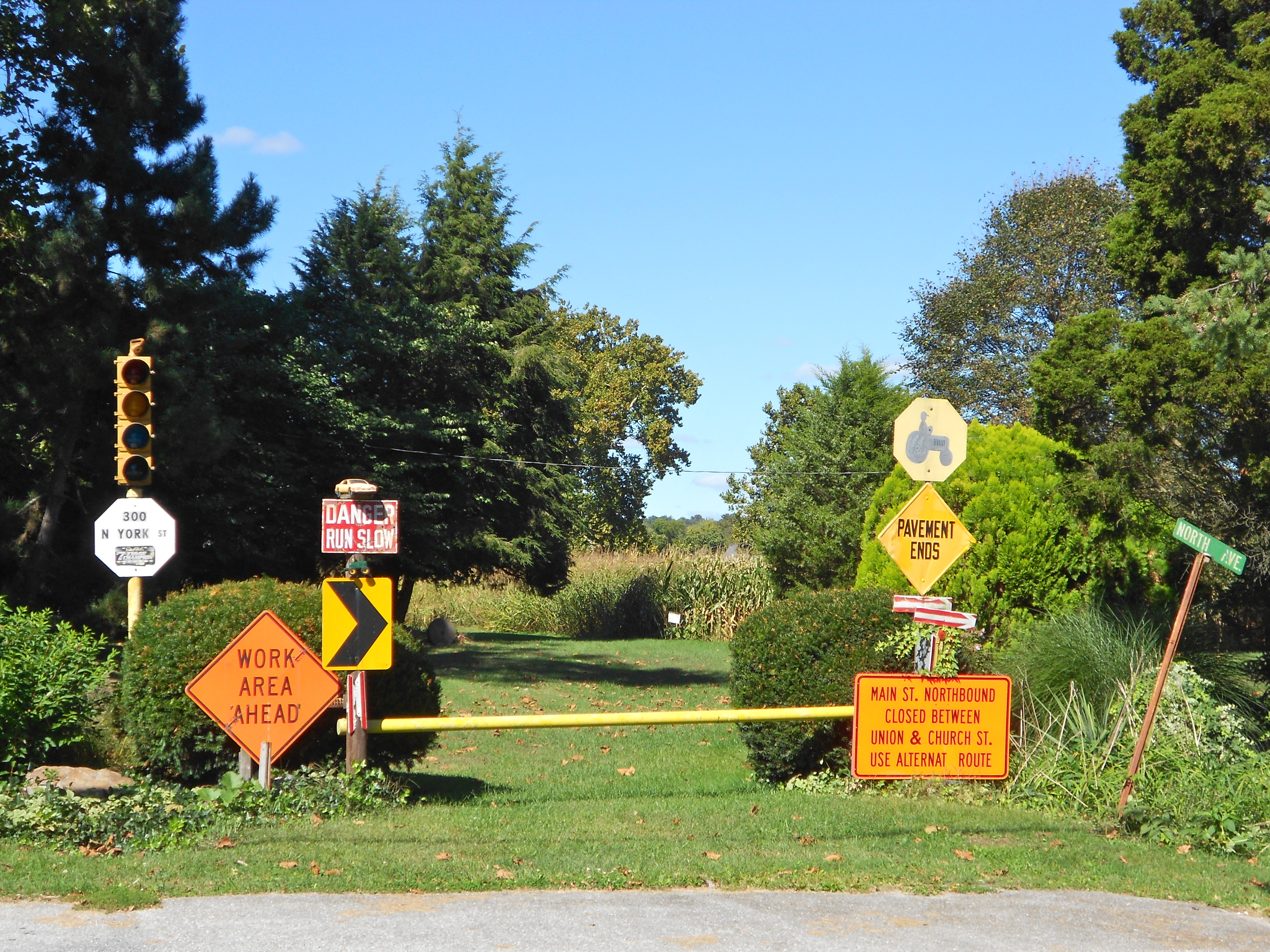
End of the road, north end of town
