= Cly, Pennsylvania =

Unincorporated area in Pennsylvania, US

Cly
- Unincorporated community
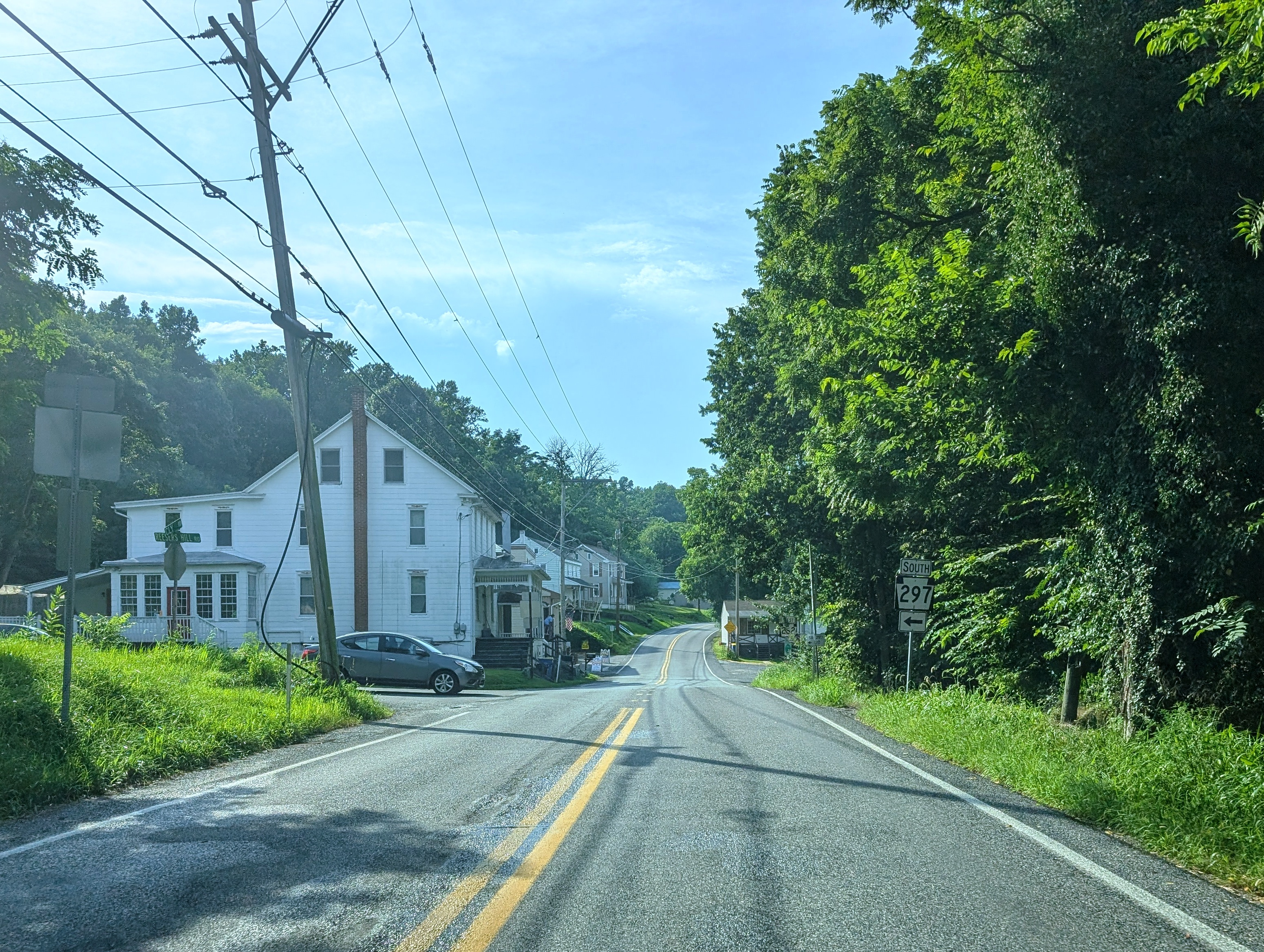
- PA 262 westbound through Cly

- Location within the state of Pennsylvania Cly (the United States)
- Coordinates: 40°7′26″N 76°44′11″W
- Country: United States
- State: Pennsylvania
- County: York
- Elevation: 305 ft (93 m)
- Time zone: UTC-5 (Eastern (EST))
  - Summer (DST): UTC-4 (EDT)
- GNIS feature ID: 1172040

Cly is an unincorporated community in Newberry Township, York County, Pennsylvania, United States. Cly is located on Cly Road Route 262, between York Haven and Goldsboro on the Susquehanna River.

== History ==
Cly was on an important stagecoach route between York and Harrisburg.

The prosperity of the stagecoach era started to decline in the 1830s with the completion of the Codorus Canal into York. Also, in the 1830s, a railroad was put in and still runs through it. Today, the railroad only carries cargo and is operated by Norfolk Southern. Today, the only businesses in Cly are a bar and a landscaping service. Until the late 1990s, the community played host to a minor league baseball team called the Cly Bulldogs. For the last two years, it has hosted the Cly Mudcats, an All-star team from the York Adult Recreation League. Between the two teams, the field was controlled by a local school district and almost sold to a developer. In the late 1990s, a developer bought a small tract of land beside the Cly Ball Field, and built Riverside Village. During construction a Native American burial ground was found. Construction was halted for over a year while the site was excavated. Between completion and today, one of the houses has burnt down three times.
