= Rossville, Pennsylvania =

Unincorporated area in Pennsylvania, US

- Unincorporated community
- Location within Pennsylvania
- Coordinates: 40°03′50″N 76°55′03″W
- Country: United States
- State: Pennsylvania
- County: York
- Township: Warrington
- Elevation: 509 ft (155 m)
- Time zone: UTC-5 (Eastern (EST))
  - Summer (DST): UTC-4 (EDT)
- ZIP code: 17358
- Area code: 717
- GNIS feature ID: 2756699

Rossville is an unincorporated community in Warrington Township in York County, Pennsylvania, United States. Rossville is located at the intersection of Pennsylvania Route 74, Pennsylvania Route 177, and Old York Road northeast of Wellsville and southwest of Gifford Pinchot State Park.
