= Strinestown, Pennsylvania =

Unincorporated community in Pennsylvania, U.S.

Coordinates: 40°05′28″N 76°45′41″W

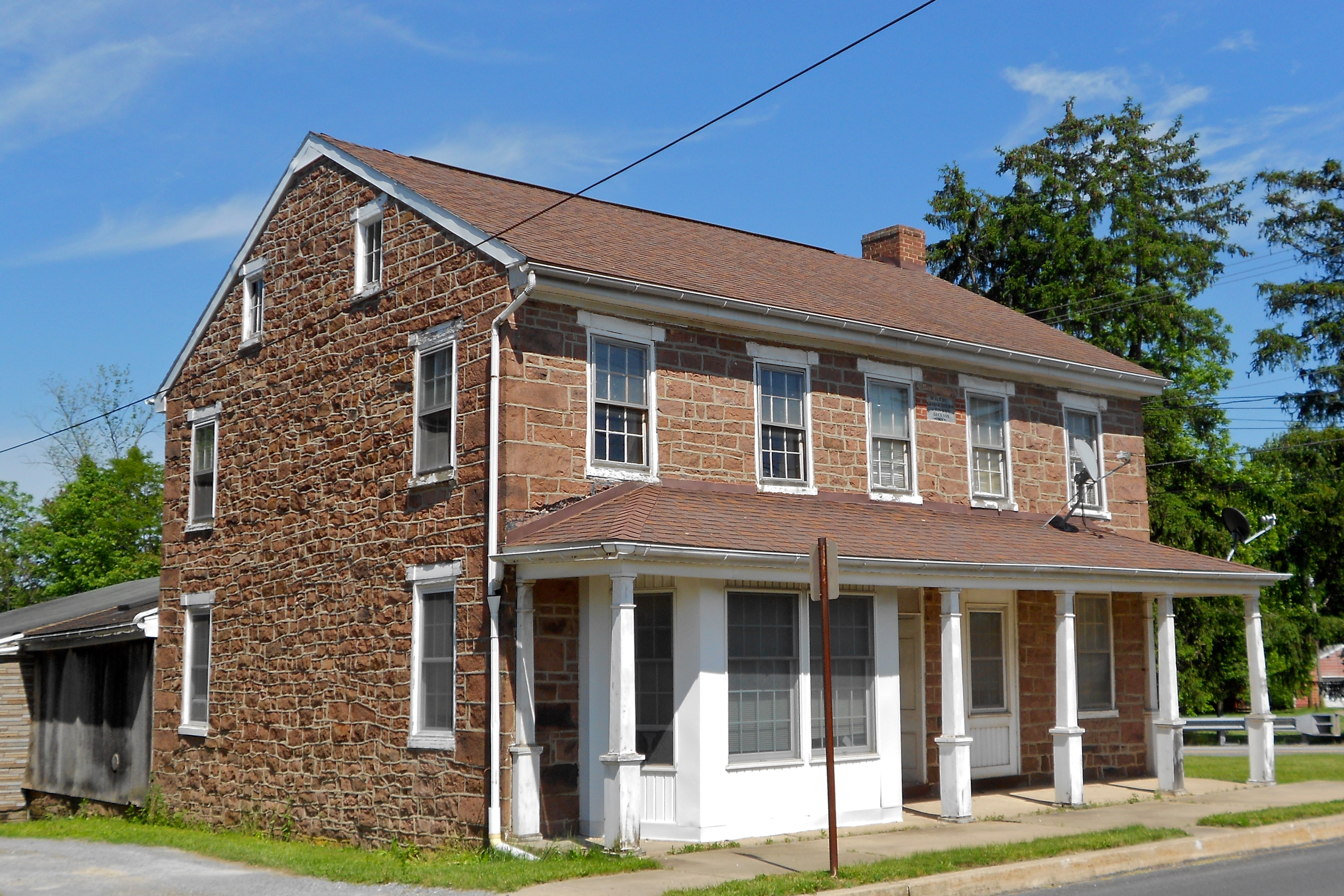
House in Strinestown

Strinestown is an unincorporated community in Conewago Township, York County, Pennsylvania, United States.
