= Frogtown, Pennsylvania =

Unincorporated community in Pennsylvania, US

- Unincorporated community
- Location within Pennsylvania
- Coordinates: 40°57′04″N 79°39′25″W
- Country: United States
- State: Pennsylvania
- County: Armstrong
- Township: Sugarcreek
- Elevation: 1,004 ft (306 m)
- Time zone: UTC-5 (Eastern (EST))
  - Summer (DST): UTC-4 (EDT)
- GNIS feature ID: 1175289

Frogtown is an unincorporated community in Sugarcreek Township, Armstrong County, Pennsylvania, United States.
