= Susquehanna Trail =

Susquehanna Trail marker

Older Susquehanna Trail marker

The Susquehanna Trail was an auto trail in the United States linking Washington, D.C., with Niagara Falls, New York. It passed through Baltimore, Maryland; Harrisburg, Pennsylvania; Williamsport, Pennsylvania; and Buffalo, New York.

In relatively modern terms, the Susquehanna Trail roughly followed the following highways:

- U.S. Route 1, Washington, D.C., to Baltimore, Maryland
- U.S. Route 111 (now MD Route 45, Interstate 83 Business and other minor routes), Baltimore to Harrisburg, Pennsylvania
- U.S. Route 22, Harrisburg to Duncannon, Pennsylvania
- U.S. Route 11, Duncannon to Northumberland, Pennsylvania
- PA Route 147, Northumberland to Muncy, Pennsylvania
- U.S. Route 220, Muncy to Williamsport, Pennsylvania
- U.S. Route 15, Williamsport to Wayland, New York
- NY Route 63, Wayland to Dansville, New York
- NY Route 36, Dansville to Leicester, New York
- U.S. Route 20A, Leicester to East Aurora, New York
- NY Route 16, East Aurora to Buffalo, New York
- NY Route 5 and U.S. Route 62, Buffalo to Niagara Falls, New York

An alternate ran from Washington to Harrisburg via U.S. Route 240 and U.S. Route 15 through Frederick, Maryland.
