= Lewisberry, Pennsylvania =

Borough in Pennsylvania, US

- Borough
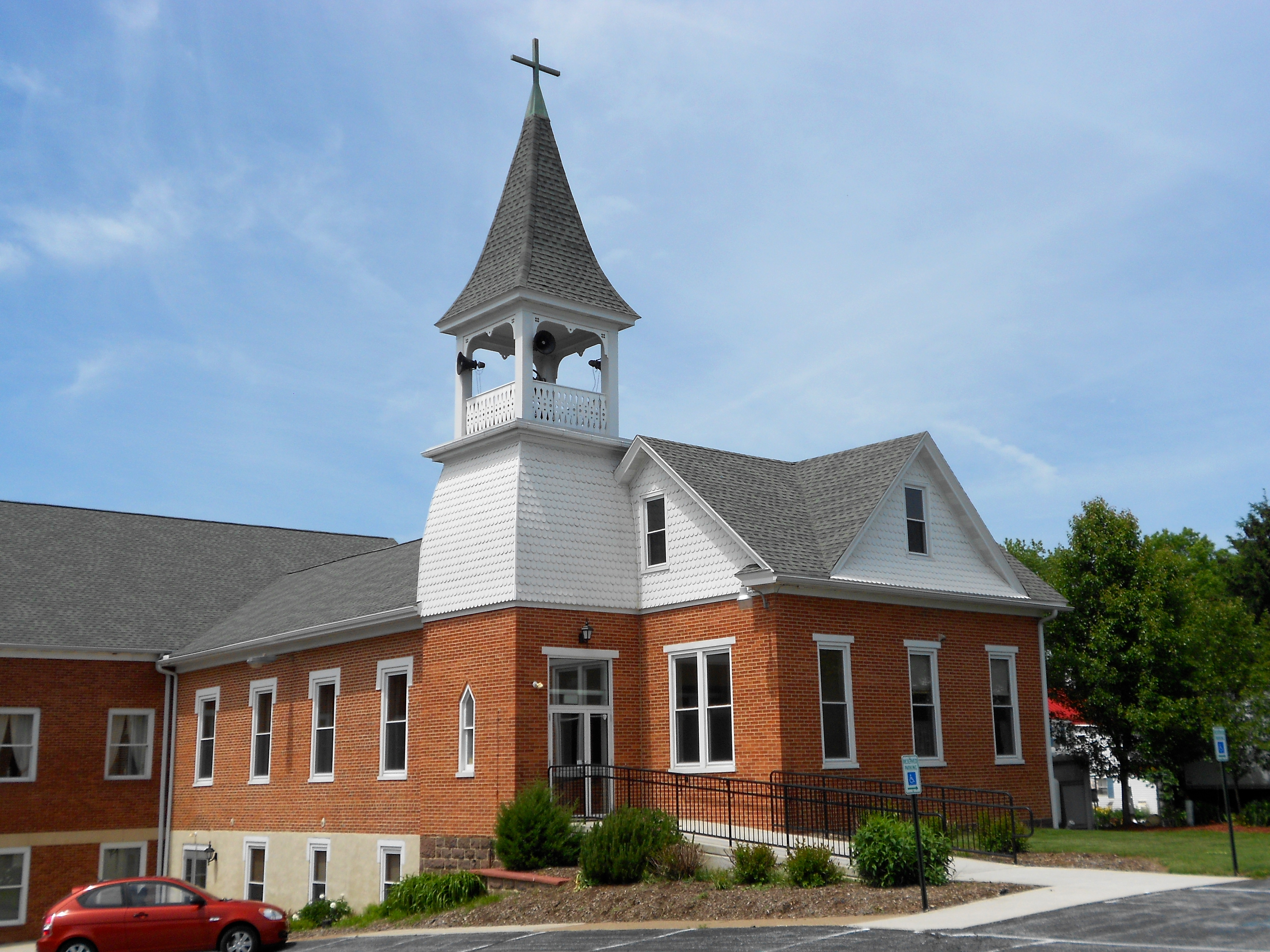
- Lewisberry United Methodist Church

- Location in York County and the U.S. state of Pennsylvania.

- Location of Lewisberry in Pennsylvania Lewisberry (the United States)
- Coordinates: 40°08′07″N 76°51′38″W
- Country: United States
- State: Pennsylvania
- County: York
- Settled: 1798
- Incorporated: 1832

Government
  - Type: Borough Council
  - Mayor: Wayne Branyan

Area
  - Total: 0.14 sq mi (0.36 km^{2})
  - Land: 0.14 sq mi (0.36 km^{2})
  - Water: 0 sq mi (0.00 km^{2})
- Elevation: 433 ft (132 m)

Population (2020)
  - Total: 382
  - Density: 2,750/sq mi (1,062/km^{2})
- Time zone: UTC-5 (Eastern (EST))
  - Summer (DST): UTC-4 (EDT)
- Zip code: 17339
- Area code: 717
- FIPS code: 42-42968
- Website: lewisberryborough.org

Lewisberry is a borough in York County, Pennsylvania, United States. The population was 380 at the 2020 census. It is part of the York–Hanover metropolitan area.

== History ==
=== Early settlement ===
The lands in and around the borough of Lewisberry were under control of the Susquehannock people until the first Quaker settlements in the 1730s. These settlements were among the first Quaker settlements in America west of the Susquehanna River. Among the group of original titleholders along the small creek that would become known as Bennett Run were Ellis Lewis, Joseph Bennett, John Rankin, John Heald, and John Hall. At this time, the area that would become York County was still almost entirely populated by the Susquehannock Indians. Yet there are few recorded conflicts between these early settlers and the native population. In this area that would later become majority Pennsylvania German, the first and second waves of settlers were almost entirely English speakers and included the Kirks, Rankins, Huttons, Garetsons, Nebingers, Eppleys, Starrs, Fosters, Clines, Stromingers, Moores, Frankelbergers, Suttons, Wickershams, Prowells, Millers, and Hammonds. While most were Quakers, a significant minority were Anglicans. The Quaker meeting house at the intersection of Old Quaker and Lewisberry roads (PA 382) is the original Quaker meeting house in the area.

=== Founding of borough ===
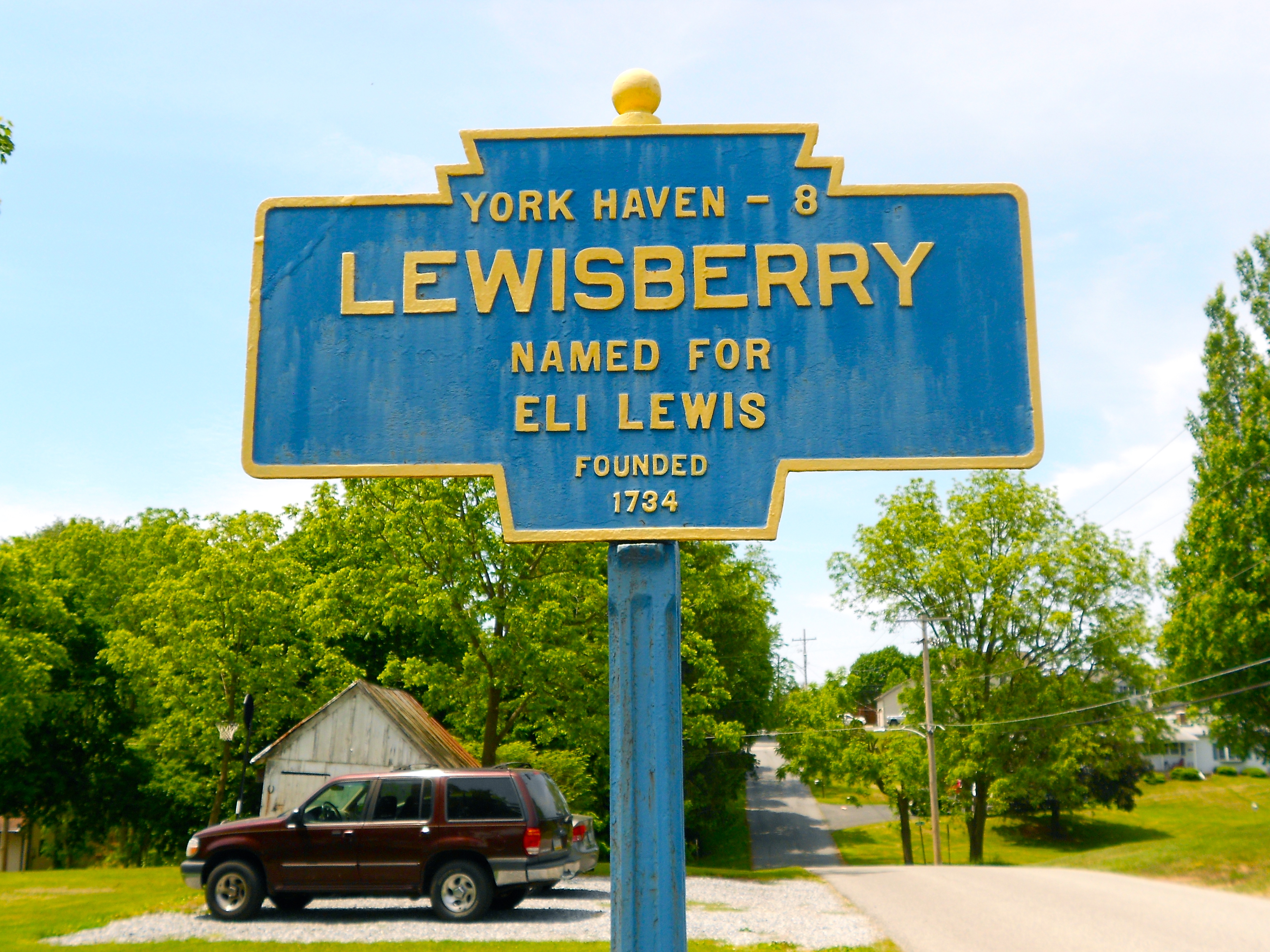
Lewisberry's Keystone Marker

The borough's founder, Eli Lewis, was born nearby in 1750, the son of one of the original settlers, Ellis Lewis. On the eve of the American Revolution, Eli opened a store on the site of the current borough. Lewis and members of other prominent families in the area served in the Pennsylvania militia, and Eli rose to the rank of major. Over the course of the war, the town became known for producing guns, and the Committee of Safety for York County contracted with area gunsmiths to supply the Continental Army; guns made in Lewisberry were in use by the US Army as late as the Siege of Veracruz during the Mexican–American War of 1846. Following the Revolutionary War, Lewis' fortune grew (and he eventually owned 850 acres in the area) and his store was the center of commerce in the Redland Valley. In 1798, Issac Kirk surveyed twelve acres of land and laid out lots for Lewis, who wanted a town to exist on the site. While all of the lots were not immediately sold, many were, and the town began a modest growth. Between 1790 and 1798, Major Lewis had lived in Harrisburg, where he took up printing and published the first Harrisburg newspaper, The Advertiser, which was then sold to John Wyeth, who renamed it The Oracle of Dauphin. While living in Harrisburg, Lewis also published the popular poem, "St. Clair's Defeat," which described the defeat of Arthur St. Clair by the tribes of the Western Confederacy during the Battle of the Wabash.

=== Incorporation and growth ===
Lewisberry was not incorporated until 1832, fifty years later, and the first census figures of 1840 show a population of 220. In 1800, Henry Ensminger opened a large tannery just south of town that was later owned and operated by Samuel Grove. More significant for the town's growth was John Herman, who built a large flour mill on the west side of the borough. But the town's most successful operator was Andrew Cline, who ran a large and successful milling business during the second half of the 19th century. The mill and house are still standing just outside the borough beside Silver Lake, which was created to power the mill. One of Lewisberry's most important small industries during the 19th and early 20th centuries was the manufacture of block brimstone matches, and the families of Lyman Lewis, Herman Kirk, Moses Magrew, Rt. Starr, and Lyman Shettle became prosperous through this industry.

In the early 19th century, Joseph Potts manufactured the area's first coffee mills out of his home. This industry grew under his children, and by the middle of the century, Lewisberry was producing large numbers of coffee grinders in a small factory near the Quaker meeting house. In 1835, William Smith started a newspaper in the bustling town. In 1837, Lewisberry native Hervey Hammond began to manufacture his patented Hammond window sash spring, and in 1838, President Martin Van Buren installed Hammond springs in all of the White House's windows.

== Geography ==
Lewisberry is located at 40°8′7″N 76°51′38″W (40.135300, -76.860504).

According to the United States Census Bureau, the borough has a total area of 0.1 square miles (0.26 km^{2}), all land.

Ski Roundtop is located 3 miles (5 km) southwest of Lewisberry.

== Demographics ==
Historical population
Census	Pop.	Note	%±
1850	245		—
1860	292		19.2%
1870	268		−8.2%
1880	283		5.6%
1890	170		−39.9%
1900	228		34.1%
1910	233		2.2%
1920	197		−15.5%
1930	226		14.7%
1940	262		15.9%
1950	299		14.1%
1960	314		5.0%
1970	490		56.1%
1980	309		−36.9%
1990	314		1.6%
2000	385		22.6%
2010	362		−6.0%
2020	382		5.5%
2021 (est.)	379	▼	−0.8%

As of the census of 2000, there were 385 people, 146 households, and 102 families residing in the borough. The population density was 2,892.4 inhabitants per square mile (1,116.8/km^{2}). There were 150 housing units at an average density of 1,126.9 per square mile (435.1/km^{2}). The racial makeup of the borough was 97.40% White, 1.82% African American, 0.26% Asian, 0.26% from other races, and 0.26% from two or more races. Hispanic or Latino of any race were 2.60% of the population.

There were 146 households, out of which 43.8% had children under the age of 18 living with them, 53.4% were married couples living together, 9.6% had a female householder with no husband present, and 29.5% were non-families. 26.0% of all households were made up of individuals, and 10.3% had someone living alone who was 65 years of age or older. The average household size was 2.64 and the average family size was 3.16.

In the borough the population was spread out, with 30.4% under the age of 18, 6.0% from 18 to 24, 40.3% from 25 to 44, 13.2% from 45 to 64, and 10.1% who were 65 years of age or older. The median age was 32 years. For every 100 females there were 98.5 males. For every 100 females age 18 and over, there were 91.4 males.

The median income for a household in the borough was $49,844, and the median income for a family was $58,125. Males had a median income of $31,667 versus $27,250 for females. The per capita income for the borough was $16,147. About 4.5% of families and 3.9% of the population were below the poverty line, including 3.5% of those under age 18 and 18.2% of those age 65 or over.

== Gravity Hill ==
The intersection of Pennsylvania Route 177 and Pleasant View Road near the borough is said to allow an automobile in neutral to drift uphill. According to legend, this effect is caused by the ghosts of children once killed in a bus accident, who push the car uphill to prevent similar occurrences. However, the phenomenon is caused by a gravity hill optical illusion.

== Little League World Series ==
In 2015, the Red Land Little League from Lewisberry participated in the Little League World Series, winning the U.S. Championship and finishing as runner-up to Japan in the world championship game. It was the first appearance for a Pennsylvania team in the final game since 1990 when the Shippensburg Little League Team was defeated by the San Hua Little League Team of Tainan, Taiwan.

== Notable residents ==
- Stephen Zack (born 1992), basketball player
