= Goldsboro, Pennsylvania =

Borough in Pennsylvania, US

- Borough
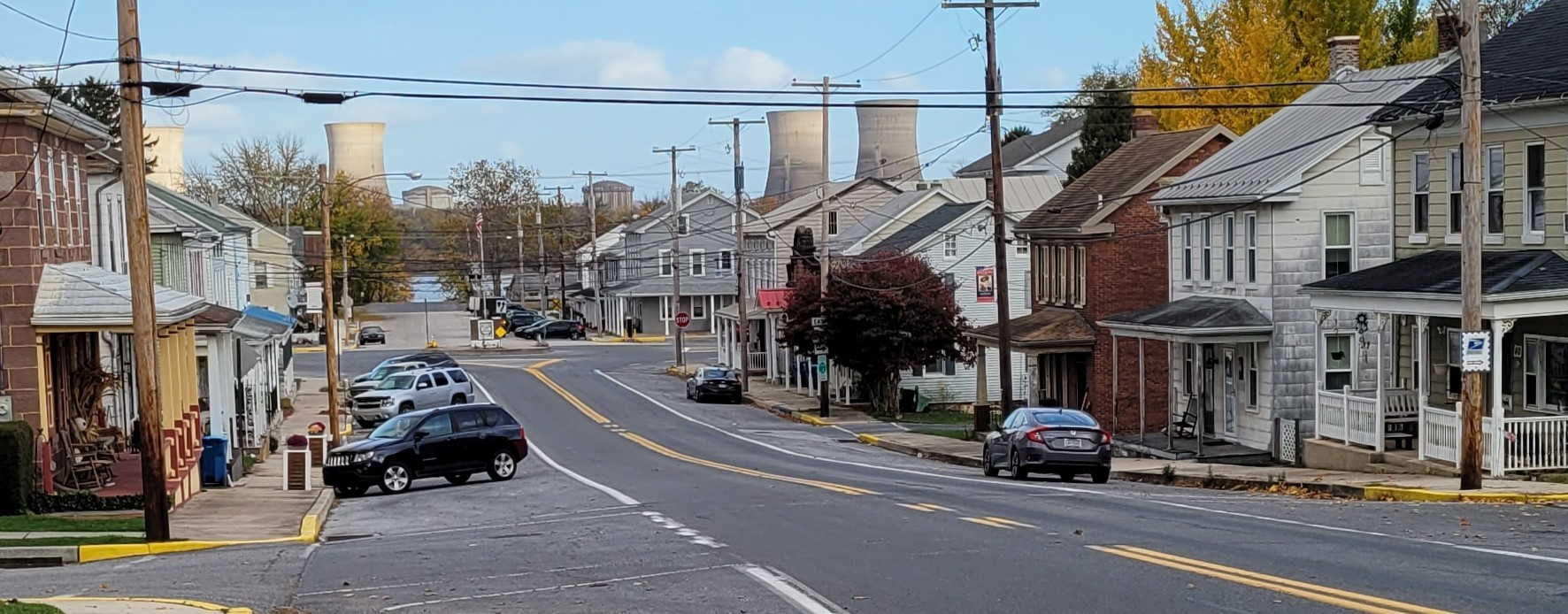
- Goldsboro in 2022 with Three Mile Island in the background

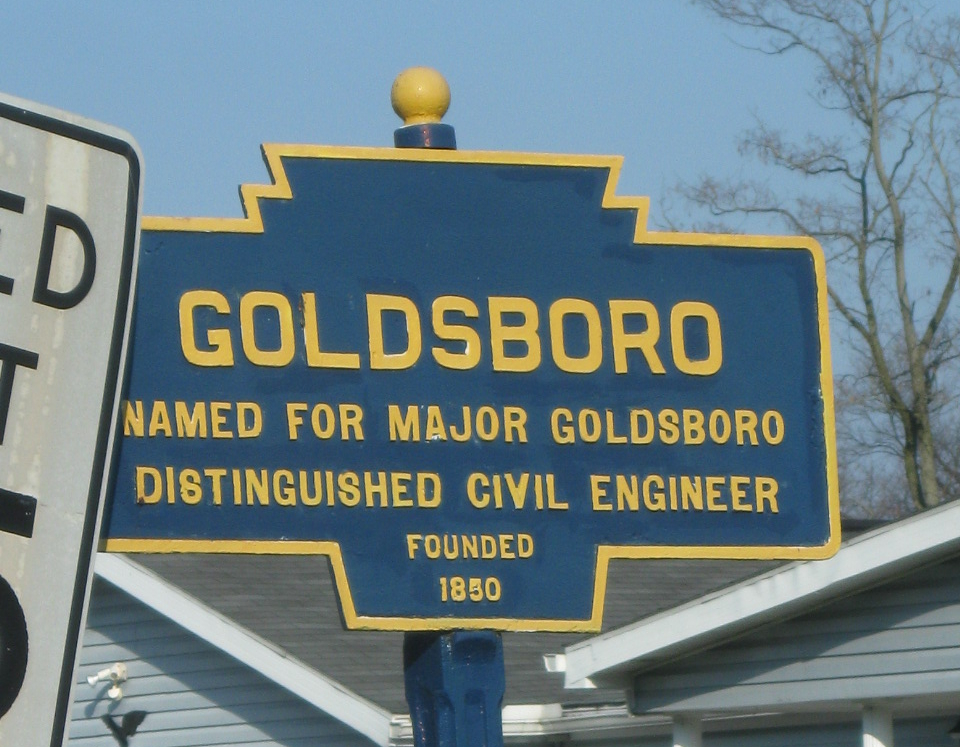
- Keystone Marker

- Location in York County and the U.S. state of Pennsylvania.

- Location of Goldsboro in Pennsylvania Goldsboro (the United States)
- Coordinates: 40°09′08″N 76°45′02″W
- Country: United States
- State: Pennsylvania
- County: York
- Settled: 1736
- Founded: 1850
- Incorporated: 1864

Government
  - Type: Borough Council
  - Mayor: Douglas G. Smith

Area
  - Total: 0.46 sq mi (1.18 km^{2})
  - Land: 0.45 sq mi (1.17 km^{2})
  - Water: 0.0039 sq mi (0.01 km^{2})
- Elevation: 344 ft (105 m)

Population (2020)
  - Total: 930
  - Estimate (2023): 928
  - Density: 2,067.4/sq mi (798.22/km^{2})
- Time zone: UTC-5 (Eastern (EST))
  - Summer (DST): UTC-4 (EDT)
- ZIP code: 17319
- Area codes: 717, 223
- FIPS code: 42-30016
- Website: goldsboropa.com

Goldsboro (formerly Goldsborough) is a borough in York County, Pennsylvania, United States. The population was 930 at the 2020 census. It is part of the York–Hanover metropolitan area.

For historical reasons, the post office in Goldsboro is named "Etters", although there is no incorporated place known by that name, and the United States Postal Service states that the name "Etters" is preferred over "Goldsboro" for addressing mail to ZIP code 17319.

== History ==
In 1734, John Day and Nathan Hussey, Quakers from New Castle County, Delaware, obtained land grants (called Bluntson Licenses) for land on which Goldsboro now stands. They became official in 1736, when the Penn Family made a treaty with the Iroquois Confederacy and purchased land in what became northern York County. John Day's land included virtually all of present day Goldsboro, and he built a mill right next to Fishing Creek as early as 1740. Nathan Hussey's land included present day South Goldsboro and Cly, and he opened a ferry across the Susquehanna River, where the early settlers would have crossed to their newly purchased land.

Along the turnpike, near the site of the Middletown Ferry, Henry Etter established Etter's Tavern, which included Etter's Post Office by 1838. Goldsboro was founded in 1850 upon completion of a railroad from York Haven to Harrisburg. Prior to completion of the railroad, the 20 or so houses that made up Goldsboro were affectionately referred to as Martinsville, for Martin P. Burger, who owned a store near the village. When the railway was completed in 1850, the village was named Goldsborough in honor of J.M. Goldsborough, the civil engineer of the railway. In 1849, Dr. Alexander Small surveyed Goldsborough, and he officially advertised lots for sale in the village of Goldsborough as early as November 19, 1850. The Borough of Goldsborough was incorporated in 1864.

A historical association was founded in 1976. The Goldsboro Historic District was listed on the National Register of Historic Places in 1984.

=== The American Lightweight Championship ===
On January 15, 1867, a prize fight took place in a field just north of Goldsboro between Sam Collyer and Johnny McGlade for the American Lightweight championship of boxing, and a purse of $2000. It was a bare-knuckle fight, which was illegal at the time, so they planned the match for the same day as the inauguration of the Governor of Pennsylvania in Harrisburg, the Civil War General John W. Geary, thinking that more attention would be on that event. The York County sheriff arrived after securing a posse with the Zeigle Guards, a military company already on its way to attend the inauguration. However, due to a miscommunication, the guards did not get off the train in Goldsboro, so the sheriff was left alone to try and make any arrests, which he was unable to.

The fight lasted 47 rounds in 55 minutes. Collyer was the winner and kept the American Lightweight Title. It was estimated that between 1000 and 2000 spectators were in attendance, including members of the PA state legislature, gamblers and underworld figures Kit Burns and Harry Hill, plus other boxers and former title holders of the day Young Barney Aaron, Dan Kerrigan, Johnny Moneghan and Joe Coburn. It was estimated over $200,000 in bets were won as a result of the fight.

=== Etymology of the name "Etters" ===
The name "Etters", used by the USPS to refer to the post office in Goldsboro, comes from the establishment in 1838 of a post office inside a tavern owned by Henry Etter, a former Revolutionary War soldier, approximately one mile north of the current location of Goldsboro. The post office was moved to Goldsboro in 1850, at which time it retained the name "Etters" to avoid confusion with the already established post office in Gouldsboro, Wayne County, PA. The 17319 ZIP code also covers parts of York County well beyond the borough of Goldsboro, including parts of Fairview Township, Valley Green, Newberry Township, Lewisberry Borough, and Yocumtown Village.

=== Three Mile Island Nuclear Disaster ===
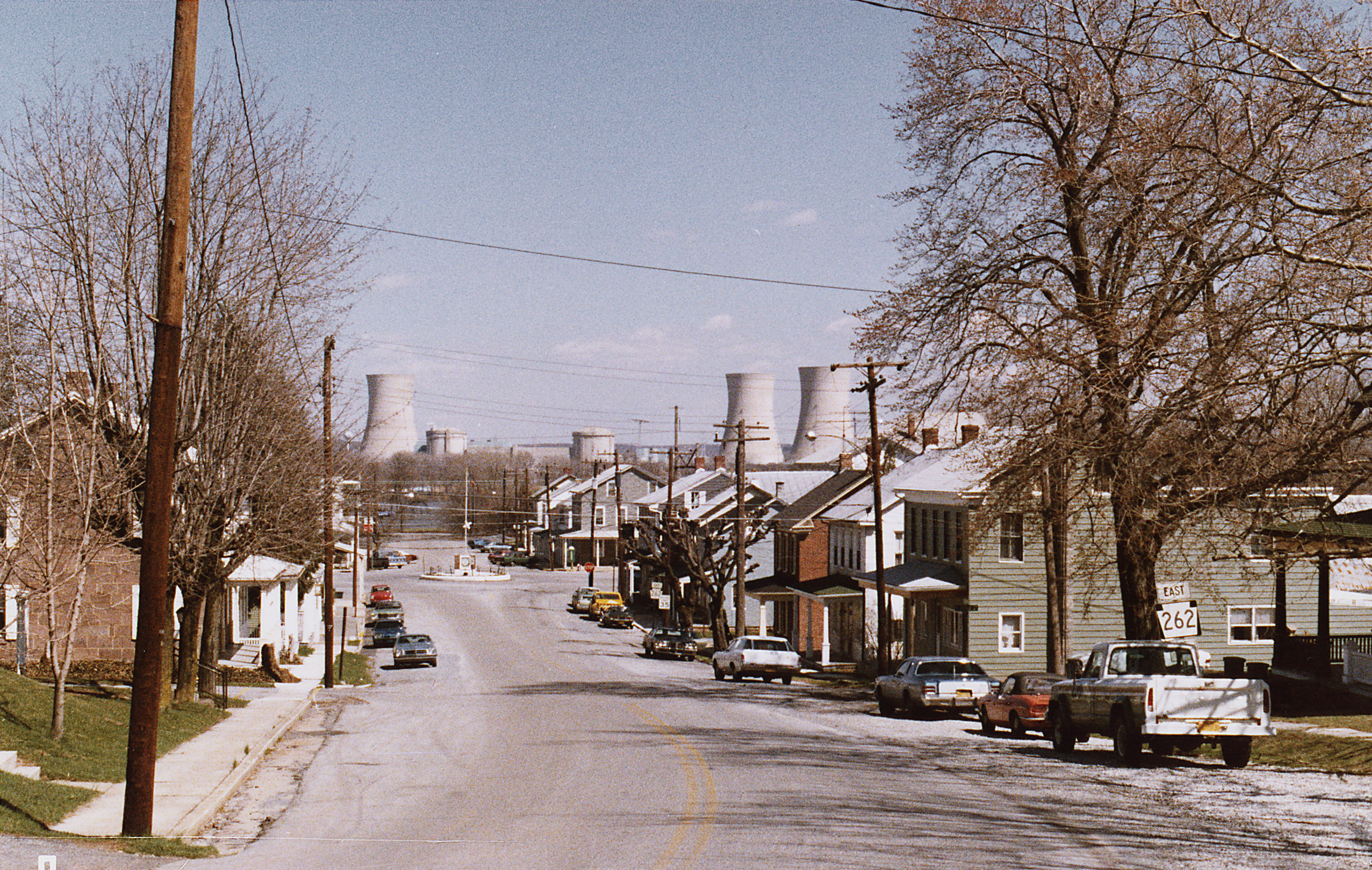
Goldsboro in 1979 with Three Mile Island in the background

There was a partial meltdown of reactor number 2 of Three Mile Island Nuclear Generating Station (TMI-2) in Dauphin County, Pennsylvania, directly across the river from Goldsboro, and subsequent radiation leak that occurred on March 28, 1979. It is the most significant accident in U.S. commercial nuclear power plant history. On the seven-point International Nuclear Event Scale, the incident was rated a five as an "accident with wider consequences." Residents of Goldsboro evacuated to nearby relatives and motels.

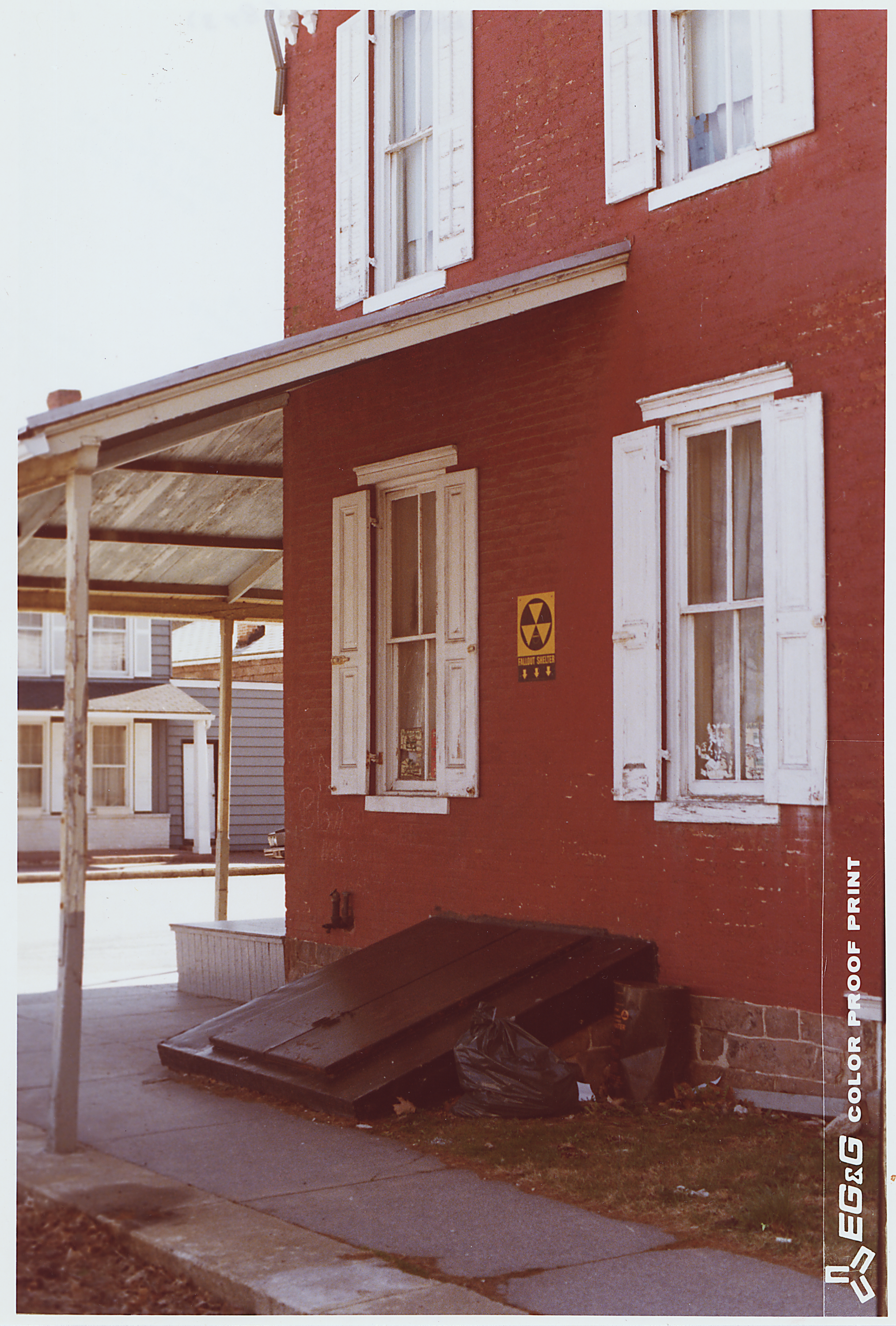
Fallout Shelter on Goldsboro square

Following the incident, radiation levels in the soil and water were closely monitored. Reports of animals and crop sickness came from farmers around Goldsboro, along with other health effects and cancers of people in the area. A peer-reviewed research article by Dr. Steven Wing found a significant increase in cancers from 1979–1985 among people who lived within ten miles of TMI; in 2009 Dr. Wing stated that radiation releases during the accident were probably "thousands of times greater" than the NRC's estimates. A retrospective study of Pennsylvania Cancer Registry found an increased incidence of thyroid cancer in some counties south of TMI (although, notably, not in Dauphin County itself) and in high-risk age groups but did not draw a causal link with these incidences and to the accident. The Talbott lab at the University of Pittsburgh reported finding only a few, small, mostly statistically non-significant, increased cancer risks within the TMI population, such as a non-significant excess leukemia among males being observed.

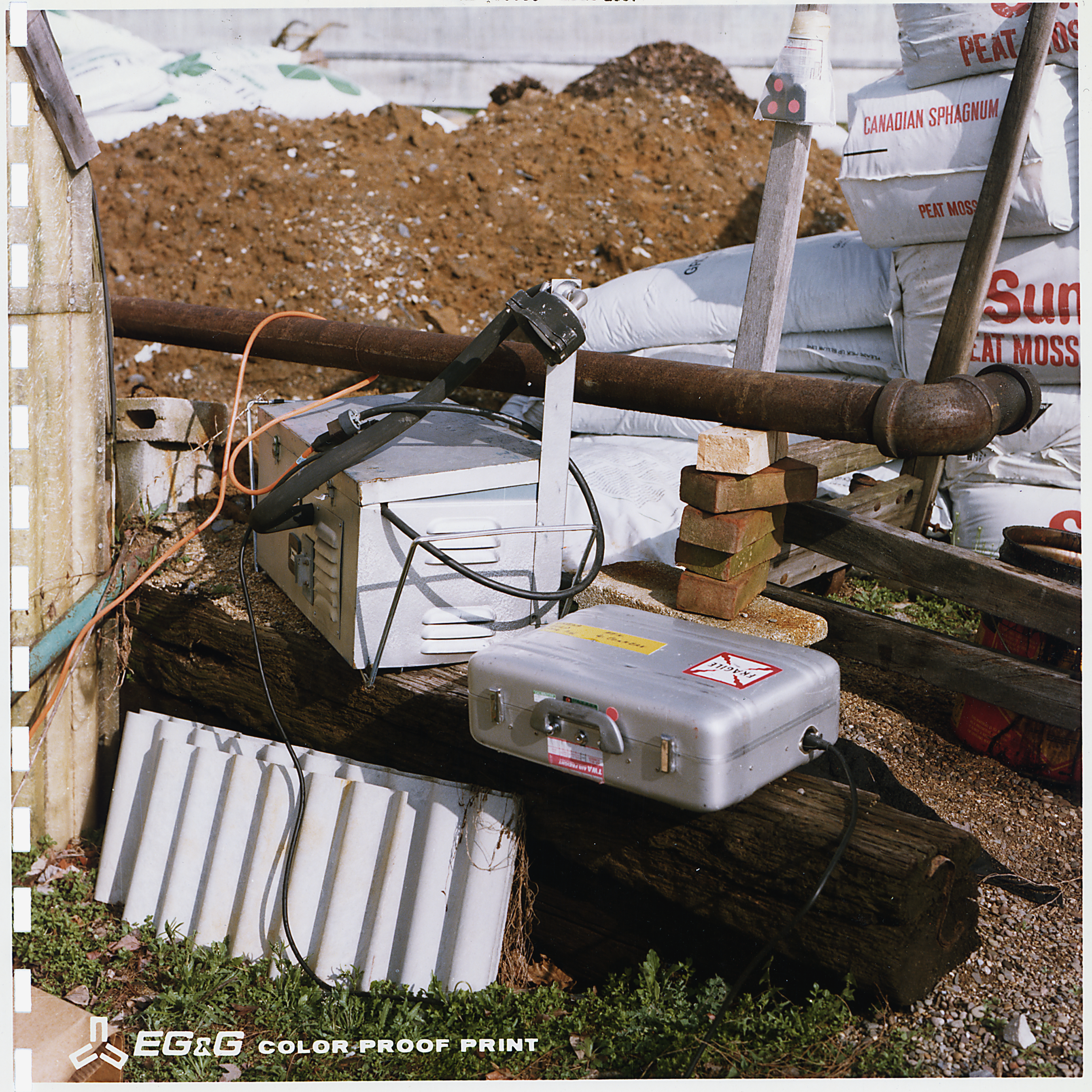
EPA sampling station

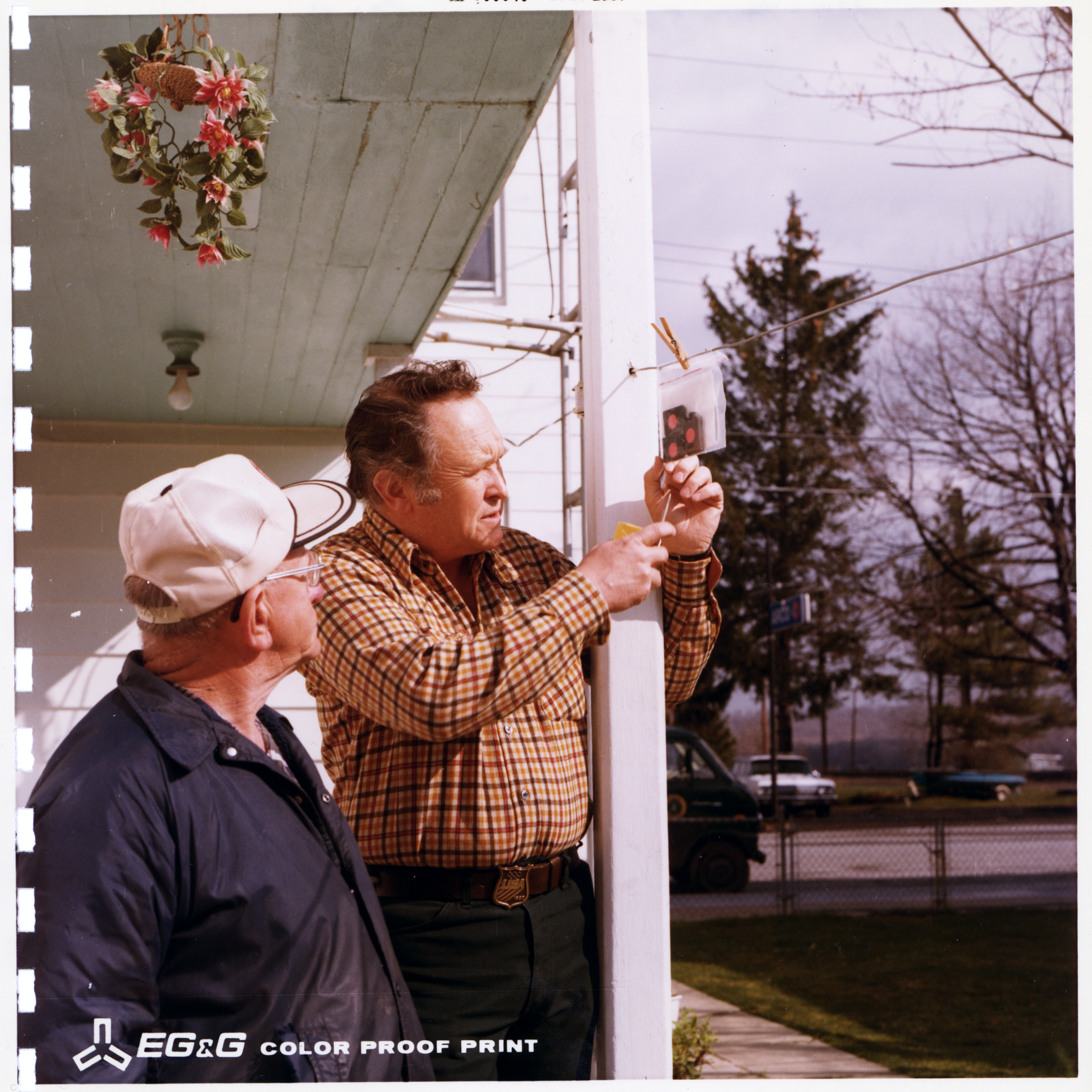
EPA checking for radiation with Goldsboro resident

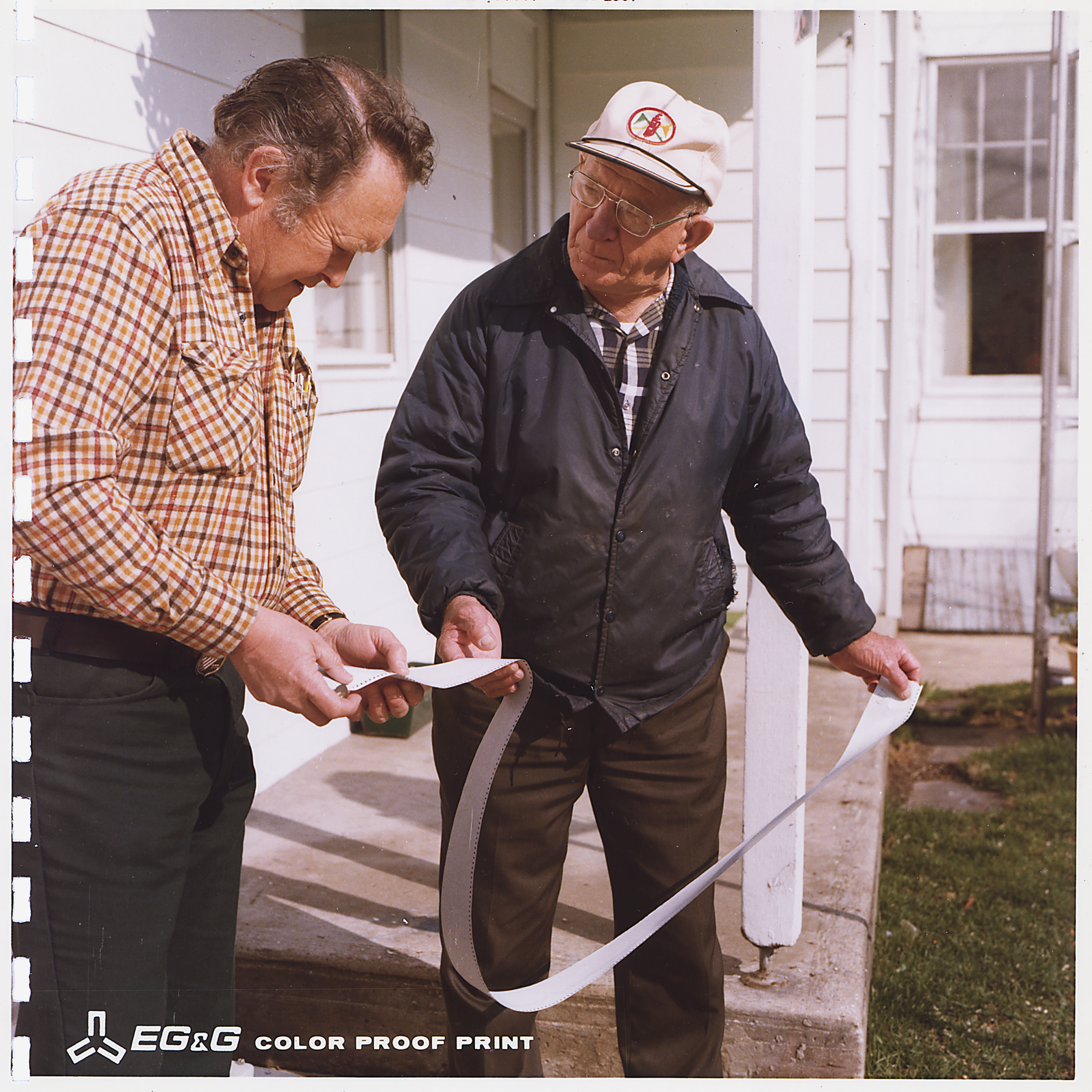
Looking at a strip chart with Goldsboro resident

== Geography ==
Goldsboro is located along the Susquehanna River and has a view of the Three Mile Island Nuclear Generating Station, the site of the largest nuclear accident in the United States.

== Demographics ==
Historical population
Census	Pop.	Note	%±
1870	310		—
1880	378		21.9%
1890	345		−8.7%
1900	385		11.6%
1910	434		12.7%
1920	477		9.9%
1930	459		−3.8%
1940	478		4.1%
1950	558		16.7%
1960	542		−2.9%
1970	576		6.3%
1980	477		−17.2%
1990	458		−4.0%
2000	939		105.0%
2010	952		1.4%
2020	932		−2.1%
2023 (est.)	928	▼	−0.4%

As of the census of 2000, there were 939 people, 333 households, and 260 families residing in the borough. The population density was 2,306.3 inhabitants per square mile (890.5/km^{2}). There were 365 housing units at an average density of 896.5 per square mile (346.1/km^{2}). The racial makeup of the borough was 98.51% White, 0.21% Native American, 0.53% Asian, 0.11% Pacific Islander, and 0.64% from two or more races. Hispanic or Latino of any race were 0.64% of the population.

Of the 333 households, 46.5% had children under the age of 18 living with them, 67.6% were married couples living together, 7.8% had a female householder with no husband present, and 21.9% were non-families. 17.7% of all households were made up of individuals, and 3.9% had someone living alone who was 65 years of age or older. The average household size was 2.82 and the average family size was 3.24.

In the borough the population was spread out, with 32.2% under the age of 18, 5.4% from 18 to 24, 40.4% from 25 to 44, 15.9% from 45 to 64, and 6.2% who were 65 years of age or older. The median age was 33 years. For every 100 females, there were 103.7 males. For every 100 females age 18 and over, there were 100.9 males.

The median income for a household in the borough was $57,054, and the median income for a family was $60,455. Males had a median income of $40,250 versus $31,146 for females. The per capita income for the borough was $19,164. About 1.7% of families and 2.3% of the population were below the poverty line, including 3.0% of those under age 18 and none of those age 65 or over.

== Education ==
The Goldsboro community is served by the West Shore School District.

== Notable people ==
- Greg Gross, former professional baseball outfielder, pinch hitter and 1980 World Series Champion.
- J. Michael Bishop, immunologist, microbiologist and 1989 Nobel Prize in Physiology or Medicine winner.

== Image Gallery ==
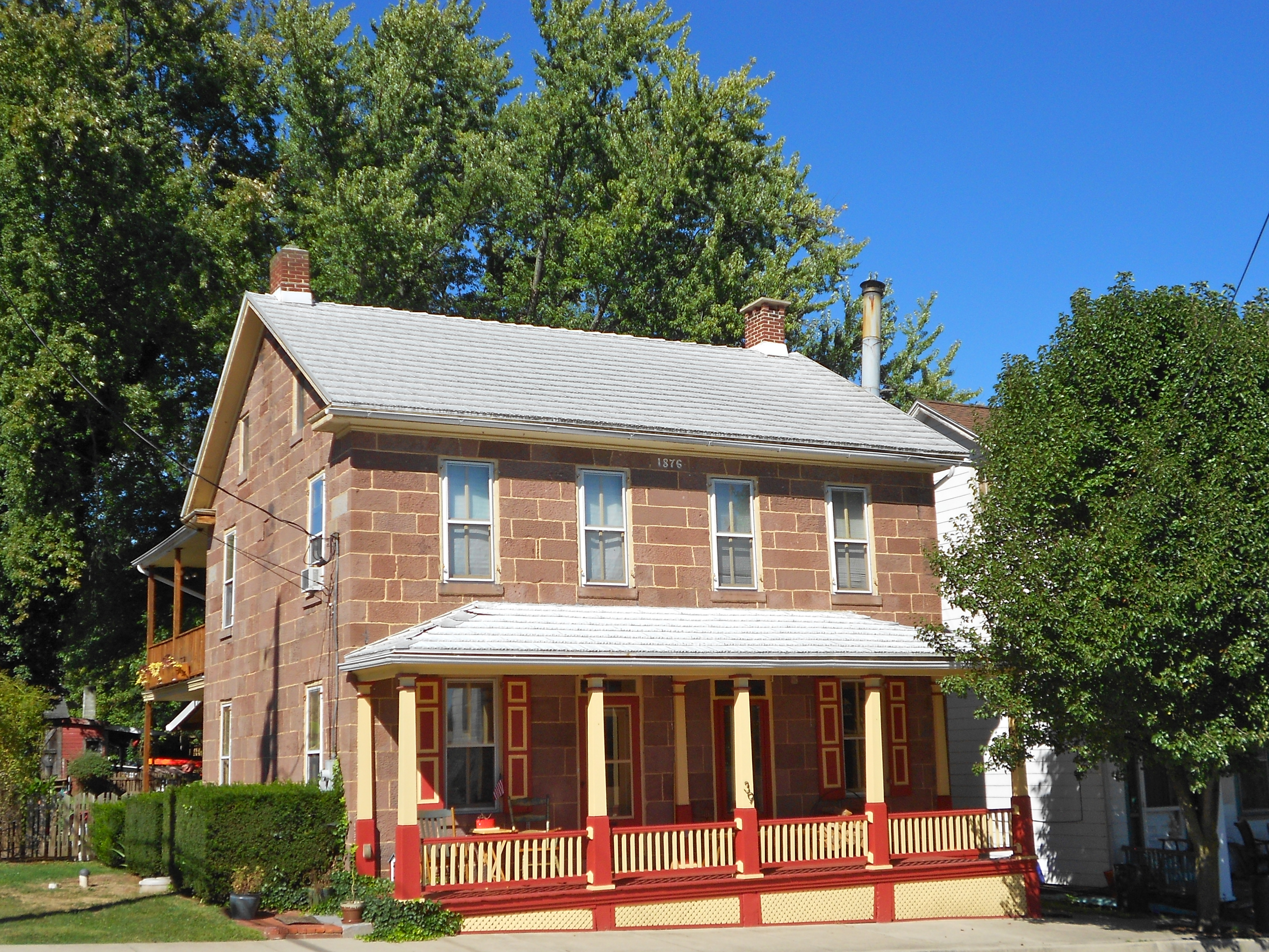
Stone House

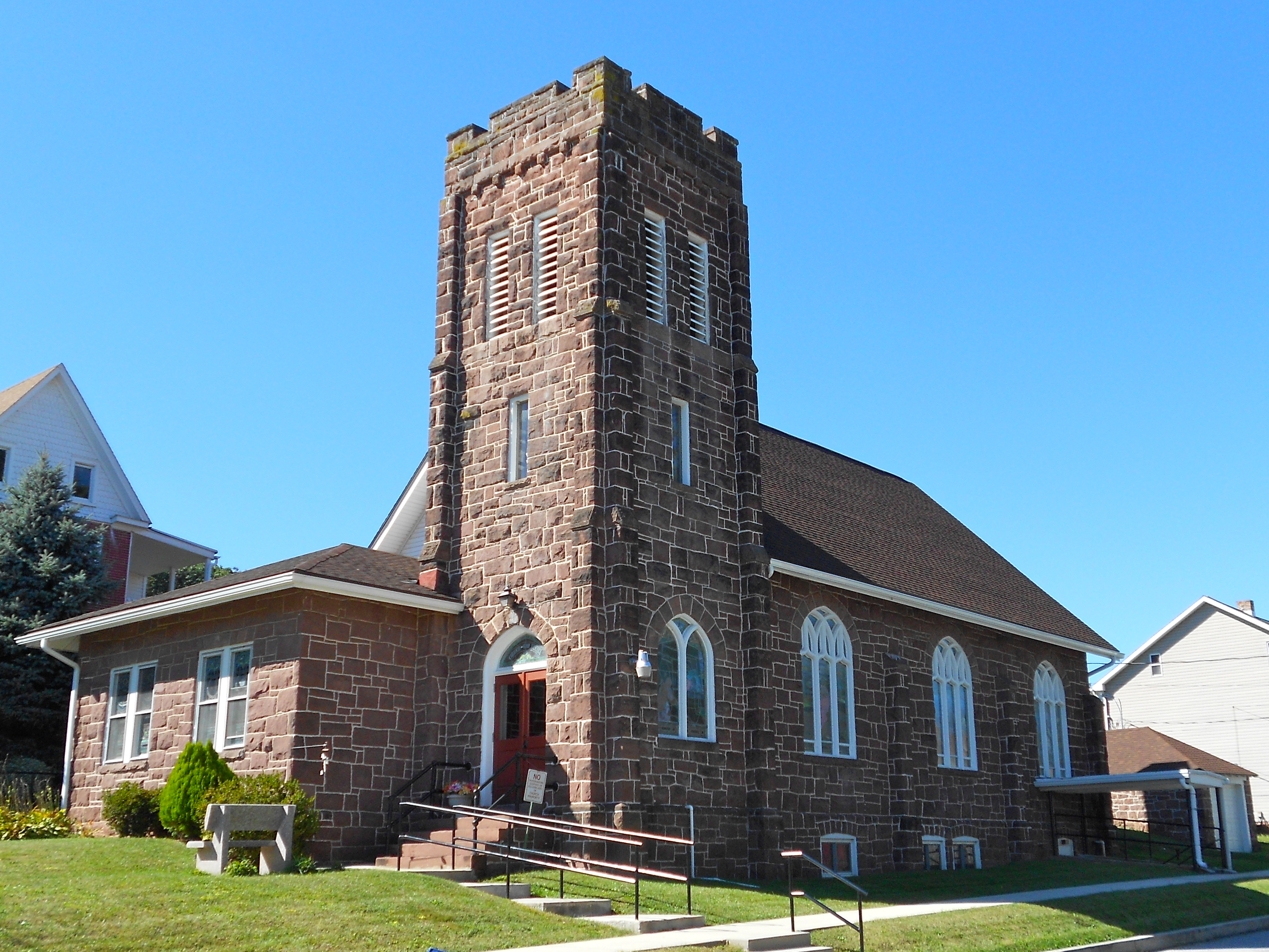
Church of God

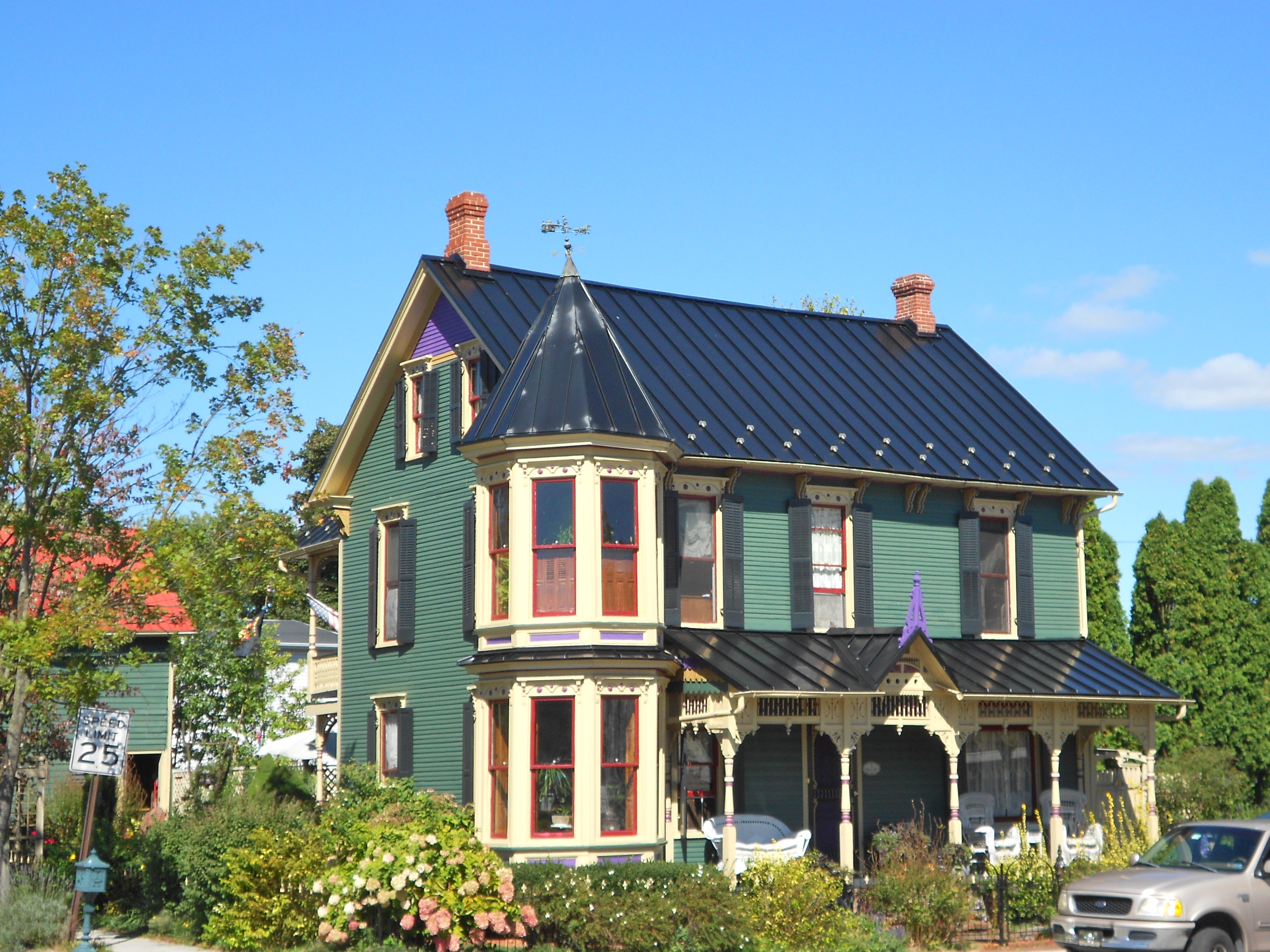
House on the square

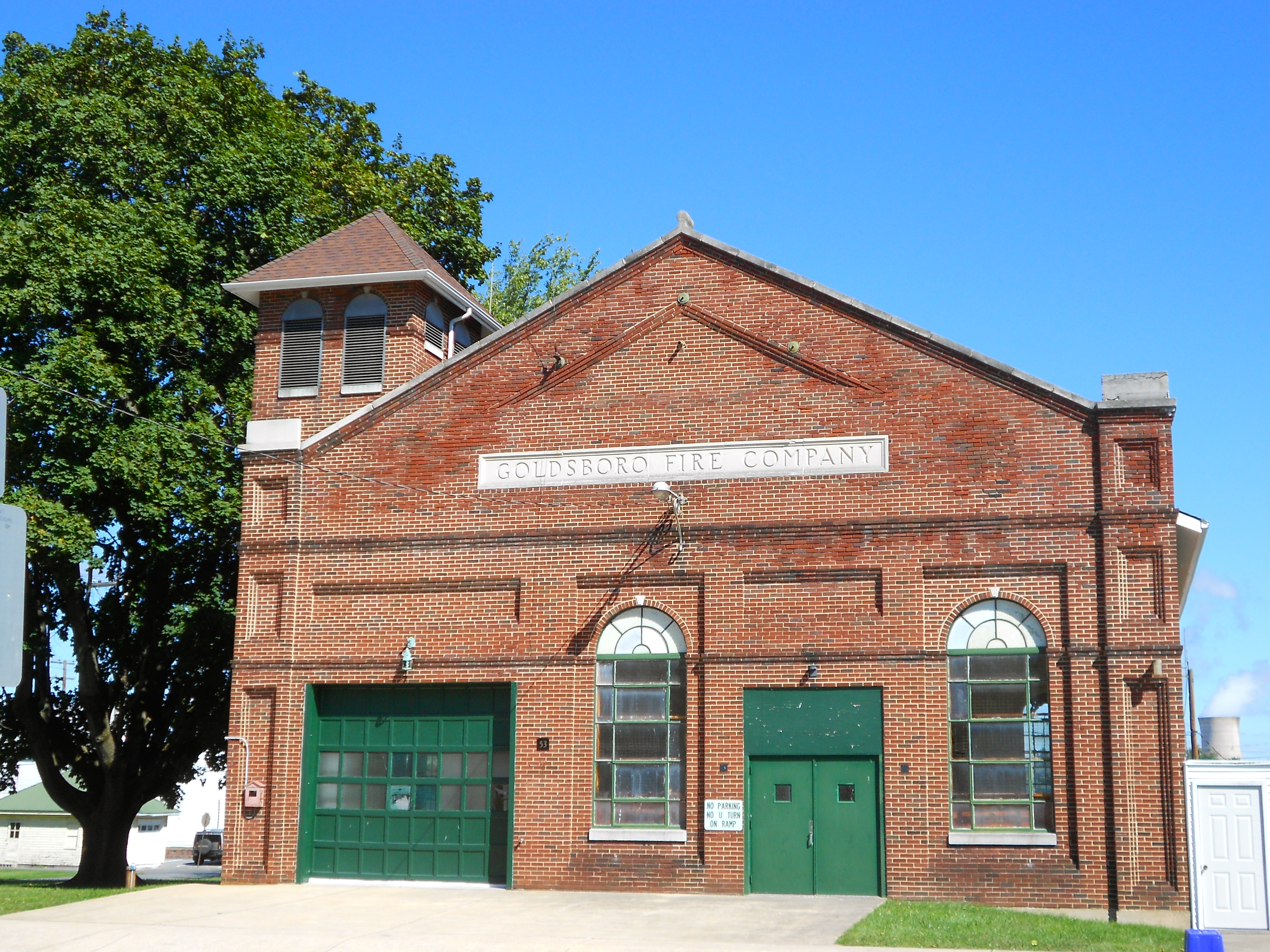
Old Fire Company Building
