= York Haven, Pennsylvania =

Borough in Pennsylvania, US

- Borough
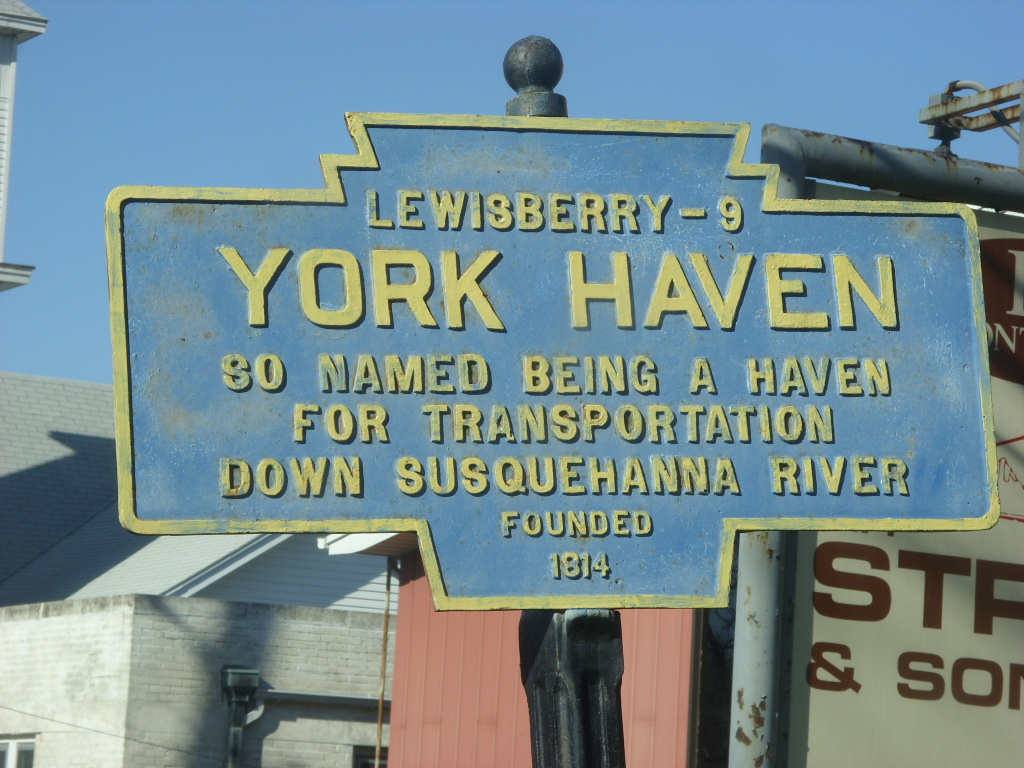
- Keystone Marker

- Location in York County and the U.S. state of Pennsylvania.

- Location of York Haven in Pennsylvania York Haven (the United States)
- Coordinates: 40°06′34″N 76°42′53″W
- Country: United States
- State: Pennsylvania
- County: York
- Settled: 1814
- Incorporated: 1892

Government
  - Type: Borough Council

Area
  - Total: 0.32 sq mi (0.84 km^{2})
  - Land: 0.30 sq mi (0.77 km^{2})
  - Water: 0.027 sq mi (0.07 km^{2})
- Elevation: 377 ft (115 m)

Population (2020)
  - Total: 691 ▼
  - Estimate (2021): 692
  - Density: 2,325/sq mi (897.7/km^{2})
- Time zone: UTC-5 (Eastern (EST))
  - Summer (DST): UTC-4 (EDT)
- Zip code: 17370
- Area code: 717
- FIPS code: 42-87080
- GNIS feature ID: 1215773
- Website: https://yorkhavenborough.org/

York Haven is a borough in York County, Pennsylvania, United States. The population was 691 at the 2020 census. It is part of the York–Hanover metropolitan area. The borough is the home of the Brunner Island coal-fired electrical generation plant, located on the Susquehanna River on Wago Road and operated by PPL Corporation.

== Geography ==
According to the U.S. Census Bureau, the borough has a total area of 0.3 square miles (0.78 km^{2}), of which 0.04 square miles (0.10 km^{2}), or 5.88%, is water.

== Demographics ==
Historical population
Census	Pop.	Note	%±
1900	824		—
1910	793		−3.8%
1920	779		−1.8%
1930	770		−1.2%
1940	730		−5.2%
1950	743		1.8%
1960	736		−0.9%
1970	671		−8.8%
1980	746		11.2%
1990	758		1.6%
2000	809		6.7%
2010	709		−12.4%
2020	686		−3.2%
2021 (est.)	692	▲	0.9%

At the 2000 census there were 809 people, 278 households, and 197 families living in the borough. The population density was 2,531.8 inhabitants per square mile (977.5/km^{2}). There were 305 housing units at an average density of 954.5 per square mile (368.5/km^{2}). The racial makeup of the borough was 96.04% White, 0.74% African American, 0.37% Native American, 0.62% Asian, 0.12% from other races, and 2.10% from two or more races. Hispanic or Latino of any race were 1.24%.

Of the 278 households 48.9% had children under the age of 18 living with them, 48.6% were married couples living together, 14.7% had a female householder with no husband present, and 28.8% were non-families. 23.0% of households were one person and 6.8% were one person aged 65 or older. The average household size was 2.91 and the average family size was 3.40.

The age distribution was 36.7% under the age of 18, 8.8% from 18 to 24, 32.8% from 25 to 44, 15.8% from 45 to 64, and 5.9% 65 or older. The median age was 29 years. For every 100 females, there were 99.3 males. For every 100 females age 18 and over, there were 93.9 males. The median household income was $35,000 and the median family income was $32,917. Males had a median income of $29,375 versus $22,031 for females. The per capita income for the borough was $11,676. About 14.7% of families and 15.0% of the population were below the poverty line, including 17.0% of those under age 18 and none of those age 65 or over.

== Education ==
York Haven is served by the Northeastern York School District.
