= Cold Spring Lane station =

Light rail station in Baltimore, Maryland, US

Cold Spring Lane
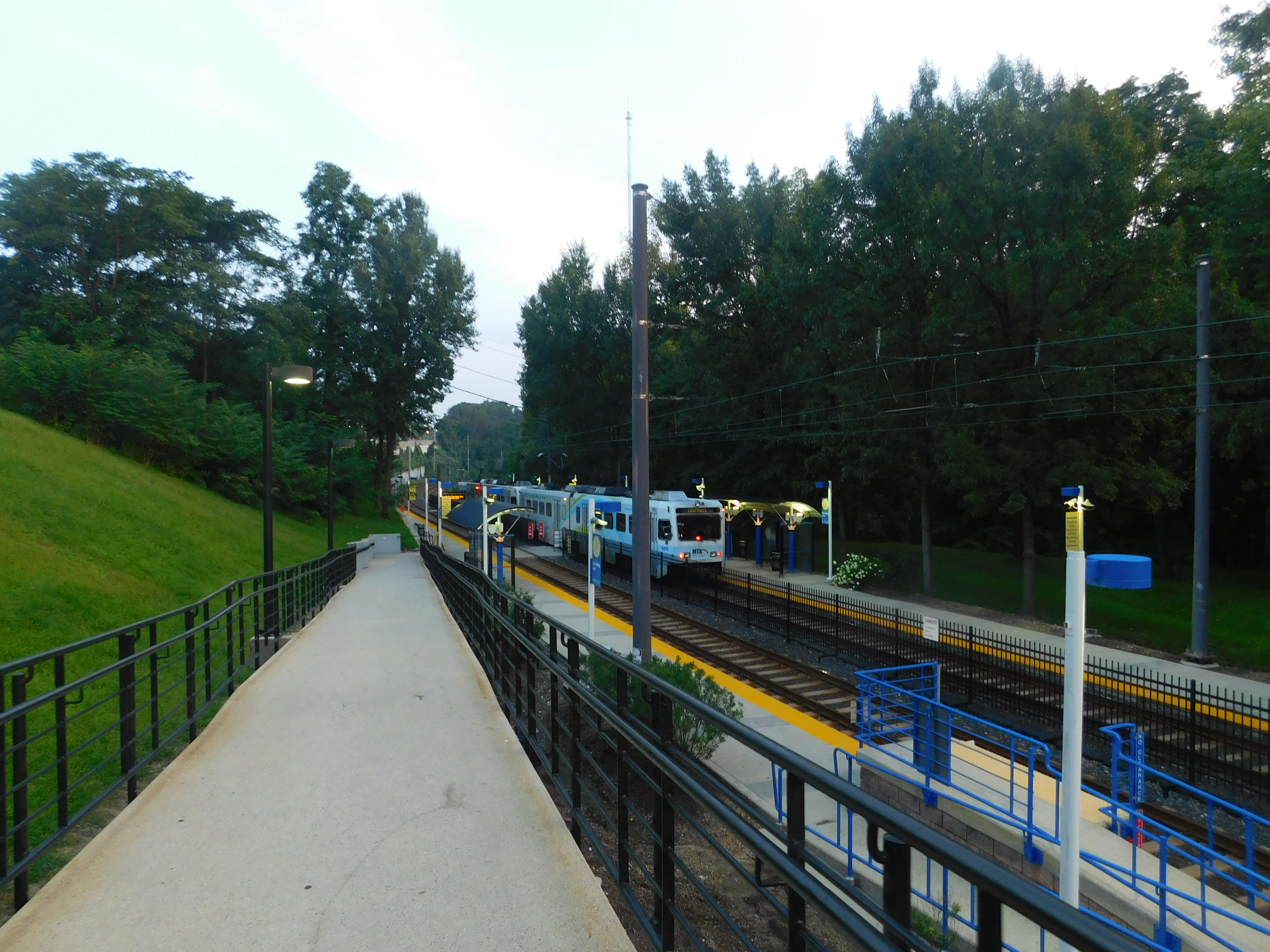
- A southbound train at Cold Spring Lane station in August 2018

General information
- Location: 1901 West Cold Spring Lane; Baltimore, Maryland
- Coordinates: 39°20′38.7″N 76°38′52.4″W
- Platforms: 2 side platforms
- Tracks: 2
- Connections: 33, 38; Jones Falls Trail

Construction
- Parking: No
- Accessible: Yes

History
- Opened: April 2, 1992

Passengers
- 2017: 588 daily

Services
Preceding station	Maryland Transit Administration	Following station
Woodberry toward BWI Airport or Glen Burnie	Light RailLink	Mt. Washington toward Hunt Valley
Location

Cold Spring Lane station is a light rail station on the Baltimore Light Rail system in the U.S. state of Maryland. The stop is located on Cold Spring Lane near the interchange with Interstate 83. The station has two side platforms serving two tracks.

The Cold Spring Lane stop is in close proximity to the former Melvale station of the Northern Central Railway, an affiliate of the Pennsylvania Railroad.

== Transit-oriented development ==
Following a 2012 proposal for a mixed-use transit-oriented development at 2001 West Cold Spring Lane near the Cold Spring Lane light rail station, the Baltimore Development Corporation (BDC) acquired a 16-acre parcel in the area in 2016. Following the land acquisition by BDC, developers Klein Enterprises and Manekin LLC announced the development of an apartment complex at the site, and in spring 2020 the construction of the 284-unit building named The Woodberry was completed. Adjacent to the Jones Falls stream north of the Woodberry neighborhood, the development aims to bring residents to an area with potentially advantageous transit links due to its proximity to the light rail line and the Jones Falls trail. However, the project has been met with criticism throughout the planning process and following its construction, with transit advocates highlighting poor connectivity to the Cold Spring Lane station, and the fact that it shares a name with the Woodberry station to the south rather than the station it is adjacent to.
