= Pennsylvania Route 181 =

State highway in Pennsylvania, US

Pennsylvania Route 181

Route information
- Maintained by PennDOT
- Length: 9.089 mi (14.627 km)
- Existed: 1961–present

Major junctions
- South end: I-83 BL / US 30 in North York
- I-83 / I-83 BL in North York; PA 238 in Emigsville; PA 921 in Manchester
- North end: PA 382 in York Haven

Location
- Country: United States
- State: Pennsylvania
- Counties: York

Highway system
- Pennsylvania State Route System; Interstate; US; State; Scenic; Legislative
← PA 180	→ PA 182

Pennsylvania Route 181 (PA 181) is a 9-mile-long (14 km) north–south state route in York County in south central Pennsylvania. Its southern terminus is at Interstate 83 Business (I-83 Bus.) and U.S. Route 30 (US 30) in North York. Its northern terminus is at the southern terminus of PA 382 in York Haven. PA 181 heads north from US 30 as a four-lane divided highway concurrent with I-83 Bus to an interchange with I-83, where I-83 Bus. reaches its northern terminus. From here, PA 181 continues north as a two-lane undivided road through suburban areas, intersecting PA 238 in Emigsville and PA 921 in Manchester. The route runs through rural land before it comes to York Haven.

The road between York and York Haven was designated as part of PA 24 in 1928. In the 1950s, US 111 Alternate (US 111 Alt.) became concurrent with PA 24 between York and I-83/US 111 in North York. PA 181 was designated between PA 250 (now US 30) in North York and PA 382 in York Haven in 1961 after the north end of PA 24 was truncated to east of York; I-83 Bus. also replaced US 111 Alt. The section of the route between US 30 and I-83 became a divided highway in 2003.

== Route description ==
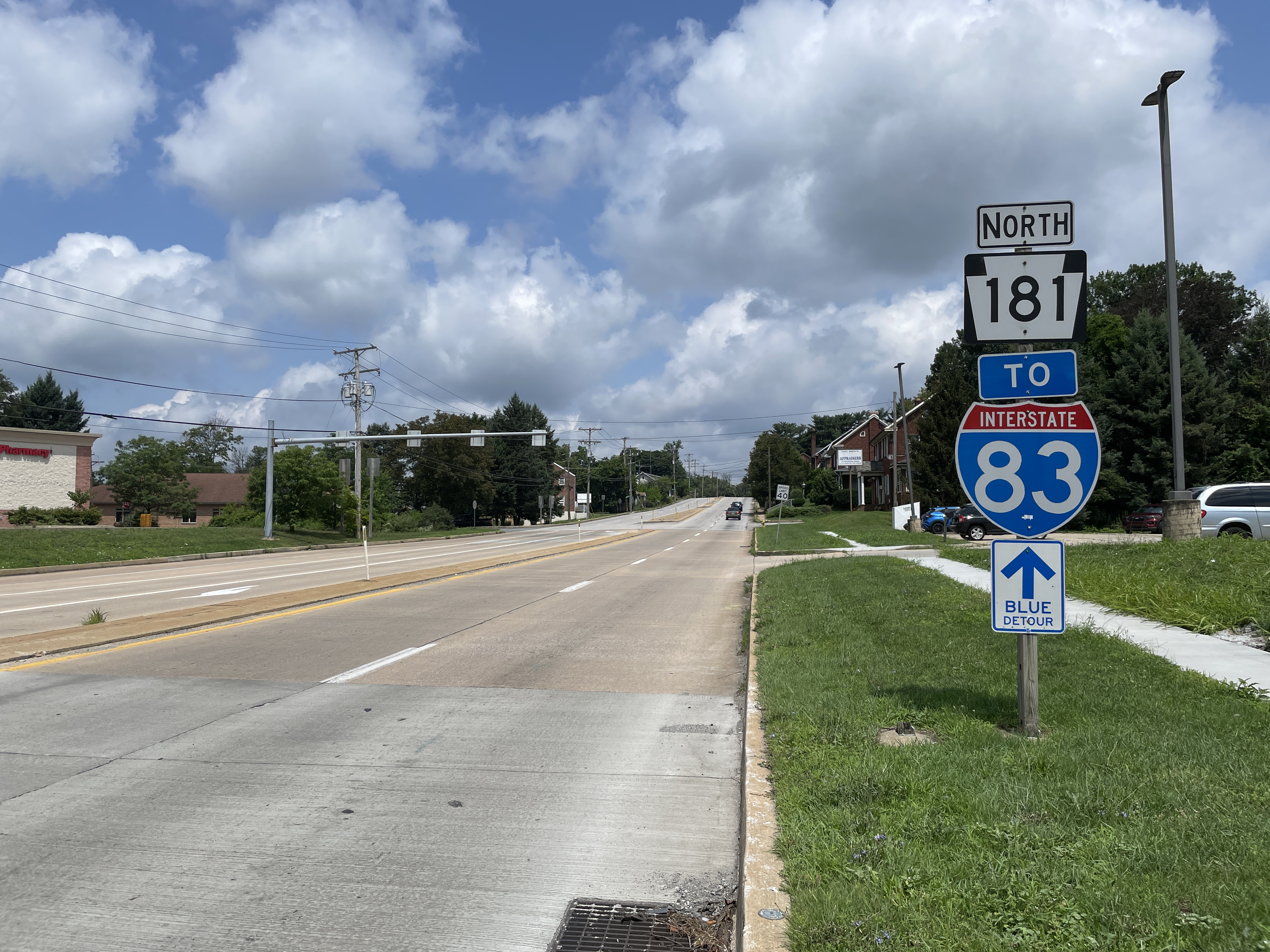
PA 181 northbound past US 30 in Manchester Township

PA 181 begins at an intersection with US 30 in Manchester Township, heading north concurrent with I-83 Bus. on North George Street, a four-lane divided highway. South of US 30, I-83 Bus. continues south toward the borough of North York. The road passes businesses before heading into residential areas. The highway runs past more commercial establishments as it comes to an interchange with I-83. At this point, I-83 Bus. ends and PA 181 continues north, narrowing into a two-lane undivided road as it passes a mix of residences and businesses. The route heads through the community of Emigsville and comes to an intersection with PA 238, at which point the route runs a short distance to the west of Norfolk Southern's York Secondary railroad line. Past this junction, the road enters more wooded surroundings and continues into East Manchester Township, where it becomes North George Street Extended. Here, PA 181 runs farther to the west of the railroad tracks and passes industrial and commercial establishments. The route enters the borough of Manchester and becomes Main Street as it is lined with homes.

PA 181 forms a concurrency with PA 921 as the road passes residences and businesses in the center of town before PA 921 turns east onto Maple Street. After this, the route enters residential areas, crossing back into East Manchester Township and becoming North George Street Extended again. The road enters wooded areas of homes before it crosses the Conewago Creek into Newberry Township, where the road name becomes York Haven Road. The road passes more housing developments before entering a mix of farms and woods. PA 181 continues into the borough of York Haven and becomes Front Street as it passes more homes and turns west onto Pennsylvania Avenue before coming to its northern terminus at an intersection with the southern terminus of PA 382.

== History ==
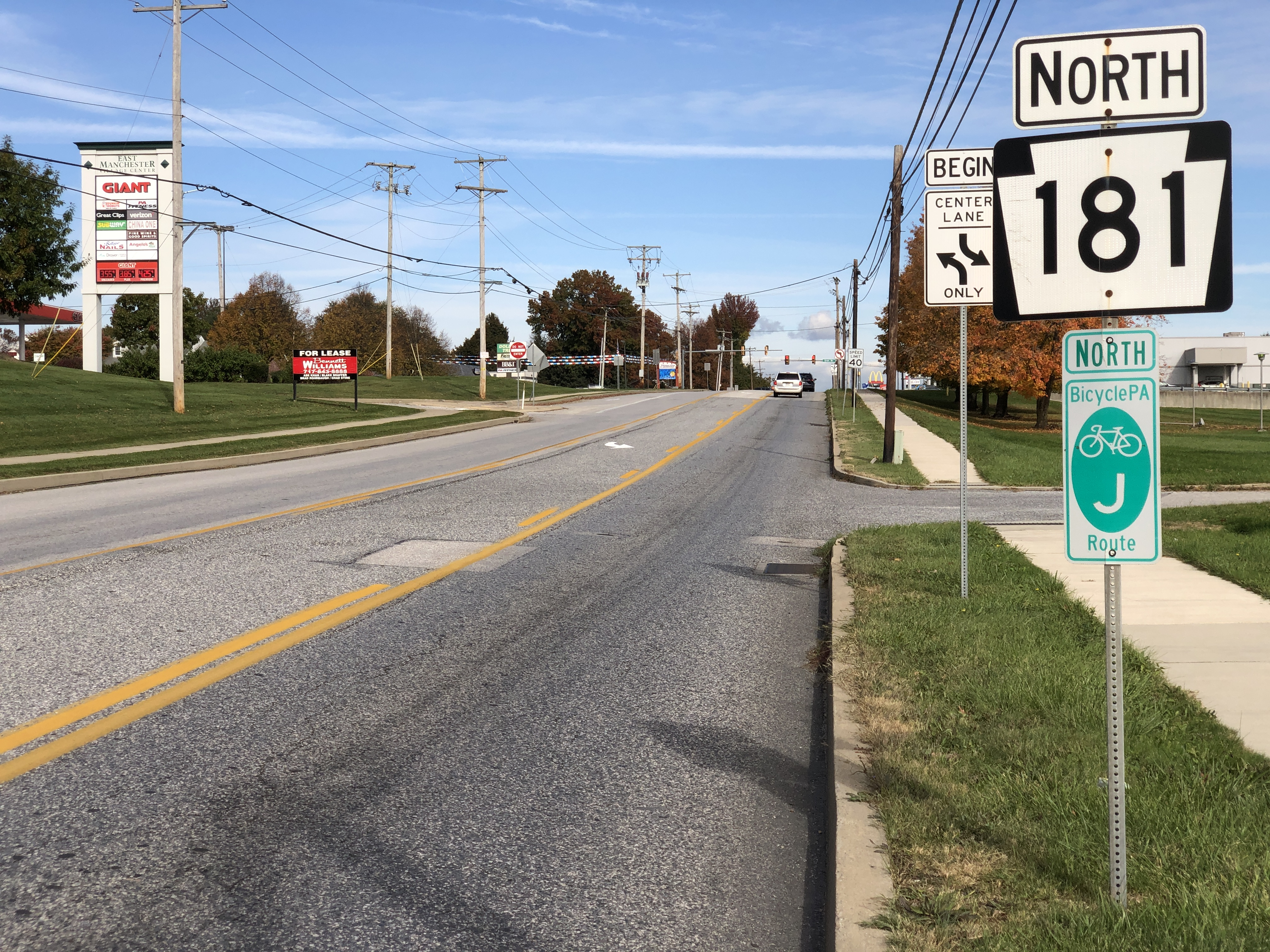
PA 181 northbound in East Manchester Township

When Pennsylvania legislated routes in 1911, what is now PA 181 was the southern portion of Legislative Route 250, which ran between York and the Harrisburg area. In 1928, the road between York and York Haven became a part of PA 24, a route which ran between the Maryland border and New Cumberland. The section of the route between York and York Haven was a paved road. In the 1950s, US 111 Alt. was designated concurrent with PA 24 between York and the interchange with I-83/US 111 in North York. In 1961, the northern terminus of PA 24 was cut back to east of York, and PA 181 replaced the PA 24 designation between PA 250 (now US 30) in North York and PA 382 in York Haven. In addition, I-83 Bus. replaced the US 111 Alt. designation concurrent with PA 181 south of the I-83 interchange. This change was made as part of the construction of I-83 in order to provide a numbered route at each interchange. In 2003, PA 181 was widened into a divided highway between US 30 and I-83.

== Major intersections ==
The entire route is in York County.

Location	mi	km	Destinations	Notes
Manchester Township	0.000	0.000	I-83 BL south (George Street) / US 30 (Arsenal Road) – York, Lancaster, Gettysburg	Southern terminus; south end of I-83 Bus. concurrency
Manchester Township	0.566	0.911	I-83 – Harrisburg, Baltimore I-83 BL ends	Exit 22 (I-83); north end of I-83 Bus. concurrency
Manchester Township	2.852	4.590	PA 238 west (Church Road) to I-83	Eastern terminus of PA 238
Manchester	4.947	7.961	PA 921 west (Musser Street)	South end of PA 921 concurrency
Manchester	5.368	8.639	PA 921 east (Maple Street)	North end of PA 921 concurrency
York Haven	9.089	14.627	PA 382 north (Landvale Street) – Newberrytown	Northern terminus; southern terminus of PA 382
1.000 mi = 1.609 km; 1.000 km = 0.621 mi: Concurrency terminus
