= Pennsylvania Route 921 =

State highway in York County, Pennsylvania, US

Pennsylvania Route 921

Route information
- Maintained by PennDOT
- Length: 9.831 mi (15.821 km)
- Existed: 1928–present

Major junctions
- West end: PA 74 in Dover
- PA 297 in Conewago Township; PA 181 in Manchester
- East end: PA 24 in Mount Wolf

Location
- Country: United States
- State: Pennsylvania
- Counties: York

Highway system
- Pennsylvania State Route System; Interstate; US; State; Scenic; Legislative
← PA 920	→ PA 922

Pennsylvania Route 921 (PA 921) is a 10-mile-long (16 km) state highway located in York County, Pennsylvania. The western terminus is at PA 74 in Dover. The eastern terminus is at PA 24 in Mount Wolf. The route is a two-lane undivided road that runs through rural areas and suburban development to the north of York. PA 921 heads northeast from Dover and intersects the southern terminus of PA 297 before it reaches Manchester, where it forms a concurrency with PA 181. From here, the route continues east to its terminus in Mount Wolf. PA 921 was designated in 1928 between PA 24 (now PA 181) in Manchester and Mount Wolf. The route was extended west to PA 74 in Dover in the 1940s. PA 24 was extended from east of York to intersect PA 921 at its terminus in Mount Wolf in the 1970s.

== Route description ==
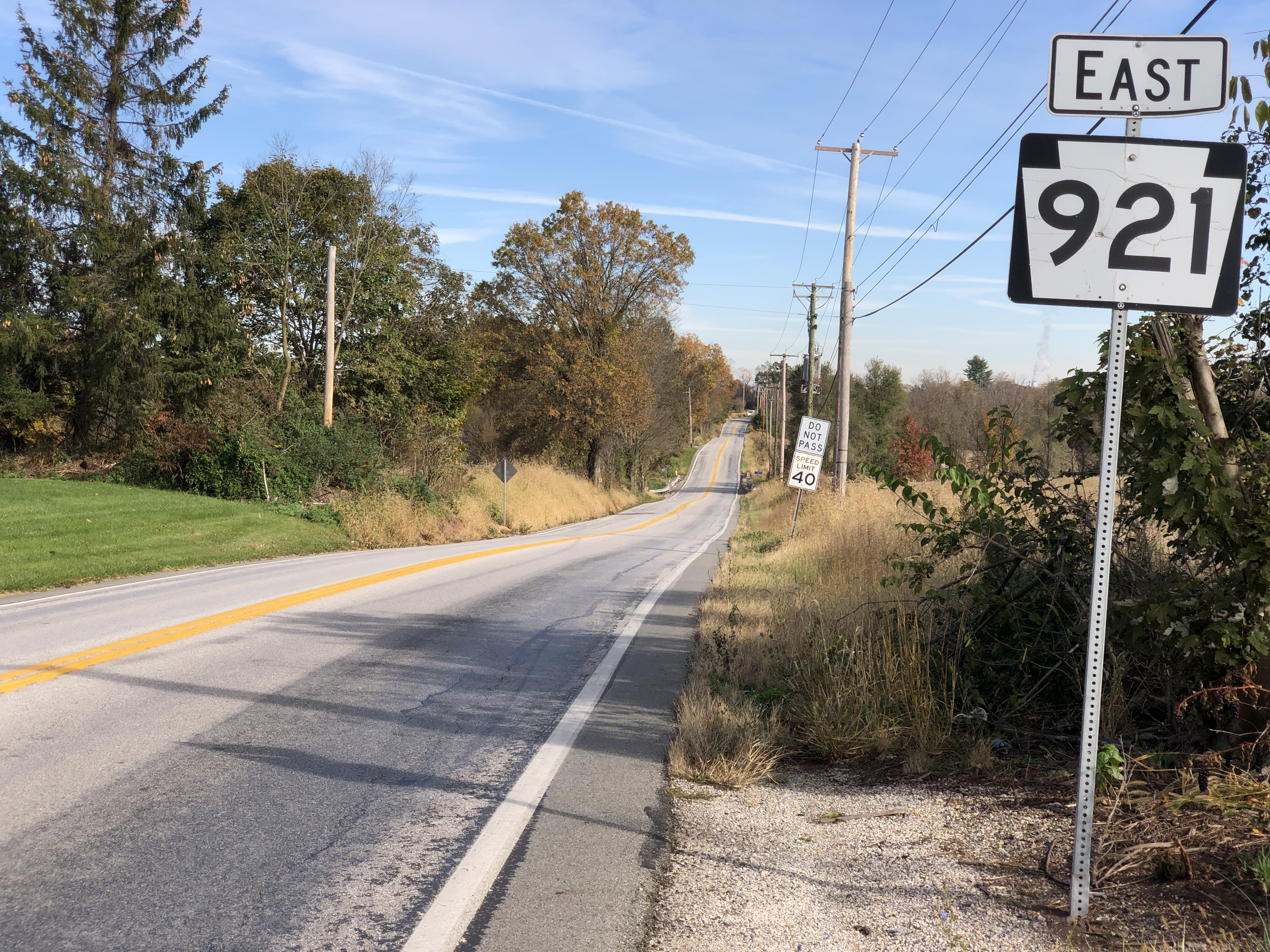
PA 921 eastbound in Conewago Township

PA 921 begins at an intersection with PA 74 in the borough of Dover, heading northeast on two-lane undivided Canal Road. The road passes a mix of homes and businesses before turning east and becoming the border between Dover to the north and Dover Township to the south, passing residential subdivisions. The route fully enters Dover Township as it turns northeast into wooded areas of homes before passing a mix of farmland and residences. Upon crossing Bull Road, PA 921 heads into Conewago Township and passes more agricultural areas with some patches of woods and housing. The road intersects PA 297 in the community of Zions View, where it makes a turn to the east and crosses the Little Conewago Creek, becoming the border between East Manchester Township to the north and Manchester Township to the south as it passes under Interstate 83. Immediately after, PA 921 turns northeast into East Manchester Township and passes farm fields.

The road turns southeast onto Zions View Road and passes more areas of agriculture before entering the borough of Manchester and becoming Musser Street. Here, PA 921 passes homes before it turns north to form a concurrency with PA 181 on Main Street. The two routes pass residences and businesses in the center of town before PA 921 splits from PA 181 by heading east on Maple Street. The road passes more residences and continues into the borough of Mount Wolf. Here, PA 921 crosses Norfolk Southern's York Secondary railroad line and turns southeast to reach its eastern terminus at the northern terminus of PA 24.

== History ==
When Pennsylvania legislated routes in 1911, what is now PA 921 was not given a number. PA 921 was designated in 1928 to run from PA 24 (now PA 181) in Manchester east to Mount Wolf. The western and eastern portions of the route were paved while the middle section was unpaved. By 1930, the entire length of PA 921 between Manchester and Mount Wolf was paved. The unnumbered road between Dover and Manchester was paved in the 1930s. In the 1940s, PA 921 was extended west from Manchester to PA 74 in Dover. PA 24 was extended from east of York to reach its northern terminus at PA 921's eastern terminus in Mount Wolf in the 1970s.

== Major intersections ==
The entire route is in York County.

Location	mi	km	Destinations	Notes
Dover	0.000	0.000	PA 74 (Main Street)	Western terminus
Conewago Township	5.695	9.165	PA 297 north (Susquehanna Trail)	Southern terminus of PA 297
Manchester	8.534	13.734	PA 181 south (Main Street) – York	West end of PA 181 overlap
Manchester	8.955	14.412	PA 181 north (Main Street) – York Haven	East end of PA 181 overlap
Mount Wolf	9.831	15.821	PA 24 south (Center Street)	Eastern terminus; northern terminus of PA 24
1.000 mi = 1.609 km; 1.000 km = 0.621 mi: Concurrency terminus
