= Ashippun River =

River in Wisconsin, United States

Coordinates: 43°10′14″N 88°33′14″W

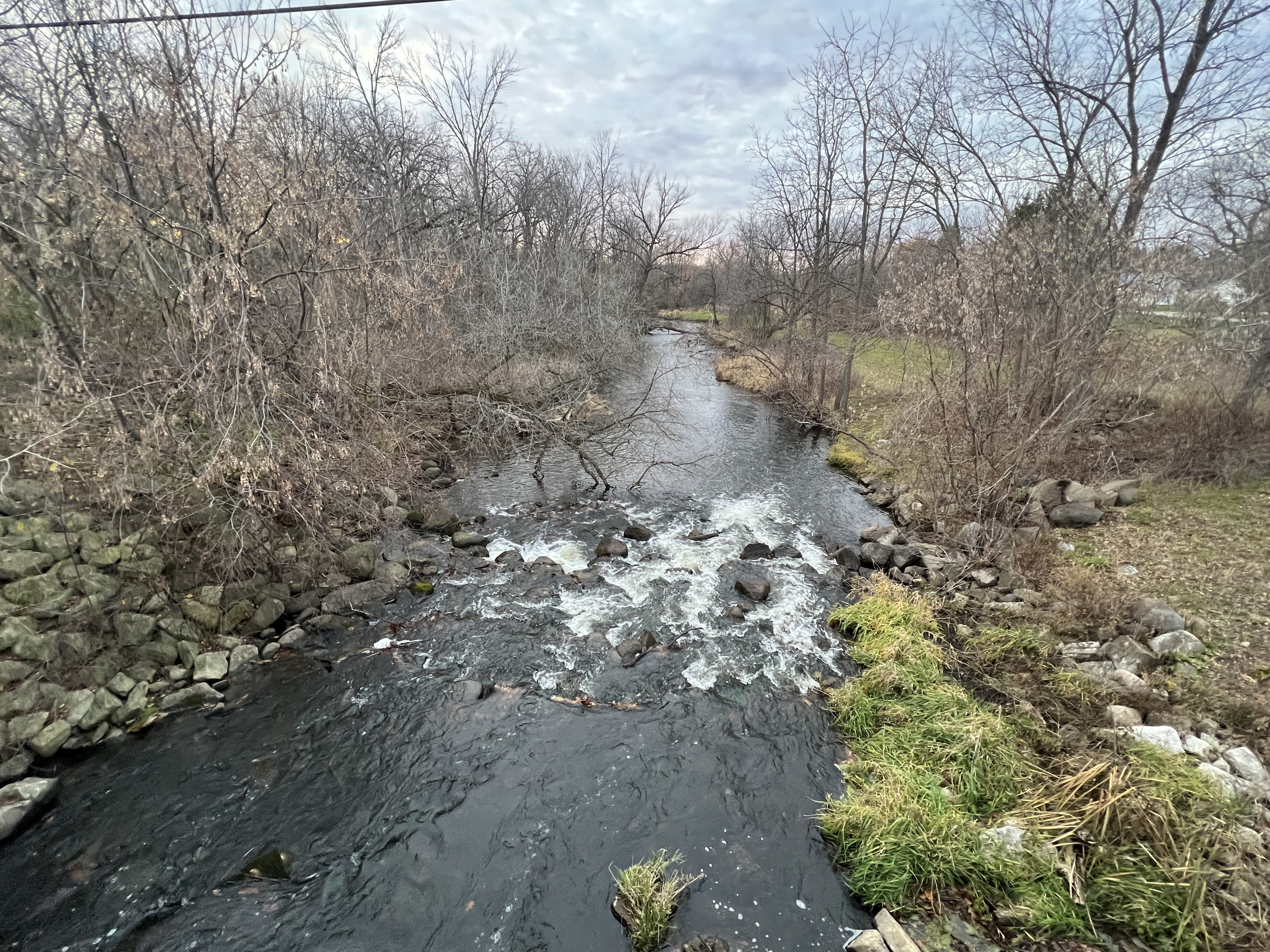

Location
- Country: United States
- State: Wisconsin

The Ashippun River is a 33.2-mile-long (53.4 km) tributary of the Rock River in southeastern Wisconsin in the United States. The Ashippun's watershed lies in Dodge, Washington and Waukesha counties. Its tributaries include Mud Run, Dawson Creek and Davey Creek.

== Description ==
From its headwaters in a small wetland and agricultural area, the Ashippun River flows southwest through Druid Lake to the Rock River. There are 12 intermittent and 5 perennial tributaries to the Ashippun River. It has a low gradient of 6 feet (1.8 m) per mile.

== Fishing ==
An impoundment at Monterey and several structures upstream have created water and fishery qualities similar to those of a lake. Northern pike and bass offer limited fishing. In addition, the river has been found to contain the rare Least Darter (Etheostoma microperca). Carp are also available in quantity.
