= Interstate 283 =

Highway in Pennsylvania

Interstate 283
- I-283 highlighted in red

Route information
- Auxiliary route of I-83
- Maintained by PennDOT
- Length: 2.91 mi (4.68 km)
- Existed: 1972–present
- NHS: Entire route

Major junctions
- South end: I-76 Toll / Penna Turnpike / PA 283 in Lower Swatara Township
- PA 441 in Swatara Township
- North end: I-83 / US 322 in Swatara Township

Location
- Country: United States
- State: Pennsylvania
- Counties: Dauphin

Highway system
- Interstate Highway System; Main; Auxiliary; Suffixed; Business; Future; Pennsylvania State Route System; Interstate; US; State; Scenic; Legislative
← PA 282	→ PA 283

Interstate 283 (I-283) is an auxiliary route of the Interstate Highway System located just east of Harrisburg, Pennsylvania. It travels from the Harrisburg East interchange of the Pennsylvania Turnpike (I-76) north to I-83/U.S. Route 322 (US 322, Capital Beltway) at the Eisenhower Interchange. Pennsylvania Route 283 (PA 283, officially designated as SR 300 because of I-283) continues southeast from near the southern terminus of I-283 to Lancaster as a freeway, functioning as an extension of the Interstate, though they are two separate roads.

== Route description ==
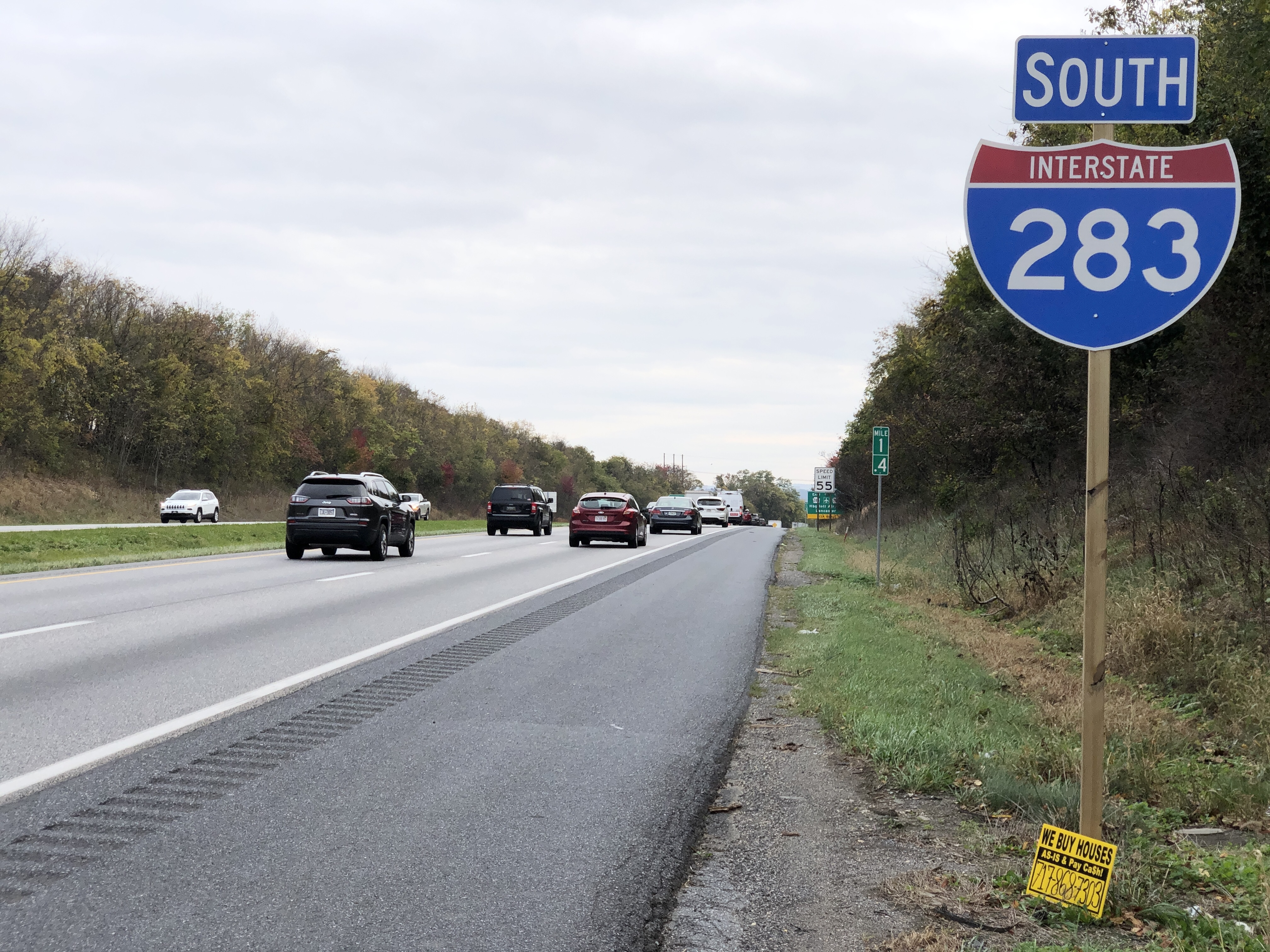
I-283 southbound past PA 441 in Swatara Township

I-283 begins at the Harrisburg East interchange of I-76 (Pennsylvania Turnpike) in Lower Swatara Township, Dauphin County; this interchange is a trumpet interchange. Past the interchange toll plaza, the road continues north and immediately reaches a partial cloverleaf interchange with the PA 283 freeway that also has access to PA 230 via Eisenhower Boulevard. I-283 continues north-northwest as a four-lane freeway, running past business parks before entering areas of farms and woods, crossing into Swatara Township. The road enters commercial areas as it comes to a diamond interchange with PA 441. After that exit, the road continues northwest before turning north and passing an industrial park. I-283 comes to its northern terminus at the Eisenhower Interchange with I-83/US 322 (Capital Beltway), at which point the freeway continues north as part of I-83 northbound/US 322 westbound along the Capital Beltway while I-83 southbound heads west along the Capital Beltway and US 322 eastbound heads east on a freeway.

== History ==
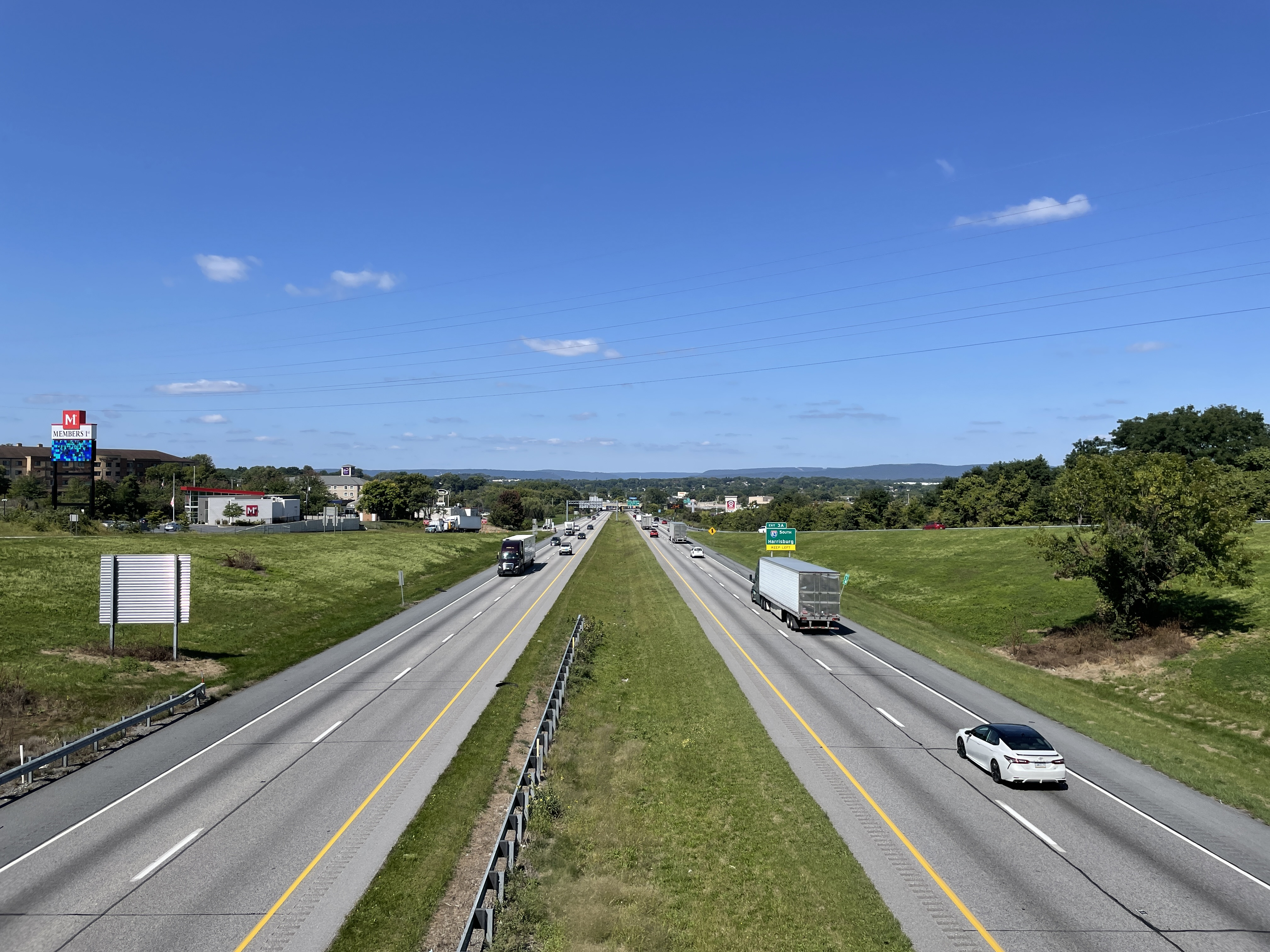
I-283 northbound at the PA 441 interchange in Swatara Township

Construction began on I-283 in 1968. Previously, the Harrisburg East interchange of the Pennsylvania Turnpike connected directly to Eisenhower Boulevard. The section from the turnpike to PA 441 opened in 1970 and included a short portion of what is now PA 283, connecting Eisenhower Boulevard to the exit 1 cloverleaf. The next year, the Eisenhower Interchange opened to traffic along with the remaining section of Interstate.

As part of a project to reconstruct six miles (9.7 km) of PA 283, the interchange between I-283 and PA 283 was overhauled. The ramp from westbound PA 283 and northbound I-283 was widened to two lanes, and the loop ramp from westbound PA 283 to southbound I-283 toward the Pennsylvania Turnpike toll plaza was removed and replaced with a left turn and a traffic signal. This eliminated the problem of traffic weaving between the aforementioned loop ramp and the heavily-traveled loop ramp from southbound I-283 to eastbound PA 283. The project was completed in late 2020.

== Exit list ==
The entire route is in Dauphin County.

Location	mi	km	Old exit	New exit	Destinations	Notes
Lower Swatara Township	0.000	0.000	–	–	I-76 Toll / Penna Turnpike – Philadelphia, Pittsburgh	Southern terminus; exit 247 on I-76 / Turnpike
Lower Swatara Township			Harrisburg East Toll Plaza			
Lower Swatara Township	0.016	0.026	2	1	PA 283 east to PA 230 – Harrisburg International Airport, Lancaster, Highspire	Signed as exits 1A (PA 283) and 1B (PA 230); access to PA 230 via S. Eisenhower Blvd; last southbound exit before toll
Swatara Township	1.860	2.993	1	2	PA 441 – Swatara	
Swatara Township	2.907	4.678	–	3	I-83 / US 322 to I-81 – Harrisburg, Hazleton, State College, Hershey	Northern terminus; signed as exits 3C (US 322 east), 3B (I-83 north/US 322 west) and 3A (I-83 south); exit 46A on I-83
1.000 mi = 1.609 km; 1.000 km = 0.621 mi: Electronic toll collection
