= Jones Falls Trail =

Hiking and bicycling trail in Baltimore, Maryland, United States

Coordinates: 39.31748°N 76.631572°W

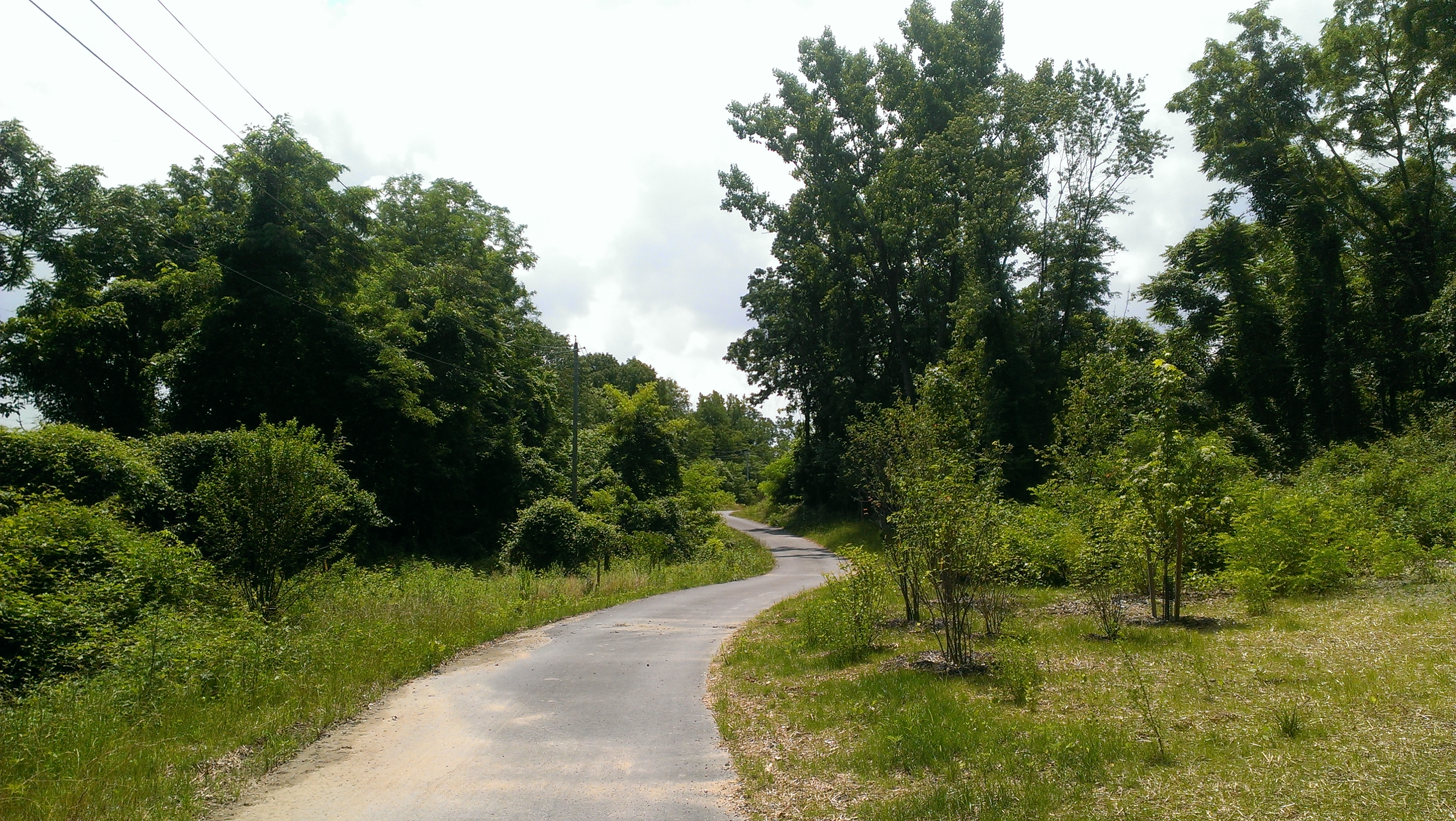
- The Jones Falls Trail between Woodberry and Cold Spring Lane, opened 2013
- Location: Baltimore, Maryland
- Established: 1999
- Trailheads: Mount Washington; Cylburn Arboretum; Inner Harbor/Visitors Center Penn Station; Stieff Silver Druid Hill Park
- Use: Bicycling, hiking
- Difficulty: Easy
- Season: Year-round
- Months: Year-round
- Surface: Asphalt, concrete

Jones Falls Trail (typically abbreviated JFT) is a hiking and bicycling trail in Baltimore, Maryland. It mostly runs along the length of the namesake Jones Falls, a major north–south stream in and north of the city that has long acted as a major transportation corridor for the city. It also incorporates the bike path encircling Druid Hill Reservoir and its namesake park. The Jones Falls Trail forms a segment of the East Coast Greenway, a partially completed network of off-road bicycling routes that runs the length of the East Coast.

It is projected to extend from the Baltimore waterfront at the Inner Harbor north to the Mount Washington neighborhood, passing through Cylburn Arboretum and Mount Washington Arboretum. The Baltimore City Department of Recreation and Parks owns, manages, and maintains the trail.

== Route description ==
At present, the Jones Falls Trail begins in downtown Baltimore and winds its way north to the Cylburn neighborhood. It has on-street sections, paths parallel to city streets, and unique alignments.

=== Currently open ===
The trail begins by running along a segregated path along the west side of the Inner Harbor, alongside Light Street and beginning at the Conway Street intersection; the sidepath continues south from there as part of the Gwynns Falls Trail. The parallel trail transitions to Pratt Street and continues eastward to Market Street, where it ends; the Jones Falls Trail then turns north onto Market Street on a wide sidewalk. The trail then turns east onto the north sidewalk of Lombard Street, then north again along the west bank of the namesake Jones Falls. As it then meets President Street, it turns north once again after crossing said street, continuing on the eastern sidewalk.

The Trail then meets an alignment that follows the Fallsway. It follows to the west until it meets Madison Street, at which point the Trail alignment switches to the east side of the street. Fallsway passes over I-83 and merges with Guilford Avenue, then curves to the west and becomes Mount Royal Avenue; the trail continues around with it, while Guilford Avenue continues to the north as a bike boulevard. Upon reaching Saint Paul Street, the Trail turns north along the street's east side, passing over the Jones Falls once more and passing to the east of Penn Station. The Jones Falls Trail then turns west onto Lanvale Street, following the south sidewalk, although the street also possesses sharrows and the one-way section east of Charles Street has a contraflow bike lane.

After crossing Maryland Avenue, the Jones Falls Trail follows Falls Road's sidewalk into the Jones Falls Valley, passing underneath the bridges Howard Street and North Avenue use to cross the valley. After passing the Baltimore Streetcar Museum, the Trail returns to the west side of the road, separated from MD 25 by a reverse barrier and trees, running right against the bank of the Jones Falls. This alignment continues until it passes underneath the 29th Street Bridge the Trail then climbs up a relatively steep grade, crosses the street once more, and rises out of the valley on a switchback, joining Wyman Park Drive. The Trail turns west here, passing high over the Jones Falls once more and crossing I-83 once again, continuing to climb out of the valley as it approaches Druid Hill Park.

In Druid Hill Park, the Jones Falls Trail includes the entire loop road around Druid Lake Reservoir, a bike path that runs clockwise around it. The trail enters from the northeast side and exits to the northwest of the lake, climbing as it loops around to the west and then south, meeting Beechwood Drive and continuing north along the street's east side. Going along this route, the trail passes by the Maryland Zoo, where the trail leaves the sidepath route and follows its own alignment once more, entering a heavily wooded area. It features a number of sharp curves, branching paths, and two switchbacks as it descends toward Woodberry.

In Woodberry, the Jones Falls Trail becomes an on-street route once more, entering on Parkdale Avenue. It turns immediately to the right onto Clipper Park Road, utilizing its entire length to Clipper Road. Here, the East Coast Greenway separates from the Jones Falls Trail; the trail turns to the north, while the greenway's route turns south. This intersection is also nearby the Woodberry station. Clipper Road becomes one-way to motor vehicles, but the trail continues in both directions. The trail then separates from the road once again, entering another heavily wooded area. It continues up to Cold Spring Lane and turns west to the crosswalk at Tamarind Road.

Beyond here, the Jones Falls Trail continues to the north at Tamarind Road, following its own unique alignment just to the east of the street. It continues up to Springarden Drive, running to the north of that street with street lights running down the center of the path, before turning onto Greenspring Avenue and running to Cylburn Avenue, next to the entrance of Cylburn Arboretum. After crossing Cylburn Ave, the trail ascends on its own alignment and eventually crosses Northern Parkway on a bridge. It then follows Rogers Ave until Wildwood Lane and from there curves Northward on its own alignment, into a segment that mostly consists of boardwalk. That segment eventually leads into Newbury Street and ends at Kelly Avenue, close to Mount Washington Light Rail Station. A connecting piece of trail follows Kelly Avenue west until Pimlico Road.

=== Future construction ===
Baltimore City and Baltimore County have expressed interest in an extension of the trail to connect it to Falls Road station, allowing access to Roland Park via the existing boardwalk. In 2021, a study by the Baltimore City Department of Transportation recommended that extension.

A proposal to extend the greenway west to Fallstaff Road, near Park Heights Avenue, was rejected in 2005.

== History ==
The Jones Falls Trail was conceived in the late 1990s. Construction, however, began later. The Trail is still under construction, with its schedule broken into five phases.

Phase I is the oldest section of the Jones Falls Trail, a 1.6-mile (2.6 km) stretch from Penn Station to Druid Hill Park completed in 2004.

Phase II is the 2.5-mile (4.0 km) long stretch between Penn Station and the Inner Harbor. This phase included reconstruction of the abandoned streetcar right-of-way used by the trail on Pratt Street into a full-fledged bike path, although this section was already being used as a bike path shortly before its reconstruction. It also included the widening of several sidewalks, including the east sidewalk of Saint Paul Street and the east sidewalk of President Street south of Fayette. A lane was removed from Guilford Avenue and Fallsway to form a segregated bicycle path, and another lane was taken from Lombard Street to widen the sidewalk into a trail with trees down the center. Most of the rest of the trail was designated on existing city sidewalks, though sidewalk ramps were widened and the "Jones Falls Trail" logo was added. This phase was completed in early 2013.

Phase III, the 2.75-mile (4.43 km) stretch between Druid Hill Park and the Woodberry Light Rail stop, was completed in 2008. It is the second-oldest section of the Jones Falls Trail.

Phase IV is 1.25 miles (2.01 km) long, extending north from the Woodberry Light Rail station to Cylburn Avenue, just beyond Cylburn Arboretum's entrance. This phase began while Phase II was still under construction. It included reconstruction of an old road between Clipper Mill Road and Cold Spring Lane into a bicycle path, and a new alignment was constructed north of Cold Spring to Springarden Drive. The north sidewalk of Springarden Drive and the east sidewalk of Greenspring Avenue were widened for the trail, and Gillespie Square, a short road stub extending east from Springarden Drive, was removed. Projected to be complete in December 2012, construction was delayed, and completion was pushed back until August 2013. Signage for the entire Jones Falls Trail was also replaced late in 2013.

Phase V, 4.25 miles (6.84 km) long, connects Cylburn Arboretum with the Mount Washington Light Rail Station, and also connects Western Run Park to the trail via the Western Run Spur. This will include a wooden bridge that will pass over Northern Parkway. Construction was expected to begin in September 2014 and most aspects of construction were completed in 2020. This trail extension was expected to cost $2.2 million. The Western Run Greenway travels west to Greenspring Avenue near the intersection with Kelly Avenue, following the south bank of the namesake Western Run.
