= Greater Baltimore Committee =

Baltimore economic development organization

Founded in 1955, the Greater Baltimore Committee is the primary economic development organization for the city of Baltimore as well as the five surrounding counties. This jurisdiction includes Anne Arundel, Baltimore, Carroll, Harford and Howard counties. It currently comprises more than 500 organizations, including large, mid-size, and small companies, nonprofits, foundations, and educational and healthcare institutions. GBC is dedicated to fostering the prosperity of the Greater Baltimore region.

== Origins ==
The Greater Baltimore Committee was founded in 1955 by a group of 83 Baltimore-based business owners. Among those founders were Frances H. Morton and James W. Rouse who saw Baltimore's struggles at the time and wanted to create a visionary organization to combat them. Its first Executive Director was David F. Woods.

In 1955, the committee pushed for legislation to build the Jones Falls Expressway.

Other GBC projects completed around this time include:

- Charles Center Plan
- Friendship Airport
- Baltimore Civic Center
- Maryland Port Authority
- Mass Transit Administration

== History ==
During the 1950s and 1960s, GBC would also play a role in the redevelopment of Baltimore's iconic Inner Harbor. Later on, the organization would turn its attention to address quality of life issues like education to ensure that Baltimore was also developing a generation of future leaders. In 1978, GBC merged with Chamber of Commerce of Metropolitan Baltimore to create a single vision for the greater metropolitan region. Into the 1980s, GBC would continue to play a role in education with the development of projects like the CollegeBound Foundation. By the 2000s, it was beginning to turn its attention to developing industries like healthcare, financial services, and biotech.

In 2022, GBC merged with the Economic Alliance of Greater Baltimore and hired new leadership for the first time in more than two decades. Mark Anthony Thomas was brought in as President & CEO of the organization in December 2022 and assembled a mostly-new staff of researchers, strategists, events programmers, and communications professionals.

In May 2023, GBC announced a 12-point multi-year agenda oriented around economic opportunity, transportation & infrastructure, and collective impact. GBC also formed a tech consortium consisting of 38 leading organizations in biotech and predictive healthcare to submit a bid to become a federally designated Tech Hub. This bid was one of only 31 selected by the Biden-Harris Administration for approval, and giving Baltimore an opportunity to become a global leader in biotech.
