= Pennsylvania Route 238 =

State highway in York County, Pennsylvania, US

Pennsylvania Route 238

Route information
- Maintained by PennDOT and West Manchester Township
- Length: 5.396 mi (8.684 km)
- Existed: 1961–present

Major junctions
- West end: PA 74 in Shiloh
- I-83 in Emigsville
- East end: PA 181 in Emigsville

Location
- Country: United States
- State: Pennsylvania
- Counties: York

Highway system
- Pennsylvania State Route System; Interstate; US; State; Scenic; Legislative
← PA 237	→ PA 239

Pennsylvania Route 238 (PA 238) is a state highway located entirely in York County, Pennsylvania. The western terminus of the route is at PA 74 in Shiloh. The eastern terminus is at PA 181 in Emigsville. PA 238 is a two-lane undivided road passing through suburban and rural areas to the northwest of York. The route has an interchange with Interstate 83 (I-83) at exit 24 in Emigsville. The road between Shiloh and Emigsville was paved in the 1930s. PA 238 was assigned to its current alignment in the 1960s.

== Route description ==
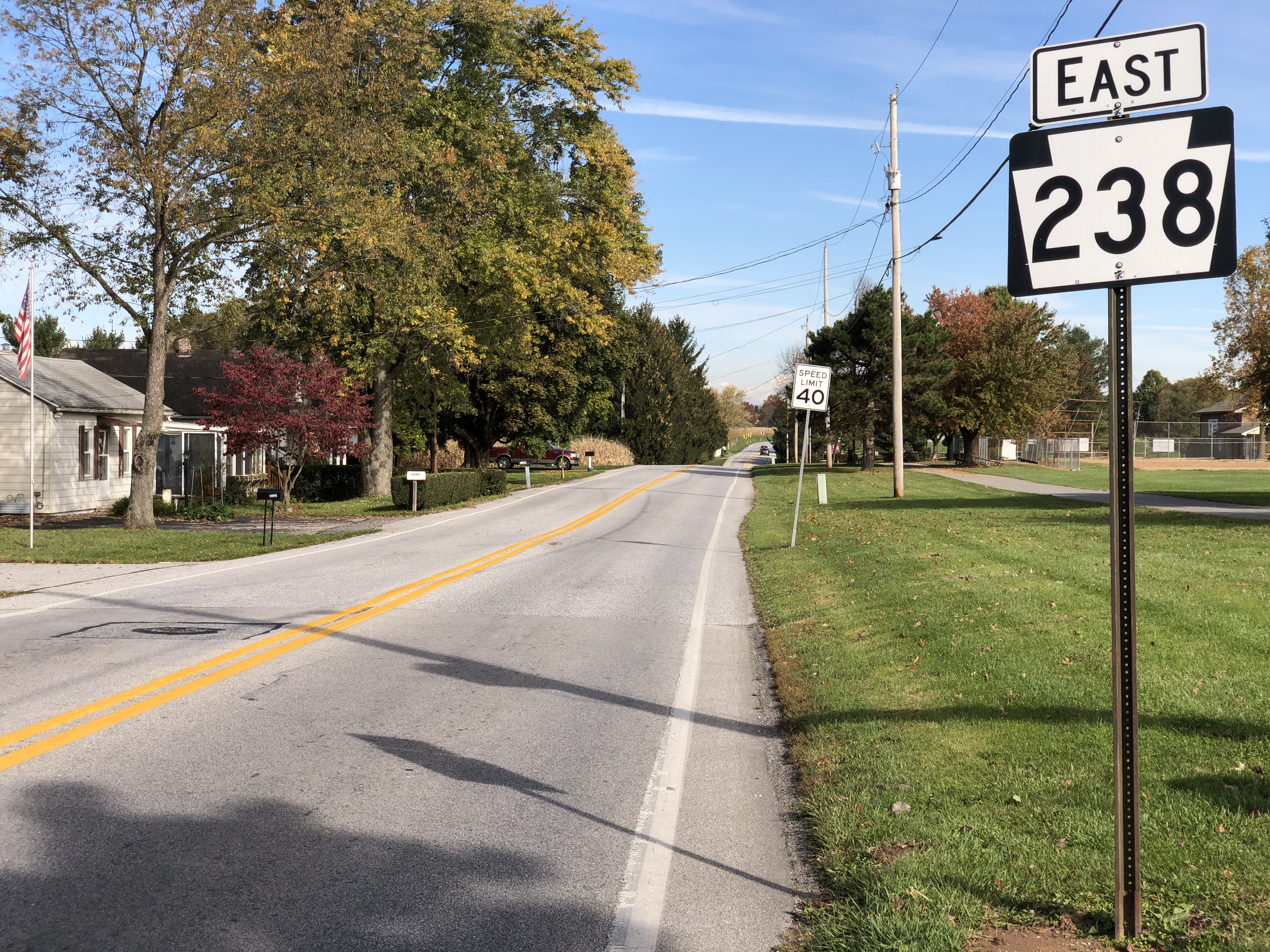
PA 238 eastbound in Foustown

PA 238 begins at an intersection with PA 74 in the community of Shiloh in West Manchester Township, heading northeast on two-lane undivided Church Road past homes. The road crosses into Manchester Township at the Roosevelt Avenue intersection, passing through a mix of farmland and housing developments, passing through Foustown. Farther northeast, the route passes through Roundtown prior to turning east onto Farmtrail Road. At this point, PA 238 passes commercial development and becomes Church Road again before reaching an interchange with I-83. A park and ride lot is located northeast of this interchange. After this interchange, the route continues past homes and industrial development to its eastern terminus at PA 181 in the community of Emigsville.

== History ==
When routes were first legislated in Pennsylvania in 1911, the present-day alignment of PA 238 was not assigned a number. By 1926, the current route was an unnumbered, unpaved road. The present-day route was paved in the 1930s. PA 238 was designated in the 1960s to follow its current alignment between PA 74 in Shiloh and PA 181 in Emigsville, with an interchange at I-83 to the west of Emigsville.

== Major intersections ==
The entire route is in York County.

Location	mi	km	Destinations	Notes
West Manchester Township	0.000	0.000	PA 74 (Carlisle Road)	Western terminus
Manchester Township	4.585	7.379	I-83 – York, Harrisburg	Exit 24 (I-83)
Manchester Township	5.396	8.684	PA 181 (George Street)	Eastern terminus
1.000 mi = 1.609 km; 1.000 km = 0.621 mi
