= Woodberry station =

Baltimore Light Rail station in Baltimore, Maryland, US

Woodberry
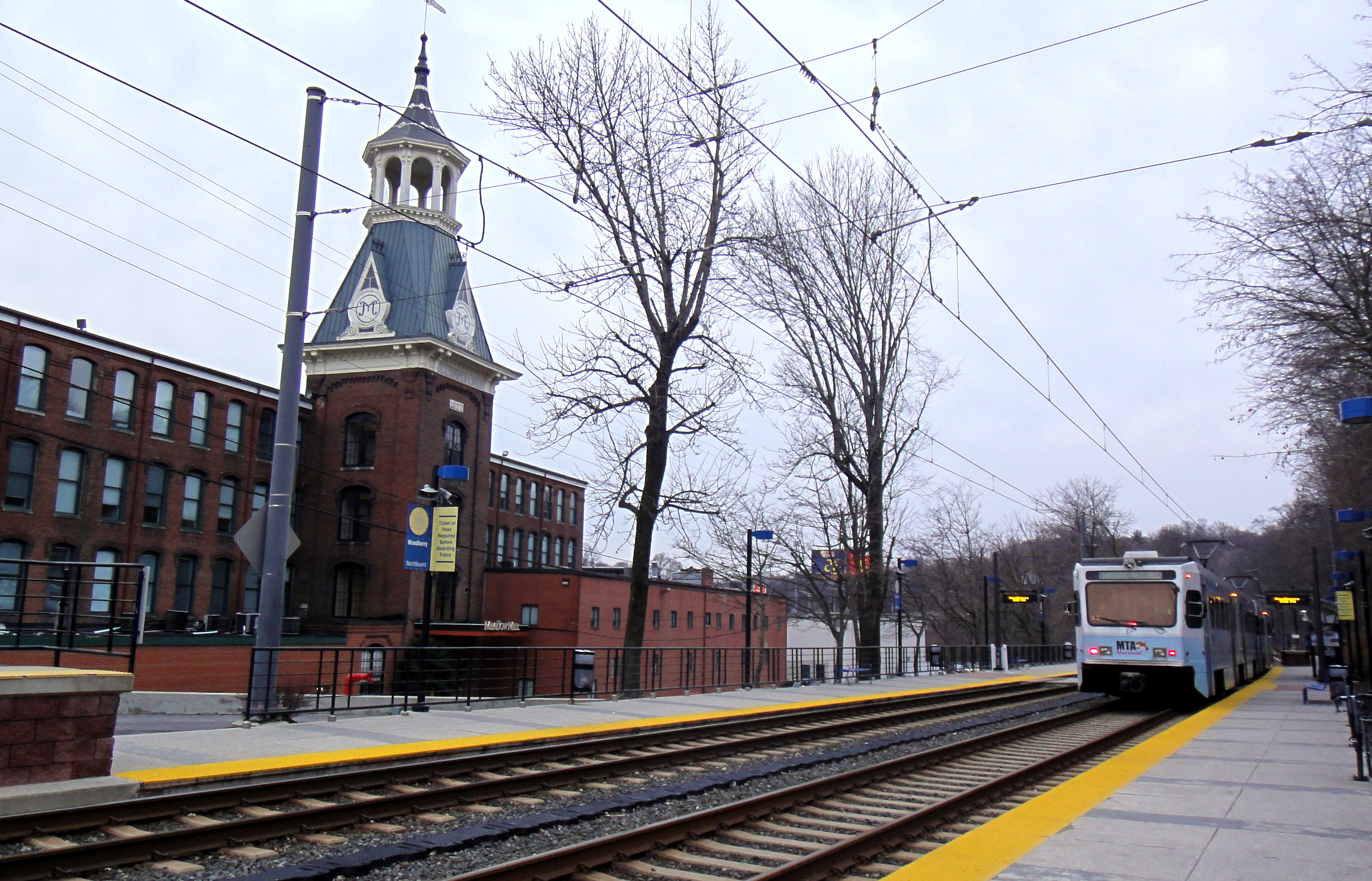
- Woodberry station in February 2013

General information
- Location: 3465 Seneca Street; Baltimore, Maryland
- Coordinates: 39°19′52.3″N 76°38′36.3″W
- Owner: Maryland Transit Administration
- Platforms: 2 side platforms
- Tracks: 2
- Connections: 22, 98; Jones Falls Trail

Construction
- Accessible: Yes

History
- Opened: April 2, 1992

Passengers
- 2017: 384 daily

Services
| Preceding station | Maryland Transit Administration | Following station |
|---|---|---|
| North Avenue toward BWI Airport or Glen Burnie | Light RailLink | Cold Spring Lane toward Hunt Valley |
Location

Woodberry station is a Baltimore Light Rail station in the Woodberry neighborhood of Baltimore, Maryland, United States. The station has two side platforms serving two tracks.

The station is near the former site of the Woodberry station of the Northern Central Railway, an affiliate of the Pennsylvania Railroad.
