= North York, Pennsylvania =

Borough in Pennsylvania, US

- Borough
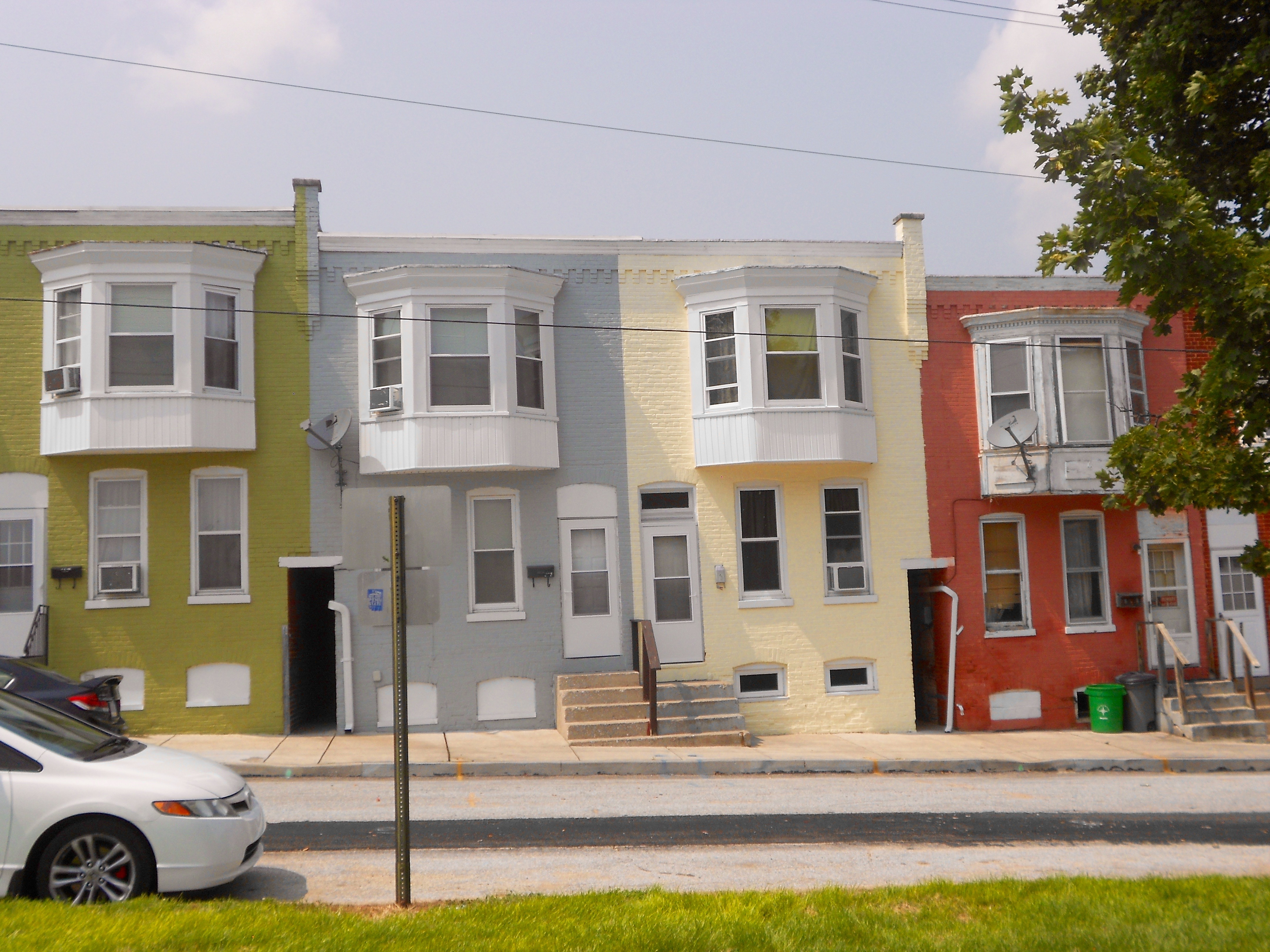
- Houses by the park

- Location in York County and the U.S. state of Pennsylvania

- Location of North York in Pennsylvania North York (the United States)
- Coordinates: 39°58′40″N 76°43′53″W
- Country: United States
- State: Pennsylvania
- County: York
- Settled: 1888
- Incorporated: 1899

Government
  - Type: Borough Council

Area
  - Total: 0.31 sq mi (0.81 km^{2})
  - Land: 0.31 sq mi (0.79 km^{2})
  - Water: 0.0077 sq mi (0.02 km^{2})
- Elevation: 394 ft (120 m)

Population (2020)
  - Total: 2,200
  - Density: 7,215.5/sq mi (2,785.93/km^{2})
- Time zone: UTC-5 (Eastern (EST))
  - Summer (DST): UTC-4 (EDT)
- Area code: 717
- FIPS code: 42-55608
- Website: https://northyorkborough.com/

North York is a borough, adjacent to the city of York, in York County, Pennsylvania, United States. As of the 2020 census, the borough had a total population of 2,196.

== Geography ==
North York is located at 39°58'40" North, 76°43'53" West (39.977814, -76.731481).

According to the U.S. Census Bureau, the borough has a total area of 0.3 square miles (0.78 km^{2}), all land.

== Demographics ==
Historical population
Census	Pop.	Note	%±
1900	1,185		—
1910	1,902		60.5%
1920	2,230		17.2%
1930	2,416		8.3%
1940	2,416		0.0%
1950	2,445		1.2%
1960	2,290		−6.3%
1970	2,032		−11.3%
1980	1,755		−13.6%
1990	1,689		−3.8%
2000	1,689		0.0%
2010	1,914		13.3%
2020	2,200		14.9%
2021 (est.)	2,248	▲	2.2%

As of the census of 2000, there were 1,689 people, 725 households, and 435 families living in the borough.

The population density was 5,669.1 inhabitants per square mile (2,188.9/km^{2}). There were 778 housing units at an average density of 2,611.3 per square mile (1,008.2/km^{2}).

The racial makeup of the borough was 93.66% White, 2.19% African American, 0.53% Asian, 0.06% Pacific Islander, 1.54% from other races, and 2.01% from two or more races. Hispanic or Latino of any race were 3.61% of the population.

There were 725 households, out of which 28.8% had children under the age of 18 living with them; 38.2% were married couples living together, 15.3% had a female householder with no husband present, and 39.9% were non-families. 32.7% of all households were made up of individuals, and 11.2% had someone living alone who was 65 years of age or older.

The average household size was 2.31 and the average family size was 2.91.

In the borough, the population was spread out, with 25.6% under the age of 18, 7.5% from 18 to 24, 33.3% from 25 to 44, 21.1% from 45 to 64, and 12.4% who were 65 years of age or older. The median age was 35 years.

For every 100 females there were 93.2 males. For every 100 females aged 18 and over, there were 87.7 males.

The median income for a household in the borough was $36,875, and the median income for a family was $41,935. Males had a median income of $30,893 compared with that of $23,567 for females.

The per capita income for the borough was $16,938.

Roughly 7.5% of families and 9.3% of the population were below the poverty line, including 12.8% of those under the age of 18 and 7.7% of those aged 65 and older.
