= Interstate 83 =

Interstate Highway in Pennsylvania and Maryland

Interstate 83
- I-83 highlighted in red; I-83 Bus. in blue

Route information
- Maintained by Baltimore DOT, MDSHA, PennDOT
- Length: 85.03 mi (136.84 km)
- Existed: August 14, 1957–present
- NHS: Entire route

Major junctions
- South end: President Street / Fayette Street in Baltimore, MD
- US 1 in Baltimore, MD; I-695 / MD 25A near Timonium, MD; US 30 in York, PA; I-76 Toll / Penna Turnpike near Camp Hill, PA; PA 581 in Lemoyne, PA; I-283 / US 322 near Paxtang, PA; US 22 near Harrisburg, PA
- North end: I-81 / US 322 near Progress, PA

Location
- Country: United States
- States: Maryland, Pennsylvania
- Counties: MD: City of Baltimore, Baltimore; PA: York, Cumberland, Dauphin

Highway system
- Interstate Highway System; Main; Auxiliary; Suffixed; Business; Future
← I-81	MD	→ MD 84
← PA 82	PA	→ PA 83

Interstate 83 (I-83) is an interstate highway located in the states of Maryland and Pennsylvania in the Eastern United States. Its southern terminus is at a signalized intersection with Fayette Street in Baltimore, Maryland; its northern terminus is at I-81 near Harrisburg, Pennsylvania. I-83 runs from Downtown Baltimore north to I-695 near the northern suburb of Timonium on the Jones Falls Expressway before forming a concurrency with I-695. After splitting from I-695, the route follows the Baltimore–Harrisburg Expressway north to the border between Maryland and Pennsylvania. Upon crossing the state line, I-83 becomes the Veterans of Foreign Wars of the United States Memorial Highway and continues north through York toward the Harrisburg area. The route runs along the southern and eastern portion of the Capital Beltway that encircles Harrisburg before reaching its northern terminus.

Most of the route south of Lemoyne, Pennsylvania, is a direct replacement of U.S. Route 111 (US 111), a former spur of US 11.

== Route description ==
Lengths
	mi	km
MD	34.50	55.52
PA	50.53	81.32
Total	85.03	136.84

=== Maryland ===
==== Jones Falls Expressway ====
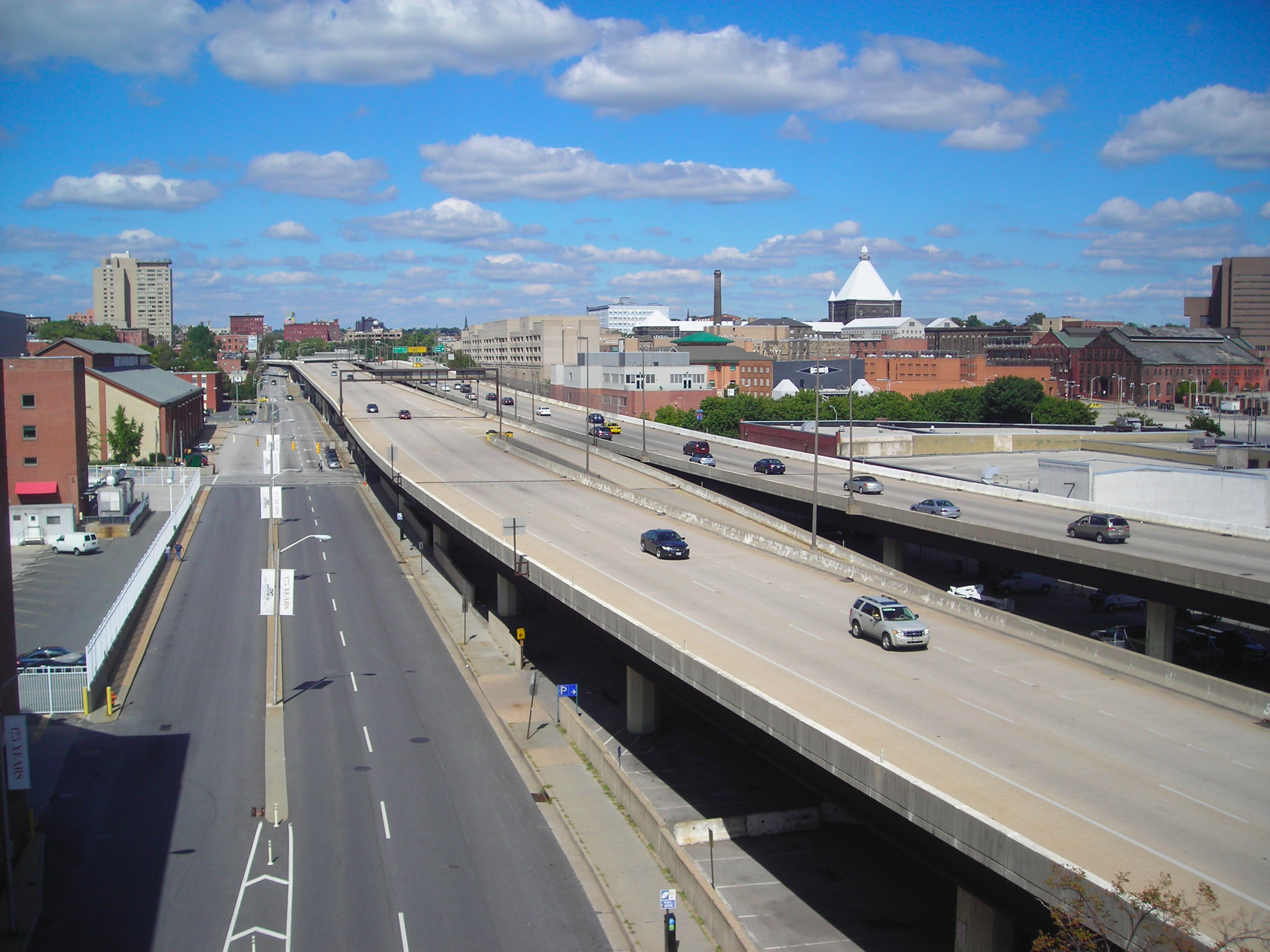
I-83 seen from the US 40 (Orleans Street) bridge in Baltimore, Maryland

The Jones Falls Expressway (JFX) is a 10.2-mile-long (16.4 km) freeway that carries I-83 from downtown Baltimore to the northern suburbs. It is the area's true north–south artery because I-95 runs from southwest to northeast through the southern edge of the city. Its southern terminus is at Fayette Street, and its northern terminus is at Maryland Route 25 (MD 25), just north of the Baltimore Beltway (I-695). Inside Baltimore, the road is maintained not by the Maryland State Highway Administration (MDSHA), which controls most freeways in the state, but by the city's department of transportation.

The freeway begins at an at-grade, four-way intersection between the JFX, Fayette Street, and President Street, located in close proximity to the Phoenix Shot Tower. President Street continues south along the eastern edge of the central business district (CBD) to terminate at a traffic circle in Inner Harbor East. Fayette Street serves as an access route into the downtown area.

Passing beneath the Orleans Street Viaduct (US 40), the JFX runs north, passing near the Washington Monument. Between exits 3 and 4, there is a 90-degree turn that sometimes requires motorists to slow down just before entering it, with an advisory speed posted at 40 mph (64 km/h). The curve is located between the Guilford Avenue and Preston Street overpasses. Within the curve, the southbound JFX interchanges with MD 2, with an exit to St. Paul Street and an entrance from Charles Street (MD 139).

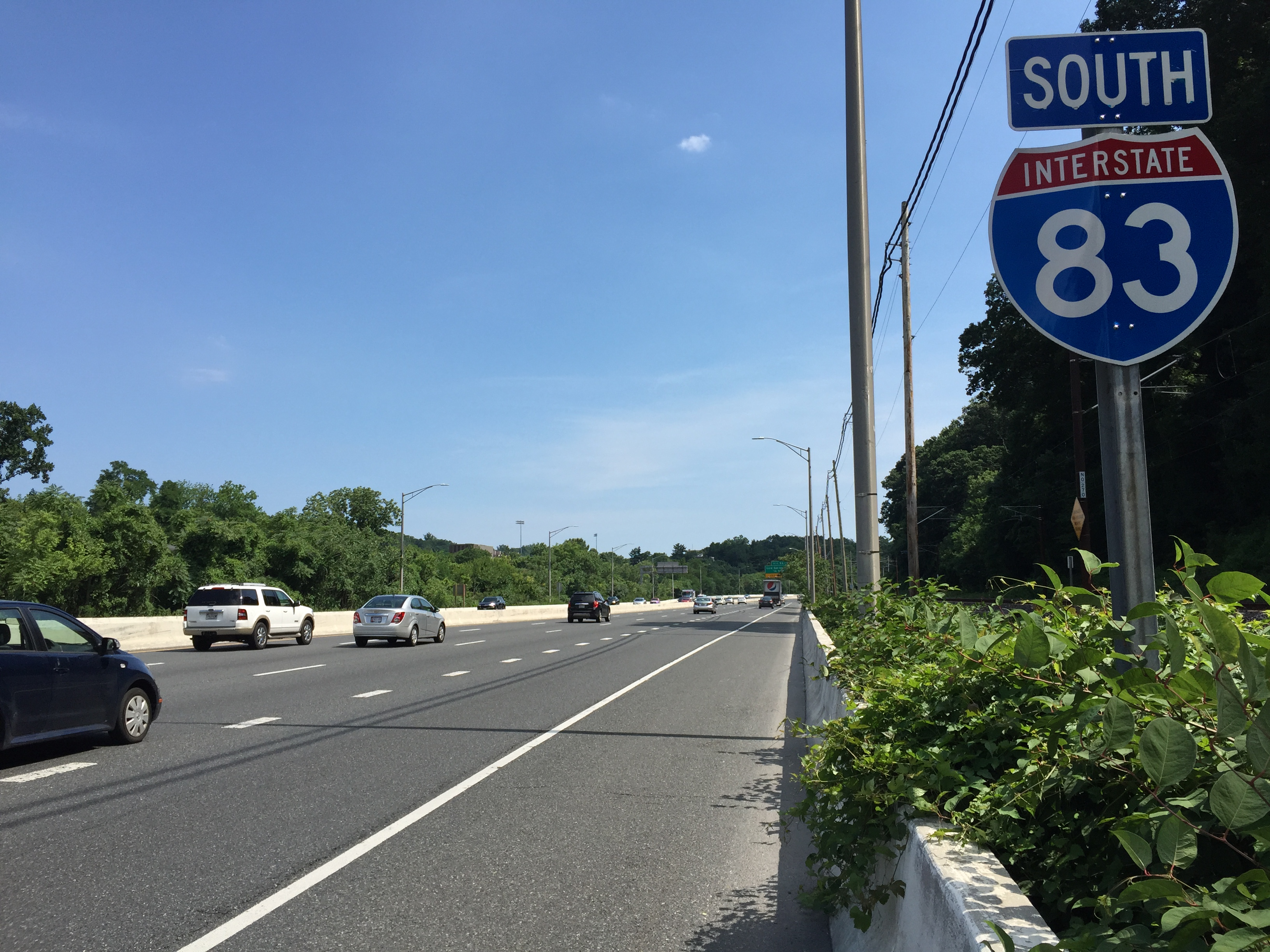
I-83 southbound on the JFX past Northern Parkway in Baltimore, Maryland

Having passed this curve, the JFX begins to parallel MD 25, going under the Howard Street Bridge and interchanging with Maryland Avenue and North Avenue (US 1/US 40 Truck) before continuing north past Druid Lake, forming the northeastern boundary of Druid Hill Park. Running northwest out of the city center, the JFX is paralleled by its namesake river, the Jones Falls, on one side, and the Maryland Transit Administration's Baltimore Light RailLink line on the other. Closer to downtown, the light rail line peels off in a different direction, while the falls flows directly underneath the elevated freeway.

After interchanging with Cold Spring Lane and Northern Parkway (between which lies Cylburn Arboretum), the JFX exits Baltimore, entering Baltimore County. Passing close to Mt. Washington Pediatric Hospital, the Mount Washington campus of the Johns Hopkins University, and Jones Falls Park, the route skirts the edge of Lake Roland before interchanging with Ruxton Road just south of I-695 (Baltimore Beltway).

At the beltway, I-83 leaves the JFX and joins I-695 for a distance of 1.4 miles (2.3 km), where it separates from the latter route to continue onward into northern Maryland. Meanwhile, the JFX continues for another 0.5 miles (0.80 km) in a four-lane divided format before terminating at an at-grade intersection with MD 25 (Falls Road). I-83 and I-695 split off at the southern terminus of the Baltimore–Harrisburg Expressway, and I-695 continues its eastward trek toward Towson and Parkville.

==== Baltimore–Harrisburg Expressway ====
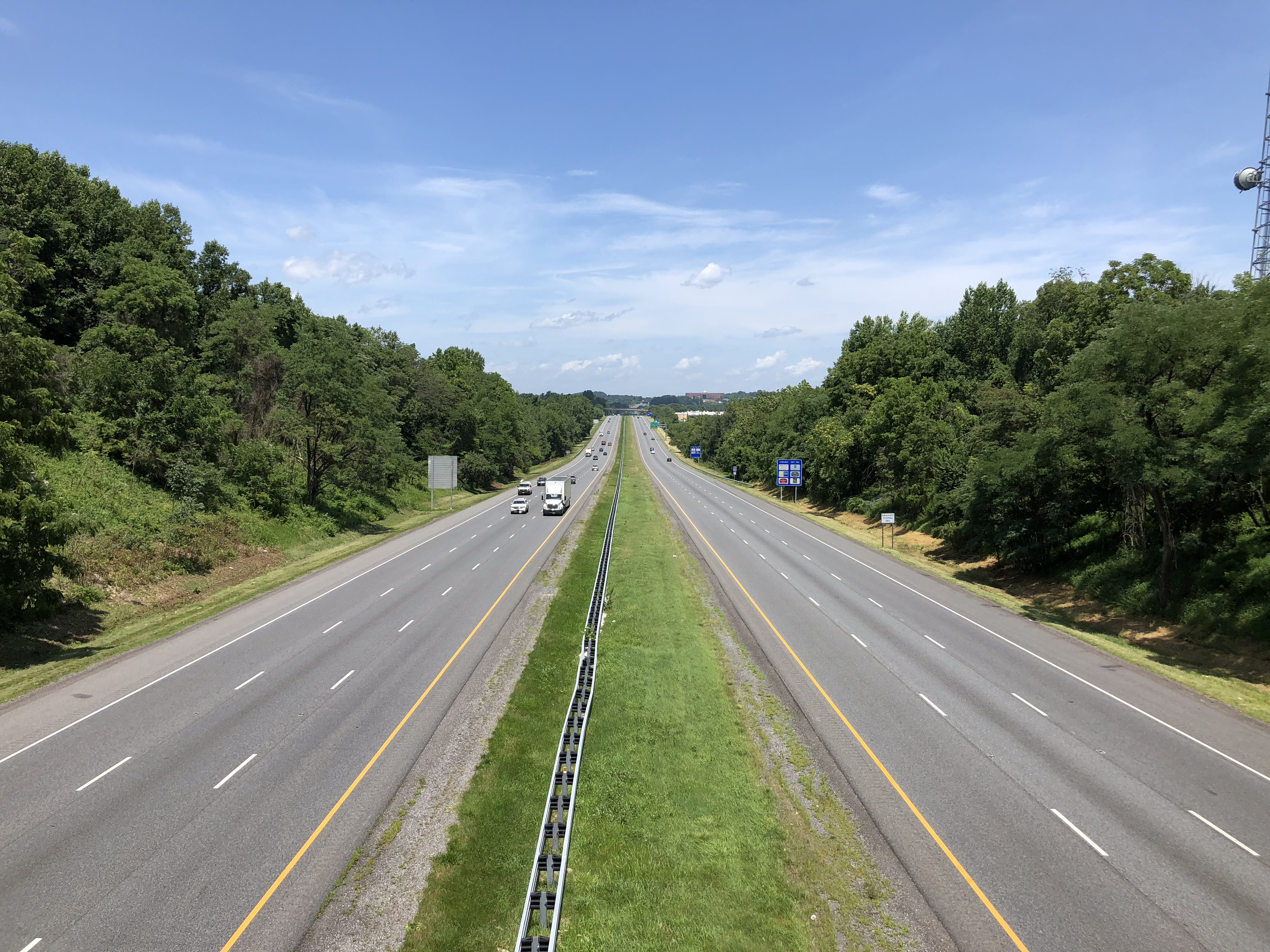
I-83 northbound at Warren Road in Cockeysville, Maryland

After separating from the beltway, I-83 is known as the Baltimore–Harrisburg Expressway. Running due north away from the beltway, the route parallels MD 45 (York Road), the former route of US 111. Passing to the west of Timonium and Cockeysville, I-83 leaves the suburban belt around Baltimore and enters rural Baltimore County just north of Hunt Valley at Shawan Road. I-83 and MD 45 continue to parallel one another through the northern portion of the county, with MD 45 crossing over I-83 once, at an interchange. This segment of I-83 has several sections with higher than usual gradients.

The only major settlement encountered by I-83 along this stretch is Monkton, reached via MD 137. To the west of I-83, MD 137 connects with the northern terminus of MD 25, I-83's former companion to the south.

The Interstate eventually crosses the Mason–Dixon line into York County, Pennsylvania, 25 miles (40 km) north of Baltimore, mere feet from a partial interchange with Freeland Road and parallel with MD 45; the latter route becomes the Susquehanna Trail when it reaches Pennsylvania.

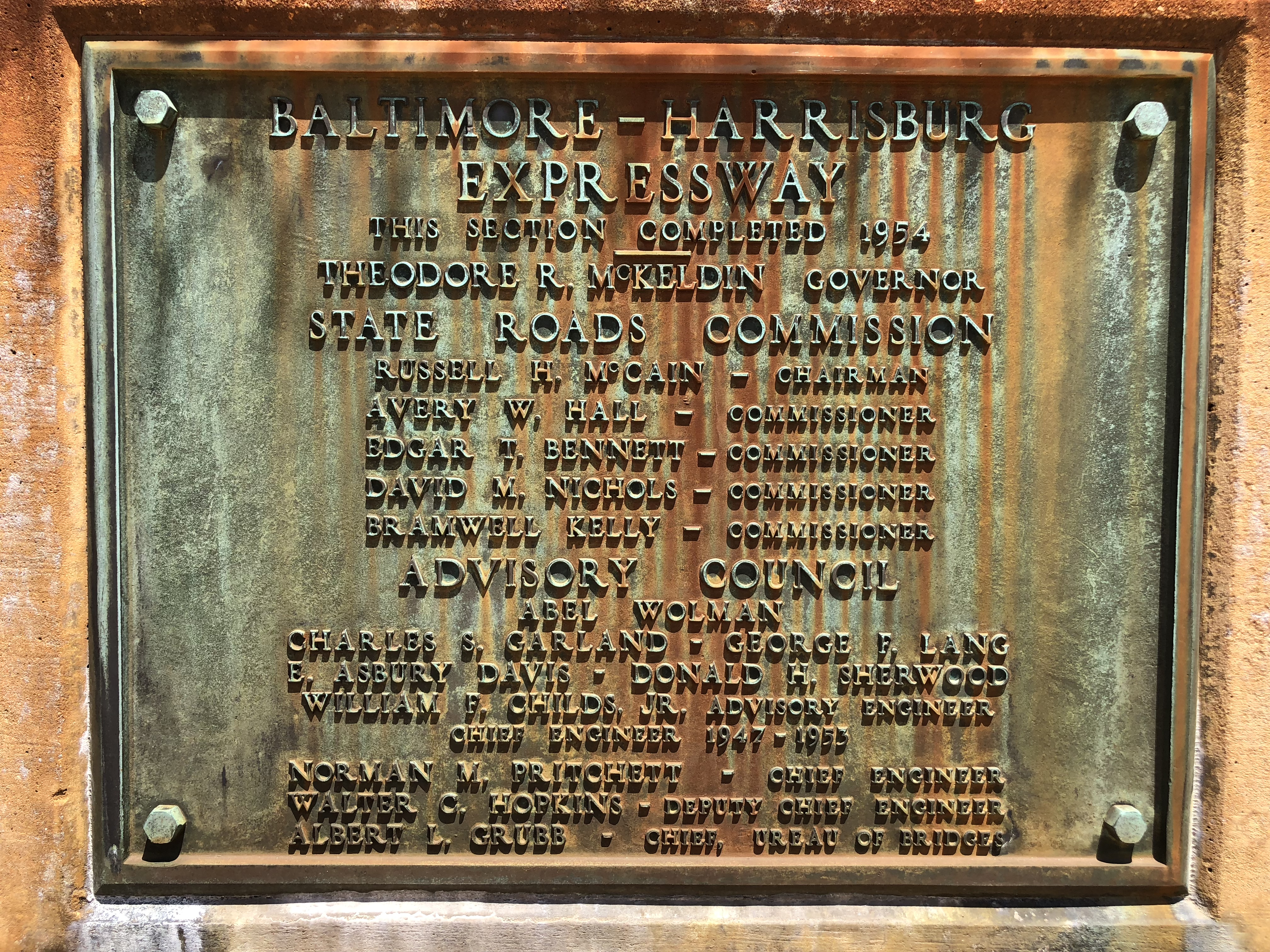
Baltimore–Harrisburg Expressway (I-83) dedication plaque

=== Pennsylvania ===
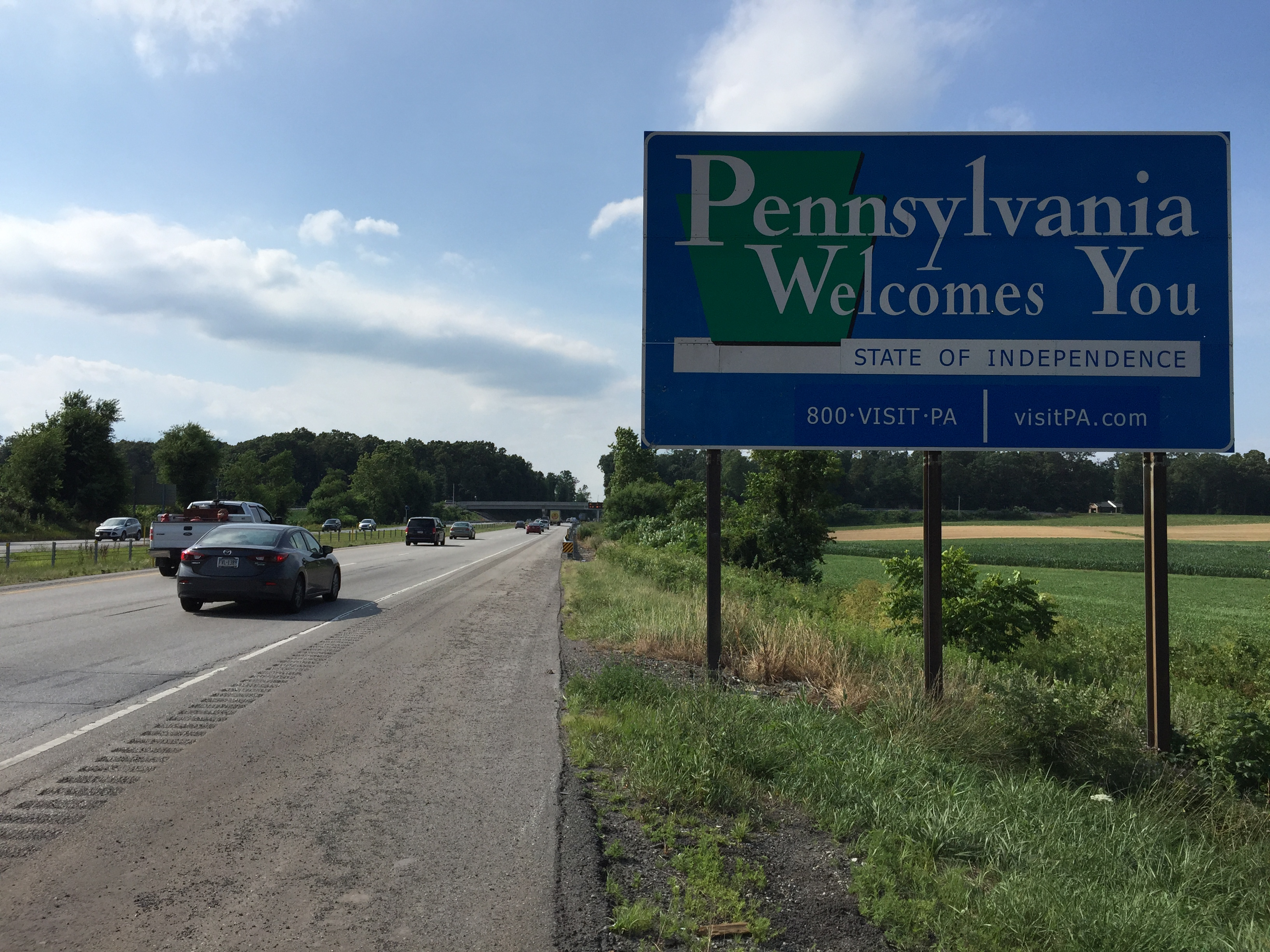
View north along I-83 entering Pennsylvania from Maryland

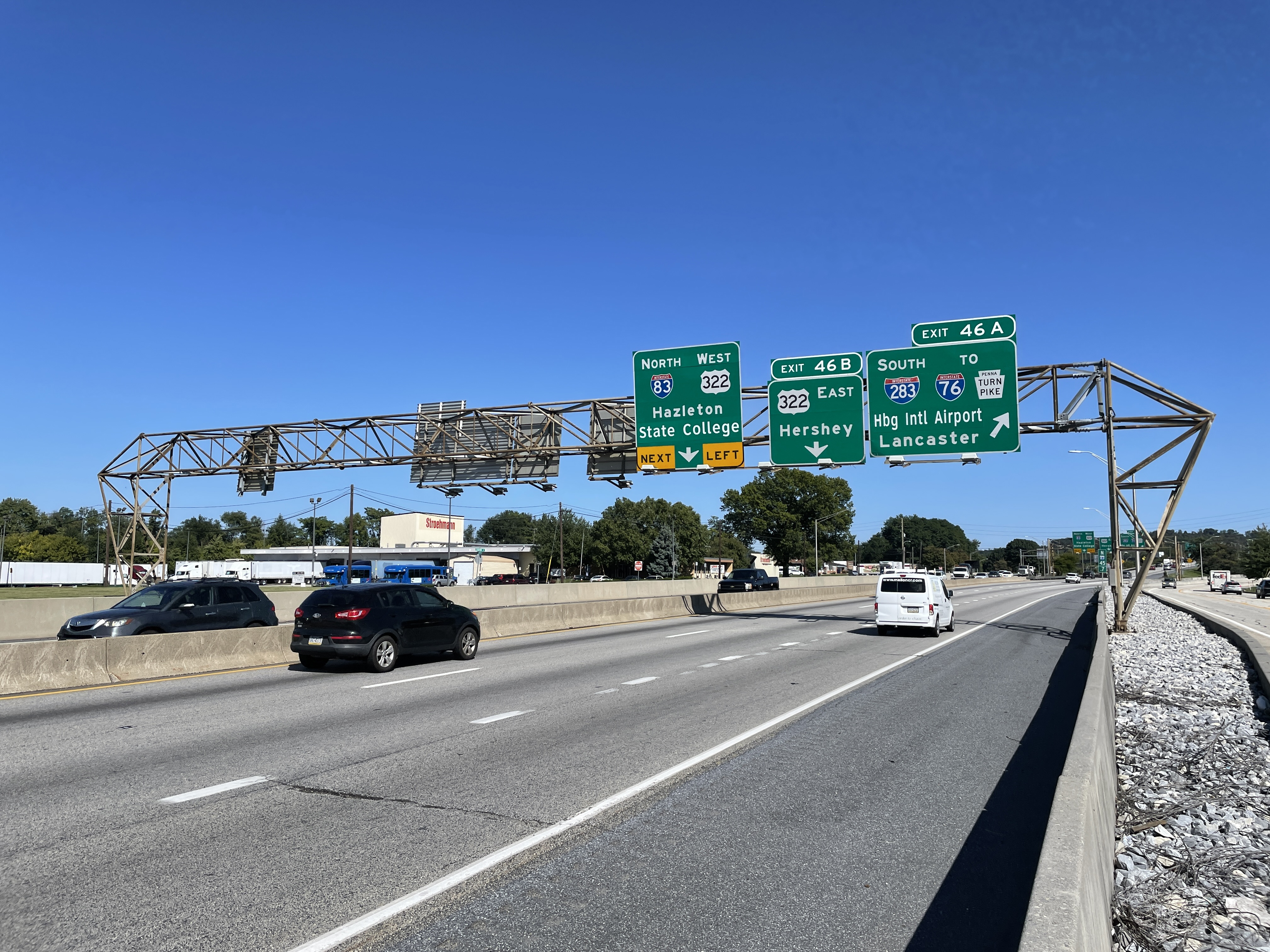
I-83 northbound approaching the interchange with I-283 and US 322 in Swatara Township, Pennsylvania

Throughout Pennsylvania, I-83 is named the Veterans of Foreign Wars of the United States Memorial Highway. I-83 enters Pennsylvania, crossing the Mason–Dixon line and passing to the east of Shrewsbury as it runs due north toward York. The route bypasses the boroughs of Loganville and Jacobus before entering the city of York.

I-83 has a business route through downtown York, known as I-83 Business (I-83 Bus.). The business route follows the former path of US 111, while I-83 turns northeast and then north again to bypass the urban area. Near Pennsylvania Route 462 (PA 462), the Lincoln Highway, the interstate turns west for a short distance, then north again to an interchange with US 30. Beyond US 30, I-83 resumes its straight path, running due north out of York and passing to the west of Emigsville.

North of PA 297, I-83 is known as the Susquehanna Expressway. It maintains this name as it passes to the south and west of Valley Green, continuing north toward Harrisburg. South of Harrisburg, I-83 has an interchange with I-76 (Pennsylvania Turnpike). North of I-76, I-83 continues due north, passing through New Cumberland, before an interchange with the eastern terminus of PA 581 in Lemoyne.

After the interchange with PA 581, I-83 is known as the Capital Beltway. The highway turns due east and crosses the Susquehanna River over the John Harris Bridge, south of Downtown Harrisburg, passing south of Paxtang before encountering I-283 and US 322 at the Eisenhower Interchange. Within the interchange, I-83 exits from itself, with each direction of traffic following a one-lane ramp; facing east, I-83's former lanes become US 322, while, facing north, I-283's lanes become I-83. The interchanges includes ramps to local roads as well. From this point northbound to exit 51, traffic is often congested during daylight hours. I-83 and westbound US 322 continue north toward US 22 and I-81, I-283 goes due south toward the turnpike and PA 283's western terminus, and eastbound US 322 goes due east toward Hershey.

Beyond this interchange, I-83 and US 322 run due north through the eastern suburbs of Harrisburg, interchanging with US 22 northeast of the CBD in Colonial Park, before I-83 terminates at a three-way semidirectional interchange with I-81. From here, US 322 continues west along I-81 south.

== History ==
=== Pennsylvania ===
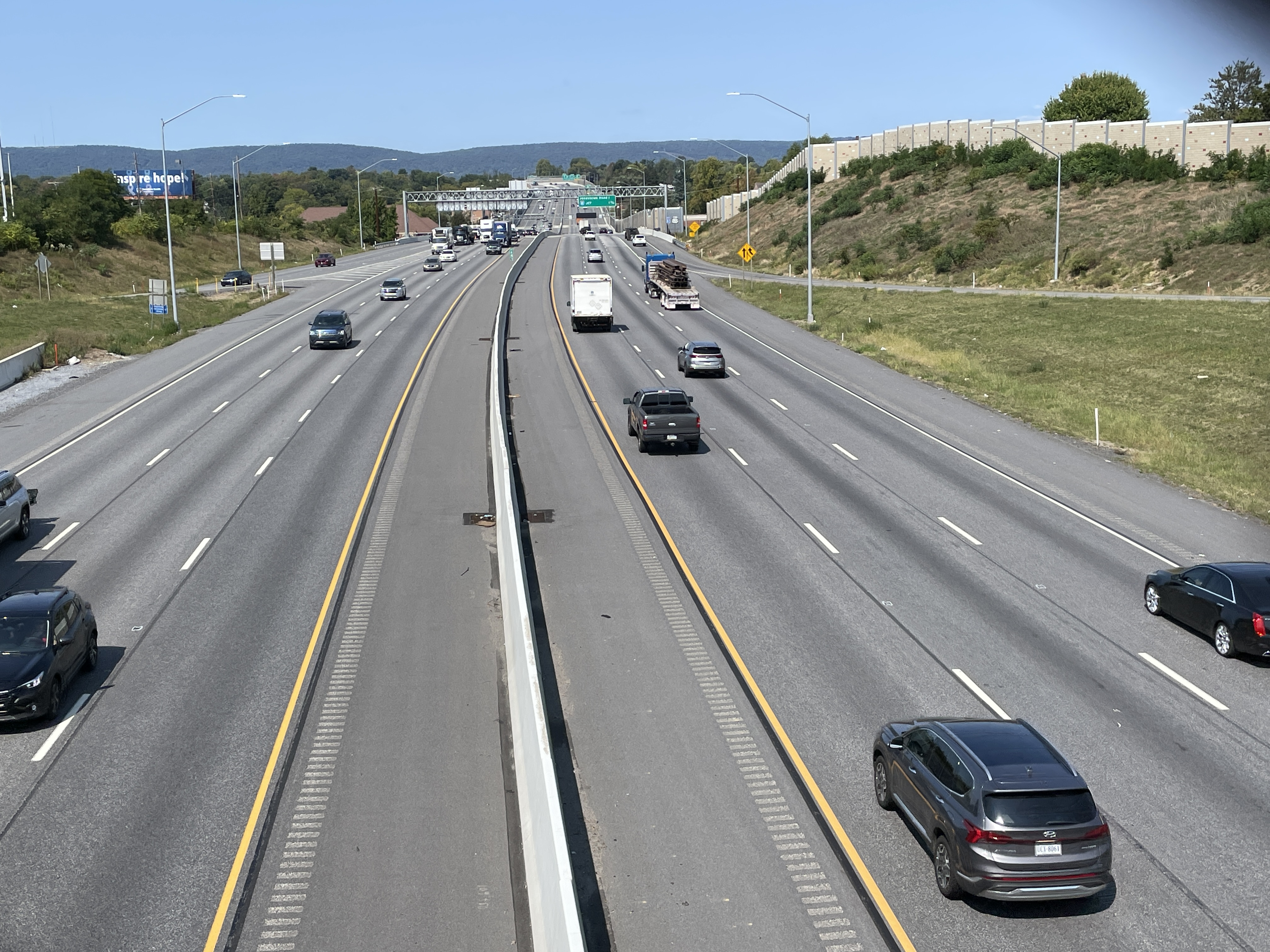
I-83 northbound/US 322 westbound at Union Deposit Road in Progress, Pennsylvania

I-83 was one of the first Interstate Highways built in Pennsylvania. Much of its routing through the state follows a freeway bypass of the since decommissioned US 111. The route received the I-83 designation in 1960. The first section built (opened 1954) runs from PA 392 in Newberry Township north to PA 114 in Fairview Township. The entire highway was completed in 1971 with the massive Eisenhower Interchange in Harrisburg.

From 2012 to 2015, the I-83/PA 581 interchange outside of Harrisburg, Pennsylvania, was modified. Formerly, I-83 was reduced to one lane going northbound through the interchange, resulting in frequent traffic jams during peak travel times. The northbound part of the highway was widened, one bridge was replaced, and several exits in the vicinity were reconfigured. A second project started in 2016, with work to be completed from its northern terminus at I-81 to just past the Union Deposit Road interchange. The project, completed in 2022, reconstructed two interchanges and associated overpasses, as well as widened adjacent sections of the highway to six throughlanes.

The interchange with PA 851 near Shrewsbury was reconstructed into a diverging diamond interchange, which opened to traffic on June 28, 2021.

I-83 northbound at PA 124 in East York, Pennsylvania

In York, Pennsylvania, a reconstruction of the Mt. Rose Avenue (PA 124) interchange took place from 2015 to 2022 in anticipation of a future widening of I-83 around the east and north sides of the city. Also, studies are being done north of town to help ease traffic in a section heavily traveled by trucks.

On October 23, 2023, work began on a project in Dauphin County to reconstruct and widen a segment of I-83 and reconfigure interchanges. This project extends from the east end of the John Harris Bridge to the Eisenhower Interchange with I-283 and US 322. As part of this project, a new interchange is being built with PA 230 (Cameron Street) to replace the 13th Street interchange. The project has been split into two contracts, construction of which is expected to be finished in 2028. The final completion date has since been delayed to 2033.

As part of its larger plans to reconstruct the highway in the Harrisburg area, PennDot intends to replace the John Harris Bridge and reconstruct adjacent interchanges and highway segments. The project will span from just north of the PA 581 interchange at the south end, to the ongoing (as of 2026) East Shore section 3 project at the north end, and in November 2026 a bid for approximately $1.3 billion was submitted. According to PennDot, it is the largest construction contract in the agency's history. Construction is expected to start in January 2027, with completion expected in 2039.

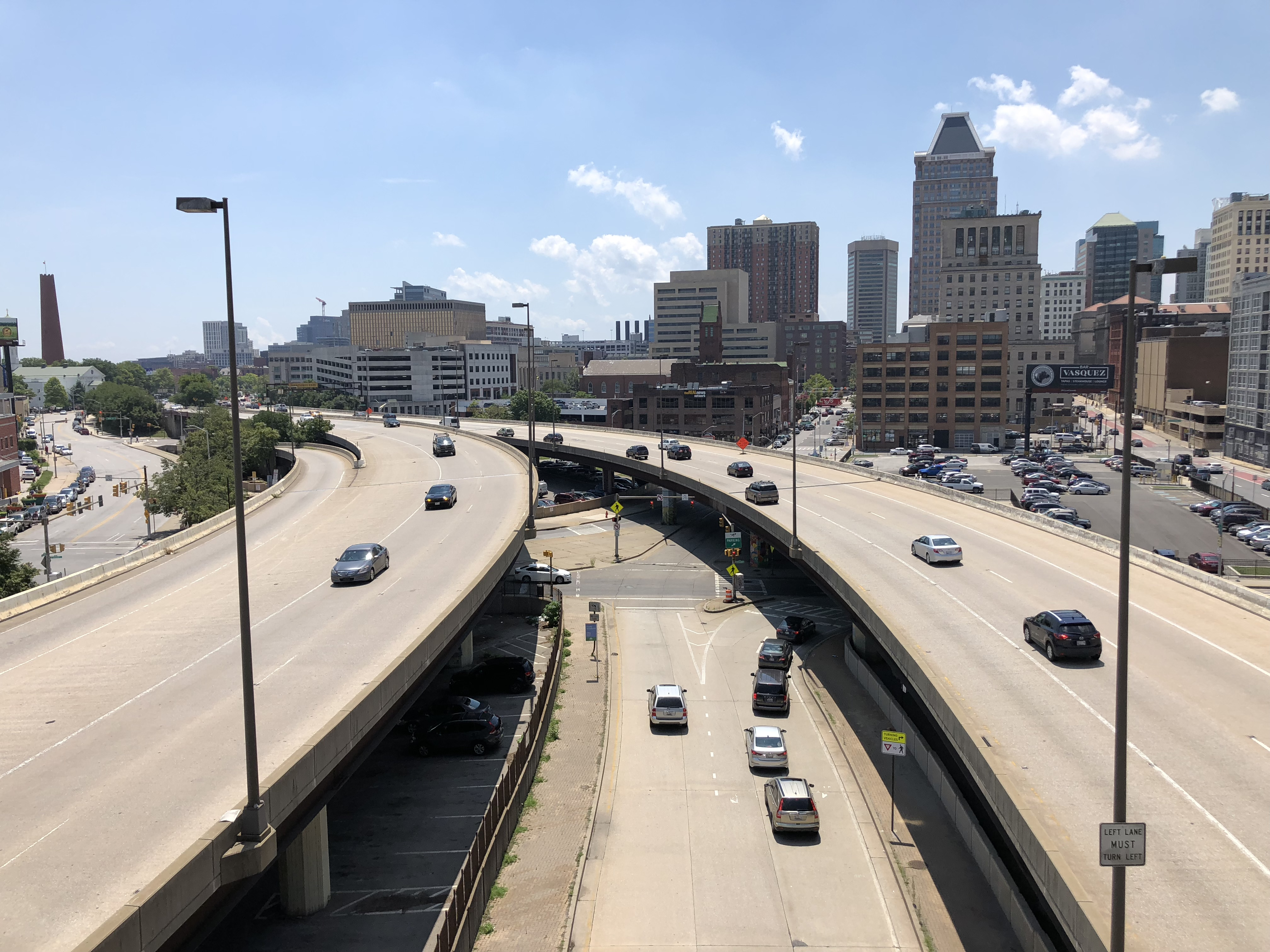
I-83 (JFX) southbound in Baltimore, Maryland

=== Jones Falls Expressway ===
The first Interstate to be built in Baltimore was the JFX; the Greater Baltimore Committee pushed to enact legislation from the Baltimore City Council in 1955. It was the first to be constructed due to community opposition to the other planned freeways within the city. The JFX follows the path of the Jones Falls River, a natural corridor that divided the city into eastern and western segments. By the early 1960s, the JFX was completed as far as Guilford Avenue, within the city limits. It was completed as far as Pleasant Street in the downtown area by 1983, but the remaining 4.4 miles (7.1 km) to I-95 were canceled in September 1982. To compensate for the loss of the remainder of the JFX, the portion in situ was extended to Fayette Street by 1987, and the Jones Falls Boulevard project substantially rebuilt 0.75 miles (1.21 km) of President Street, across from the JFX at Fayette Street, to allow the traffic to and from the Interstate to be collected and distributed from the surrounding city streets. By 1990, the project was completed.

Due to community opposition to the other freeway plans being produced by city officials, the JFX was the very first limited-access highway to be completed within the city of Baltimore and remained so for several years. Originally, the JFX was to continue through the Southeast Baltimore neighborhoods of Fell's Point and Canton to a junction with the then-planned I-95, but opposition from residents of those neighborhoods successfully blocked that proposal. As a result, I-83 became the first Maryland road in the Interstate Highway System.

==== Planning ====
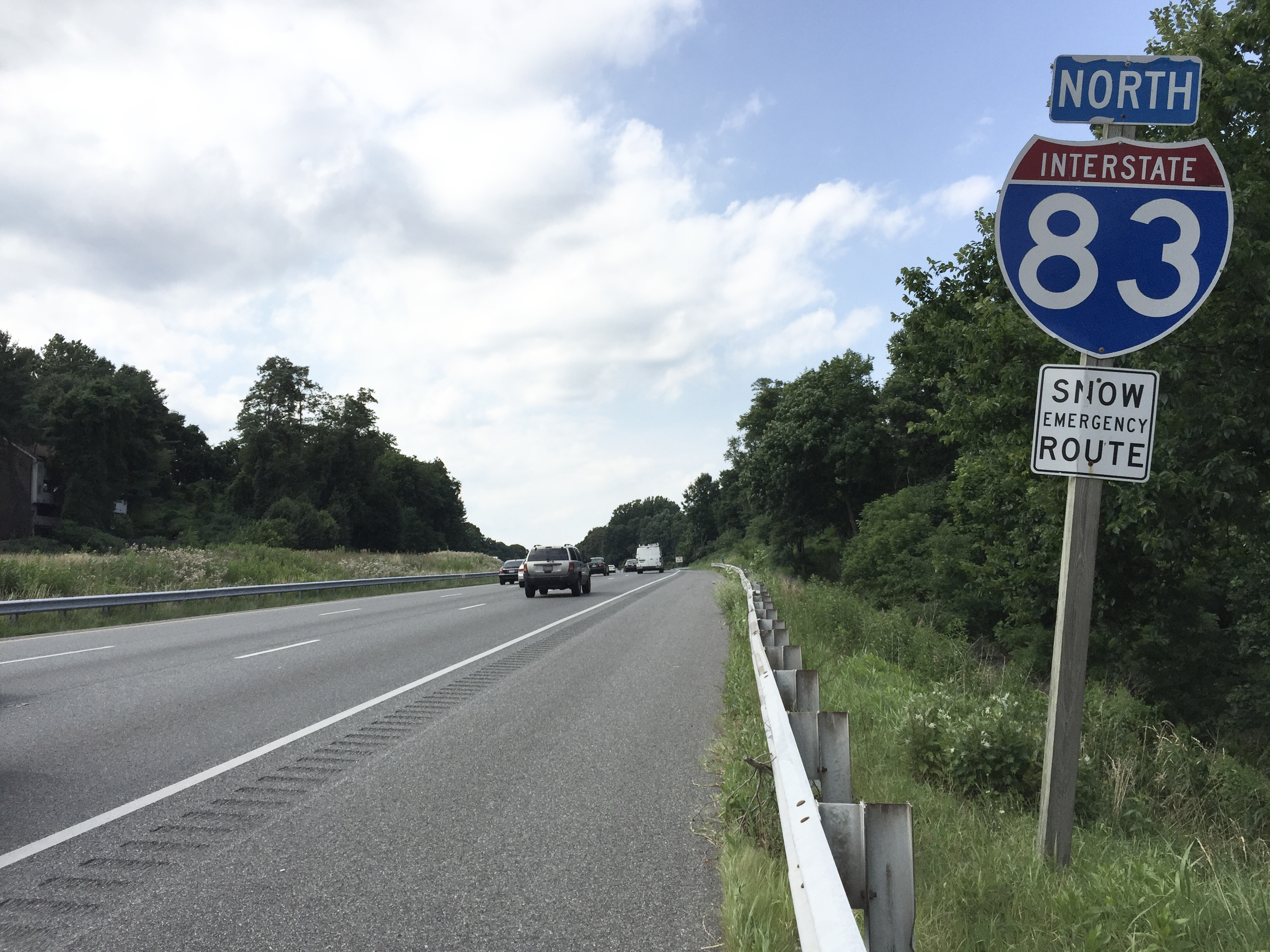
I-83 northbound on the JFX in Towson, Maryland

As part of the planning for an east–west route through Baltimore, the alignment of the JFX underwent various modifications. Under the original plan for freeways in Baltimore, the 1962 Baltimore 10-D interstate System, the JFX would have junctioned I-70N (which became I-70 in 1975) and I-95, which were planned to follow an east–west route through the southern edge of the CBD, near the southeastern edge of the CBD. The JFX would end at roughly the same location where it currently does. As a result of community opposition to other portions of the 10-D System, the 1969 Baltimore 3-A interstate and Boulevard System was adopted by the city. In this plan, the JFX would continue south along its present alignment then turn east and pass through the Fell's Point neighborhood on a six-lane elevated viaduct, before continuing east along Boston Street to junction I-95 (which was also rerouted to its current alignment) north of the Fort McHenry Tunnel. In the mid-1970s, this plan was modified due to fears that the viaduct would result in destruction of the Fell's Point area, which contains many historic properties. Under the modification, I-83 would continue south and descend into a six-lane underwater tunnel beneath the Inner Harbor, then turn east under the harbor, pass to the south of Fell's Point, return to the surface in the Canton area and continue to I-95.

Under this plan, I-83 was expected to act mostly as a northerly spur to and from the CBD and as an easterly spur to and from the CBD; through traffic was expected to be a small proportion of the total amount making use of the route. I-83's terminus at I-95 would have been a full three-way freeway-to-freeway interchange, with a full complement of ramps provided for access to and from Boston and O'Donnell streets. When construction began on I-95 through East Baltimore in the mid-1970s, a short six-lane section was built within the vicinity of the planned I-83 interchange. This was done in anticipation of I-83 connecting the CBD to I-95, the rest of which carries at least eight lanes of traffic throughout the city.

==== Truncation ====
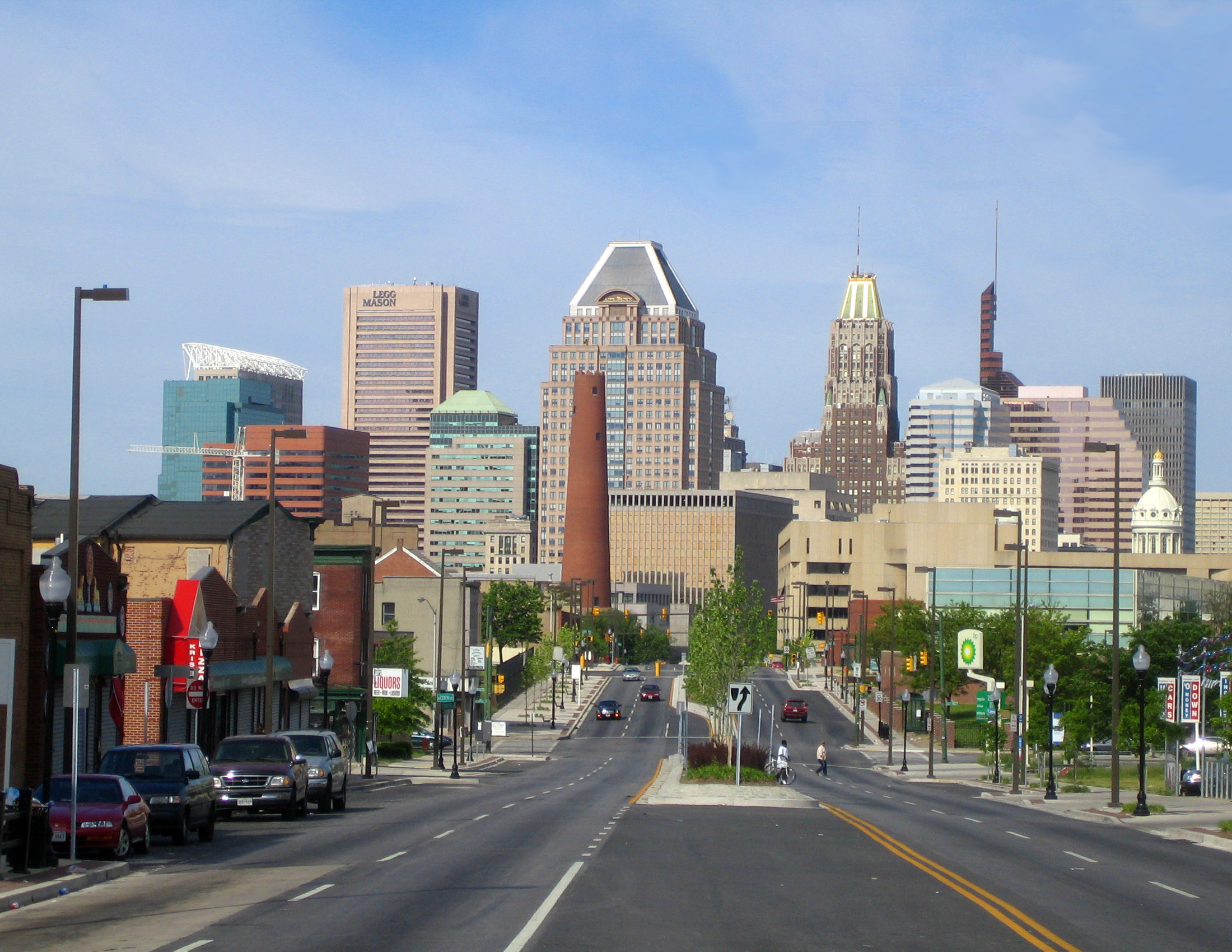
Long-distance view of intersection of Fayette Street, President Street, and I-83 in Baltimore, Maryland

By 1963, the JFX was completed as far south as Guilford Avenue and, by the mid-1970s, was extended to Monument Street. By 1983, the route extended all the way to Pleasant Street, with a dead-end bridge stub indicating plans to continue south along the 3-A alignment to I-95.

In September 1982, however, the segment of the JFX between Pleasant Street and I-95, a distance of 4.4 miles (7.1 km), was officially withdrawn from the Interstate Highway System. Robert Douglas, then the chief of the Interstate Division for Baltimore City (IDBC), stated at the time that the very high financial costs of the I-83 extension (estimated at $609 million in the early 1980s [equivalent to $2.18 billion in 2025], and likely to reach $1 billion [equivalent to $3.57 billion in 2025] with inflation taken into account) led to the cancelation of the segment. As a result, the JFX was truncated at Fayette Street, ending at an at-grade intersection.

To make up for the loss of the I-83 segment, the Jones Falls Boulevard project substantially rebuilt approximately 0.5 miles (0.80 km) of President Street between I-83 and the downtown area to provide the capacity to absorb traffic to and from the Interstate; the project was completed by 1987. Other roadways in the canceled I-83 corridor also benefited from major reconstruction and rehabilitation. The federal funding planned to be used for the I-83 extension was instead cross-transferred to other highway projects; routes that may have benefited include I-97, I-195, I-370, and the upgrade of a portion of the John Hanson Highway to I-595.

== Future ==
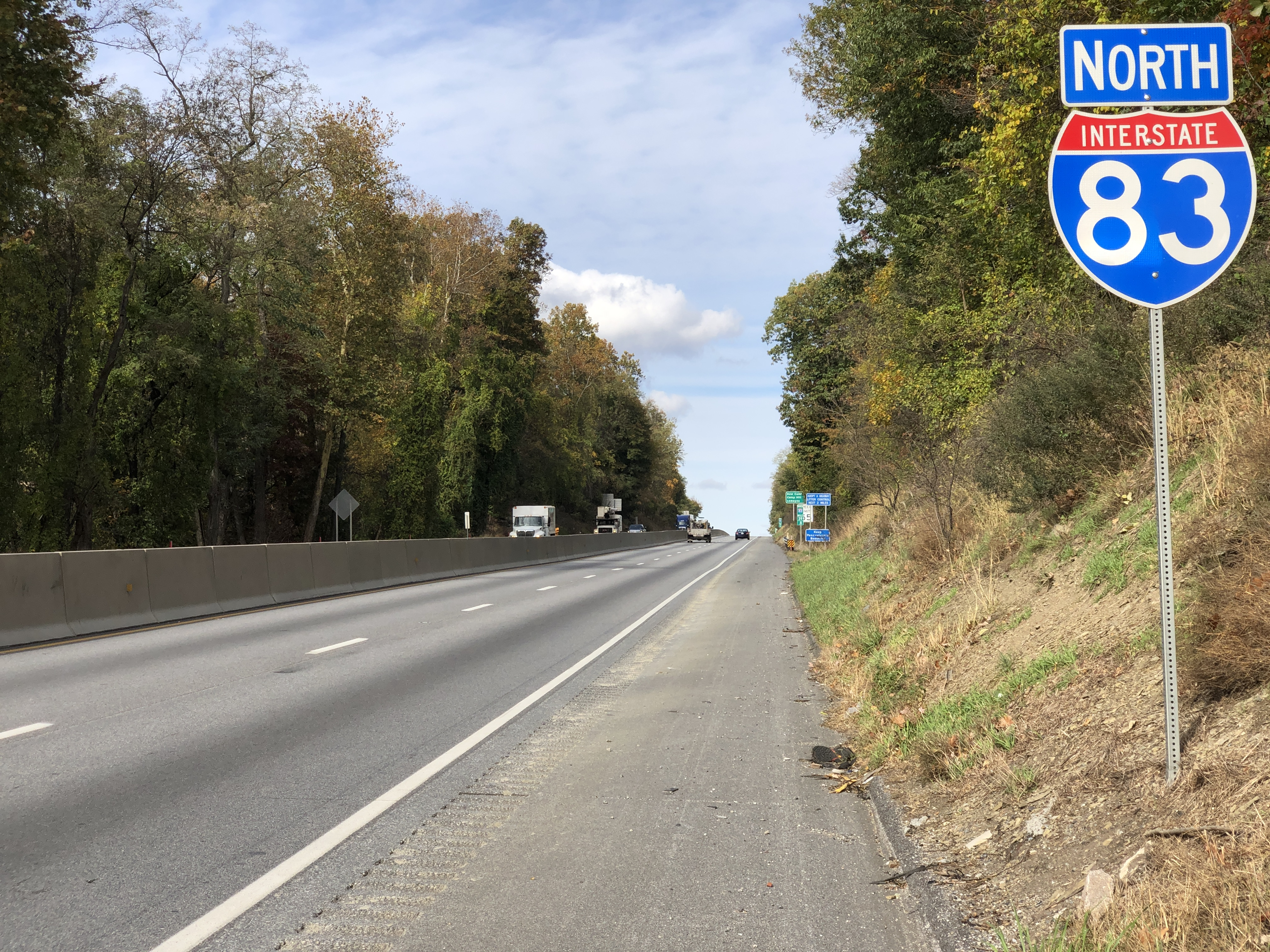
I-83 northbound in Lower Allen Township, Pennsylvania

As Congress worked toward reauthorization of the Surface Transportation and Uniform Relocation Assistance Act, the Greater Lynchburg Chamber of Commerce and other groups in Virginia wanted I-83 extended southward to provide bypasses for Charlottesville, Lynchburg, and Danville, and to link those cities to Greensboro, North Carolina. By June 1991, Robert LaLone, director of programs for the Lynchburg Chamber, admitted that an Interstate was unlikely, but upgrading US 29, with bypasses included, is more likely.

The possibility of extending I-83 (rather than I-99) north to Rochester, New York, was discussed at the October 2002 I-99 Task Force meeting. Part of the proposed route on US 11/US 15, however, has since been rebuilt as a four-lane surface road that does not meet Interstate Highway standards. Expensive additional reconstruction, including new interchanges, service roads, and realignments, would be necessary. The farthest north that I-83 could be extended currently would be Benvenue, Pennsylvania, on a bridge over the Susquehanna River, where a recently built freeway section of US 22/US 322 (Dauphin Bypass) downgrades to a divided four-lane surface road. Recently, however, the Central Susquehanna Valley Thruway, a 10-mile (16 km) freeway project along the proposed corridor near Shamokin Dam, Pennsylvania, has been approved and is under construction as of 2016, with the first section opening in 2022.

In 2005, Walter Sondheim, a prominent Baltimore city planner unveiled a proposal to tear down the elevated portion of the JFX that leads into downtown. In the JFX's place, President Street would be extended north to Eager Street, where the elevated section ends. City officials have since offered tentative support for the idea, though it is unlikely that any action will be taken until about 2020, when the current elevated structure will need an overhaul if it is to remain in use. If the downtown JFX were demolished, Baltimore would join San Francisco, Boston, and Milwaukee to become among the large U.S. cities that have removed some of their downtown elevated freeways. On May 17, 2009, The Baltimore Sun revealed a plan by Rummel, Klepper & Kahl LLP, to tear down a mile (1.6 km) of the JFX to create an urban boulevard that would help connect downtown to the east side of the city and the Johns Hopkins Hospital.

== Exit list ==
Exit numbers in Pennsylvania were changed in April 2001 from sequence-based to distance-based.

State	County	Location	mi	km	Old exit	New exit	Destinations	Notes
Maryland	Baltimore City		0.00	0.00			President Street / Fayette Street east	Southern terminus; at-grade intersection; access to Johns Hopkins Medical Campus and Shot Tower–Market Place station
Maryland	Baltimore City		0.00	0.00		1	Fayette Street west	Southbound exit only
Maryland	Baltimore City						Gay Street	Northbound entrance only
Maryland	Baltimore City		0.30	0.48		—	Pleasant Street	Southbound exit only
Maryland	Baltimore City		0.90	1.45		3	Chase Street	Northbound exit only
Maryland	Baltimore City		0.90	1.45		3	Guilford Avenue	Southbound exit and northbound entrance
Maryland	Baltimore City		1.29	2.08		4	MD 2 south (Saint Paul Street)	Southbound exit and northbound entrance; access to Penn Station
Maryland	Baltimore City		1.51	2.43		5	Maryland Avenue	Southbound exit only
Maryland	Baltimore City		1.85	2.98		6	US 1 / US 40 Truck (North Avenue) / Mount Royal Avenue	Access to North Avenue Light Rail station and MICA
Maryland	Baltimore City		2.42	3.89		7	28th Street / Druid Park Lake Drive	Signed as exits 7A (Druid Park Lake) and 7B (28th Street) northbound
Maryland	Baltimore City		3.02	4.86		8	MD 25 north (Falls Road)	Northbound exit and southbound entrance
Maryland	Baltimore City		4.74	7.63		9	Cold Spring Lane	Signed as exits 9A (east) and 9B (west) northbound; access to Cold Spring Lane Light Rail station and Loyola University Maryland
Maryland	Baltimore City		5.86	9.43		10	Northern Parkway	Signed as exits 10A (east) and 10B (west) northbound; access to Pimlico Race Course and Sinai Hospital
Maryland	Baltimore	Ruxton	8.97	14.44		12	Ruxton Road to MD 133 (Old Court Road)	Northbound exit and southbound entrance
Maryland	Baltimore	Brooklandville	9.74	15.68		23	I-695 west to MD 25 (Falls Road) – Pikesville, Washington	Signed as exits 23B (MD 25) and 23A (I-695) southbound; south end of I-695 overlap; exit number not signed northbound
Maryland	Baltimore	Lutherville	11.26	18.12		24	I-695 east – Towson, New York	North end of I-695 overlap; New York not signed southbound; exit number not signed southbound
Maryland	Baltimore	Timonium	12.59	20.26		16	Timonium Road	Signed as exits 16A (east) and 16B (west) northbound; access to Fairgrounds station
Maryland	Baltimore	Timonium	14.02	22.56		17	Padonia Road	
Maryland	Baltimore	Cockeysville	15.44	24.85		18	Warren Road (MD 943 east) – Cockeysville	Northbound exit and southbound entrance; access to Warren Road Light Rail station
Maryland	Baltimore	Cockeysville	17.18	27.65		20	Shawan Road – Cockeysville	Signed as exits 20A (east) and 20B (west); access to Oregon Ridge Park and Hunt Valley station
Maryland	Baltimore	Sparks	20.97	33.75		24	Belfast Road – Butler, Sparks	
Maryland	Baltimore	Hereford	24.26	39.04		27	MD 137 (Mount Carmel Road) – Hereford	
Maryland	Baltimore	Parkton	27.61	44.43		31	Middletown Road – Parkton	
Maryland	Baltimore	Parkton	29.63	47.68		33	MD 45 – Parkton	
Maryland	Baltimore	Maryland Line	33.22	53.46		36	MD 439 – Maryland Line, Bel Air	
Maryland	Baltimore	Maryland Line	34.35	55.28		37	Freeland Road	Southbound exit and northbound entrance
Mason–Dixon line			34.50 0.000	55.52 0.000	Maryland–Pennsylvania state line			
Pennsylvania	York	Shrewsbury Township	3.529	5.679	1	4	PA 851 – Shrewsbury	Diverging diamond interchange
Pennsylvania	York	Springfield Township	7.529	12.117	2	8	PA 216 – Glen Rock	
Pennsylvania	York	Springfield Township	10.340	16.641	3	10	To PA 214 – Loganville	Access via North Street
Pennsylvania	York	Spring Garden Township	13.657	21.979	4	14	PA 182 – Leader Heights	
Pennsylvania	York	Spring Garden Township	14.230	22.901	5	15	I-83 BL north (South George Street)	Directional T interchange; access to York College of Pennsylvania
Pennsylvania	York	Spring Garden Township	15.497	24.940	6	16	PA 74 (Queen Street)	Signed as exits 16A (south) and 16B (north); access to Penn State York
Pennsylvania	York	Spring Garden Township	17.600	28.324	7	18	PA 124 (Mount Rose Avenue)	Signed as exits 18A (east) and 18B (west) southbound
Pennsylvania	York	Springettsbury Township	18.746	30.169	8	19	PA 462 (Market Street)	Signed as exits 19A (east) and 19B (west) southbound
Pennsylvania	York	Manchester Township	21.071	33.910	9	21	US 30 (Arsenal Road) – Lancaster, Gettysburg	Signed as exits 21A (east) and 21B (west) northbound; no southbound access to US 30 west
Pennsylvania	York	Manchester Township	21.648	34.839	10	22	I-83 BL south / PA 181 (North George Street) to US 30 west	I-83 BL/US 30 not signed northbound
Pennsylvania	York	Manchester Township	23.716	38.167	11	24	PA 238 – Emigsville	
Pennsylvania	York	Manchester Township	28.152	45.306	12	28	PA 297 – Zions View, Strinestown	
Pennsylvania	York	Newberry Township	31.932	51.390	13	32	PA 382 – Newberrytown	Access to Gifford Pinchot State Park and Roundtop Mountain Resort
Pennsylvania	York	Newberry Township	33.374	53.710	14	33	PA 392 – Yocumtown	
Pennsylvania	York	Fairview Township	33.874	54.515	14A	34	Valley Green	Northbound exit and entrance
Pennsylvania	York	Fairview Township	34.991	56.313	15	35	PA 177 – Lewisberry	Access to Gifford Pinchot State Park and Roundtop Mountain Resort
Pennsylvania	York	Fairview Township	35.904	57.782	16	36	PA 262 – Fishing Creek	
Pennsylvania	York	Fairview Township	37.893	60.983	17	38	Reesers Summit	Access via Evergreen Road/Pleasant View Road
Pennsylvania	York	Fairview Township	38.775	62.402	18	39A	PA 114 (Lewisberry Road)	
Pennsylvania	York	Fairview Township	39.055	62.853		39B	I-76 Toll / Penna Turnpike – Philadelphia, Pittsburgh	I-76 / Turnpike exit 242
Pennsylvania	York	Fairview Township	39.246	63.160	18A	40A	Limekiln Road	
Pennsylvania	Cumberland	Lower Allen Township	40.499	65.177	19	40B	New Cumberland	Access via Carlisle Road
Pennsylvania	Cumberland	Lemoyne	41.193	66.294	21-20	41	PA 581 west to I-81 south – Camp Hill, Gettysburg, Lemoyne	Signed as exits 41B (Lemoyne) and 41A (PA 581) northbound; no southbound access to Lemoyne; I-81 not signed southbound
Pennsylvania	Cumberland	Lemoyne	41.438	66.688	22	41B	Lemoyne	Southbound exit and northbound entrance; access via Lowther Street
Pennsylvania	Dauphin	Harrisburg	42.006– 42.636	67.602– 68.616	John Harris Bridge over the Susquehanna River			
Pennsylvania	Dauphin	Harrisburg	42.671	68.672	23	43	2nd Street – Capitol	Directional T interchange; access to Harrisburg Transportation Center
Pennsylvania	Dauphin	Harrisburg	43.149	69.442	24	44A	PA 230 (Cameron Street)	Northbound exit PA 230 (Cameron Street); southbound exit 13th Street to PA 230
Pennsylvania	Dauphin	Harrisburg	43.450	69.926	25	44B	17th Street	Southbound exit and entrance
Pennsylvania	Dauphin	Harrisburg	43.653	70.253	25	44B	19th Street	Northbound exit and entrance
Pennsylvania	Dauphin	Harrisburg	44.658	71.870	26	45	To Paxton Street	Northbound exit and entrance; access via 32nd Street
Pennsylvania	Dauphin	Harrisburg	45.512	73.244	26	45	Paxton Street / Bass Pro Drive	Southbound exit and entrance
Pennsylvania	Dauphin	Swatara Township	45.927	73.912	27	46A	I-283 south to I-76 Toll / Penna Turnpike – Harrisburg International Airport, Lancaster	Eisenhower Interchange; northern terminus and exits 3A-B on I-283
Pennsylvania	Dauphin	Swatara Township	46.852	75.401	28	46B (NB); 47 (SB)	US 322 east / Eisenhower Boulevard – Hershey	South end of US 322 overlap; Eisenhower Blvd. not signed northbound
Pennsylvania	Dauphin	Lower Paxton Township	47.940	77.152	29	48	Union Deposit Road	
Pennsylvania	Dauphin	Lower Paxton Township	49.220	79.212	30	50	US 22 (Jonestown Road)	
Pennsylvania	Dauphin	Lower Paxton Township	50.688	81.574		51	I-81 / US 322 west to I-78 east – Carlisle, State College, Hazleton, Allentown	Northern terminus; signed as exits 51B (north) and 51A (south); north end of US 322 overlap; I-81 exit 70
1.000 mi = 1.609 km; 1.000 km = 0.621 mi: Concurrency terminus; Electronic toll collection; Incomplete access

== Auxiliary routes ==
I-83 has one auxiliary route: I-283, a connector from I-83 south to I-76 (Pennsylvania Turnpike) and PA 283 southeast of Harrisburg.

== Business route ==
Interstate 83 Business
- Location: York, Pennsylvania
- Length: 5.28 mi (8.50 km)
- Existed: 1961–present

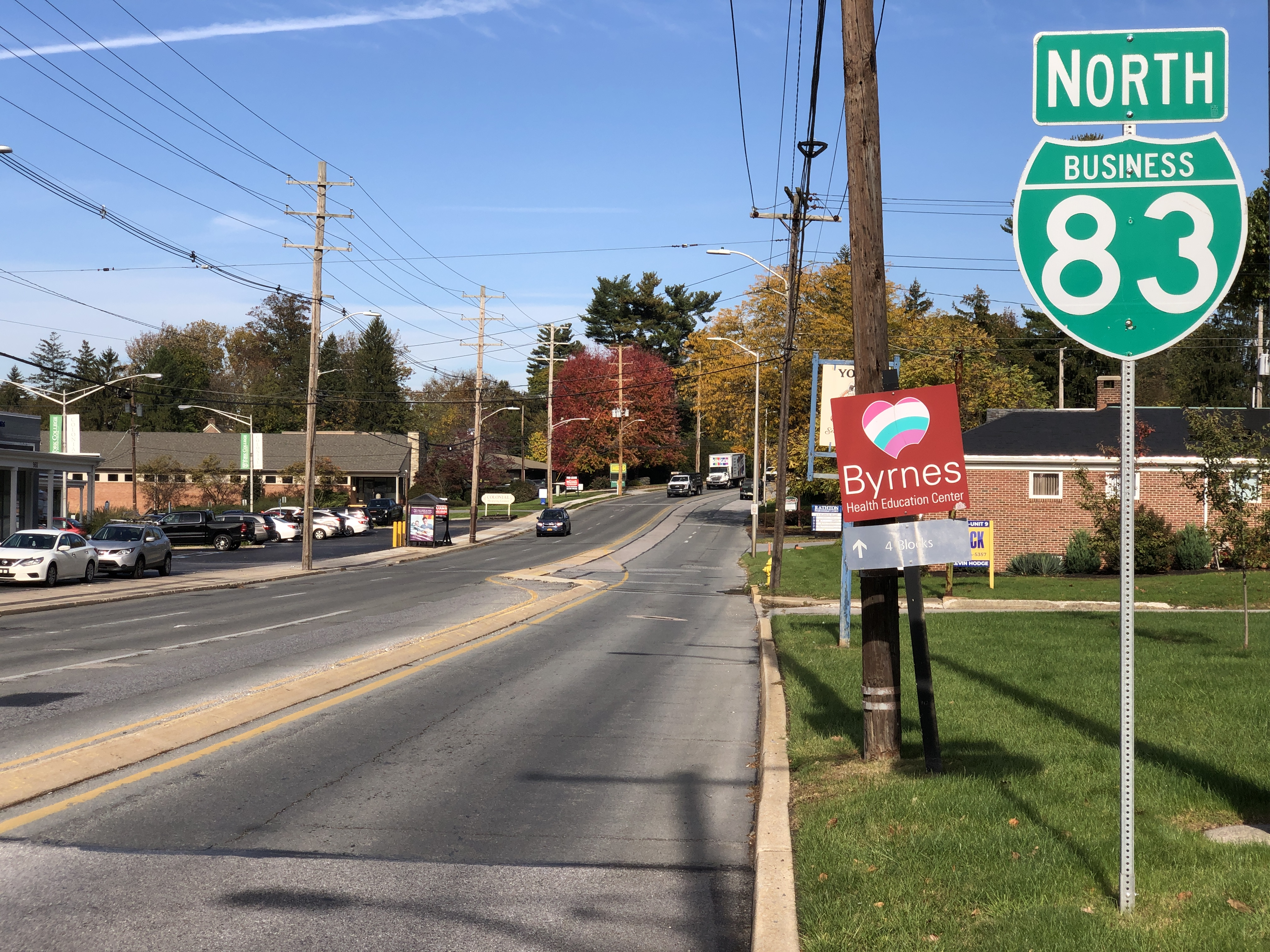
I-83 Bus. northbound entering York

Interstate 83 Business (I-83 Bus.) is a short business loop in York, Pennsylvania. It begins at a semidirectional T interchange with I-83 south of York, continuing north as a freeway for two miles (3.2 km) before the freeway ends at a partial interchange with South George Street, with a southbound exit and northbound entrance. The route continues north along George Street through downtown York, intersecting PA 74/PA 462 before leaving the city and intersecting US 30. Here, PA 181 begins and runs north concurrent with I-83 Bus. for a short distance before I-83 Bus. ends at an interchange with I-83. PA 181 continues north past the northern terminus of I-83 Bus.

From its designation in 1961 until the designation of I-376 Bus. in 2009, I-83 Bus. was the only business route of an interstate highway in Pennsylvania.

=== Major intersections ===
The entire route is in York County.

Location	mi	km	Destinations	Notes
York Township	0.00	0.00	I-83 – Harrisburg, Baltimore	Southern terminus; I-83 exit 15
York	1.86	2.99	South George Street	Southbound exit and northbound entrance
York	1.86	2.99	Northern end of freeway section	
York	3.34– 3.44	5.38– 5.54	PA 74 / PA 462 (Market Street / Philadelphia Street)	
Manchester Township	4.87	7.84	US 30 (Arsenal Road) to I-83 south – Gettysburg, Lancaster PA 181 begins	South end of concurrency with PA 181
Manchester Township	5.43	8.74	I-83 / PA 181 north (North George Street) – Harrisburg, Baltimore, Emigsville	Northern terminus; I-83 exit 22
1.000 mi = 1.609 km; 1.000 km = 0.621 mi: Concurrency terminus; Incomplete access
