= Druid Lake =

Lake in Washington County, Wisconsin, United States

- Location within Wisconsin Location within the United States
- Location: Washington County, Wisconsin
- Coordinates: 43°16′34.1″N 88°24′11.12″W
- Lake type: kettle
- Primary inflows: Ashippun River
- Primary outflows: Ashippun River
- Surface area: 120 acres (0.49 km^{2})
- Average depth: 25 ft (7.6 m)
- Max. depth: 53 ft (16 m)
- Water volume: 966,278,555 US gal (3.65776223×10^{9} L; 804,595,208 imp gal)
- Shore length^{1}: 2.3 mi (3.7 km)
- Surface elevation: 93.55 m (306.9 ft)
- Islands: 0
- ^{1} Shore length is not a well-defined measure.

Druid Lake is a kettle lake located in the town of Erin, Wisconsin, Washington County, Wisconsin near Hartford, Wisconsin. Druid Lake is a natural glacial-formed lake. Druid Lake is surrounded by rugged mixed woods and glacial drumlins in the Southern Savannah Region of southeastern Wisconsin's Kettle Moraine area about 25 miles northwest of Milwaukee. The lake has a maximum depth of 53 feet (16 m). The lake covers 120.9 acres (0 km^{2}), has 2.3 miles (3.7 km) of shoreline and has an average depth of 25 feet (10 m).

== Fish species present ==
- Bluegill
- Largemouth bass
- Northern pike
- Walleye
- Yellow perch
- Yellow bass
- White bass
- Warmouth
- Pumpkinseed
- Black crappie
- Carp
- Yellow bullhead
- Rock bass

== Usage ==
- Launch fee: Yes
- Ramp type: Concrete
- Number of ramps: 1
- Trailer parking spots: 4–5

== Organizations associated with this lake ==
- Druid Lake P & R District
- "Druid Lake Property Owners Association". Archived from the original on 2 June 2010.
