= Historically notable Scout camps =

List of notable Scout camps

Historically Notable Scout camps
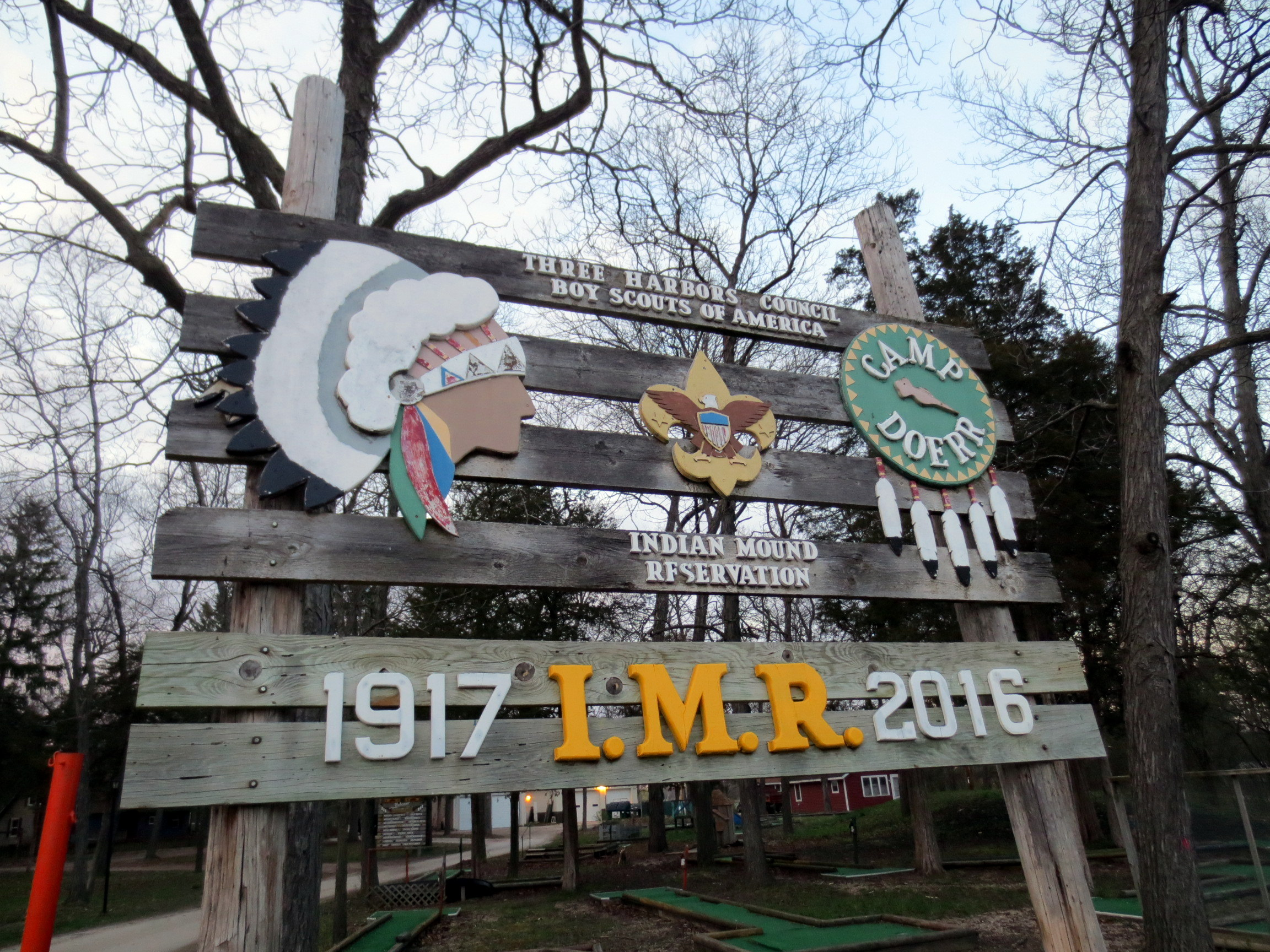
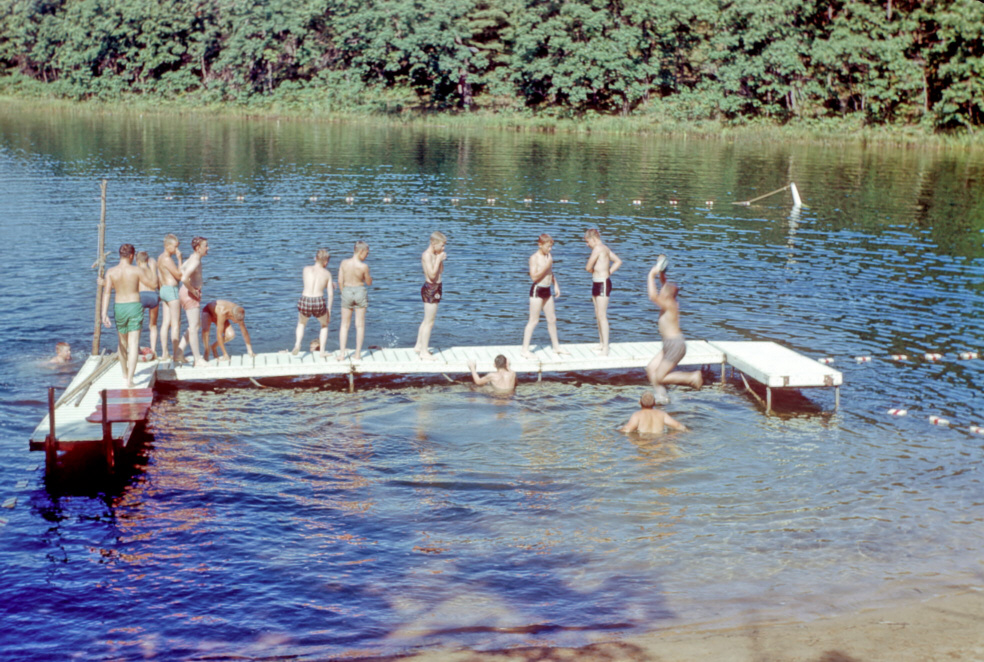
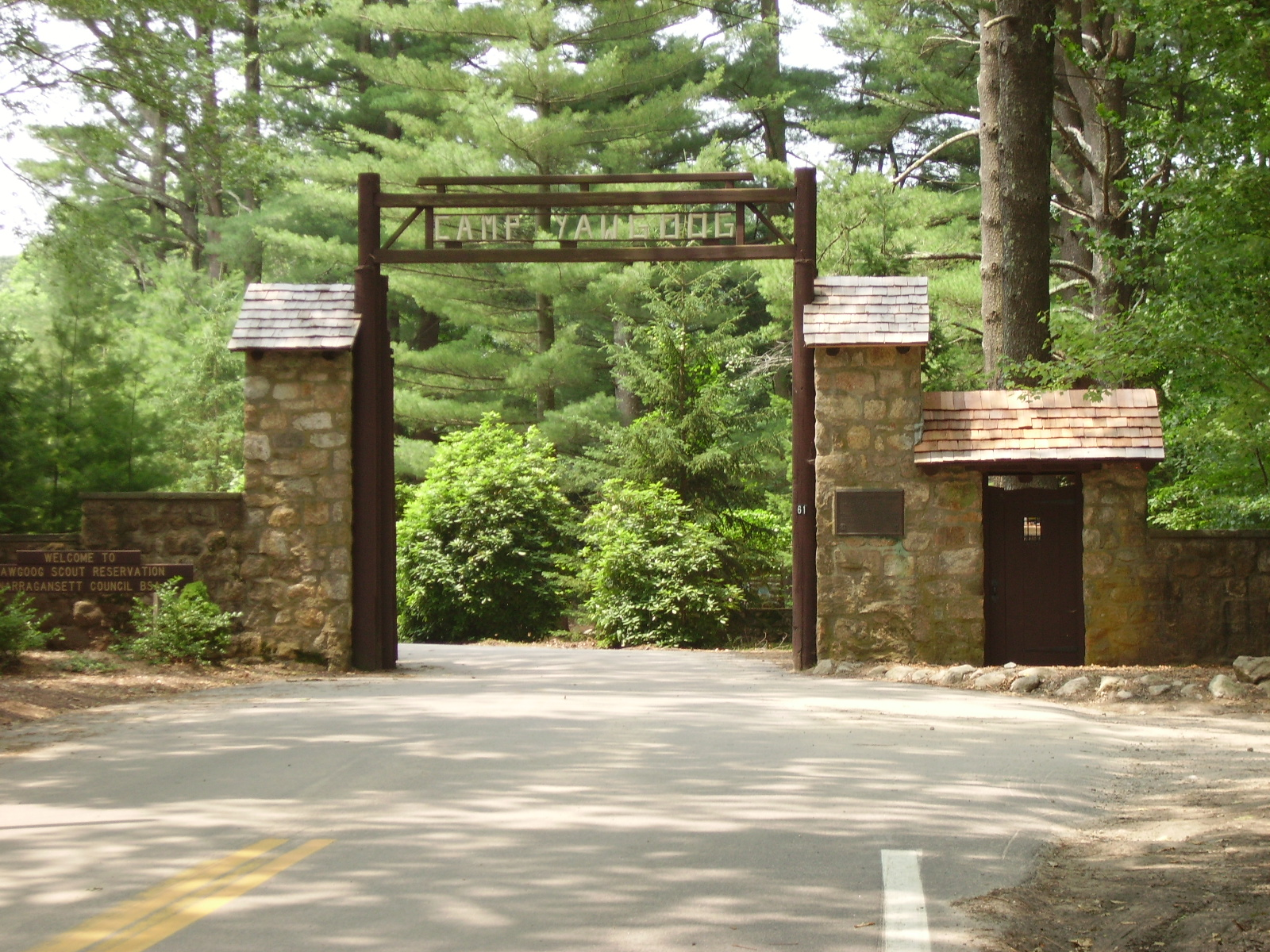
- Indian Mound Scout Reservation Owasippe Scout Reservation in 1959 Gates of the Yawgoog Scout Reservation

There are hundreds of scout camps around the world. Some of these are historically notable Scout camps. Each Scouting association runs its own camp. For example, in the United States, a number of national camps are run by the Boy Scouts of America, and the local councils run the greatest number of camps. The two most important factors in establishing notability are the age of the camp, and its impact on the local community or country where it is located.

== Oldest Boy Scout Camps of the BSA ==
In the United States, summer camps were an important part of 20th century culture. Many camps are notable for their impact, few are more than 80 years old. The oldest scout camp is the Owasippe Scout Reservation in Michigan founded in 1911 by the Chicago Area Council. In 2026 Owasippe celebrated 115 years in continuous operation.^{[a]}

Part of camp culture are the societies of "honor campers." (i.e. "Tribe of Owasippe," Camp Teetonkah's "Tribe of Keokuk," Camp Delmont's "Order of the Tipi," "Old Guard of Glen Gray," "Knights of Yawgoog Honor Society," "Stambaugh Tribe of Good Indians," Camp Indian Mound's "Tribe of Ku-ni-eh," Camp Miakonda's "Tribe of Gimogash," Camp Belzer's "Firecrafters," Scouthaven's "Tribe of Wokanda," Camp Friedlander's "Tribe of Ku-ni-eh," and the "Order of the Silver Marmot" at Camp Parsons).^{[a]} Treasure Island was the birthplace of the Order of the Arrow in 1915.

=== Camp Belzer ===
Originally named Camp Chank-Tun-Un-Gi, 130 acres (53 ha) Camp Belzer was founded in 1918 by the Central Indiana Boy Scout Council. Located near Indianapolis, Indiana. It was named after local philanthropist and the creator of the Firecrafter organization, Francis O. Belzer ("The Chief").^{[a]}

=== Camp Conewago ===
Located near New Oxford, Pennsylvania, 25 acres (10 ha) Camp Conewago was purchased in 1919 by the officers of Conewago Council. Purchased by a local trust and independent of the BSA, the camp has an endowment to provide funds for materials for maintenance. The New Birth of Freedom Council operates the camp. Summer Camp was last held there in 1948.^{[a]}

=== Camp Delmont ===
Located along the Unami Creek in Marlborough Township, Pennsylvania, Camp Delmont was created in 1916, the camp, and the adjoining Hart Scout Reservation, became part of the Musser Scout Reservation after the council merger with the Philadelphia Council. The camp name is a portmanteau of the two counties (Delaware and Montgomery) covered by the original owner, the Valley Forge Council.^{[a]}

=== Camp Friedlander ===
Established in 1919, Camp Friedlander, is located in Loveland, Ohio and run originally by the Cincinnati Area Council and, after mergers, currently by the Dan Beard Council. The camp is 76 acres (31 ha) and was donated to the Scouts by Edgar Friedlander. It is now part of the larger Dan Beard Scout Reservation.^{[a]}

=== Camp Glen Gray ===
Camp Glen Gray was located near Mahwah, New Jersey in the Ramapo Mountains in Bergen County, New Jersey. Founded in 1917 by Frank Gray for the Montclair Council, the 150 acres (61 ha) camp is named after Frank Gray, a well known early professional Scouter of that area. The camp is now a Bergen County Park and is independently managed and financially supported by The Friends of Glen Gray, Inc.

=== Indian Mound Scout Reservation ===
Founded in 1917 by the Milwaukee County Council, Indian Mound Scout Reservation, near Oconomowoc, Wisconsin, gets its name from the 1,000-year-old Indian mound in the middle of the camp. The mound is shaped somewhat like a lizard or turtle. The 291 acres (118 ha) Scout reservation has two camps on it.

=== Camp Miakonda ===
- Camp Miakonda was founded in 1917 and is located in Sylvania, Ohio by the Toledo Council. Originally a weekend camp, it became a summer camp in 1924.

=== Owasippe Scout Reservation ===
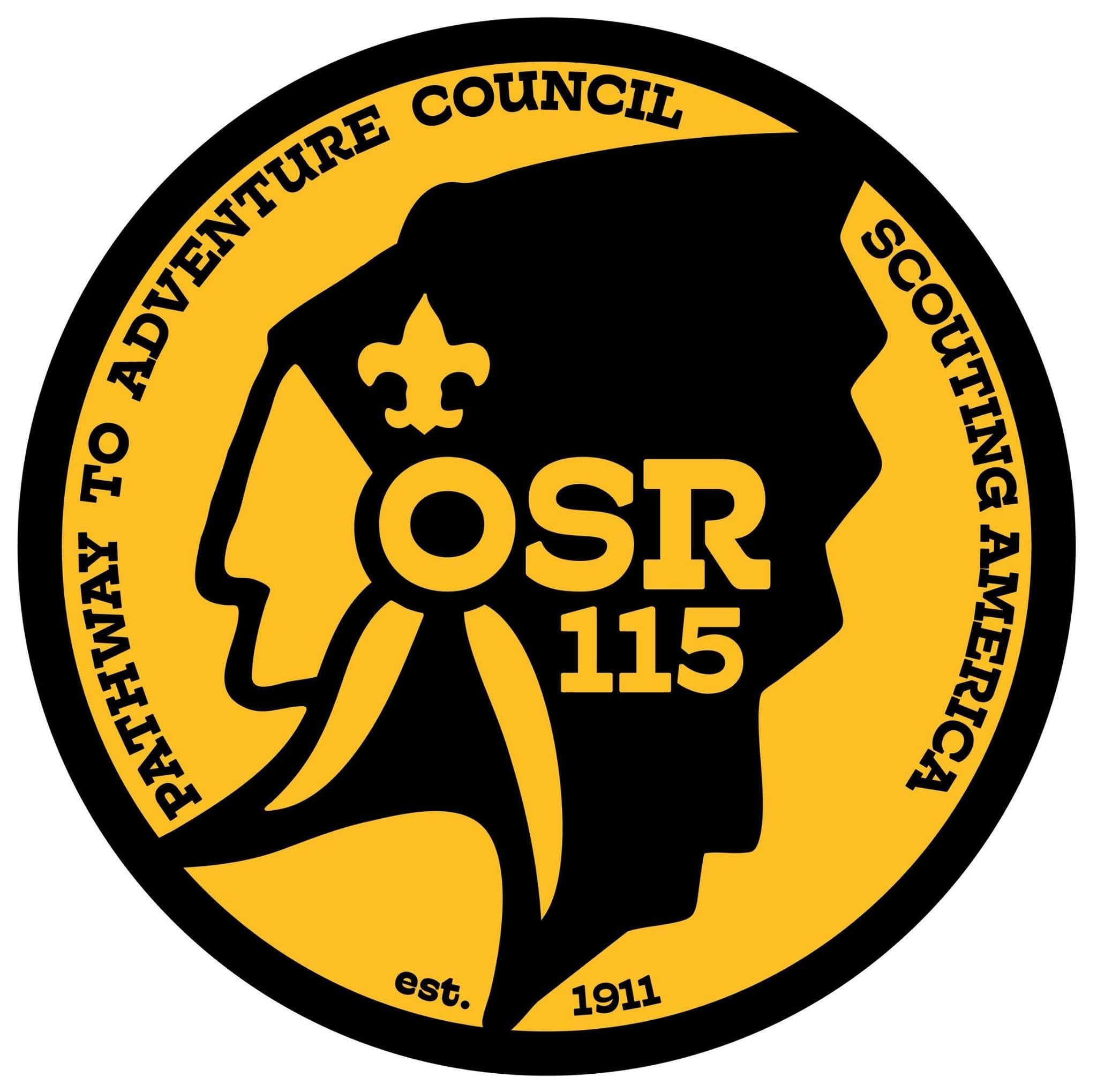
Owasippe Scout Reservation logo, 2026

In 1911, the Chicago Area Council founded Owasippe Scout Camps near Whitehall, Michigan. Starting with 40 acres (16 ha), the camp eventually grew to 14,000 acres (5,700 ha) in size. The reservation lies within the boundaries of Manistee National Forest. The Northwest border of the camp is formed in part by the White River.^{[a]} The reservation is composed of sub-camps within the property. The current operating sub-camps are Camp Blackhawk (Scouts BSA camp), Camp Wolverine (Scouts BSA and Cub Scouts), and Camp Reneker (Family Camp). There is also a high adventure base at Owasippe featuring a high ropes course, river trips on the White River, mountain biking, ATV courses, and a horse ranch.

Owasippe is currently staffed by 200 Scouters serving an average of 5,000 Scouts over 7 weeks every season.

=== Camp Parsons ===
Camp Parsons, located on the Hood Canal near Brinnon, Washington, was founded in 1919 by the Chief Seattle Council. The 165 acres (67 ha) property is a former logging camp and is the oldest continuous BSA camp in the Western United States. The camp was named after the council's first president, Reginald Parsons, who purchased and donated it to the Scouts.^{[a]}

=== Scouthaven ===
Located near Arcade, New York, Scouthaven was founded 1918 by the Buffalo Council. At first, the camp was named Camp Crystal, after Crystal Lake. It was renamed to Scouthaven in 1923. Early in its history, Scouts arrived on a "milk train" that passed by the camp. The 400 acres (160 ha) site was an amusement park in the first part of the 20th century.^{[a]}

=== Camp Stambaugh ===
In 1919, Henry H. Stambaugh, upon his death, donated his 86 acres (35 ha) farm in Canfield, Ohio, known as Indian Creek Farm, to the Youngstown Council. The first summer camp opened on July 4, 1919, and the camp has been in continuous operation since then. With the merger of the Mahoning Valley Council, Western Reserve Council and the Northeast Ohio Councils summer camp programs at Camp Stambaugh were moved to Camp Stigwandish.

=== Camp Teetonkah ===
In 1916, the Jackson Council established Camp Teetonkah near Jackson, Michigan. Teetonkah served as a summer camp until the mid-90s. After nine councils in the lower peninsula of Michigan merged in the early 2010s, Teetonkah was evaluated and determined to take the place of Camp Rota-Kiwan and Camp Munhacke, both of which were closed in 2019. The Michigan Crossroads Council now uses Camp Teetonkah as a Cub Scout Camp, a weekend BSA camp, and the Southern District Michigami Lodge OA camp.^{[a]}

=== Treasure Island Scout Camp ===
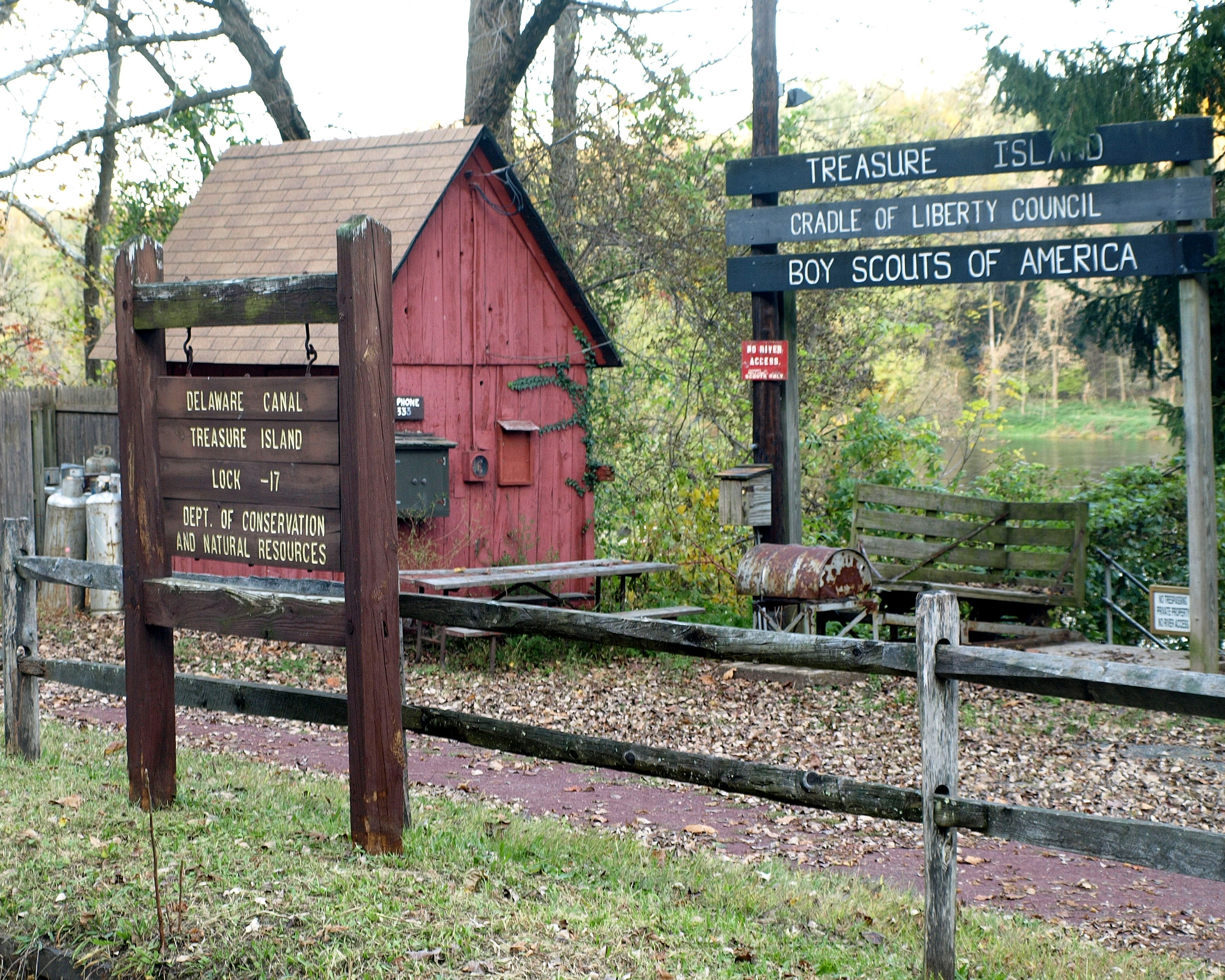
Treasure Island Boat Ramp on the canal

- Treasure Island Scout Camp was founded in 1913 by the Philadelphia Council, located between Point Pleasant, Pennsylvania and Frenchtown, New Jersey. The camp closed in 2006, but has reopened under private ownership. It was announced on March 2, 2018, that Treasure Island was sold to Haubert Outdoor Oriented Adventure Hospitality, LLC, a family-owned business that intends to re-open the historic property as a commercial family campground. Haubert, with a partnership with the Friends of Treasure Island, have made Treasure Island available to Scouts free of charge.It is the birthplace of the Order of the Arrow and is located in the Delaware River.

=== Camp Wakenah ===
Camp Wakenah was founded on Gardner Lake near Salem, Connecticut by the Pequot Council. The camp was sold in the 1930s to buy the second Camp Wakenah at a dif.ferent location on Gardner Lake which consisted of 34 acres (14 ha). The camp was last used as a summer camp in 1972, and was sold by the Connecticut Rivers Council in 2004.

=== Yawgoog Scout Reservation ===
- Yawgoog Scout Reservation was established in 1916 with land purchased by the Rhode Island Boy Scouts. Named after a Narragansett Indian Chief, it is located near Rockville, Rhode Island.^{[a]}

=== High Adventure Programs of the BSA ===
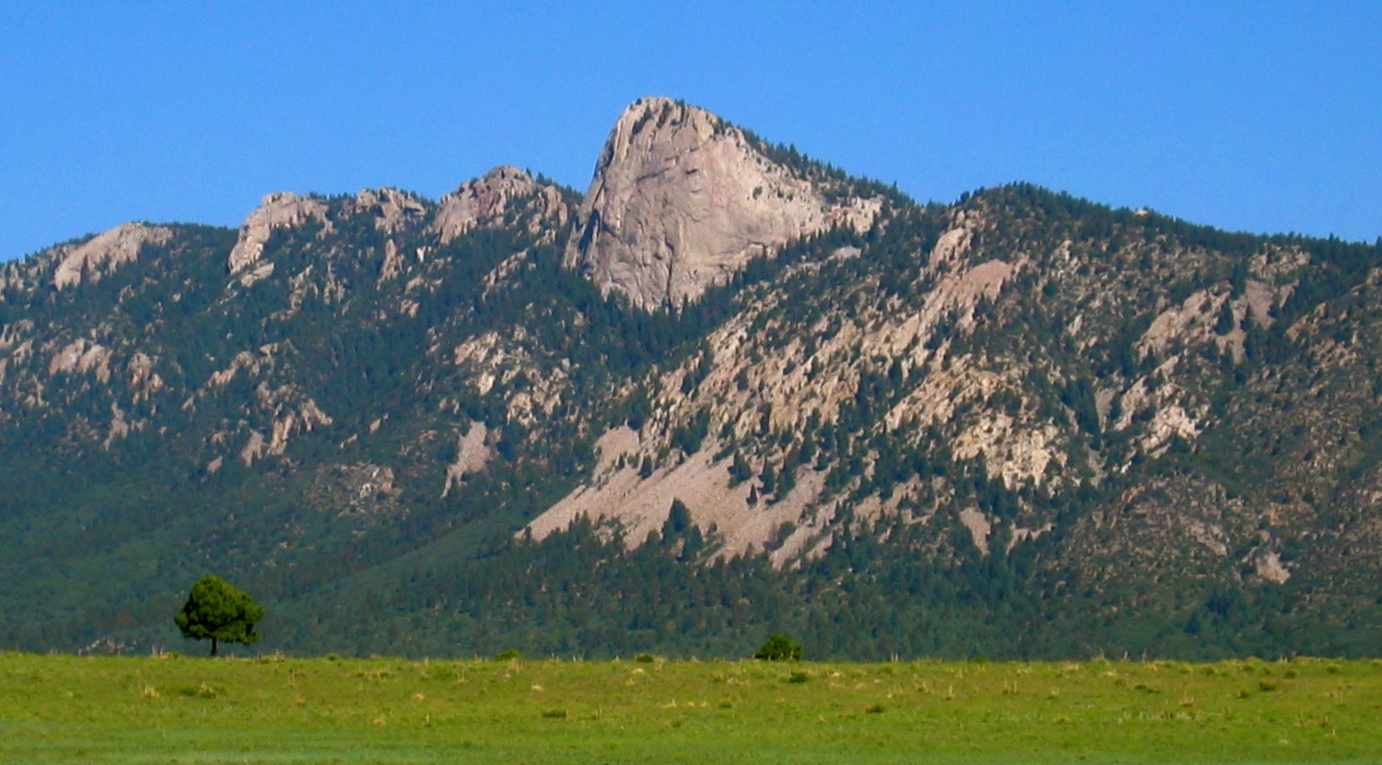
The Tooth of Time, an icon of Philmont Scout Ranch

- Philmont Scout Ranch is located in Cimarron, New Mexico. It has thirty-four staffed camps and fifty-five trail camps. Its programs include horseback riding, burro packing and racing, gold panning, chuck wagon dinners, interpretive history, rock climbing, mountain biking, and rifle shooting. It is primarily famous for its countless 7, 9, and 12 day backpacking courses that can stretch more than 40 miles long.
- Florida National High Adventure Sea Base is located in Islamorada, Florida on the end of Lower Matecumbe Key. It focuses on Venturing and Scout High Adventure. Its programs include scuba certification, tall ship sailing, fishing, snorkeling, swimming, kayaking, and ecology activities.
- Northern Tier National High Adventure Bases is located in Ely, Minnesota. It focuses on Venturing and Scout High Adventure. Its programs include canoe trips in Minnesota, Quetico Provincial Park and the Canadian Crownlands, as well as winter skiing, snowshoe expeditions, and dog sledding.
- The Summit Bechtel Family National Scout Reserve is located near the New River Gorge National River in southern West Virginia.

== Notable camps of the GSUSA ==
=== Camp Bonnie Brae ===
Established in the Berkshire Mountains in 1919 by the Springfield Girl Scout Council, the 200 acres (81 ha) Camp Bonnie Brae is today, the oldest continuously operated camp of the GSUSA. It is located on the northeast shore of Big Pond in East Otis, Massachusetts. It is currently operated by the Girl Scouts of Central and Western Massachusetts.^{[a]}

== Scout camps of Canada ==
=== Camp Tamaracouta ===
Founded in 1912 by the Quebec Council, the 400 hectares (990 acres) Camp Tamaracouta is Canada's oldest Scout camp. It is located near Mille-Isles in the Laurentian Mountains, 60 kilometres (37 mi) northwest of Montreal.^{[a]} Founded in 1933, the Knights of Tamara Society is the camp's honor society.

== Scout camps of Mexico ==
=== Meztitla Scout Camp School ===
Founded in 1956, the Meztitla Scout Camp School is the national Scout camp and school owned by the Asociación de Scouts de México, A.C., located in the Central Highlands of Mexico, northeast of the municipality of Tepoztlán, in the state of Morelos. It is located 30 miles (48 km) south of Mexico City and 9 miles (14 km) northeast of Cuernavaca.

== Scout camps of the United Kingdom ==
=== Brownsea Island Scout camp ===
Brownsea Island was the site of the first boys' camping event organized by Lieutenant-General Baden-Powell to test his ideas for the book Scouting for Boys.

=== Gilwell Park ===
Gilwell Park is one of twelve national centres run directly by or in partnership with the Scout Association. It is the original home of Wood Badge training.

== See also ==
- List of council camps (Boy Scouts of America)
- List of summer camps
- Scout Activity Centres
- World Scout Centres
