= York Council =

York Council may be:

- City of York Council
- York Council (Pennsylvania)
