= Mahlon Haines =

American businessman and philanthropist

Mahlon N. Haines
- Born: John Morrison Haines; March 5, 1875; Old Washington, Ohio, US
- Died: October 31, 1962 (aged 87); York, Pennsylvania, US
- Education: Maryland Agricultural College
- Known for: Shoe sales, philanthropy
- Spouses: June Brown Irwin (m. 1909; died 1951) Grace Marianne Churchill (m. 1957–1962)
- Children: 3, with first wife

Mahlon Nathaniel Haines (March 5, 1875 – October 31, 1962) was an American businessman and philanthropist in York, Pennsylvania. Haines arrived in York in 1905 where he became very successful at selling shoes. Referred to as the "Shoe Wizard", Haines shared his wealth with his community and employees. A local residential subdivision and adjacent road are named after him. His most evident legacy is the Haines Shoe House in Hallam, which is readily visible from U.S. Route 30 east of York.

== Early life ==
Haines was born in Old Washington, Ohio, on March 5, 1875. His father died a few months later. His widowed mother, Elizabeth Ann Morrison Haines, changed his name to that of his father. The family moved to Washington, D.C., in 1882 and lived above a store she owned on 11th Street SE; it was there that Haines worked for much of his early life. The store's profits helped pay for his education and Haines enrolled at Maryland Agricultural College (now known as the University of Maryland) in 1892. That same year, his mother built a much larger department store in Washington, advertised as "the largest store in the world, built, owned and controlled by a woman".

Haines left college in 1894 to begin his adult life. After his mother denied his request at age 28 to become a business partner, he went to California and was a sales representative for several clothing stores in the West. Becoming engaged, Haines moved to Ohio to get married. When the relationship was broken off, he began a bicycle trip back to Washington to get his old job back. Haines later summarized his status then as "single, penniless and alone".

== Business ==
1920s hand fan promoting Haines' business

Arriving in York, Pennsylvania in 1905 – the year he turned 30 – Haines' bicycle broke down. He reportedly sold his engagement ring, bought ten pairs of shoes, and sold them at a farmers market. Haines initially rented a 3rd-floor apartment at 473 W. Market Street. After borrowing money to begin a business, he was bankrupt within two years. He then obtained a consignment of shoes for $127 from the local D.S. Peterman & Co. warehouse. With a combination of hard work and gimmickry, Haines became very successful in the shoe business. A particular gimmick for which he was known was his use of a customized Ford as a mobile retail store, which he would drive to the outer edges of town to show his products. In 1922 he had accumulated 30 stores. By 1931, Haines had the largest shoe store chain in the United States, and there were 50 Haines Shoe Co. stores across Pennsylvania and northern Maryland by 1935.

Six of Haines' stores were within the city of York (117 South George, 231 North George, 101 East Market, 241 West Market, 725 East Market, and 13 West Philadelphia Streets), with three of them in buildings he owned, all designed by John A. Dempwolf. The three-story "Haines Building", opened in 1915 on North George Street, also served as headquarters for his shoe company; it was torn down in the 1960s for off-street parking spaces. He built another four-story Haines Building at 101 East Market Street in 1922 and sold it in 1954 after having donated the shoe store space to organizations such as the Boy Scouts and Bundles for Britain; as of April 2017, the building was being renovated for business use with ten new apartments on the upper floors. Haines had the five-story building on West Philadelphia Street built in 1925 as a 45-room hotel; he converted it to an apartment building in 1940 and it endures as of 2016 with its "Haines" name across the original main entrance threshold.

== Philanthropy and legacy ==
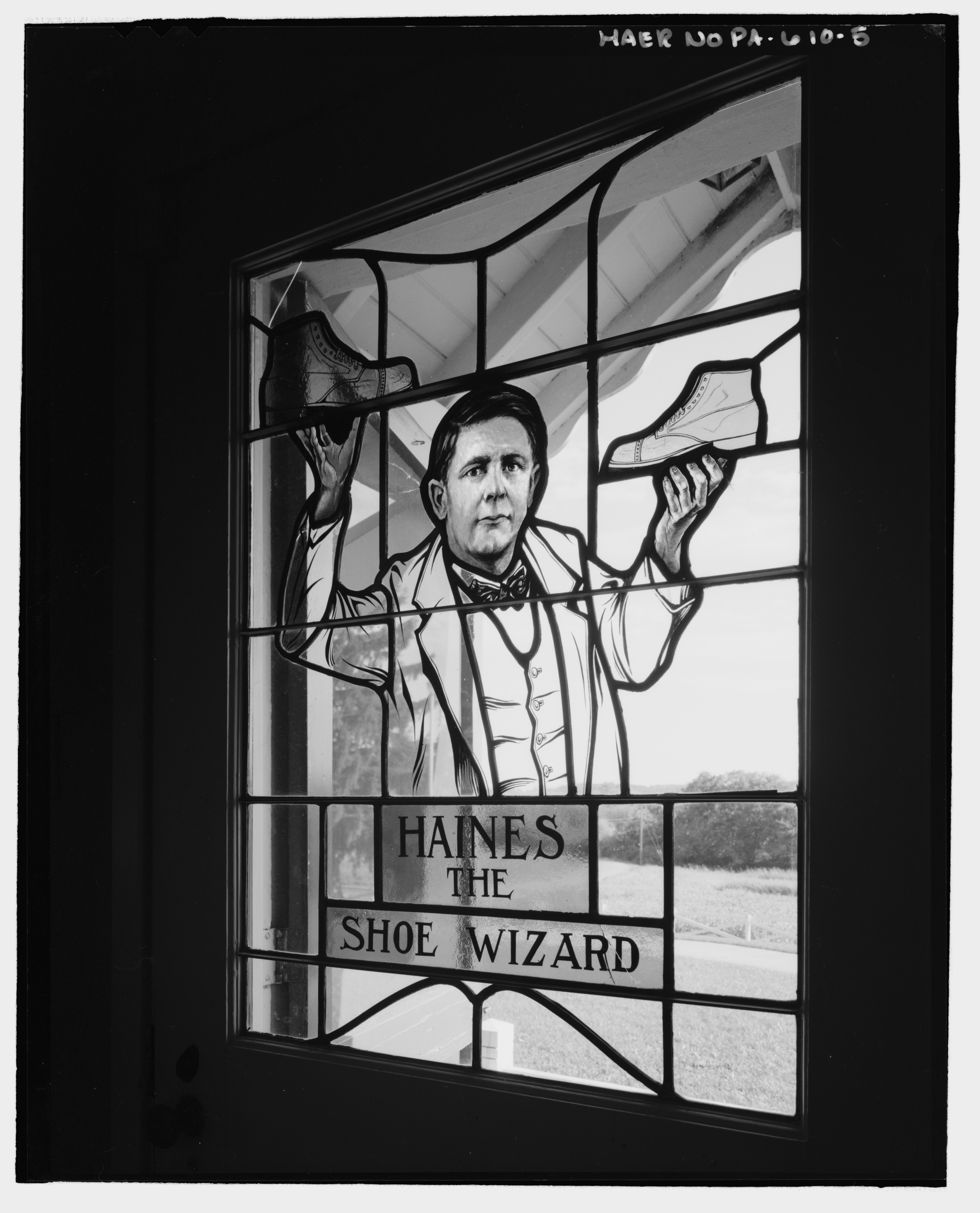
A depiction of Haines in the shoe house's door glass

Haines regularly gave back to his customers and community.

=== Politics ===
In 1922, Haines ran as the Republican candidate from Pennsylvania's 22nd District to the U.S. House of Representatives, though he lost to Democratic challenger Samuel F. Glatfelter.

One month before his death, Haines attended a September 1962 campaign rally in Hershey for Republican gubernatorial candidate William Scranton, at which former President Eisenhower spoke. Amid the event's fervor, Haines reportedly stood on a chair, identified himself as the oldest Republican in the room, and announced a tripling of his admission contribution.

=== Yorkshire and Haines Park ===
In October and November 1924, Haines bought 318 adjoining acres (0.497 sq mi; 129 ha) of land which became known as Yorkshire Ranch. In the late 1920s, he donated a plot of land which became part payment for the first permanent Springetts Fire Company station. After the Great Depression in 1929, he built streets through the ranch land and offered free housing lots to those unemployed who agreed to build homes there, as he began developing the Yorkshire neighborhood. Haines built a two-room brick schoolhouse in the development in 1930, initially leased for $1 per year to the township's Independent School District. Expanded over the years since, these original school buildings were torn down to create playgrounds for the new Yorkshire Elementary School built adjacently in 2010.

When York Fairgrounds turned down his request to use their horse track, Haines built a half-mile "Haines Park" track in 1928 on a corner of his ranch near what is now the intersection of Northern Way and Eastern Boulevard. Horse races were held weekly and in 1930 the track became the first in the state to have weekly night races with overhead electric lighting. The park also hosted a rodeo for which all proceeds benefitted the Springetts Fire Company.

Haines hosted a celebration in September 1938 to commemorate his 33 years in York. Applying his "Shoe Wizard" nickname, Haines placed a half-page ad in newspapers throughout York County announcing a week-long series of evening entertainment for the public at Haines Park and other venues at his expense.

After World War II the York Horse Show was held at Haines Park. In 1952, most members of the county horsemen's association were convinced to move to the York Fairgrounds for their major shows, and the last show at Haines Park was in mid-August 1952. Haines sold the 55-acre (22 ha) Haines Park to Eastland Realty Company in summer 1953, who developed the track area into a trailer park which remained into the 1960s. In the 1970s, a Best Products store was built on the infield of the former track, a building which later became the regional headquarters for AAA.

=== Boy Scouts ===
Haines owned 300 acres (0.47 sq mi; 120 ha) of fields and woodlands in eastern York County and beginning in 1941, he hosted a special "Haines Safari" gathering of area Boy Scouts there about every five years to celebrate his birthday. After the fifth such gathering in 1960, Haines donated the land to the York-Adams Area Council of Boy Scouts. Known as "Wizard Ranch", the scouts have year-round camping on the grounds and continue to organize "Wizard Safari" events there every four to five years, drawing thousands of attendees. Haines received the Silver Antelope Award from the scouts in 1944. The Lancaster County Conservancy bought the Wizard Ranch land in 2018, to become part of the Hellam Hills Nature Preserve, and still allow the scouts to use it for safari events and camping. In May 2023, the Wizard Ranch land opened to the public with two hiking trails and a new parking area off Accomac Road.

=== Shoe House ===
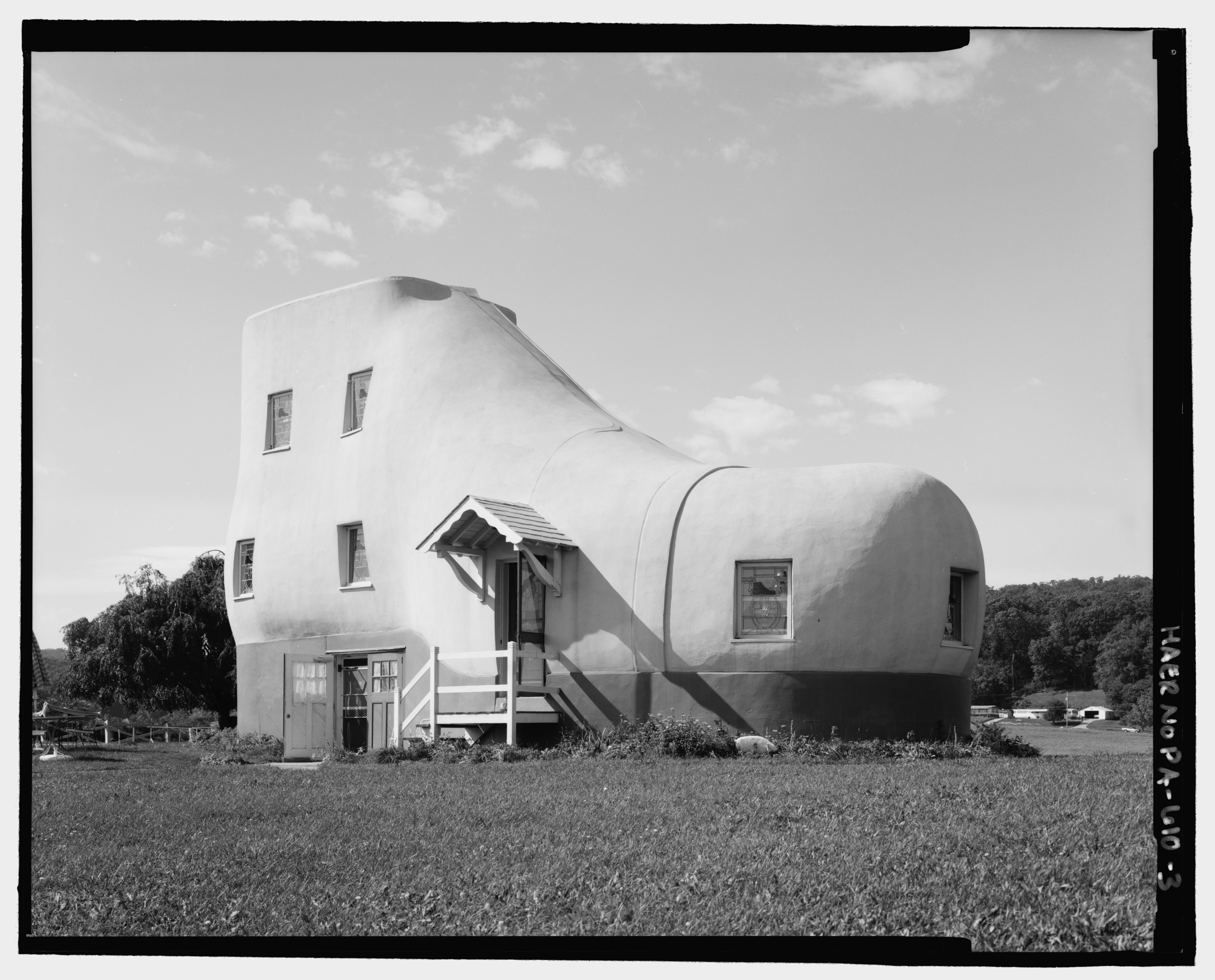
Haines Shoe House in 1999

It was in 1948 that he began construction of the Haines Shoe House in Hallam with three bedrooms, two bathrooms, a kitchen, and a living room. Via a newspaper ad in July 1949, he publicly thanked 20 local businesses that had a part in the project. Its exterior modeled after a work boot, Haines lived in the house briefly before using it to host older couples and honeymooners affiliated with his shoe stores, providing them with a free weekend in the house, the service of his staff, and a free pair of shoes. The house was offered to the public for rent in the 1950s.

=== Alma mater ===
In late 1948, Haines "took a very active part in the Chapter meeting of Agricultural alumni" at his Maryland alma mater and stated "he would personally pay the subscription cost for any agricultural alumnus who did not feel financially able" to request the alumni publication.

=== Haines Acres ===
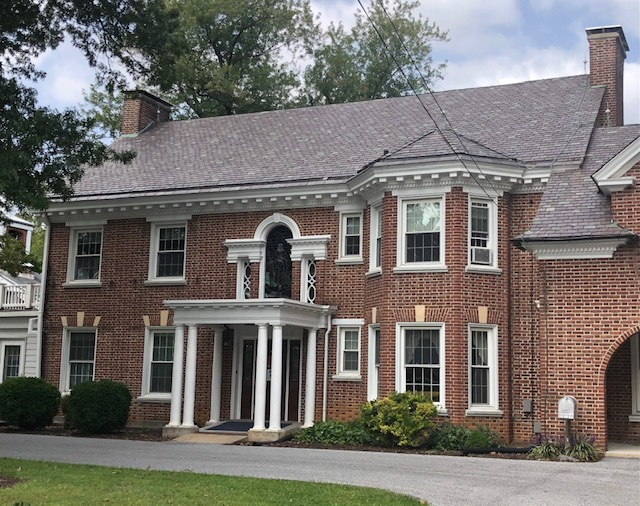
Haines' home for 30 years, now part of Eastminster Presbyterian Church

In December 1917, Haines bought 199 acres (0.311 sq mi; 81 ha) of what became a 211-acre (1/3 sq mi; 85 1/3 ha) farm east of York in Springettsbury Township. Named Haines Acres, along what would later be named Haines Road, he built his home on the farm in 1922. Haines sold the home to a local surgeon in 1952. The surrounding farm was sold to local real estate firm Epstein & Sons in November 1953, and it was developed into the Haines Acres subdivision. He gave $2,500 to the Boy Scouts in exchange for the housing development being named after him. The farm buildings were eventually demolished and their land became part of the development in the 1970s. Haines Acres Shopping Center, constructed beginning in 1962 in the southwest corner of the subdivision, also bears his name. Haines' former home remains as part of a Presbyterian church at 311 Haines Road. From Haines Acres, he moved into "The Hermitage", which he built across the street from the Shoe House.

=== Employees and others ===
After selling a 4,000-acre (6.3 sq mi; 1,600 ha) cattle ranch in South Dakota in 1960, Haines gave his shoe business to 28 key employees. He also gave substantial gifts to farmers of his land, boy and girl scouts, YMCA, YWCA, his church, and York Hospital.

In 1953, Haines was featured in the short Paramount film The Spirit of Seventy, which promoted the value of physical exercise. Haines founded a "Three Quarter Century Baseball Team" for senior citizens in St. Petersburg, Florida, near a winter home he had in Snell Isle. He attributed his own success at the game to staying fit and abstaining from alcohol and tobacco. The film was shown before featured attractions nationally to 1955, and first in York at the Elmwood Theatre.

Upon dying, Haines gave the Haines Shoe House to his employees. The house has since had a series of owners and was a museum and an ice cream and gift shop, before becoming an Airbnb rental property in late 2022.

== Personal life ==
=== Mother ===
As a widow, Haines' mother, Elizabeth Ann Morrison Haines, moved to Washington, D.C., in 1882 and became a successful businesswoman. After ten years of living with her children above a small store on 11th Street S.E., they moved to Seward Square and she hired architect Julius Germuiller to design a large department store building at Eighth Street and Pennsylvania Avenue, S.E. Completed in 1892, it was advertised as "the largest store in the world, built, owned and controlled by a woman". She is known to have donated to leaders of the 1894 Coxey's Army protest march. Much of her store was burned in a 1905 fire, and she decided to sell it in 1910. The 65,000-square-foot (6,000 m^{2}) building was expected to sell for about $30 million in 2019.

Haines' mother had an orange and grapefruit plantation on the Isle of Pines – at that time an American territory before it was returned to Cuba in 1925. In January 1913, Haines left on a primarily steamship trip to visit her there, going with Edward Schaszberger, the father-in-law of a friend in the Dempwolf family. Haines' mother met former Philippine province governor William F. Pack on the island, and they married about June 1913. Governor Pack Road in Baguio is named for him. The Packs visited her daughter in Washington in July 1915, from which they were then to visit Haines in York.

=== First wife ===
Haines married June Brown Irwin (1885–1951) of Union County on October 20, 1909. They had three children: Stanley Emerson (1910–1966), Mahlon Nathaniel II (1912–1960), and June Irwin (1916–1918).

The Haines's first suburban residence was designed by John A. Dempwolf in 1912 and occupied in April 1913, at the intersection of North Rockburn and East Philadelphia Streets in Springettsbury Township, and still standing in 2018.

In July 1951, Haines bought the former Kreutz Creek One-Room Schoolhouse with plans to use it as a public lecture hall dubbed the "Haines School of Brains". Haines gave up such plans after his wife died unexpectedly two months later, and sold the building in October. It still stood as a private residence as of 2019.

=== Second wife and death ===
Haines first met second wife Grace Marianne Churchill of London, England, while on a westward trans-Atlantic steamship cruise in summer 1955. After much correspondence, the two married on June 5, 1957. Grace was 30 years younger and this was her first marriage.

In 1961, Haines placed his "Hermitage" home, across from the Shoe House, up for sale. He and his second wife had planned to build a new "Churchill Downs" estate along Accomac Road near his Wizard Ranch property. Their plans included a large, enclosed riding arena that could host horse shows. Haines was never able to finish negotiating a land purchase for this project, however.

Haines died on October 31, 1962, while under intensive care after collapsing with a "heart ailment" a few days after undergoing "a successful operation".
