= Haines Shoe House =

Shoe-shaped house in south-central Pennsylvania, U.S.

Coordinates: 39°59′56″N 76°38′13″W

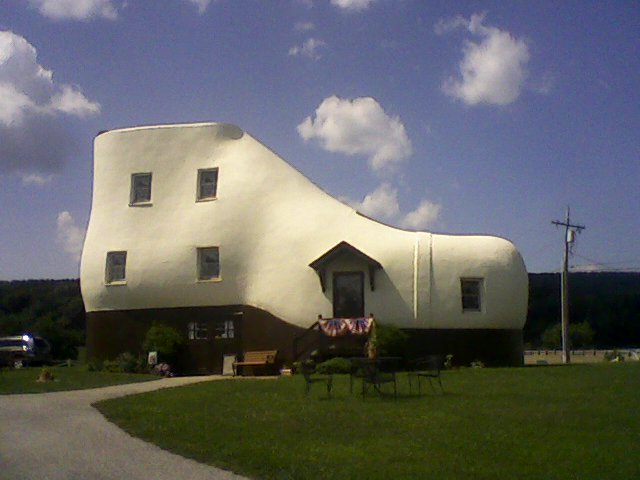
- in 2008
- Interactive map of the Haines Shoe House area

General information
- Location: Hellam Township, Pennsylvania, 197 Shoe House Road, York, Pennsylvania, United States
- Construction started: 1948
- Construction stopped: 1949
- Owner: Waylon and Naomi Brown (2022)

Height
- Height: 25 feet (7.6 m)

Dimensions
- Other dimensions: 17 feet (5.2 m) wide, 48 feet (15 m) long

Design and construction
- Architect: Fred J. Rempp

Website
- www.hainesshoehouse.com

The Haines Shoe House is a shoe-shaped house in Hellam Township, Pennsylvania, about two miles west of the borough of Hallam, on Shoe House Road near the Lincoln Highway. The house is 25 feet (7.6 m) high, 17 feet (5.2 m) wide, and 48 feet (15 m) long, and is visible from U.S. Route 30 (US 30).

Built by Mahlon Haines in 1948 to promote his shoe stores, the house was initially provided as a vacation spot for newlyweds and senior couples. Subsequent owners have offered it for public rental or operated it as a museum and ice cream shop. Most recently, it became an Airbnb rental property.

== History and design ==
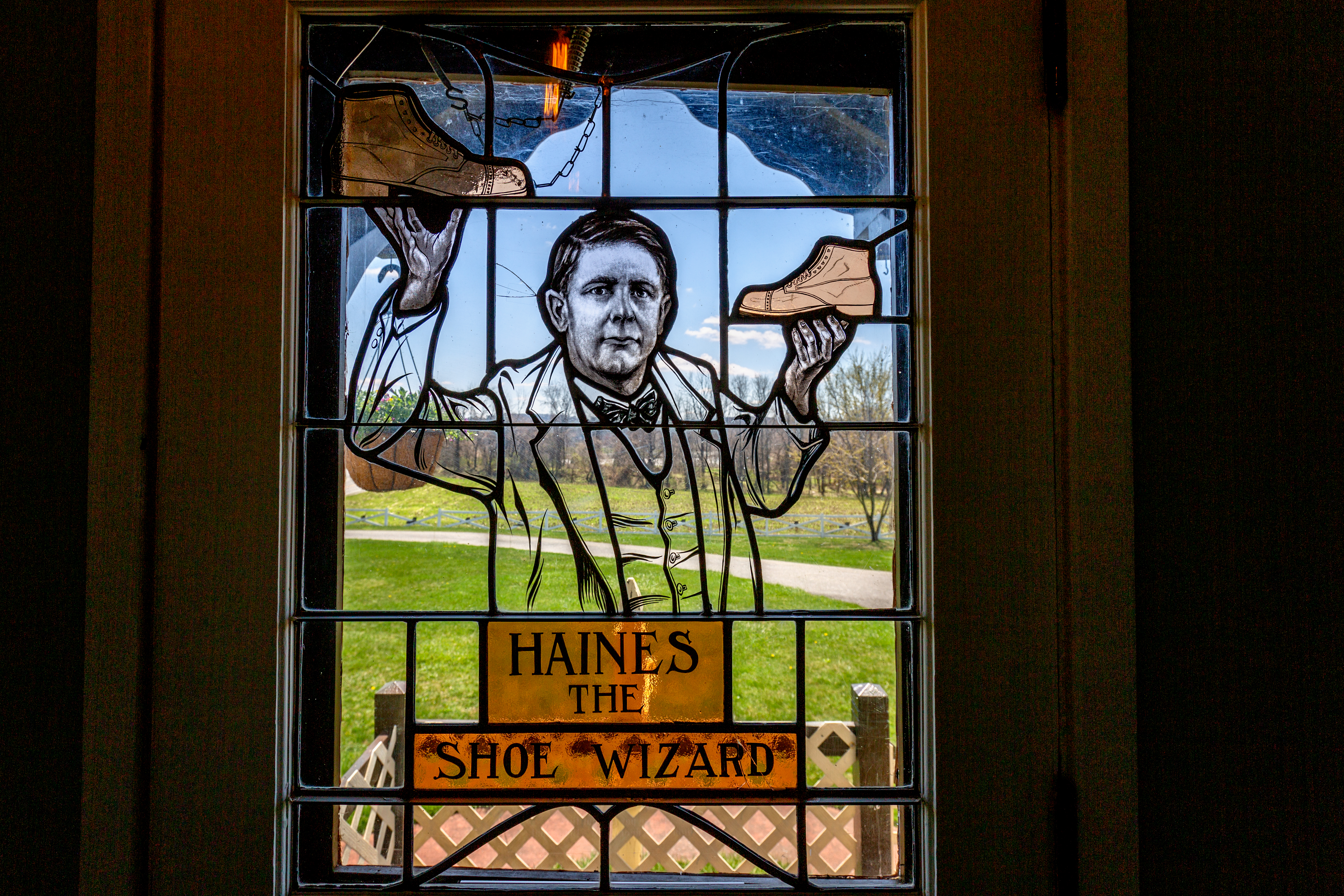
Haines The Shoe Wizard

Modeled after a work boot, the house was built by shoe salesman Mahlon Haines in 1948 as a form of advertisement. His shoe business claimed it made shoes "from hoof to hoof" because the company began the process with raising the cattle. The house, which is 25 feet (7.6 m) tall and contains five stories, was once rented out to couples, and then was open for public tours. It is located on Shoe House Road, next to a shoe-shaped doghouse. Haines requested the design by handing a work boot to an architect and saying, "Build me a house like this." The living room is located in the toe, the kitchen is located in the heel, and two bedrooms are located in the ankle. The instep was originally a garage for the house's resident vehicle; this was later used as an ice cream shop and has since been converted to a recreation room. There is also a stained glass panel that shows Mahlon holding a pair of shoes with a message below it that reads, "Haines the Shoe Wizard". Fire escapes were added in the 1960s.

== Rental and ownership ==
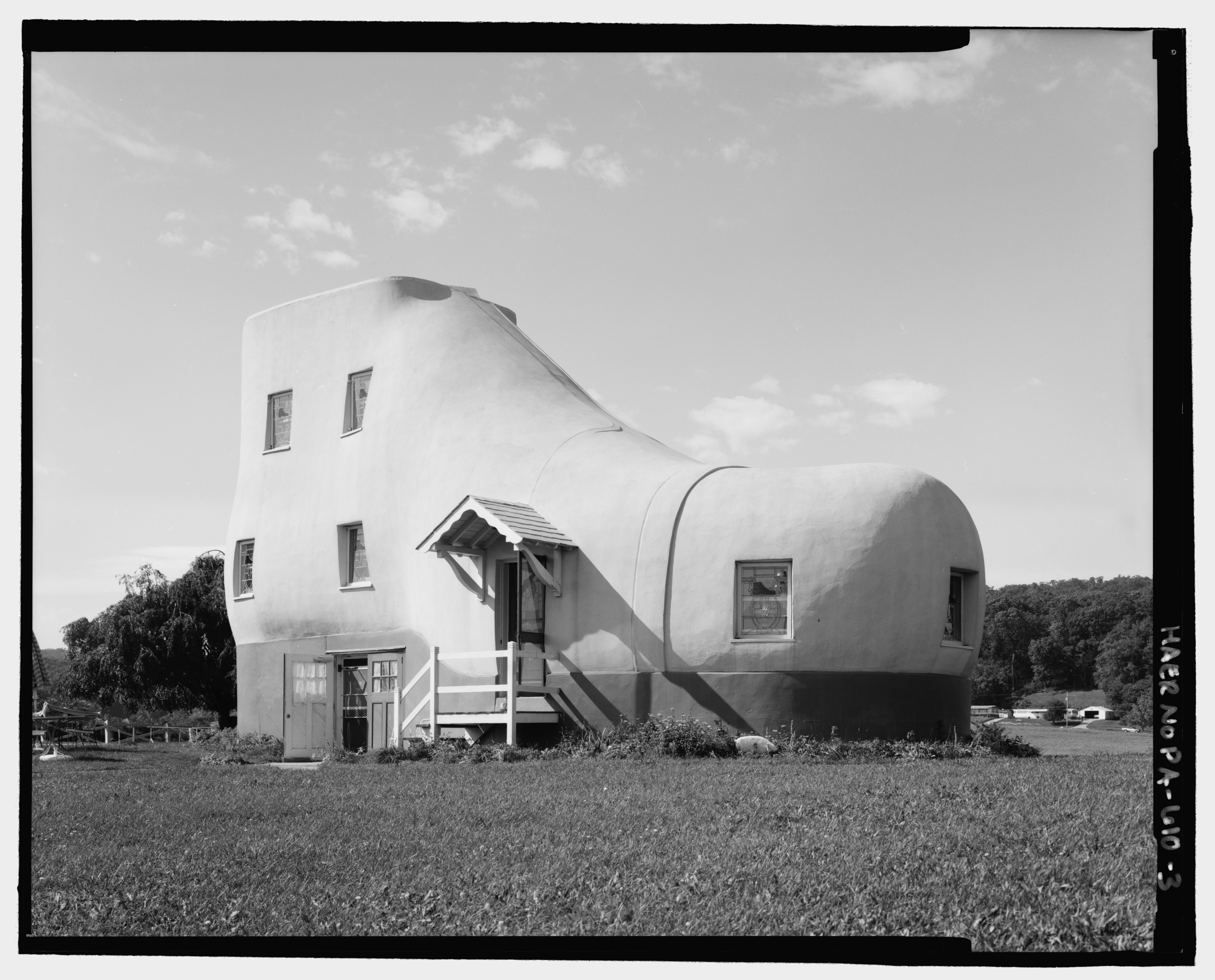
A 1999 view of the house

Haines never lived in the shoe house but in his later years after marrying his second wife he built a home across the street. The shoe house was initially made available as a weekend vacation spot for 38 elderly couples a year; the first such couple were John F. and Liza Baum of Loganville. Shoe House vacation contests were also held for a few seasons among newlyweds affiliated with Haines' shoe stores; an early winner in 1950 had all expenses paid for a week, including the service of a maid and chauffeur, and went home with a free pair of shoes. The house was offered for rent by the public in the mid-1950s.

Upon Haines' death in 1962, the house was given to his employees, who sold it two years later to a dentist; after about 20 years of tours and service as an ice cream parlor, it started going to ruin until it was bought in 1987 by Haines' granddaughter, Annie Haines Keller, who began renovations. After Keller could no longer maintain the house, it was sold to Charles and Ruth Miller, who gave tours for eight years before selling it in 2003 to Colleen and Ronald Farabaugh. The house received a small renovation and new paint in 2007. The seventh owners were Jeff and Melanie Schmuck, who bought the house in 2015. In 2018, with help by a local lift truck company, a water leak in the house's "toe" was repaired and the exterior was painted in the original canary-yellow color, with a brown sole and highlights added. Co-owner Melanie Schmuck died from "health complications" in February 2019. In late June 2022, Jeff Schmuck announced that a local family was buying the house at the end of July, with plans to offer it for rental via Airbnb; public tours were to have ended on July 24, 2022. Completion of the sale to Waylon and Naomi Brown was announced in August. Four beds provide sleeping space for up to six people in three renovated bedrooms named "Shoelace Space", "Instep Suite", and "Ankle Abode". All rooms are reportedly filled with shoe memorabilia, and "shoevenirs" are available for sale on the lowest level. The property began rentals via Airbnb in late 2022.

The Shoe House was visited in the eighth season of the reality television series The Amazing Race, originally broadcast in 2005, and was featured on HGTV's What's With That House in 2007. The Farabaughs were happy about the publicity though not permitted to talk about the house's appearance on The Amazing Race until two years later.

The Shoe House received a historical marker from the Pennsylvania Historical and Museum Commission in July 2023. In July 2025, the house was given top honors among three featured in the second-season premiere of HGTV's Zillow Gone Wild.
