= Camden Council =

Camden Council may refer to:

- Camden London Borough Council
- Camden Council (New South Wales)
- Camden Council, Boy Scouts of America
