= Burlington Council =

Burlington Council may be:

- Burlington Council (Iowa)
- Burlington Council (New Jersey)
- Burlington Council (Vermont)
- Burlington County Council (New Jersey)
