= York County Council =

York County Council may be:

- York County Council (Maine)
- York County Council (Pennsylvania)
