= Jack McBrayer =

American actor and comedian (born 1973)

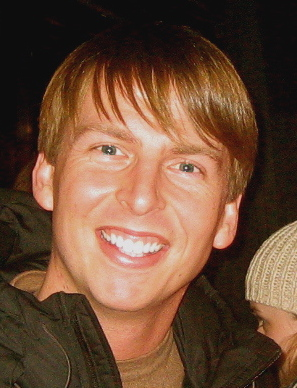
- McBrayer in 2007
- Born: Jack McBrayer; May 27, 1973 (age 53); Macon, Georgia, U.S.
- Education: University of Evansville (BFA)
- Occupations: Actor; comedian
- Years active: 1995–present

Jack McBrayer (/məkˈbreɪ.ər/; born May 27, 1973) is an American actor and comedian. He gained national exposure for his portrayal of Kenneth Parcell in 30 Rock. For his role in 30 Rock, McBrayer was nominated for Primetime Emmy Award for Outstanding Supporting Actor in a Comedy Series at the 61st Primetime Emmy Awards. He voiced characters such as Fix-It Felix Jr. in the 2012 film Wreck-It Ralph and its 2018 sequel, as well as the title character in the Disney XD series Wander Over Yonder. He has had recurring roles on Phineas and Ferb, Puppy Dog Pals, Amphibia, The Middle, Star Trek: Lower Decks, and the Netflix series Big Mouth.

McBrayer co-created and stars in the Apple TV+ series Hello, Jack! The Kindness Show, which premiered on November 5, 2021.

He also currently hosts the HGTV series Zillow Gone Wild.

== Early life ==
McBrayer was born in Macon, Georgia, and moved to Conyers, Georgia, when he was 15. He attended Heritage High School and studied theater administration at the University of Evansville. He also spent a semester abroad in England, where he studied at Harlaxton College in Harlaxton, Lincolnshire. At the age of 18 his lung collapsed, the result of a congenital defect. He said that it felt like a heart attack and it was one of the worst pains of his life.

== Career ==
From 1995 to 2002, he worked at The Second City and IO Theater in Chicago, an experience that introduced him to 30 Rock creator Tina Fey and prepared him for his role on her show. McBrayer appeared in over 80 sketches on Late Night with Conan O'Brien (2002–04), often lampooning his own Southern upbringing by playing stereotypical hillbilly characters. On August 10, 2007, and September 20, 2008, he made cameo appearances on Late Night playing Kenneth Parcell from 30 Rock. During the first appearance, O'Brien remarked to him, "I thought you were above this now." McBrayer later reprised his role as Kenneth twice (November 24, 2009, and January 13, 2010) after O'Brien's switch to The Tonight Show. He appeared on O'Brien's Legally Prohibited From Being Funny on Television Tour at stops in Eugene, Oregon, Universal City, California (on the Universal Studios lot where O'Brien taped Tonight), and the final tour stop in Atlanta.

In 2008, he was featured throughout the video for "Touch My Body" by Mariah Carey. McBrayer said he accidentally hit Carey in the face with a Frisbee during the shooting for the video. McBrayer also appears in the first episode in the fifth season of Tim and Eric Awesome Show, Great Job! as a spokesman in a spoof advertisement for the fictional "Diarrhea-phragm." He worked as a voice actor in the American animated series Ugly Americans and has voiced Irving DuBois on Phineas and Ferb since 2009.

In 2010, he played a role in Cats & Dogs: The Revenge of Kitty Galore. He regularly appears in the skit "Knock Knock Joke of the Day" on the hit children's television show, Yo Gabba Gabba! since season 2 and stars in Craig McCracken's TV show Wander Over Yonder on the Disney Channel. In 2011, he also appeared in The Simpsons, in the season 22 episode, "The Great Simpsina" as Ewell Freestone, 'Peach Guy.' In 2012, He had a VA credit of a single episode in Archer "Bloody Ferlin", McBrayer lent his voice to the Disney animated film Wreck-It Ralph, playing the title character's video game opponent and eventual friend Fix-It Felix Jr. In 2013, he starred alongside Los Angeles Clippers player Blake Griffin in Kia commercials, and appeared in a commercial for Barnes & Noble. From 2013-2018 McBrayer played Dr. Ted Goodwin on the ABC sitcom The Middle.

McBrayer's Adult Swim series The Jack and Triumph Show premiered in February 2015. He also appeared on the Adult Swim show Your Pretty Face is Going to Hell as Angel in the episode "Shoulder Work" which garnered him a Primetime Emmy nomination for Outstanding Actor in a Short Form Comedy or Drama Series. In September 2016, on the season 10 premiere episode of The Big Bang Theory, McBrayer played Penny's older brother Randall.

In 2018, McBrayer was one of the actors who voiced the audiobook A Day in the Life of Marlon Bundo. That same year he also reprised his role as Fix-It Felix Jr. in Ralph Breaks the Internet.

In December 2018, it was announced McBrayer would make his West End stage debut in the transfer of the Broadway musical Waitress, playing the role of Ogie, until June 15, 2019. The production opened at the Adelphi Theatre in London on February 8, 2019. In June 2019, he appeared on ITV's The Sara Cox Show. From 2019-2022 he had a recurring role as the voice of Toadie on the Disney Channel show Amphibia.

In 2020, McBrayer had a recurring role on the Quibi comedy-mystery series Mapleworth Murders. In 2021, he appeared as a contestant on a Season 6 episode of the Netflix baking competition series Nailed It!. That same year he also began hosting the children’s television series Hello Jack! The Kindness Show on Apple TV. His work on the show earned him a Children’s and Family Emmy Award nomination for Outstanding Host in 2022. In 2024, he began hosting the show Zillow Gone Wild on HGTV.

== Filmography ==
=== Film ===
Year	Title	Role	Notes
2004	Blackballed: The Bobby Dukes Story	Stuart Applebaum	
2005	The Baxter	Elliot's Friend	Uncredited
2006	Talladega Nights: The Ballad of Ricky Bobby	Glenn	
2007	Walk Hard: The Dewey Cox Story	DJ	
2008	Forgetting Sarah Marshall	Darald	
2009	Spring Breakdown	Stage Manager	Direct-to-DVD
2010	Despicable Me	Carnival Barker, Tourist Dad (voice)	
2010	Cats & Dogs: The Revenge of Kitty Galore	Chuck	
2011	The Brass Teapot	Joe	
2011	Phineas and Ferb the Movie: Across the 2nd Dimension	Irving (voice)	Television film
2012	A Thousand Words	Starbucks Barista	
2012	The Campaign	Mr. Mendenhall	
2012	Wreck-It Ralph	Fix-It Felix Jr. (voice)	
2013	Movie 43	Brian	Segment "iBabe"
2013	Savannah	Sir Graham	
2013	The To Do List	Hillcrest Pool Manager	
2014	Cooties	Tracy	
2014	They Came Together	Oliver	
2015	Katie and Orbie	Wayne	
2015	Bad Night	Motel Clerk	
2016	Odd Squad: The Movie	Weird Tom	Television film with limited theatrical release
2016	Donald Trump's The Art of the Deal: The Movie	Der Scutt	
2017	Smurfs: The Lost Village	Clumsy Smurf (voice)	
2017	Lego Scooby-Doo! Blowout Beach Bash	Policeman (voice)	
2017	We Love You, Sally Carmichael!	Darren	
2018	Dude	Guy	
2018	Ralph Breaks the Internet	Fix-It Felix Jr. (voice)	
2020	Phineas and Ferb the Movie: Candace Against the Universe	Irving (voice)	Deleted scene
2021	Queenpins	Agent Park	
2021	Songs for a Sloth	Edgar the Sloth (voice)	
2024	Big City Greens the Movie: Spacecation	Farmbot (voice)	
2024	Unfrosted	Steve Schwinn	
2025	You're Cordially Invited	Leslie	

=== Television ===
Year	Title	Role	Notes
1999	Early Edition	Teddy, Rehearsal Dinner Toaster	Episode: "The Out-of-Towner"
2002	Late Night with Conan O'Brien	Wally Jenson (uncredited)	Episode #10.27
2005	Weekends at the D.L.	Soldier	Episode #1.12
2005–2006	Arrested Development	Country Club Waiter	2 episodes
2006	The Colbert Report	Kevin (voice)	Episode: "Will Power"
2006–2013, 2020	30 Rock	Kenneth Parcell	139 episodes
2007	My Boys	Paul	Episode: "The Promise of a New Season"
2009	The Electric Company	Marlon	Episode: "Abracadabra Cadabra Ca-Green!"
2009–2015, 2025–present	Phineas and Ferb	Irving (voice)	39 episodes
2010	Tim and Eric Awesome Show, Great Job!	Best Man	Episode: "Comedy"
2010	Ugly Americans	Kong (voice)	Episode: "Kong of Queens"
2010	Robotomy	Frenemy (voice)	Episode: "Frenemy"
2010	Kung Fu Panda Holiday	Wo Hop (voice)	Television special
2011	The Simpsons	Ewell Freestone "Peach Guy" (voice)	Episode: "The Great Simpsina"
2011	Conan	Ghost, Drug Dealer, Conan	3 episodes
2011	Portlandia	Zupan's Market Customer	Episode: "Cool Wedding"
2011	Funny or Die Presents	Park Ranger	Episode #2.4
2011	Archer	Randy (voice)	Episode: "Bloody Ferlin"
2011–2020	Bob's Burgers	Various voices	6 episodes
2013	Deon Cole's Black Box	White History Month Narrator	Episode: "Sweet Home Chicago"
2013	NTSF:SD:SUV::	Tagg	Episode: "Trading Faces"
2013	Key & Peele	Robert	Episode: #3.3
2013	Childrens Hospital	Ballard	Episode: "Coming and Going"
2013–2015	Comedy Bang! Bang!	Chad, Band Camp Register	2 episodes
2013–2016	Wander Over Yonder	Wander (voice)	79 episodes
2013–2018	The Middle	Dr. Ted Goodwin	9 episodes
2013–2019	Drunk History	Various roles	10 episodes
2014	WordGirl	Kid Math / Rexagon (voice)	Episode: "Kid Math"
2014	The Getaway	Himself	Episode: "Jack McBrayer in Hawaii"
2014–2015	Jake and the Never Land Pirates	Pirate Mummy (voice)	7 episodes
2015	Axe Cop	Mr. Chicken Chickenslice (voice)	Episode: "Axe Cop Saves God"
2015	New Girl	Wally	Episode: "Clean Break"
2015	The Jack and Triumph Show	Jack	7 episodes; also executive producer
2015	Your Pretty Face is Going to Hell	Angel	Episode: "Shoulder Work"
2015	Playing House	Rod Rockemoore	2 episodes
2015	The Awesomes	Villain-Tine (voice)	Episode: "Villain-Tine's Day"
2015	The Adventures of Puss in Boots	Esteban (voice)	Episode: "Star"
2015, 2026	Saturday Night Live	Kenneth Parcell/Himself	2 episodes
2015, 2017, 2021, 2026	Last Week Tonight with John Oliver	Himself/Dr. Ted Group III/Oliver's Plague (voice)/Colonel Sanders	5 episodes
2016	The Increasingly Poor Decisions of Todd Margaret	Doug Whitney	6 episodes
2016	The Amazing Gayl Pile	Mitch Maxwell	Episode #3.1
2016	Odd Squad: The Movie	Weird Tom	Television film with limited theatrical release
2016	The Big Bang Theory	Randall (Penny's Brother)	Episode: "The Conjugal Conjecture"
2016	The Lion Guard	Badilli (voice)	Episode: "The Trouble With Galagos"
2016	Emo Dad	Principal Meister (voice)	Season 2
2016	The Eric Andre Show	Himself	Episode: "Stacey Dash; Jack McBrayer"
2016	Bajillion Dollar Propertie$	Phillib Almnall	Episode: "Day of the Diamond Dealmakers"
2016, 2017	Mighty Magiswords	Snax, Orb-Bot, Matt (voice)	2 episodes
2017	Angie Tribeca	Wade	Episode: "License to Drill"
2017	Milo Murphy's Law	Ship Captain (voice)	Episode: "The Island of Lost Dakotas"
2017–2018	Big Mouth	Pubic Hair #1 (voice)	4 episodes
2017–2021	Puppy Dog Pals	Hedgie (voice)	7 episodes
2018	DuckTales	The Ghost of Christmas Past (voice)	Episode: "Last Christmas!"
2019	Our Cartoon President	Lindsey Graham (voice)	3 episodes
2019–2022	Amphibia	Toadie (voice)	10 episodes
2020	Unbreakable Kimmy Schmidt	Sandy Parcell	Special: "Kimmy vs the Reverend"
2020	T.O.T.S.	Hank (voice)	Episode: "Daddy Delivery"
2020	Star Trek: Lower Decks	Badgey (voice)	2 episodes
2020	Woke	Sad Face (voice)	
2021	Devil May Care	God (voice)	Episode: "The Shipment"
2021	Bless the Harts	Deputy Tug, Parker (voice)	2 episodes
2021	Nailed It	Himself	Episode: "Paranormal Pastries"
2021–present	Hello, Jack! The Kindness Show	Himself	17 episodes
2022	Kid Cosmic	Skippy Olsen (voice)	Episode: "Kid Cosmic and the Secret of the Fourteenth Stone"
2022	Eureka!	KB (voice)	2 episodes
2023	The Conners	Jack Fudderman	Episode: "Adding Insult to Injury"
2023	Call Me Kat	Gideon	3 episodes
2023	Kamp Koral: SpongeBob's Under Years	Hatty McDoody (voice)	Episode: "Hats Off to Space"
2023	Hailey's On It!	Lazlo (voice)	Episode: "U.F.Whoa!"
2023	The Big Nailed It! Baking Challenge	Himself (guest judge)	Episode: "Finale"
2023	The Wonder Years	Mr. Cox	Episode: "A Star is Born"
2023	Star Trek: Lower Decks	Badgey (voice)	3 episodes
2024	The Great North	Beef's Penis (voice)	Episode: "Risky Beefness Adventure"
2024	Stupid Pet Tricks	Himself	2 episodes
2024	Zillow Gone Wild	Himself/Host	3 seasons
2024	Grey's Anatomy	Tom Costello	Episode: "I Can See Clearly Now"
2025	Studio C	Guest star	Epidode: "I Know You're Not Real with Jack McBrayer"
2025	Chibiverse	Wander (voice)	Episode: "Grandparent Napped"
2025	Murderbot	Navigation Officer (voice)	3 episodes
2025	Leanne	Stephen	Episode: "Don't Dangle a Dream"
2025	King of the Hill	Museum Tour Guide	Episode: "Bobby Gets Grilled"
2026	Mating Season	Geoffrey	4 episodes
2026	Not Suitable for Work	Himself	Episode: "Denver Is for Lovers"

=== Theater ===
Year	Production	Role	Dates	Location	Category
2017	Crazy for You	Eugene Fodor	February 19	David Geffen Hall, Lincoln Center	Concert
2019	Waitress	Ogie Anhorn	February 8 – June 15	Adelphi Theatre	West End

=== Video games ===
Year	Title	Role
2012	Wreck-It Ralph	Fix-It Felix Jr.
2019	Anthem	Amal

=== Music videos ===
Year	Song	Artist	Album
2008	"Touch My Body"	Mariah Carey	E = MC²

== Awards and nominations ==
=== Children's and Family Emmy Awards ===
Year	Category	Program	Result	Ref.
2022	Outstanding Host	Hello Jack! The Kindness Show	Nominated	

=== Primetime Emmy Awards ===
Year	Category	Program	Result	Ref.
2008	Outstanding Special Class – Short-format Live-Action Entertainment Programs	30 Rock: Kenneth The Web Page	Nominated	
2009	Outstanding Special Class – Short-format Live-Action Entertainment Programs	30 Rock: Kenneth The Web Page	Nominated	
2009	Outstanding Supporting Actor in a Comedy Series	30 Rock	Nominated	
2016	Outstanding Actor in a Short Form Comedy or Drama Series	Your Pretty Face Is Going to Hell	Nominated	

=== Screen Actors Guild Awards ===
Year	Category	Program	Result	Ref.
2007	Outstanding Performance by an Ensemble in a Comedy Series	30 Rock	Nominated	
2008	Outstanding Performance by an Ensemble in a Comedy Series	30 Rock	Won	
2009	Outstanding Performance by an Ensemble in a Comedy Series	30 Rock	Nominated	
2010	Outstanding Performance by an Ensemble in a Comedy Series	30 Rock	Nominated	
2011	Outstanding Performance by an Ensemble in a Comedy Series	30 Rock	Nominated	
2012	Outstanding Performance by an Ensemble in a Comedy Series	30 Rock	Nominated	
2013	Outstanding Performance by an Ensemble in a Comedy Series	30 Rock	Nominated	
