= Germuiller Row =

- U.S. National Register of Historic Places
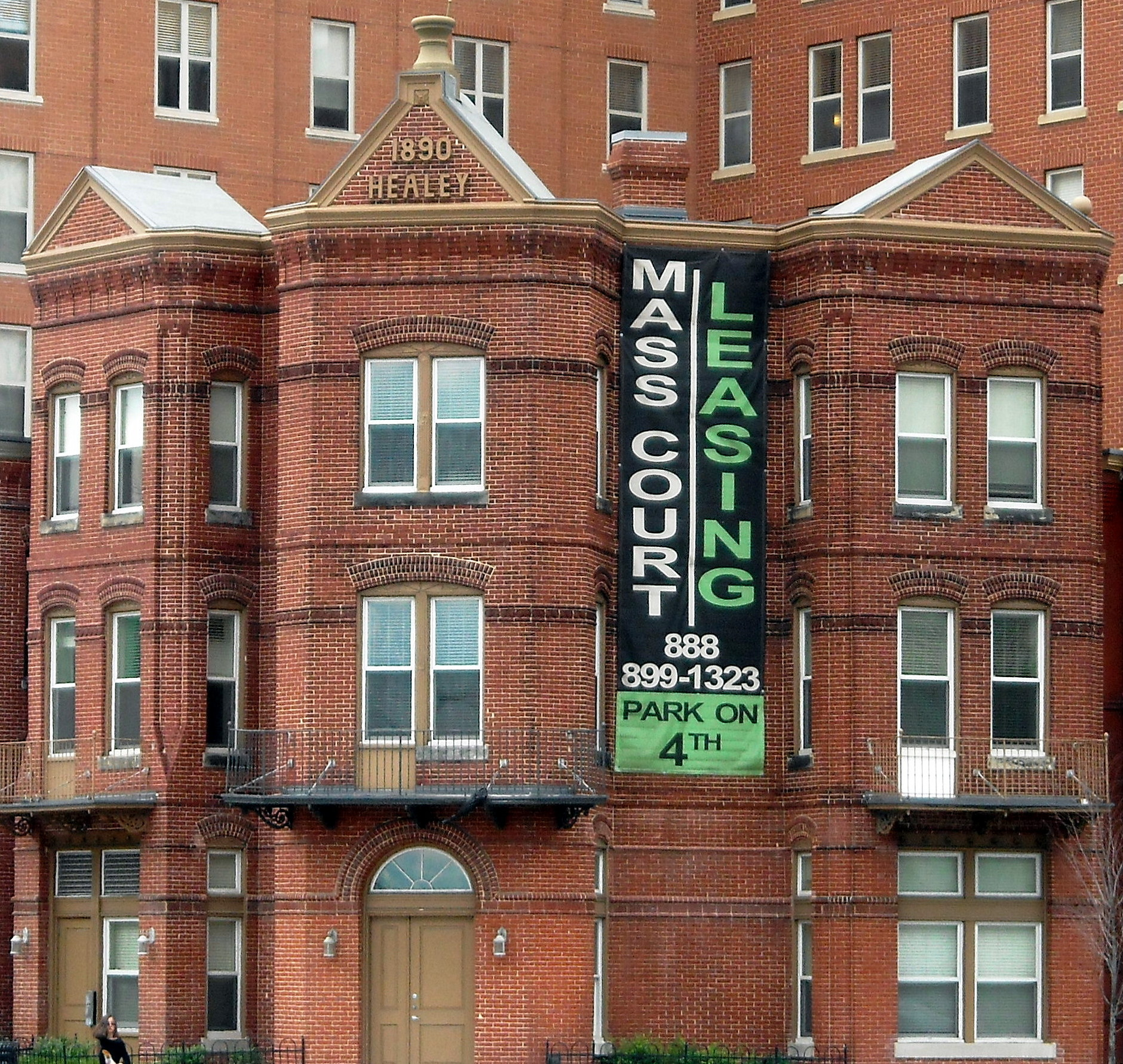

- Location within Washington, D.C.
- Location: 748 3rd Street, NW and 300-302 H Street, NW; Washington, D.C.
- Coordinates: 38°53′59″N 77°0′56″W
- Built: 1888-1891
- Architect: Julius Germuiller
- Architectural style: Late Victorian
- NRHP reference No.: 94001406
- Added to NRHP: December 1, 1994

Germuiller Row are historic structures located in the Chinatown neighborhood of Washington, D.C. It was listed on the National Register of Historic Places in 1994.

== History ==
The collection of three buildings was designed by Washington architect Julius Germuiller. They are an example of the coordination of residential and commercial architecture in the late 19th century. The earliest of the three buildings is a row house at 302 H Street, NW. A commercial building at 300 H Street, NW features a mortar and pestle on the cornice and was completed in 1890. The building at 748 3rd Street is the last of four identical row houses that were completed in 1891.
