= Julius Germuiller =

German-American architect

- Born: Julius Germüller; March 18, 1859; Washington, D.C.
- Died: January 10, 1929 (aged 69); Washington, D.C.
- Occupation: Architect

Julius Germuiller, also spelled Julius Germüller, (March 18, 1859 – January 10, 1929) was a German-American architect from Washington, D.C. Throughout his 44-year career, he designed hundreds of buildings, mostly row houses. His work included designs in every quadrant of the city and a large number of his buildings are still extant. One of his works is listed on the National Register of Historic Places (NRHP).

== Biography ==
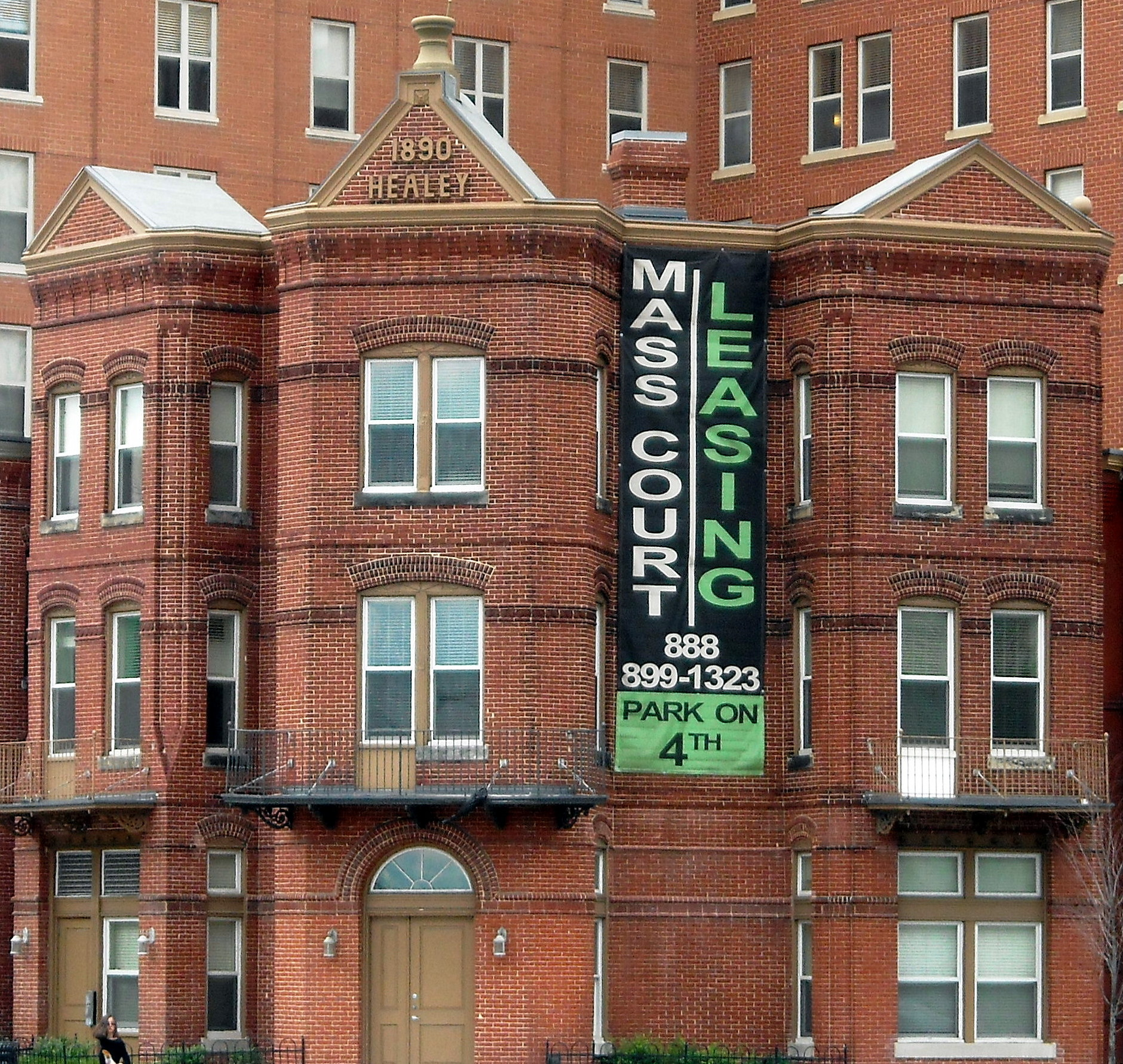
Germuiller Row, designed by Germuiller in 1890

Julius Germuiller was born in Washington, D.C., to Francis and Anna Germuiller, immigrants from Bavaria who had moved to the United States in 1850. Francis operated a saddlery and harness business on 7th Street NW in present-day Chinatown, then a neighborhood with a large German population. It is believed Germuiller attended St. Mary's Catholic School. It's unknown whether or not he attended architecture school or who he apprenticed with, but by 1879, he was listed in the Washington City Directory as an architect.

Germuiller designed more than 300 buildings, most of which were residential, and frequently worked for real estate developers A. Behrends, Diller B. Groff and James Healy. Germuiller's notable clients included Senator John Sherman and General Abraham D. Hazen. He designed six apartment buildings, though the locations of these buildings are unknown. Germuiller's surviving designs include buildings in Bloomingdale, Brightwood Park, Downtown, Dupont Circle, Georgetown, Logan Circle and Mount Pleasant. The largest surviving examples of his designs are in Capitol Hill and Near Northeast. Several of his buildings are contributing properties to historic districts throughout the city and Germuiller Row, a collection of buildings at 3rd and H Streets NW, is listed on the NRHP.

Germuiller retired in the mid-1920s and resided at the Little Sisters of the Poor Home on H Street NE at the time of his death in 1929. He is interred alongside his family at St. Mary's Catholic Cemetery, adjacent to the German Prospect Hill Cemetery in Edgewood. He is considered one of Washington, D.C.'s "most prolific and noted designers of row buildings" of the late 19th and early 20th century and known for his "intricate details and fine ornamentation rendered in brick and stone.

== Selected works ==
- 460 K Street NW (1904)
- 462 K Street NW (1906)
- 512 Florida Avenue NW (1925)
- 516-520 Florida Avenue NW (1925)
- 520-528 3rd Street NE
- 538 3rd Street NE (1895)
- 616 I Street NW
- 819-821 7th Street NW
- 1103-1107 O Street NW (1892)
- 1337 14th Street NW (1912)
- 1351 Wallach Place NW (1897)
- 1403 6th Street NW (1886)
- 1404-1406 12th Street NW (1901)
- 1713 11th Street NW (1885)
- 1804 New Jersey Avenue NW (1896)
- 1810-1812 6th Street NW (1887)
- 1812 5th Street NW (1882)
- 1819 Wiltberger Street NW (1891)
- 2126 R Street NW (1897)
- Germuiller Row (1890)
