= Northern New Jersey Council =

Scouting communities

Northern New Jersey Council (#333)
- Owner: Boy Scouts of America
- Headquarters: Oakland, New Jersey
- Country: United States
- Founded: 1999
- Website http://nnjbsa.org

The Northern New Jersey Council was formed in January 1999 and serves Bergen, Essex, Hudson and Passaic counties as an effort to better serve the Scouting communities encompassed in these areas.

== History ==
In 1915, the Ridgewood Council (#359) was formed, changing its name to the Ridgewood-Glen Rock Council (#359) in 1922. In 1919, the Englewood Council (#339) was formed, changing its name to the Englewood Council (#350) in 1922. In 1915, the Paterson Council (#355) was formed, changing its name to the Paterson Area Council (#355) in 1927. The council changed it name again in 1942 to the Alhtaha Council (#355).

In 1917, the Bloomfield Council (#333) and Nutley Council (#352) were formed. They merged to for the Bloomfield-Nutley Council (#333) in 1929. In 1935, Bloomfield-Nutley changed its name to Tamarack Council (#333). In 1915, the South Bergen County Council (#360) was formed, merging into the Tamarack Council (#333) in 1935.

In 1913, the Montclair Council (#346) was formed. In 1918, the Caldwell Council (#334) was formed. In 1915, the Glen Ridge Council (#821) was formed. In 1931, the Montclair, Caldwell, and Glen Ridge councils merged to become the Eagle Rock Council (#346) in 1931.

In 1915, the East Orange Council (#337) was formed. In 1917, the Orange (#353) and West Orange (#363) councils were formed. In 1917, the South Orange Council (#345) was formed, changing its name to the Orange Mountain Council (#345) in 1919. In 1933, the East Orange, Orange, West Orange, and Orange Mountain councils merged to form the Oranges and Maplewood Area Council (#337). Oranges and Maplewood Area Council changed its name to Orange Mountain (#337) in 1949.

In 1919, the North Hudson Council (#351) was formed, changing its name to the Alexander Hamilton Council (#351) in 1937. In 1921, the Hoboken Council (#341) was formed. In 1918, the Jersey City Council (#342) was formed. In 1936, the Hoboken and Jersey City councils merged to become the Hudson Council (342).

In 1915, the Newark Council (#349) was formed, changing its name to the Robert Treat Council (#349) in 1933. In 1915, the Passaic Council (#354) was formed, changing its name to the Aheka Council (#354) in 1939. In 1931, the Eagle Rock Council (#346) was formed. In 1942, the Alhtaha Council (#355) was formed. In 1949, the Orange Mountain Council (#337) was formed. In 1921, the North Bergen County Council (#350) was formed. In 1918, the Bayonne Council (#332) was formed.

In 1968, the Hudson and Alexander Hamilton councils merged to become the Hudson-Hamilton Council (#348). In 1993, the Bayonne (#332) and Hudson-Hamilton (#348) councils merged to become the Hudson Liberty Council (#348). In 1969, the North Bergen County Council (#350) changed its name to the Bergen Council (#350) in 1969. The Ridgewood-Glen Rock Council (#359) merged with the Bergen Council (#350) in 1997.

In 1972, the Aheka (#354) and Alhtaha (#355) councils merged to become the Passaic Valley Council (#353). In 1986 Tamarack Council dissolved, splitting into both the Essex (#336) and Bergen (#338) councils. In 1976, the Orange Mountain (#337), Eagle Rock (#346), and Robert Treat (#349) councils merged to become the Essex Council (#336).

On January 1, 1999, the Essex (#336), Hudson Liberty (#338), Bergen (#350), and Passaic Valley councils merged to become the Northern New Jersey Council (#333).

== Organization ==
The council is divided into three districts:

- Three Rivers District— Hudson County, eastern Bergen County
- Ramapo Valley District— Passaic County, western Bergen County
- Lenape Trail District— Essex County

== Camps ==
Northern New Jersey Council currently operates six camps.

=== Camp Alpine ===
Camp Alpine (New Jersey), located in Alpine, New Jersey, is used for weekend camping and hiking the Palisades Historic Trail.

=== Dow Drukker Scout Reservation ===
Dow Drukker Scout Reservation is in Cuddebackville, New York and consists of Camp Turrell and Camp Kluge.

=== Floodwood Mountain Reservation ===
Floodwood Mountain Reservation
- Location: Saranac Lake, NY
- Coordinates: 44.3476°N 74.4423°W
- Founded: 1965
- Website http://www.floodwood.org/

Floodwood Mountain Reservation was established in 1963 and has hosted Scouts for over 55 years. The Rollins Pond Canoe Base and the West Pine Pond Camp form the Reservation, both located in Altamont, NY between Saranac Lake and Tupper Lake, and near many lakes and the High Peaks of the Adirondacks. With rock climbing, waterskiing, archery, and many day hikes and paddles available, Floodwood offers an in-camp programs yet focuses mostly on canoe and backpacking high adventure treks.

History

Floodwood Mountain Reservation was acquired by Bergen Council, BSA on November 22, 1963. Over the next year plans were drawn up for a rather ambitious camping reservation with multiple camps on different parts of the property. As a first step, an outpost camp was established at Rollins Pond for the summer of 1965. Since the concept of wilderness camping offered by a local council camp was a new idea, attendance was by invitation and only units with the required depth of adult leadership were considered.

The initial experience was successful and for the next four summers the program was continued and expanded. Problems with water supply led the Council to explore other areas of the reservation for a permanent camp site.

The initial expansive plan for multiple camps was already being reconsidered, and in the end West Pine Pond was chosen for development. It is at this site that units have camped since the summer of 1970, while they have continued to use Rollins Pond as the launching point for canoe treks and for the water skiing program.

=== Camp Lewis ===
Camp Lewis is located in the Hibernia Section of Rockaway Township, Morris County. It is open for weekend camping throughout the year and is also a Cub Scout Resident Camp during the summer. It is also home to the council COPE course.

History

Camp Lewis was originally donated to the Bayonne Council by the Rosenthal family, who had established Maidenform, when their son, Lewis Rosenthal, drowned while swimming on vacation. It was donated under the agreement that the camp would be named Lewis to memorialize their son, that the camp would teach young boys how to swim and that it would serve kosher meals in the dining hall.

A 2-acre (0.81 ha) lake was constructed Esso's Bayonne employees.

=== Camp No-Be-Bo-Sco ===
Camp No-Be-Bo-Sco
- Location: Blairstown, New Jersey
- Coordinates: 41.06149°N 74.94267°W
- Founded: 1927
- Camp Director: Bob Johnson
- Ranger: Tom Rich
- Website nobebosco.org

Camp No-Be-Bo-Sco, also known as NoBe, is a Boy Scouts of America camp located in Hardwick Township, New Jersey, owned by the Northern New Jersey Council. It opened in 1927.

No-Be-Bo-Sco is in session from July–August each year to Scouts and includes dozens of merit badge classes and activities throughout its 6 weeks. The camp is currently run by Bob Johnson, Camp Director since 1988. Each year at camp has always included a new theme for each summer.

NoBe also operates a year-round program. Heated cabins are available for troops of all sizes to be rented for weekend use. The camp serves as a launching point for a hike along the Appalachian Trail, or exploring the Delaware Watergap Recreation Area.

History

Camp No-Be-Bo-Sco lies on the shores of Sand Pond at the base of the Kittatinny Ridge, approximately 2.5 miles (4.0 km) southeast of the Walpack Bend in Hardwick and Stillwater Townships. Originally, the surrounding Paulins Kill watershed region was inhabited by the Tohockonetcong Band of the Minisink Tribe. It is unlikely they had a permanent settlement in this valley at the headwaters of Jacksonburg Creek due to its inhospitable terrain and shortage of potable water.

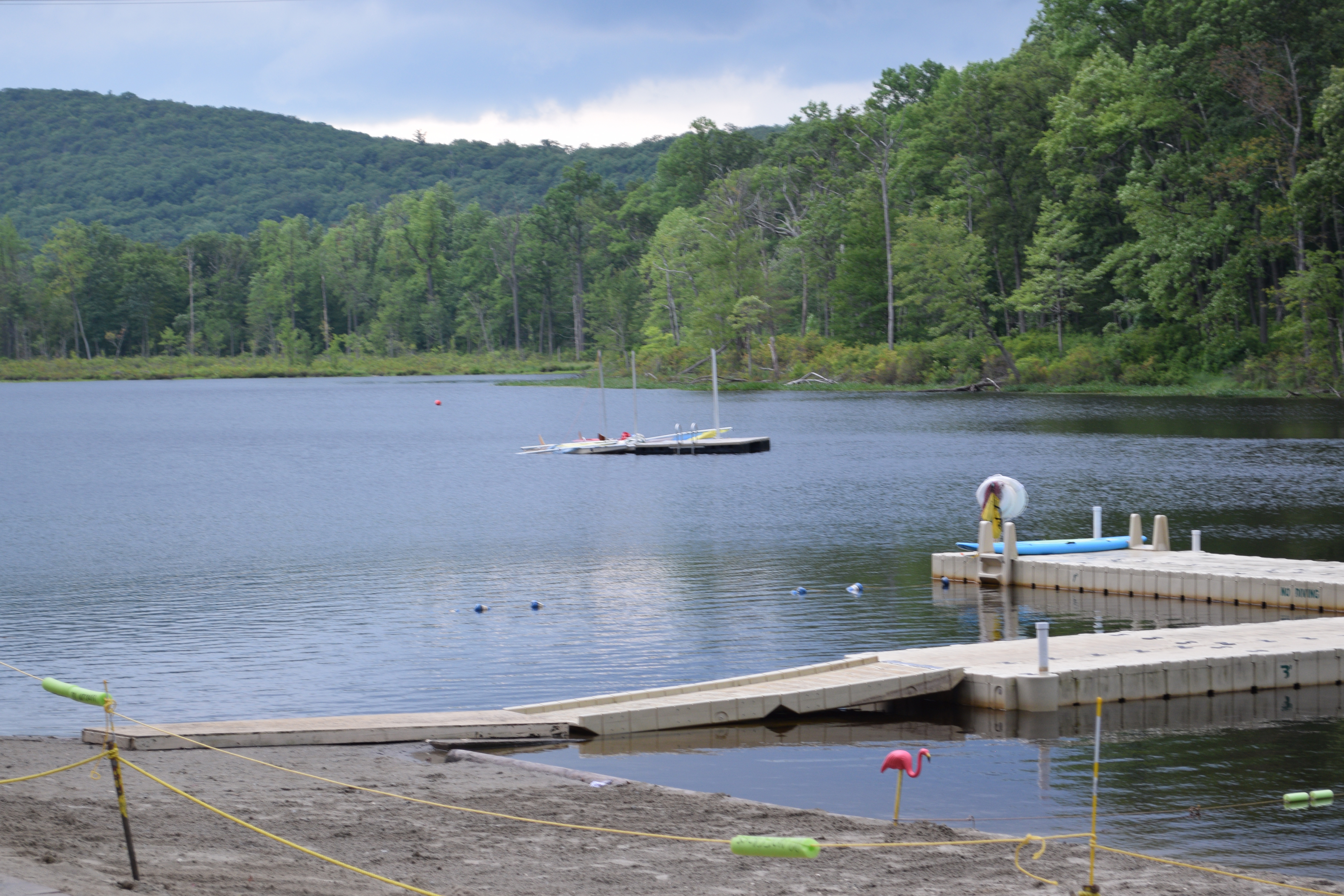
A boat on Sand Pond

Over 500 Boy Scouts attended the first Summer Season in 1927. The first Camp Ranger, Elmer Baker of Maine, was hired in 1928. Lance M. Parsons of Englewood supervised Baker and a crew of men. They built the Camp's log cabins between 1928 and 1931, beginning with a building to house themselves where Price Lodge stands today. In 1930, the Cable Line was built through the camp and over Sand Pond. In 1964, they were connected to a Cable Line in Yards Creek.

Unlike some camps, No-Be-Bo-Sco stayed open during World War II. The war effort made supplies scarce, so Scouts brought their rations to summer camp. The war arrived at camp in a much more tragic way on February 22, 1944, when a B-17F Flying Fortress crashed into the west face of the Kittatiny Ridge.

The Army Corps of Engineers and the National Park Service collaborated during the 1960s on a project to build a proposed national recreation area along the Delaware River that would have been built in conjunction with the controversial Tocks Island Dam project. The Tocks Island dam was proposed to provide water to the region and improve recreation. Many camps along the river were purchased or condemned by the federal government, and in 1970 they bought the mountain from Bergen Council, reducing Camp No-Be-Bo-Sco to approximately 369 acres (1.49 km^{2}). The sale agreement provided Camp access to the proposed lake, but the government abandoned the project due to a large change in public opinion. The resulting Delaware Water Gap National Recreation Area provides Camp direct access to over 69,000 acres (280 km^{2}) of federal parkland.

In 1979, the camp was used as the filming location of the first Friday the 13th, released in 1980. The camp holds events and tours for fans of the film.

In 1988, Bergen Council hired Bob Johnson to direct Summer Camp. Although Bob had never been to No-Be-Bo-Sco, he had sixteen years of camp staff experience, and quickly revitalized the program. Among other things, Bob has created the Camp’s first centralized staff area, supervised outfitting the Dining Hall with a better kitchen, and crafted a summer camp program unique to No-Be-Bo-Sco. His non-stop, high energy program is well-known for its enthusiastic staff, high quality food, and original campfires. Bob Johnson still serves as Camp Director and 2007 was his twentieth summer at the post. He is the longest tenured Camp Director in No-Be-Bo-Sco history.

While Bob Johnson attracted new units, in 1990 a group of Overpeck District volunteers led by Jim Africano started the Weboree. The increased summer and winter attendance bolstered Camp’s finances, and the Weboree helped restore Scouter enthusiasm. Soon No-Be-Bo-Sco was being used year round once again.

The camps current ranger, Tom Rich, was permanently assigned to No-Be-Bo-Sco in 1995. The same year, volunteers led by a Scout, Steve Kallesser, undertook a major dining hall renovation. Two years later the same group converted the Protestant Chapel to an all-faiths facility and built an outdoor chapel; the first new camp structure in almost 30 years.

Shortly after, the Northern New Jersey Council began a camp improvement campaign between 2008 and 2010 that involved the renovation of a majority of camp cabins and facilities.

=== Camp Yaw-Paw ===
Camp Yaw Paw Camp Yaw-Paw is a 400-acre (1.6 km^{2}) tract of land in the Ramapo Mountain Range. The camp offers a winter camping program from September till May. Camp Yaw-Paw is NNJ Council's Cub Day Camp during the summer months.

=== Camp Glen Gray ===
Camp Glen Gray was located near Mahwah, New Jersey in the Ramapo Mountains in Bergen County, New Jersey. Founded in 1917 by Frank Gray for the Montclair Council, the 150 acres (61 ha) camp is named after Frank Gray, a well known early professional Scouter of that area. The camp is now a Bergen County Park and is independently managed and financially supported by The Friends of Glen Gray, Inc.

== Order of the Arrow ==
Northern New Jersey Council's Order of the Arrow lodge is the Lenaphoking Lodge.

Lenapehoking Lodge was formed from the merger of Mantowagan Lodge #14, Meechgalanne Lodge #178, Oratam Lodge #286, and Aquaninoncke Lodge #359.

Lenapehoking Lodge traces its origins to the earliest days of the Order of the Arrow. Pamrapaugh Lodge #14, founded in 1921, in the (then) Bayonne Council was the tenth lodge formed in the Order of the Arrow and was present at the first grand lodge meeting, held in Philadelphia in 1921. Due to a clerical error, Pamrapaugh was assigned #14, although it is known to be the tenth lodge formed. Pamrapaugh would eventually merge with Elauwit Lodge #37 to form Mantowagan Lodge #14, encompassing all of Hudson County, NJ. Elauwit Lodge #37 traces its founding to (then) Scout Executive (of the Jersey City Council) Carroll A. Edson, co-founder of the Order of the Arrow. Edson would be recognized with the aVigil Honor in Achtu Lodge #37.

Former Lodge Chief Benjamin La is now the secretary for Section E17; after a section election at Forestburg Scout Reservation during the 2026 Section Conclave.

== See also ==
- Scouting in New Jersey
