= Zillow Gone Wild =

2024 television series

- Genre: Reality television
- Presented by: Jack McBrayer
- Country of origin: United States
- Original language: English
- No. of seasons: 3
- No. of episodes: 23

Production
- Running time: 22 minutes
- Production company: Asylum Entertainment Group

Original release
- Network: HGTV
- Release: May 3, 2024 – present

Zillow Gone Wild is an American reality television series on HGTV. The series is based on the viral internet meme of the same name, popularized on Instagram and TikTok, and is hosted by Jack McBrayer.

== Premise ==
The show follows Jack McBrayer as he tours non-traditional homes with their distinctive décor and imaginative architecture, as well as reveals the inventive ways to market a distinctive property.

== Episodes ==
=== Season 1 (2024) ===
No. overall	No. in season	Title	Original release date	US viewers (millions)
1	1	"Time to Get Wild"	May 3, 2024	N/A
In pursuit of finding the wildest homes around, Jack’s first stop is Nebraska, where he explores a newly renovated missile silo.
2	2	"No Wild Stone Unturned"	May 10, 2024	N/A
Jack heads out to Palm Springs, California, where he tours the former home of Hollywood royalty.
3	3	"Take Me Over the Rainbow"	May 17, 2024	N/A
Jack makes three more stops, this time in St. Louis, MO; Joshua Tree, CA; and Santa Barbara, CA
4	4	"Horns, Domes and Turrets"	May 24, 2024	N/A
Jack starts in St. Louis where a Catholic church has undergone a conversion.
5	5	"Wild Ho"	May 31, 2024	N/A
Jack travels to Nevada where a home is filled with pirate treasure.
6	6	"Wild, Ho"	May 31, 2024	N/A
Jack visits a California home atop a mountain.
7	7	"What Wild Lies Inside"	June 7, 2024	N/A
Jack returns to Santa Barbara, California, for a home influenced by marine biology.
8	8	"Then There Were Eight"	June 21, 2024	N/A
Jack arrives in Lake Las Vegas for an estate there.
9	9	"Crowning the Wildest"	June 28, 2024	N/A
One home is declared the champion.

=== Season 2 (2025) ===
No. overall	No. in season	Title	Original release date	US viewers (millions)
10	1	"Stay for A-Wild"	July 18, 2025	N/A
Jack begins the season with a shoe-shaped home in Pennsylvania.
11	2	"Where the Trolls Live"	July 25, 2025	N/A
Jack looks at three places including a very full one.
12	3	"The Good, the Bad, the Wild"	August 1, 2025	N/A
Jack tours a Wild West home.
13	4	"We Need to Steal a Chair"	August 8, 2025	N/A
Jack visits a highly adorned France-inspired home.
14	5	"Fit for a King and Queen"	August 15, 2025	N/A
Jack visits a castle, a former church, and a ranch.
15	6	"Halo Effect"	August 22, 2025	N/A
Jack visits a colorful high-rise and a retreat.
16	7	"Secret Stash"	August 29, 2025	N/A
Jack explores a former mobster's hangout.

=== Season 3 (2026) ===
No. overall	No. in season	Title	Original release date	US viewers (millions)
17	1	"Back to the Wild"	May 1, 2026	N/A
A 727 airplane converted to a home and a pink penthouse frozen in time.
18	2	"The Bold and the Bunker"	May 8, 2026	N/A
Jack sees the ruins of a desert ghost town, a concrete castle in the mountains, and a home that's mostly black and white.
19	3	"Ranch Dressing"	May 15, 2026	N/A
A cozy train caboose hideaway, a pastel-painted whimsical ranch and a charming desert dream oasis.
20	4	"Florida, Man"	May 22, 2026	N/A
Jack tours a marine-themed home and a pilot-inspired estate in Florida.
21	5	"tbd"	June 6, 2026	N/A
?
22	6	"tbd"	July 7, 2026	N/A
?
23	7	"tbd"	August 8, 2026	N/A
?
