= Scouting in New Jersey =

Scouting in New Jersey has a long history, from the 1910s to the present day, serving thousands of youth in programs that suit the environment in which they live. The second Boy Scouts of America National Headquarters was in North Brunswick, although it was referred to in BSA publications as being in neighboring New Brunswick.

== Early history (1910–1950) ==
In 1915, the Ridgewood Council (#359) was formed, changing its name to the Ridgewood-Glen Rock Council (#359) in 1922. In 1919, the Englewood Council (#339) was formed, changing its name to the Englewood Council (#350) in 1922. In 1915, the Paterson Council (#355) was formed, changing its name to the Paterson Area Council (#355) in 1927. The council changed it name again in 1942 to the Alhtaha Council (#355).

In 1917, the Bloomfield Council (#333) and Nutley Council (#352) were formed. They merged to for the Bloomfield-Nutley Council (#333) in 1929. In 1935, Bloomfield-Nutley changed its name to Tamarack Council (#333). In 1915, the South Bergen County Council (#360) was formed, merging into the Tamarack Council (#333) in 1935.

In 1913, the Montclair Council (#346) was formed. In 1918, the Caldwell Council (#334) was formed. In 1915, the Glen Ridge Council (#821) was formed. In 1931, the Montclair, Caldwell, and Glen Ridge councils merged to become the Eagle Rock Council (#346) in 1931.

In 1915, the East Orange Council (#337) was formed. In 1917, the Orange (#353) and West Orange (#363) councils were formed. In 1917, the South Orange Council (#345) was formed, changing its name to the Orange Mountain Council (#345) in 1919. In 1933, the East Orange, Orange, West Orange, and Orange Mountain councils merged to form the Oranges and Maplewood Area Council (#337). Oranges and Maplewood Area Council changed its name to Orange Mountain (#337) in 1949.

In 1919, the North Hudson Council (#351) was formed, changing its name to the Alexander Hamilton Council (#351) in 1937. In 1921, the Hoboken Council (#341) was formed. In 1918, the Jersey City Council (#342) was formed. In 1936, the Hoboken and Jersey City councils merged to become the Hudson Council (342).

In 1915, the Newark Council (#349) was formed, changing its name to the Robert Treat Council (#349) in 1933. In 1915, the Passaic Council (#354) was formed, changing its name to the Aheka Council (#354) in 1939. In 1931, the Eagle Rock Council (#346) was formed. In 1942, the Alhtaha Council (#355) was formed. In 1949, the Orange Mountain Council (#337) was formed. In 1921, the North Bergen County Council (#350) was formed. In 1918, the Bayonne Council (#332) was formed.

South Jersey

Cumberland County Council (#336) existed from 1919 to 1944 became [a part of] South Jersey Council (#336) which formed in 1944. South Jersey Council (#336) merged with Gloucester-Salem (#678) in 1967.

Lenape Area Council #339 (1929-1932) eventually became [a part of] Atlantic Area Council (#331).

Atlantic City Council (#331) from 1918 to 1926. Atlantic Area Council (#331) formed in 1926 and Ocean County Council (#341) formed in 1940, merged in 1992 creating Jersey Shore Council#341.

Burlington Council formed in 1919 and changed its name to Burlington County Council (#690) in 1925. After a merger with Southern New Jersey Council (#334), Garden State Council (#690) was formed in 2013.

Camden Council (#335) formed in 1915 and changed its name to Camden County Council in 1921. It existed until 1998 when it became part of Southern New Jersey Council (#334).

Gloucester-Salem Council (#678) formed in 1924 and South Jersey Council (#336) formed in 1944, merged in 1967 to become Southern New Jersey Council (#334).

Southern New Jersey Council (#334) and Burlington County Council (#690) merged to form Garden State Council (#690) in 2013.

Camp Glen Gray, located in Bergen County, New Jersey (Northern New Jersey Council) has been continually active since 1917, and was originally 150 acres (0.61 km^{2}) located in a valley in the Ramapo Mountains in New Jersey. Camp Glen Gray is named after Frank Fellows Gray, (1869–1935) a well known early professional Scouter of that area. It was selected and developed by Gray to give a permanent summer camp for Scouts, and the camp is the first purpose-built Scout camp in New Jersey. Prior Scout summer camping experiments were typically temporary affairs at farm fields or church camps. Frank Gray was one of America's earliest Scoutmasters, having started Troop 4 in Montclair, New Jersey, known as the "Lord Baden-Powell Troop" in March 1909. He also created an honor program that was used in New Jersey and in the Brooklyn Council called "Senior Division". The camp ultimately reached a size of about 840 acres (3.4 km^{2}) and was operated by Eagle Rock Council, then Essex Council, and finally Northern New Jersey Council. In 2003, the camp was sold to the Bergen County Parks Commission and operated through a management agreement by the non-profit group Friends of Glen Gray, and is supported by a group of volunteers known as the "Old Guard". While no longer an "official" Boy Scout Camp, it does continue to host a large number of Scouting groups and activities throughout the year, as well as hosting a summer day camp for an area special-needs school.

Notable Scout Walter Marty Schirra, Jr. (March 12, 1923 – May 3, 2007) earned the rank of First Class in Troop 36 in Oradell, New Jersey. He was one of the original Mercury 7 astronauts. He was also the only person to fly in all of America's first three space programs (Mercury, Gemini and Apollo).

Cub Scouting Origins – To begin including younger boys to Scouting, James E. West approved the formation of the Boy Rangers of America, a separate organization for boys eight through twelve based on an American Indian theme. The Boy Rangers used the Scout Law and Chief Guide Emerson Brooks was a Boy Scout commissioner in Montclair, New Jersey. The BSA finally began some experimental Cubbing units in 1928 and in 1930 the BSA began registering the first Cubbing packs, and the Boy Rangers were absorbed. The Cub Scouting program used elements of Rudyard Kipling's Jungle Book series, with the Cubmaster taking the role of Akela and the assistant Cubmaster the role of Baloo. The American program also syncretized American Indian elements, with all Cub Scouts belonging to the Webelos tribe, symbolized by the Arrow of Light and led by Akela. Webelos was also an acronym meaning Wolf, Bear, Lion, Scout. The initial rank structure was Wolf, Bear and Lion, with ages of 9, 10 and 11. Dens of six to eight Cubs were entirely led by a Boy Scout holding the position of den chief.

Mortimer L. Schiff – After a long tenure as vice-president of the BSA beginning in 1910, during which he also appeared on the cover of Time magazine on February 14, 1927, Mortimer L. Schiff was elected as president in 1931, but died after serving one month and Walter Head returned until 1946. Schiff's mother purchased and donated 400 acres (1.6 km^{2}) of land in New Jersey and donated it to the BSA, thus creating Mortimer L. Schiff Scout Reservation as a national training center. Both Mortimer and his son, John M. Schiff, received the Silver Buffalo Award from the BSA.

William "Green Bar Bill" Hillcourt – William Hillcourt was one of the BSA's most prolific writers. He wrote numerous articles for Boys' Life and Scouting magazines, including a column aimed at patrol leaders under the by-line of "Patrol Leader Green Bar Bill". At least 12,610,000 copies of his three editions of the Boy Scout Handbook were printed. Hillcourt died in Europe while on a Scouting tour in 1992. He is buried with his wife Grace in St. Joseph's Cemetery in Mendham, New Jersey at Row 8, Block I, to be near Mortimer L. Schiff Scout Reservation as he had lived for so many years. His legacy in Scouting and his influence continue in the programs and training of Scouting. Consequently, his writings are still used within the Scouting movement and his material continues to be reprinted in Scouting magazine.[21] The Hiawatha Seaway Council operates the William Hillcourt Scout Museum at Camp Woodland in New York to "keep the traditions of Scouting alive" through the preservation of the history that is a foundation for today's Scouting movement

Order of the Arrow – The first Order of the Arrow ceremony for the Vigil Honor was held in New Jersey by E. Urner Goodman using Scouts from the Treasure Island Scout Reservation. The 1925 and 1936 National Order of the Arrow Lodge Meetings were held at Treasure Island, New Jersey.

== Recent history (1950–2010) ==
In 1954, the National Council of the Boy Scouts of America moved its National Headquarters from New York City to a new site at the southwest corner of U.S. Route 1 and U.S. Route 130 in North Brunswick, New Jersey, although the location appeared in BSA publications as "New Brunswick". The Johnston Historical Museum and a conservation education trail were also located there. The national headquarters moved to Irving, Texas in 1979.

In 1968, the Hudson and Alexander Hamilton councils merged to become the Hudson-Hamilton Council (#348). In 1993, the Bayonne (#332) and Hudson-Hamilton (#348) councils merged to become the Hudson Liberty Council (#348). In 1969, the North Bergen County Council (#350) changed its name to the Bergen Council (#350) in 1969. The Ridgewood-Glen Rock Council (#359) merged with the Bergen Council (#350) in 1997.

In 1972, the Aheka (#354) and Alhtaha (#355) councils merged to become the Passaic Valley Council (#353). In 1986 Tamarack Council dissolved, splitting into both the Essex (#336) and Bergen (#338) councils. In 1976, the Orange Mountain (#337), Eagle Rock (#346), and Robert Treat (#349) councils merged to become the Essex Council (#336).

On January 1, 1999, the Essex (#336), Hudson Liberty (#338), Bergen (#350), and Passaic Valley councils merged to become the Northern New Jersey Council (#333).

== Scouting America ==
There are seven Scouting America (BSA) local councils active in New Jersey.

=== Washington Crossing Council ===
The Washington Crossing Council serves scouts in Bucks County, Pennsylvania and scouts in two districts located in Western New Jersey that were transferred from the former Central New Jersey Council: The Mercer Area District in Mercer County, New Jersey and the Hunterdon Arrowhead District in Hunterdon County, New Jersey.

=== Garden State Council ===
Garden State Council (#690)
- Owner: Boy Scouts of America
- Headquarters: Westampton, NJ
- Founded: 2013
- Website www.gardenstatescouting.org

The Garden State Council serves all Scouting units in the following counties: Burlington, Camden, Cape May, Cumberland, Gloucester, and Salem. The council also serves Buena Vista Township and Buena Borough in Atlantic County.

Southern New Jersey Council and Burlington County Council (formed in 1925) merged to form this new council as of January 1, 2013.

==== Camps ====
- Roosevelt Scout Reservation (Scouts BSA camp)
- Camp Diller (Scouts BSA tent camp)
- Camp Grice (Cub Scout camp and used for Introduction to Outdoor Leader Skills (IOLS))
- Pine Hill Scout Reservation (Cub Scout camp)
- Pine Tree Education and Environmental Center (Cub Scout Camp)

==== Order of the Arrow Lodge ====
Lenape Lodge #8, a merger of Te'kening 37 (founded in 1999) and Hunnikick 76 (founded in 1935)

=== Jersey Shore Council ===
The Jersey Shore Council serves all of Ocean and Atlantic Counties, and parts of Burlington County.

=== Minsi Trails Council ===
The Minsi Trails Council serves Scouts of eastern Pennsylvania's Lehigh Valley, the Pocono Mountains, and Warren County, New Jersey.

=== Monmouth Council ===
Monmouth Council, BSA, established in 1917, serves all of Monmouth County, New Jersey and part of Middlesex County, New Jersey. The council operates two camps:

- Forestburg Scout Reservation in Forestburgh, NY
- Quail Hill Scout Reservation in Manalapan, NJ

=== Northern New Jersey Council ===
The Northern New Jersey Council serves Scouting in Bergen, Essex, Hudson and Passaic counties. The council is divided into three districts: Three Rivers (eastern Bergen County and Hudson County areas), Ramapo Valley (western Bergen and Passaic County areas), and Lenape Trail (Essex County towns). In 2013, this council served over 13,000 youths. As of 2025, the council currently operates three camps: - NoBeBoSco, in Blairstown - Camp Yaw Paw, in Mahwah - Floodwood Mountain Reservation, in Saranac Lake In addition, as of 2023, the council had operated two more camps which unfortunately closed. - Camp Lewis, in Rockaway Township - Camp Turrell, in Cuddlebackville

=== Patriots' Path Council ===
The Patriots' Path Council includes Morris, Sussex, Somerset, Middlesex, and Union counties.

== Girl Scouts of the USA ==
Map of Girl Scout Councils in New Jersey

New Jersey is divided into four councils that were created after the realignment of the previous eleven councils in 2007.

=== Girl Scouts of Central and Southern New Jersey ===
Girl Scouts of Central and Southern New Jersey
- Owner: GSUSA
- Headquarters: Cherry Hill
- Country: United States
- Chief Executive Officer: Ginny Hill
- Website gsnj.org

The Girl Scouts of Central and Southern NJ covers a bit more than nine counties: (Atlantic, Burlington, Camden, Cape May, Cumberland, Gloucester, Mercer, Middlesex, Salem, and parts of Monmouth) and serves over 27,000 girls and 11,000 adults. The council includes 3 service centers, 6 camps and 2 mobile resource centers. It was formed by the merger of Camden, Delaware-Raritan, and South Jersey Pines Councils on October 1, 2007. Planned merger date was July 1, 2007, but due to Delaware-Raritan's changed vote, the councils merged on October 1, 2007.

They are headquartered in Cherry Hill. Their CEO is Ginny Hill.

==== Camps ====
- Camp Inawendiwin offers both day and overnight camp options. It is located in Tabernacle (Burlington County). Campers sleep in cabins or platform tents. Activities include archery, geocaching, ziplining, canoeing, bouldering, and tractor rides. It is currently directed by Jae "Mayday" Oliastro.
- Camp Kettle Run is primarily used for troop and family camping. It is located in Medford (Burlington County). Campers sleep in cabins or platform tents. Activities include archery, canoeing, ziplining, and the HerStory center; a museum of Girl Scout history. It is currently directed by Christina "Donuts" Makofka.
- Camp Oak Spring is a day camp in Somerset (Somerset County). Cabins, tents, and yurts are available for troops to rent. Activities include archery, rock climbing, ziplining, canoeing, and tractor rides. It is currently directed by Amanda "Manny" Kelly.
- Camp Sacajawea, also known as Sacy, is a day camp in Newfield (Gloucester County). Cabins and tents are available for troops to rent. Activities include archery, rock climbing, geocaching, a low ropes course and a nature center. It is currently directed by Christina "Donuts" Makofka.

==== Past Camps ====
- Camp Sheppard's Mill was a camp in Greenwich (Cumberland County). In 2017, it was purchased by the state of New Jersey and was added to the Cohansey River Wildlife Management Area.

==== Other Properties ====
- Cherry Hill council headquarters and shop - 40 Brace Road, Cherry Hill, NJ 08093
- Hamilton Girl Experience Center - 2450 Kuser Road, Hamilton, NJ 08690
- Egg Harbor Township Girl Experience Center - 3003 English Creek Ave, Egg Harbor Township, NJ 08234
- North Brunswick DreamLab - 527 Shoppes Boulevard, North Brunswick Township, NJ 08902

=== Girl Scouts Heart of New Jersey ===
Girl Scouts Heart of New Jersey serves 17,000 plus girls in Hudson, Essex, Union, Somerset, Hunterdon, Southern Warren and parts of Middlesex counties. It was formed by the merger of Great Essex and Hudson Counties, Rolling Hills, and Washington Rock councils.

Headquarters: Westfield, NJ

Service Centers:

- East - 120 Valley Road, Montclair, NJ 07042
- West - 1171 Route 28, North Branch, NJ 08876
- Central - 201 Grove Street East, Westfield, NJ 07090

Camps:

- Camp Lou Henry Hoover - 340 acres (140 ha) in Middleville part of Stillwater Township, New Jersey in Sussex County. It was opened in 1953.
- Camp Agnes DeWitt Day Camp – 152 acres (62 ha) in Hillsborough, NJ
- The OVAL in the South Mountain Reservation in Maplewood, NJ

=== Girl Scouts of the Jersey Shore ===
Girl Scouts of the Jersey Shore serves some 16,000 girls and has 6,000 adult volunteers in Ocean and most of Monmouth counties. Created in July 2007 by the merger of Monmouth and Ocean County Councils.

Headquarters: Farmingdale, New Jersey

Service Centers:

- Toms River, NJ - Ocean Service Center, 1405 Old Freehold Road, Toms River, NJ 08753
- Farmingdale, NJ - Monmouth Service Center, 242 Adelphia Road, Farmingdale, NJ 07727

Camps:

- Camp Sacajawea is 143 acres (58 ha) in Farmingdale, NJ
- Camp Amity Acres is 57 acres (23 ha) of pine barrens in Waretown, NJ

=== Girl Scouts of Northern New Jersey ===
Girl Scouts of Northern New Jersey serves 20.5% of girls aged 5–17 in 160 municipalities including all of Bergen, Morris, Passaic, and Sussex counties and the northern half of Warren County. As of 2011 there were 33,795 girl members and 17,395 adult members. It was formed on October 1, 2007, by the merger of Bergen, Leni-Lenape, and Morris Area Girl Scout Councils.

Headquarters: Riverdale, NJ

Service Centers:

- Paramus, NJ - 300 Forest Avenue, Paramus, NJ 07652
- Randolph, NJ - 1579 Sussex Turnpike, Randolph, NJ 07869
- Riverdale, NJ - (closed for renovations until late 2011)

Resource Center:

- Paterson, NJ - Center City Mall, 301 Main Street, Upper Level, Paterson, N.J. 07505

Camps:

- Camp Glen Spey - 600 acres (240 ha) in Glen Spey, NY. It includes a 70 acres (28 ha) glacial lake.
- Lake Rickabear – 332 acres (134 ha) in Kinnelon, New Jersey
- Jockey Hollow Camp – 212 acres (86 ha) in Mendham, New Jersey

Camp Mogisca was sold in 2010.

=== Discontinued/Legacy Girl Scout Councils ===
The following New Jersey councils existed prior to mergers in the 1990s and 2000s:

- Bergen Girl Scout Council - Became part of the new Girl Scouts of Northern New Jersey in 2007
- Burlington County Council - Became part of Girl Scouts of the South Jersey Pines in 1996
- Camden County Council - Became part of the new Girl Scouts of Central & Southern New Jersey in 2007
- Delaware-Raritan Council - Became part of the new Girl Scouts of Central & Southern New Jersey in 2007
- Great Essex and Hudson Counties Council - Became part of the new Girl Scouts Heart of New Jersey in 2008
- Holly Shores Council - Became part of Girl Scouts of the South Jersey Pines in 1996
- Leni-Lenape Girl Scout Council - Became part of the new Girl Scouts of Northern New Jersey in 2007
- Monmouth Girl Scout Council - Became part of the new Girl Scouts of the Jersey Shore in 2007
- Morris Area Girl Scout Council - Became part of the new Girl Scouts of Northern New Jersey in 2007
- Ocean County Girl Scout Council - Became part of the new Girl Scouts of the Jersey Shore in 2007
- Rolling Hills Council - Became part of the new Girl Scouts Heart of New Jersey in 2008
- South Jersey Pines Council - Became part of the new Girl Scouts of Central & Southern New Jersey in 2007
- Washington Rock Council - Became part of the new Girl Scouts Heart of New Jersey in 2008

== International Scouting units in New Jersey ==
Külföldi Magyar Cserkészszövetség Hungarian Scouting maintains two troops each in Passaic, New Jersey and New Brunswick, New Jersey.

== Scouting Museums in New Jersey ==
The New Jersey Scout Museum in Morganville was established as an independent non-profit in 2004 and concentrates on history of Scouting in New Jersey.

The Northeast Region Scout Museum in Rochelle Park sits on top of Rochelle Park Troop 114’s building, on the property of the Rochelle Park American Legion Post 170.
