= Frank Fellows Gray =

American pioneer of scouting (1863–1935)

Frank Fellows Gray, "Uncle"
- Born: December 31, 1863; Syracuse, New York, United States
- Died: March 8, 1935 (aged 71)
- Resting place: Mount Hebron Cemetery, Upper Montclair, New Jersey
- Occupations: Scout Commissioner, teacher
- Known for: Boy Scouts of America Founding first Troop and Camp Glen Gray
- Awards: Senior Degree Honor Society, Boy Scouts of America 1935 S/D Convocation BSA

Frank Fellows Gray (December 31, 1863 – March 8, 1935), also known as Uncle, was a pioneer of Scouting in America, teacher and musician. He was a personal friend of Robert Baden-Powell, 1st Baron Baden-Powell founder of the Scout Movement who on a visit to Montclair, New Jersey on February 2, 1912 bestowed the singular honor of "The Baden-Powell Troop" on Frank's Boy Scout Troop 4.

== Background ==
After having been educated at Syracuse University, where he was a member of the Phi Delta Theta fraternity, Frank was a teacher at Military Academies in Long Island, New York. While visiting Scottish relatives in 1907 he visited B-P at the first Scout training camp at Brownsea Island Scout camp and returned in 1908 as a participant. He is believed to have started the first Scout Troop in Glasgow, Scotland in 1908. Frank was the founder of one of the first Boy Scout Troops in the United States based on the Baden-Powell system of Scouting, Montclair, New Jersey, March 9, 1909 later to become Troop 4. Ernest Thompson Seton, Chief Scout, visited Montclair to address the Scouts, December 9, 1910. Frank is believed to have organized the first real Boy Scout Camp in the United States on Dudley Island, Sussex County, New Jersey Summer 1911. Frank is one of the organizers of the Girl Scout Movement in the Montclair area, 1912–1913. He also founded, in 1914, the ‘Old Guard’, an honor society for preservation of ‘scout camping’. Frank awarded Montclair’s first Eagle Scout Award to Howard Utter, Autumn of 1915. After running Boy Scout Summer camps at various locations between 1913 and 1916 he was founder and namesake of Camp Glen Gray, Ramapo Mountains in Bergen County, New Jersey May 1917.

Frank helped to organize many World War I relief efforts (War Loans, Thrift Stamp, raising over two million dollars), including the Emergency Coast Guard, April 15, 1917. He continued his active involvement and support of Scouting in the Montclair area until health issues intervened. He last visited Glen Gray in 1930. He was a piccolo musician, author, songwriter, poet, and organizer who taught the youth using Baden Powell’s principles of Scouting.

== Poem ==
An Invitation

Come, sit a while with me
Up in the old cabin shade,
If the day is hot,
There’s a cool verandah,
And if there’s a chill,
There’s a wood fire on the hearth,
And there’s a book to read
Or chance to write a letter home.
So come sit a while with me
And talk about the old times and new
In the cabin by the lake.

"Uncle" 1935
