= New Birth of Freedom Council =

Council of the Boy Scouts of America

New Birth of Freedom Council #544
- Owner: Boy Scouts of America
- Headquarters: Mechanicsburg, Pennsylvania
- Country: United States
- Founded: April 1, 2010
- Scout Executive: Ron Gardner
- Website newbirthoffreedom.org

The New Birth of Freedom Council is a council of the Boy Scouts of America serving South-Central Pennsylvania. The council was formed by a merger of York-Adams Area Council and Keystone Area Council on April 1, 2010.

== Districts ==
The Council is divided into the following Districts:

- Battlefield District: Adams county and Hanover. The name Battlefield reflects the Battle of Hanover and the Battle of Gettysburg, both fought during the American Civil War.
- Conococheague District: Franklin and Perry Counties. The name refers to a creek in Franklin County, Pennsylvania, and a mountain of the same name in Perry County, Pennsylvania. The mountain is a significant portion of the Tuscarora State Forest, and the creek is a tributary of the Potomac River. The word Conococheague is translated from the Delaware Indian spoken language to mean water of many turns. The area along the creek was home to the first settlement in the area which was referred to as the Conococheague Region and eventually developed into present-day Chambersburg.
- Heritage Trails District: York County. Originally used by the Susquehannock, the Susquehanna Trail began common use in the colonial period as a major travel route from York to Harrisburg.
- Keystone Capital District: Dauphin County. This district includes the Pennsylvania state capital city, and the name references the state nickname of the Keystone State. Pennsylvania was called this because of its central location, and also due to its commercial and political importance among the 13 colonies.
- Pioneer District: Cumberland County. The name reflects both the first pioneers to cross over the mountains to western Pennsylvania who started their journeys from this area and the name of one of the first steam locomotives running on the Cumberland Valley Railroad beginning in the 1850s.

== Council Camps ==
The New Birth of Freedom Council owns four council camps, Camp Conewago, Camp Tuckahoe, Hidden Valley Scout Reservation, and Wizard Ranch.

=== Camp Conewago ===
Camp Conewago is located in New Oxford, PA at the “Forks” where the Little Conewago enters into the Big Conewago stream. It was formerly at the point of a traders cabin where the collection of furs and trading was done with early settlers and the Conewago Indian Tribes in the area.

In 1919, the officers of Conewago Council, which then oversaw Scouting in Hanover, Littlestown, New Oxford, Locust Grove, Abbottstown, and East Berlin, saw the need for a Boy Scout camp in their area. Along with the assistance of other civic-minded citizens, the council solicited funds in the area for a camp. On September 13, 1919, they purchased approximately 25 acres of land in Hamilton Township, Adams County, from George T. Gitt. Today, Camp Conewago is still blessed with many of the original buildings constructed over the years.

=== Camp Tuckahoe ===
Camp Tuckahoe is the largest of four camps owned by the New Birth of Freedom Council, and is currently operated for use by both Boy Scouts and Cub Scouts. The 1,300-acre (5.3 km^{2}) site is located in York County, Pennsylvania, a few miles west of Dillsburg.

The site was formerly a hunting camp which the Council purchased on March 21, 1947, to replace Camp Canoga. Construction on the property started in the spring of 1947, and the first camping season got underway the next year on June 27, 1948. Many of the later facilities where not present that first season, including the lake, troops cabins (the boys all slept in tents or lean-tos), and the memorial chapel.

From the purchase of the land until part way through the first season, the camp was referred to as "South Mountain Camp" and also "South Mountain Memorial Scout Camp" (as a tribute to WWII servicemen). During the initial camp season, a contest was held to choose between the names "South Mountain", "Tuckahoe", and "Whippoorwill", and Tuckahoe won out. The name Tuckahoe is attributed to mean "Land of the Deer and the Fawn" in a Native American language.

The Memorial Mall and adjoining Chapels are the centerpiece of Camp Tuckahoe. The Mall is an open area lined by hemlock trees that is often used for camp ceremonies and quiet activities. Each of the hemlock trees has been dedicated to a member of the "Council Eternal" (a Scout or Scouter who has died). Additional dedications are made annually when new names are added to the Memorial Wall. Another feature of the Mall is a reflection area where Scouts can read a bronze plaque bearing the words of Rudyard Kiplings's poem If— The recently renovated indoor chapel at the top of the mall was dedicated in memory of Rabbi Goode, one of the Four Chaplains from the troop transport Dorchester.

An area of Camp Tuckahoe called "Cub World" is a special place within the camp that has programs and facilities specifically designed for boys ages 6–10.

Themed areas include the Pirate Ship, Medieval Castle, Frontier Fort, and the TeePee Village. Sleeping arrangements are available in all four areas. Other more general use areas include the Nature Tree House, the Underground Mine, Physical Fitness trail, Cub Activity Field, and Cub Pavilion. Additionally there are Air Rifles, Action Archery (a sling shot course), and Archery Ranges, which tend to be heavily used during summer camp sessions.

Each year, during the designated Cub Scout weeks, the activities in camp are based on a theme. During the week there are many activities centered around the theme of the year. These themes rotate on a 4-year cycle between Safari, Wild West, Knights of the Round Table, and Pirates of Camp Tuckahoe. However, there has been a deviation from the cycle over the past few years. 2025's theme was Space, with the theme for Summer 2026 to be announced soon.

- Safari (2002, 2006, 2010, 2014, 2018, 2022)
- Wild West (2003, 2007, 2011, 2015, 2019, 2023)
- Knights of the Round Table (2004, 2008, 2012, 2016, 2024) 2020 was skipped due to the COVID-19 Global Pandemic
- Pirates of Camp Tuckahoe (2005, 2009, 2013, 2017, 2021)
  - Space (2025)
  - TBD (2026).

=== Hidden Valley Scout Reservation ===
Situated on 830+ acres near Loysville, PA in Perry County, with Sherman’s Creek and its fishing opportunities running through it, Hidden Valley has been in operation since 1927. It is one of the camps operated by the New Birth of Freedom Council.

As of 2025 Hidden Valley no longer offers Summer Camp programming.

For Scouting units and non-scout groups looking for year-round outdoor opportunities Hidden Valley also offers a wide variety of cabins with capacities ranging from 10 to 65 people.

=== Wizard Ranch ===
Carefully preserved as a primitive camping area, Wizard Ranch is 300 acres of fields and woodlands in eastern York County (Hellam Township) near the western banks of the Susquehanna River and is available for year-round short-term camping or day use.

The Wizard Ranch was donated to the council in 1960 by Mahlon N. Haines, owner of the Haines Shoe Company. Haines was an ardent supporter of the Scouting movement and in 1941, Haines conceived the idea of hosting on his farm in Hellam Township a special gathering of Scouts from all parts of the Council to celebrate his birthday. This event became the first “Haines Safari” and it was such a success that Haines Safaris were repeated in 1945, 1950, 1955 and 1960, each one striving to be bigger and better than its predecessor. 1960 would be the last of the true Haines Safaris because Haines died very shortly thereafter. Just before his death, Haines gave the land to the York-Adams Area Council. Although Haines intended that his land would thereafter be known as something like the “Colonel Mahlon N. Haines Memorial Scout Reservation, it, however, has always been called by generations of Scouts who have come to know and appreciate it, as simply “Wizard Ranch.” In a letter to the Council dated simply “October 1960,” bearing in the stationery logo the message “Wizard Ranch – the Yellowstone Park of the East,” Haines noted “I hope to live long enough to see this one of the great Scout reservations in America, which will add much to making better boys, better men and better people in our community, by enjoying the privileges of being out of doors …”

In using Haines’ gift of the Wizard Ranch, the Council decided to build on Haines’ tradition of doing things “bigger and better” and decided to begin holding its own Safaris. The tradition of the Safari was reborn in 1987, with the first of the modern Safaris. This was followed with Safaris occurring in 1991, 1995, 1999, 2003, 2007, 2010, 2015 and 2019. The most recent Safari was held on September 29-31, 2023.

In 2019 the Wizard Ranch was sold off to the Lancaster County Conservancy. The scouts are still permitted to hold Wizard Safaris at the location. The next Safari date in 2027 will be the 40th anniversary of the modern Wizard Safari!

== Sasquesahanough Lodge ==
The Sasquesahanough Lodge 11 was established January 1, 2011. The lodge was formed as a consolidation of the Susquehannock Lodge XI of Keystone Area Council and Tuckahoe Lodge 386 of York–Adams Area Council in 2010. As the New Birth of Freedom Council operated in its inaugural year, the two Order of the Arrow lodges began their consolidation.

The officers, advisors, and members of each lodge worked diligently throughout 2010 to construct guiding documents, develop program opportunities, and cultivate traditions of the new lodge. Mr. Jeff Richter was appointed as the inaugural lodge advisor. At one of the first merged council events, Wizard Safari held at Wizard Ranch, an election was held to elect the first slate of lodge officers. Justin Eberly was elected as the inaugural lodge chief.

At a special meeting in October 2010, the name "Sasquesahanough" was selected to be the lodge name. The name reflects the 1612 spelling of Susquehanna River and reflects the region covered by the lodge. The phoenix was selected to be the lodge totem. The phoenix represents the Sasquesahanough Lodge's emergence from the legacy lodges as a new entity.

Sasquesahanough Arrowmen celebrated the lodge's 11th anniversary through 2021-2022, chosen over the 10th anniversary due to the COVID-19 pandemic and celebration of the lodge's number.

== See also ==
- Scouting in Pennsylvania
- Troop 54 of Roundtown, Pa
