= Pennsylvania House of Representatives, District 47 =

American legislative district

Pennsylvania's 47th State House of Representatives district
Representative
Joseph D'Orsie; R–Mount Wolf
- Population (2022): 64,984

The 47th Pennsylvania House of Representatives District is located in southern Pennsylvania and has been represented by Joseph D'Orsie since 2023.

== District Profile ==
The 47th Pennsylvania House of Representatives District is located in York County and includes the following areas:

- Conewago Township
- East Manchester Township
- Hallam
- Hellam Township
- Manchester
- Manchester Township
- Mount Wolf
- Springettsbury Township (part)
  - District 02
  - District 03
  - District 07
- Wrightsville

== Representatives ==
Representative	Party	Years	District home	Note
Before 1969, seats were apportioned by county.
Roger Raymond Fischer	Republican	1969 – 1988		
Leo Joseph Trich, Jr.	Democrat	1989 – 2002	Retired	
District moved from Washington County to York County after 2002
Keith J. Gillespie	Republican	2003 – 2023	York	
Joseph D'Orsie	Republican	2023 – present	Mount Wolf	Incumbent

== Recent election results ==
PA House election, 2024: Pennsylvania House, District 47
Party	Candidate	Votes	%
Republican	Joe D'Orsie (incumbent)	22,322	62.84
Democratic	Edward Ritter	13,201	37.16
Total votes		35,523	100.00
Republican hold			

PA House election, 2022: Pennsylvania House, District 47
Party	Candidate	Votes	%
Republican	Joe D'Orsie	Unopposed	
Total votes		19,537	100.00
Republican hold			

PA House election, 2020: Pennsylvania House, District 47
Party	Candidate	Votes	%
Republican	Keith Gillespie (incumbent)	22,066	65.37
Democratic	Donald Alfred Owens	11,687	34.63
Total votes		33,753	100.00
Republican hold			

PA House election, 2018: Pennsylvania House, District 47
Party	Candidate	Votes	%
Republican	Keith Gillespie (incumbent)	16,286	64.30
Democratic	Michael Wascovich	9,044	35.70
Total votes		25,330	100.00
Republican hold			

PA House election, 2016: Pennsylvania House, District 47
Party	Candidate	Votes	%
Republican	Keith Gillespie (incumbent)	Unopposed	
Total votes		24,026	100.00
Republican hold			
