= Gates of hell =

Legendary entrances to the underworld

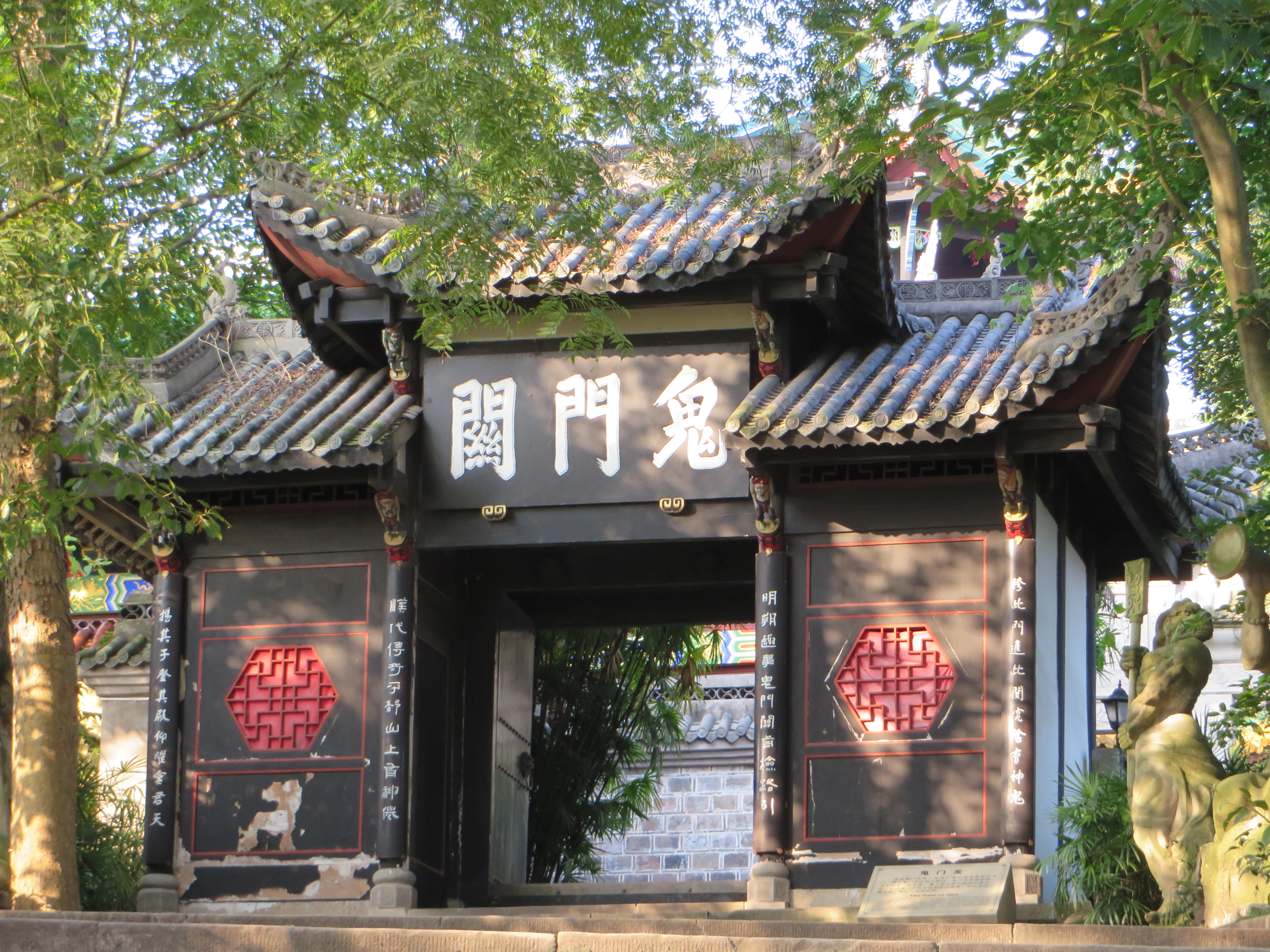
Fengdu Ghost City

The gates of hell are various places on the surface of the world that have acquired a legendary reputation for being entrances to the underworld. Often they are found in regions of unusual geological activity, particularly volcanic areas, or sometimes at lakes, caves, or mountains.

== Gates in the Greco-Roman world ==
Legends from both ancient Greece and Rome record stories of mortals who entered or were abducted into the netherworld through such gates. Aeneas visited the underworld, entering through a cave at the edge of Lake Avernus on the Bay of Naples. Hercules entered the Underworld from this same spot. In the middle of the Roman Forum is another entrance, Lacus Curtius, where according to legend, a Roman soldier named Curtius, bravely rode his horse into the entrance in a successful effort to close it, although both he and his horse perished in the deed.

Lerna Lake was one of the entrances to the Underworld.

Odysseus visited the Underworld, entering through river Acheron in northwest Greece.

Orpheus traveled to the Greek underworld in search of Eurydice by entering a cave at Taenarum or Cape Tenaron on the southern tip of the Peloponnese.

Pluto's Gate, Ploutonion in Greek, Plutonium in Latin, in modern-day Turkey unearthed by Italian archaeologists is said to be the entry gate to the Underworld; it is linked to the Greco-Roman mythology and tradition.

Rivers Cocytus, Lethe, Phlegethon and Styx were also entrances to the Underworld.

The god Hades kidnapped the goddess Persephone from a field in Sicily and led her to the Underworld through a cleft in the earth so he could marry her.

== Medieval gates ==
Into the Middle Ages, Mount Etna in Sicily was considered to be an entryway to hell.

The gates of hell were commonly depicted as jaws, forming the Hellmouth, which was simultaneously the entrance to hell and the mouth of a huge monster.

== Art ==
Auguste Rodin was commissioned to make a pair of bronze doors to symbolize the gates of hell. He received the commission on August 20, 1880, for a new art museum in Paris, to exhibit at the 1889 Exposition Universelle, which ultimately did not open; however in 1900, some of them were part of his first solo exhibition in Paris. Rodin spent seven years making the doors, with over 200 figures appearing on it. He was first inspired by Dante's Inferno but focused more on universal human emotions. During his lifetime the model was never cast and it was first cast in 1925. The Gates of Hell was described as one of the defining works of Rodin. Having hoped to exhibit his Gates at the 1889 Exposition Universelle, but probably too busy to finish them, the sculptor stopped working on them circa 1890.

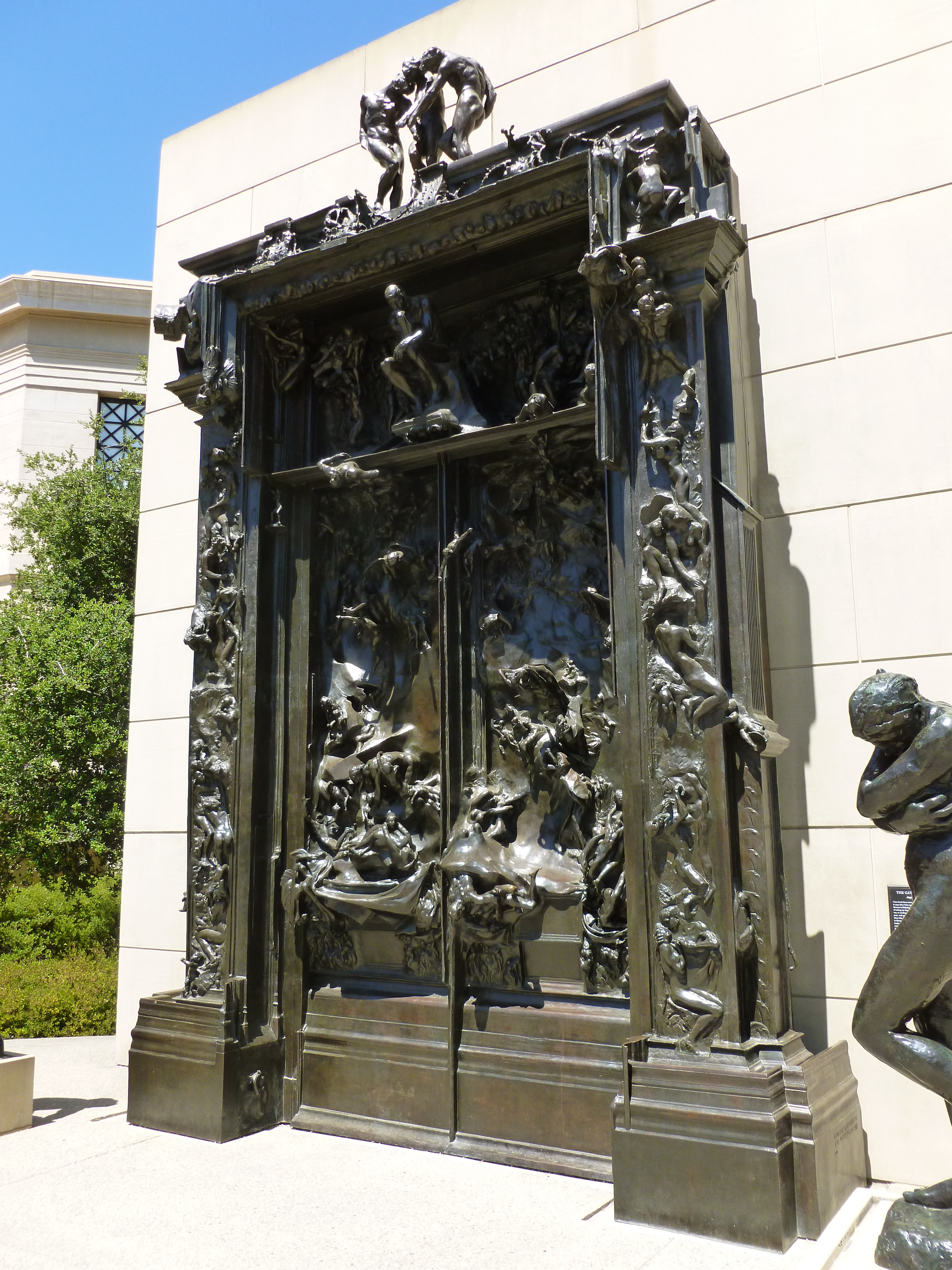
Rodin's sculpture at Stanford University, California

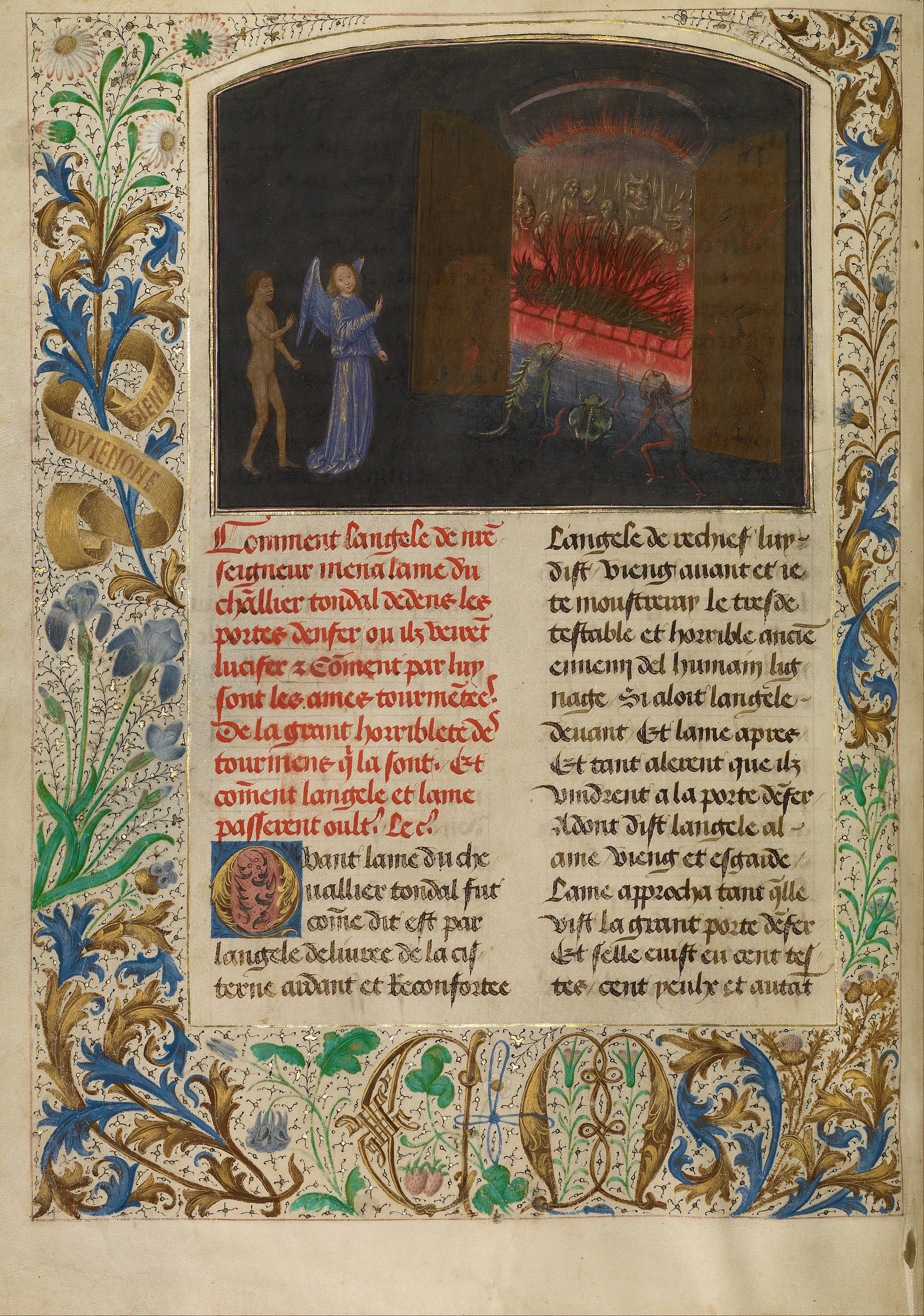
Simon Marmion (Flemish, active 1450–1489) – The Gates of Hell and Lucifer – Google Art Project

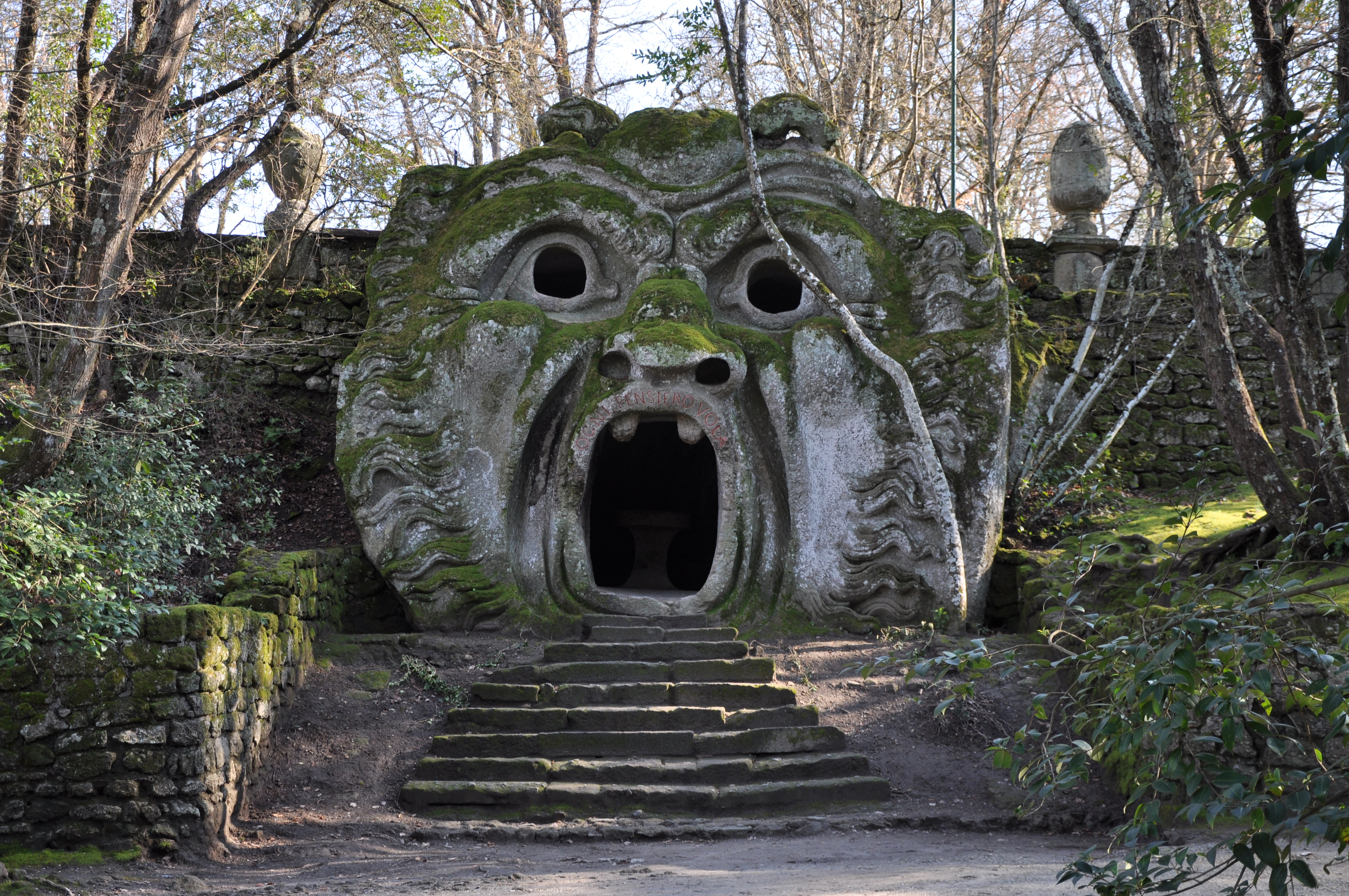
Orcus mouth in the Gardens of Bomarzo, c.1560

== Other gates ==
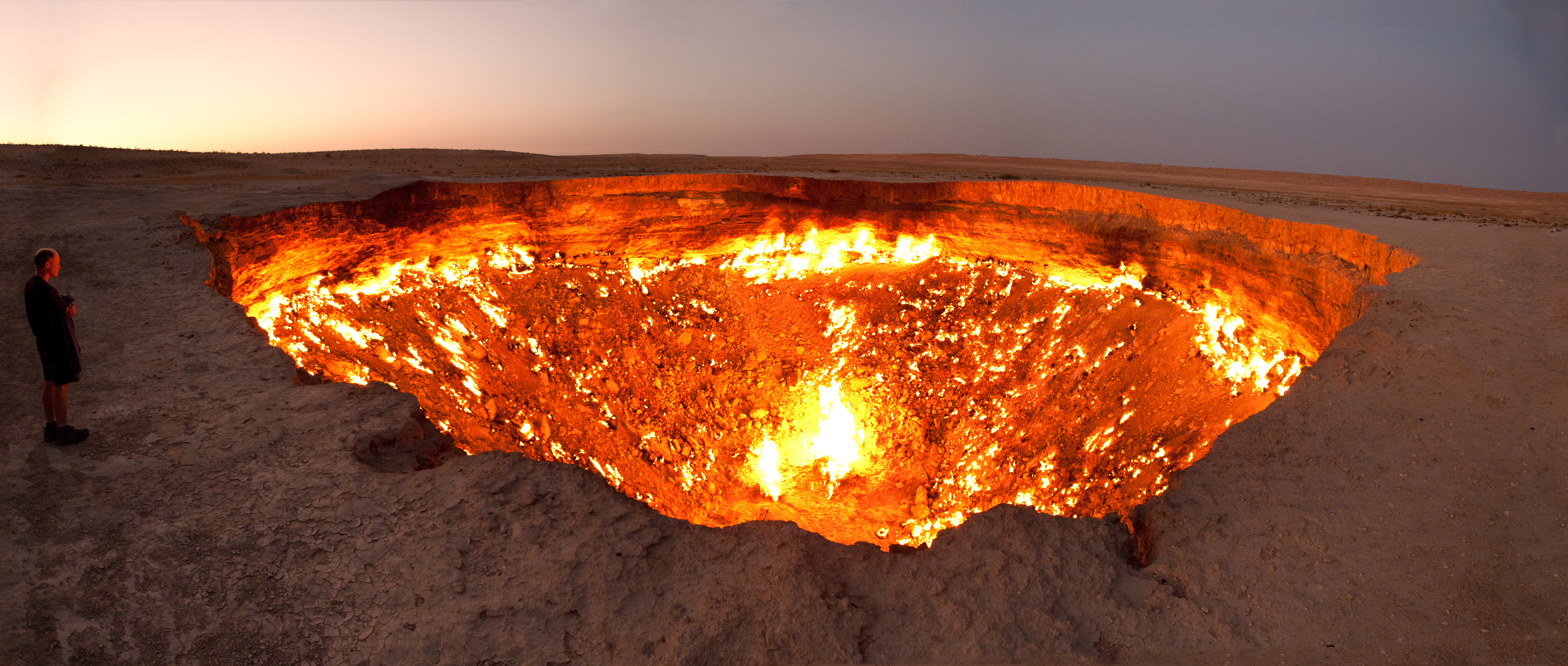
Darvaza gas crater, also known as the Door to Hell, a burning natural gas field in Derweze, Turkmenistan.

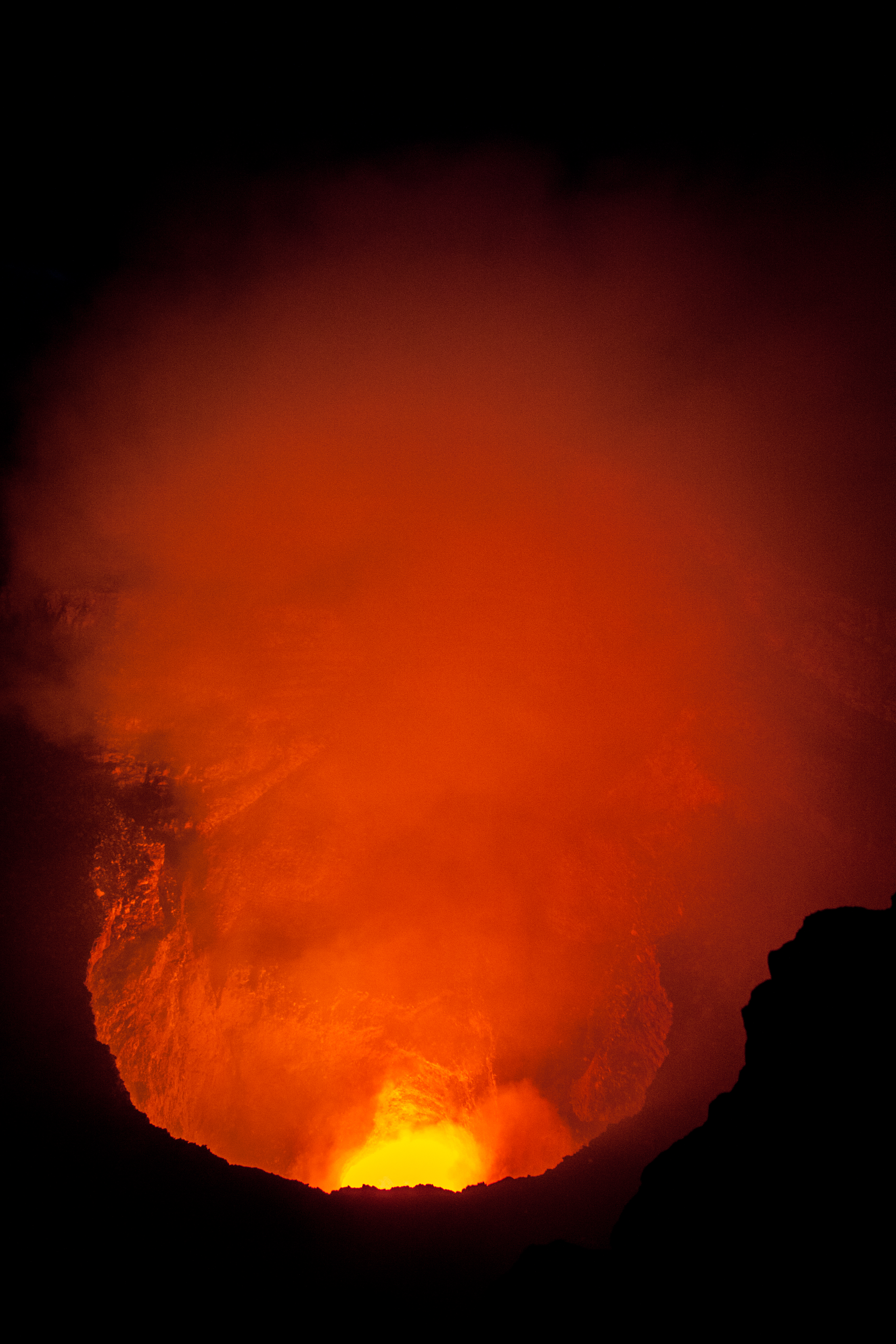
Masaya Volcano in Nicaragua, known locally as the mouth of hell.

- In China, Fengdu has a long history in the Taoist tradition of being a portal to hell.
- In Derweze, Turkmenistan, a burning natural gas fire in the middle of the Karakum Desert is known as the Door to Hell or Darvaza gas crater.
- According to Hawaiian folklore, Waipio Valley contains an entrance to the lower world, Lua-o-Milu, which is now concealed with sand.
- Hellam Township near York, Pennsylvania, is the subject of a modern urban legend claiming that it contains the Seven Gates of Hell.
- Mount Osore in northern Japan is said to be an entrance to hell.
- Murgo (lit. '"the gateway of darkness"' in Tibetan) was a caravan stop along Karakoram Pass during historical times. The valley to the east of Murgo is the furthest west in India, which the Chinese People's Liberation Army reached during the India Chinese war in 1962.
- Hell's Gate National Park is a National Park in Kenya which is named for the intense geothermal activity within its boundaries.
- Masaya Volcano located in Nicaragua is known as another gate of hell, it is part of the first national park in the country. According to local lore, the volcano was a deity unto itself. It is locally known to the indigenous as the "mouth of hell". In the park is a lava tube formed by lava flows; one can find bats and look inside and observe the glowing lava in the dark crater mouth of the volcano. It is an active volcano, constantly emitting gases. Daytime and nighttime visits are available at the park, it is a popular tourist attraction for locals and international tourists.

== Religious contexts ==
In 1878, Rev. Thomas De Witt Talmage delivered a widely reprinted sermon titled "The Gates of Hell" at the Brooklyn Tabernacle, based on the scripture Matthew 16:18, message by Jesus to Peter "...on this rock, I will build my church, and the gates of Hell shall not prevail against it." Talmage's gates were metaphorical, including "infamous literature," "dissolute dance," "indiscreet apparel," and "alcoholic beverage".

In ancient Indian Hindu tradition the Orion constellation where the vernal equinox is stated to occur, the Milky Way and the Canis were considered to form the border between Devaloka (heaven) and Yamaloka (hell); the Milky Way forming the dividing river between heaven and hell and the Canis Major and Canis Minor representing dogs that guarded the Gates of Hell.

== Historical context ==
In Việt Nam, Mặt Quỷ (English: Devil's Face) is a mountain located in Chi Lăng commune, Lạng Sơn province. This place was once known as the burial ground for Chinese invaders, for it was the place where the Jin dynasty failed to conqueur, the burial of Ni Run 倪潤 in the 2nd War Against The Yuan-Mongols and Liu Sheng in the Battle of Chi Lăng; so the Chinese invaders had called this mountain the Gate of hell (Chinese: 鬼門关, romanized: guǐménguān).

== In popular culture ==
- In August 2010, the History Channel premiered a show entitled "The Gates of Hell" (History Specials: Gates of Hell (Season 1, Episode 105), which visited caves and volcanoes in Nicaragua, Belize, Greece, Iceland, Ireland and Ethiopia, to examine the origins of these myths. It featured archaeologists, scholars, explorers and others working in this field.
- The September 2012 edition of Weird NJ magazine describes a large tunnel, referred to by urban legends as "The Gates of Hell". It is a storm drain in Clifton, New Jersey.
- The February 2016 edition of Weird Ohio magazine describes a similar sewer system referred to as "The Gates of Hell" or the "Blood Bowl" in the High Street area of Columbus, Ohio.

== See also ==
- Batagaika crater, a thermokarst depression growing in the East Siberian taiga
- Darvaza gas crater, also known as the "Door to Hell"
- Hellmouth
- Rathcroghan
- Seven Gates of Hell, a modern urban legend concerning the myth
- Stull, Kansas and the legend of Stull Cemetery
- St Patrick's Purgatory in Ireland
- The Well to Hell hoax
- "The Gates of Hell", a song performed in 2008 by Italian rappers Noyz Narcos and Duke Montana
