= Joe D'Orsie =

American politician

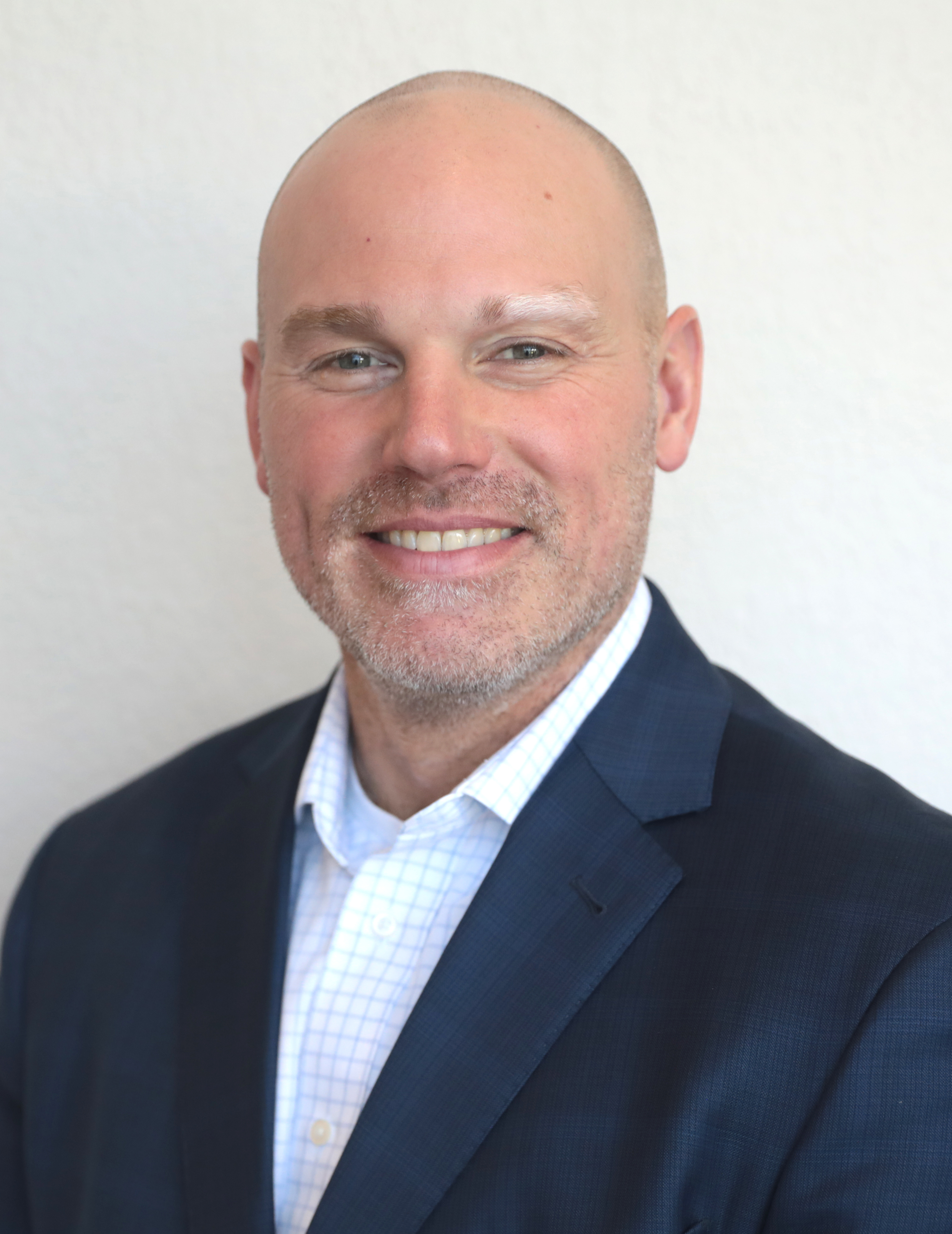

Member of the Pennsylvania House of Representatives from the 47th district
- Incumbent
- Assumed office January 3, 2023
- Preceded by: Keith Gillespie

Personal details
- Born: c. 1986 York County, Pennsylvania, U.S.
- Party: Republican
- Spouse: Adrienne
- Children: 2
- Education: Duquesne University (B.A.)
- Alma mater: Dallastown Area High School
- Website: www.repjoed.com

Joseph Frank D'Orsie (born c. 1986) is an American politician who has represented the 47th District in the Pennsylvania House of Representatives as a Republican since 2023.

== Early life ==
D'Orsie was born in York County, Pennsylvania, and was raised in Dallastown. He graduated from Dallastown Area High School and later earned a Bachelor of Arts degree in public relations from Duquesne University. In 2012, D'Orsie served with Youth with a Mission as a missionary in the Dominican Republic. From 2016 to 2022, he was communications director at Praise Community Church, an affiliate of the Church of God (Cleveland, Tennessee).

== Political career ==
In 2022, D'Orsie defeated incumbent Pennsylvania State Representative Keith Gillespie in a primary challenge and went on to win the general election to represent the 47th District unopposed. D'Orsie's success in the primary was viewed as a backlash from the more ardently rightwing faction of the Republican Party because the incumbent had not been as hard-line on conservative issues.

D'Orsie is a member of the Pennsylvania Freedom Caucus.

== Political positions ==
=== Education issues ===
After the Central York School Board published a banned resources list that included books about Black and Latino representation, D'Orsie wrote an op-ed in the York Daily Record saying, "the concept of banning books should be intolerable to us." However, he claimed what the board drew up was not a book ban, and any talk of a book ban was a deception perpetrated by the media. D'Orsie also said instead of teaching about "heroic Americans like Rosa Parks and Frederick Douglass" the district's amended curriculum included "pornographic [material]" and "hate filled, so called 'anti-racist' selections that condemn 'whiteness' and pit students against each other."

In March 2023, D'Orsie introduced a bill that would prohibit bias reporting systems at state-funded universities, saying that such systems infringe on freedom of speech.

D'Orsie supports school choice. He argues that a school choice program would benefit students looking for better or more specialized education, rather than continuing to fund what he claims is an ineffective public school system. In December 2023, D'Orsie introduced a bill that would alter Pennsylvania's education funding to be distributed on a per student basis rather than sending funds to individual school districts.

In 2024, D'Orsie sponsored legislation that would protect teachers from repercussions if they refuse to use students' preferred pronouns.

=== COVID-19 pandemic ===
D'Orsie opposed mitigation mandates related to the COVID-19 pandemic and referred to such mandates as "unconstitutional" and an "abuse of power." He argued it was for individuals themselves to respond how they saw fit.

=== Taxation ===
D'Orsie supports abolishing school taxes.

In 2023, D'Orsie drafted a bill that would repeal Pennsylvania's automatic gas tax increase.

== Personal life ==
D'Orsie lives in Mount Wolf, Pennsylvania, with his wife, Adrienne, and their two children.

== Electoral history ==
2022 Pennsylvania House of Representatives Republican primary election, District 47
Party	Candidate	Votes	%
Republican	Joe D'Orsie	5,178	59.61
Republican	Keith Gillespie (incumbent)	3,491	40.19
Write-in		17	0.2
Total votes		8,686	100.00

2022 Pennsylvania House of Representatives election, District 47
Party	Candidate	Votes	%
Republican	Joe D'Orsie	19,537	91.38
Write-in		1,843	8.62
Total votes		21,380	100.00

2024 Pennsylvania House of Representatives election, District 47
Party	Candidate	Votes	%
Republican	Joe D'Orsie (incumbent)	22,322	62.66
Democratic	Edward Ritter	13,201	37.05
Write-in		66	0.19
Total votes		35,589	100.00
