= East Manchester Township, Pennsylvania =

Township in Pennsylvania, US

Coordinates: 40°03′00″N 76°40′59″W

- Township
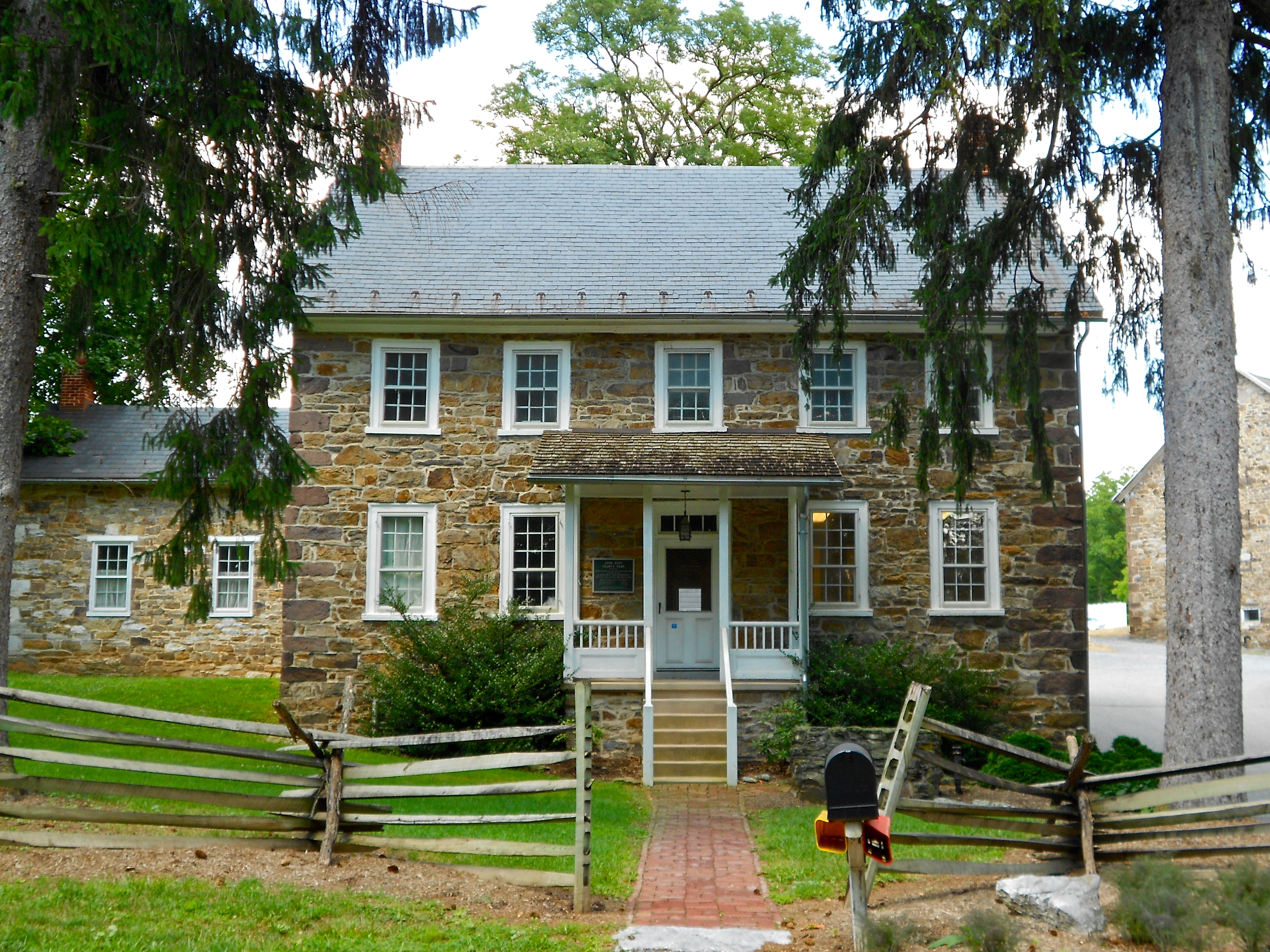
- House at the John Rudy County Park

- Seal

- Location in York County and the state of Pennsylvania.
- Country: United States
- State: Pennsylvania
- County: York
- Settled: 1735
- Incorporated: 1887

Government
  - Type: Board of Supervisors

Area
  - Total: 17.18 sq mi (44.50 km^{2})
  - Land: 16.64 sq mi (43.11 km^{2})
  - Water: 0.54 sq mi (1.39 km^{2})

Population (2020)
  - Total: 8,331 ▲
  - Estimate (2023): 8,589
  - Density: 454.2/sq mi (175.36/km^{2})
- Time zone: UTC-5 (Eastern (EST))
  - Summer (DST): UTC-4 (EDT)
- Area code: 717
- FIPS code: 42-133-21464
- Website: emanchestertwp.com

Historical population
Census	Pop.	Note	%±
1930	1,438		—
1940	1,429		−0.6%
1950	1,784		24.8%
1960	2,253		26.3%
1970	1,735		−23.0%
1980	3,564		105.4%
1990	3,714		4.2%
2000	5,078		36.7%
2010	7,264		43.0%
2020	8,331		14.7%
2023 (est.)	8,539		2.5%
U.S. Decennial Census

East Manchester Township is a township in York County, Pennsylvania, United States. As of the 2020 census, the township population was 8,331.

== History ==
Michael and Magdealena Bixler Farmstead, also known as John Rudy County Park, was listed on the National Register of Historic Places in 2000.

== Geography ==
According to the United States Census Bureau, the township has a total area of 17.2 square miles (45 km^{2}), of which 16.6 square miles (43 km^{2}) is land and 0.6 square miles (1.6 km^{2}) (3.43%) is water. The township surrounds the boroughs of Manchester and Mount Wolf, located side by side at the center of the township.

== Demographics ==
As of the census of 2000, there were 5,078 people, 1,926 households, and 1,504 families living in the township. The population density was 305.5 inhabitants per square mile (118.0/km^{2}). There were 1,986 housing units at an average density of 119.5 units per square mile (46.1 units/km^{2}). The racial makeup of the township was 97.40% White, 1.04% African American, 0.20% Native American, 0.67% Asian, 0.26% from other races, and 0.43% from two or more races. Hispanic or Latino of any race were 0.93% of the population.

There were 1,926 households, out of which 35.2% had children under the age of 18 living with them, 67.4% were married couples living together, 6.8% had a female householder with no husband present, and 21.9% were non-families. 17.9% of all households were made up of individuals, and 7.2% had someone living alone who was 65 years of age or older. The average household size was 2.64 and the average family size was 2.97.

In the township the population was spread out, with 24.6% under the age of 18, 5.7% from 18 to 24, 33.5% from 25 to 44, 25.0% from 45 to 64, and 11.2% who were 65 years of age or older. The median age was 37 years. For every 100 females there were 100.8 males. For every 100 females age 18 and over, there were 98.3 males.

The median income for a household in the township was $49,417, and the median income for a family was $56,186. Males had a median income of $38,672 versus $26,506 for females. The per capita income for the township was $20,559. About 1.5% of families and 2.6% of the population were below the poverty line, including 1.5% of those under the age of 18 and 3.4% of those ages 65 and older.

== Education ==
East Manchester Township is served by the Northeastern York School District.

== Economy ==
East Manchester Township is home to one of only four Starbucks roasting facilities in the world.
