= Northeastern High School (Pennsylvania) =

Northeastern Senior High School
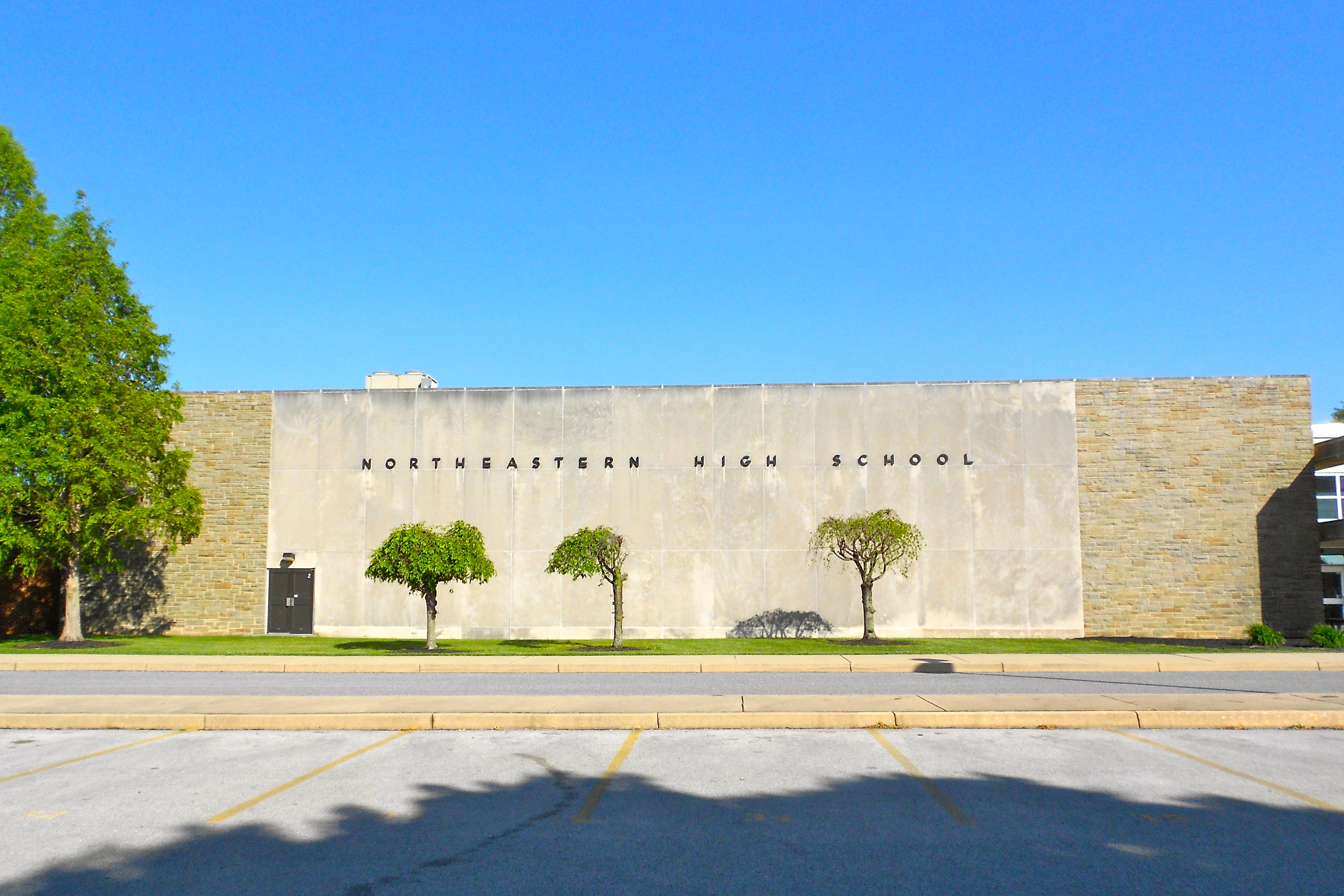

Location
- 300 High Street; Manchester, York County, Pennsylvania 17345; United States; 40.0652°N 76.7157°W

Information
- Type: Public
- School district: Northeastern York School District
- Superintendent: Dr. Jason Bottiglieri
- Principal: Karen Evans
- Staff: 72.85 (FTE)
- Grades: 9-12
- Enrollment: 1,151 (2023–24)
- Student to teacher ratio: 15.80
- Campus size: Large
- Campus type: Midsized, Suburban
- Color
- Team name: Bobcats
- Website: www.nebobcats.org/schools/northeastern-high-school/

Northeastern York High School is a medium sized, suburban public school district in Manchester, York County, Pennsylvania. Located at 300 High Street, it is the sole high school in the Northeastern York School District. As of the 2023-2024 school year Northeastern Senior High School reported an enrollment of 1,151 students in grades 9th through 12th. The school employed 73 teachers resulting in a student-teacher ratio of 15.8:1.
