= Conewago Township =

Conewago Township may refer to one off the following places in the United States:

- Conewago Township, York County, Pennsylvania
- Conewago Township, Adams County, Pennsylvania
- Conewago Township, Dauphin County, Pennsylvania
