= Northeastern York School District =

School district in Pennsylvania

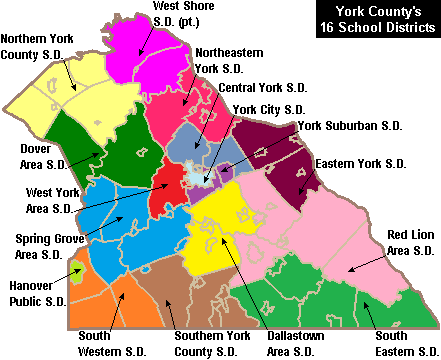

Address
- 41 Harding Street Manchester, York County, Pennsylvania, 17345-1119; United States

District information
- Type: Public
- Grades: K-12
- Schools: 8 (4 Elementary, 2 Intermediate, 1 Middle, 1 High)

Students and staff
- District mascot: Bobcats

Other information
- Website: nebobcats.org

The Northeastern School District (also known as Northeastern York School District) is a midsized, suburban public school district in York County in the South Central region of Pennsylvania. Municipalities served by the district include: Mount Wolf, Manchester, East Manchester Township, York Haven, Goldsboro, Newberry Township, and Conewago Township. Northeastern School District encompasses approximately 50 square miles (130 km^{2}). According to 2000 federal census data, it served a resident population of 18,282 people. In 2010, the district's population had grown to 23,399 people. In 2009, the district residents’ per capita income was $18,799, while the median family income was $48,744. In the Commonwealth, the median family income was $49,501 and the United States median family income was $49,445, in 2010.

Northeastern School District operates eight schools:

- Conewago Elementary School
- Mount Wolf Elementary School
- Orendorf Elementary School
- York Haven Elementary School
- Shallow Brook Intermediate School
- Spring Forge Intermediate School
- Northeastern Middle School
- Northeastern Senior High School.

== Extracurriculars ==
Northeastern School District offers a variety of clubs, activities and an extensive sports program.

=== Sports ===
The district funds:

=== High School Sports ===
==== Boys ====
- Baseball – AAAAA
- Basketball- AAAAA
- Cross country – AAA
- Football – AAAAA
- Golf – AAA
- Soccer – AAAA
- Swimming and diving – AAA
- Tennis – AAA
- Track and field – AAA
- Volleyball – AAA
- Wrestling – AAA

Girls

- Basketball – AAAAA
- Cheerleading – AAAAAA
- Cross country – AAA
- Field hockey – AA
- Soccer (fall season)) – AAAA
- Softball – AAAAA
- Swimming and diving – AAA
- Girls' tennis – AAA
- Track and field – AAA
- Volleyball – AAAA
- Golf –

=== Middle School Sports ===
Boys

- Basketball
- Cross country
- Football
- Soccer
- Track and field
- Wrestling
- Swimming
- Volleyball

Girls

- Basketball
- Cross country
- Field hockey
- Soccer (fall)
- Softball
- Track and field
- Volleyball
- Swimming

According to PIAA directory February 2019

Northeastern tied the PIAA record for consecutive boys' volleyball state championships by winning its sixth consecutive title Saturday, on June 9, 2018, in Rec Hall at Pennsylvania State University in State College, Pennsylvania. Northeastern rallied for a 3–1 win over Manheim Central to claim their sixth PIAA championship in a row.
