= Michael and Magdealena Bixler Farmstead =

- U.S. National Register of Historic Places
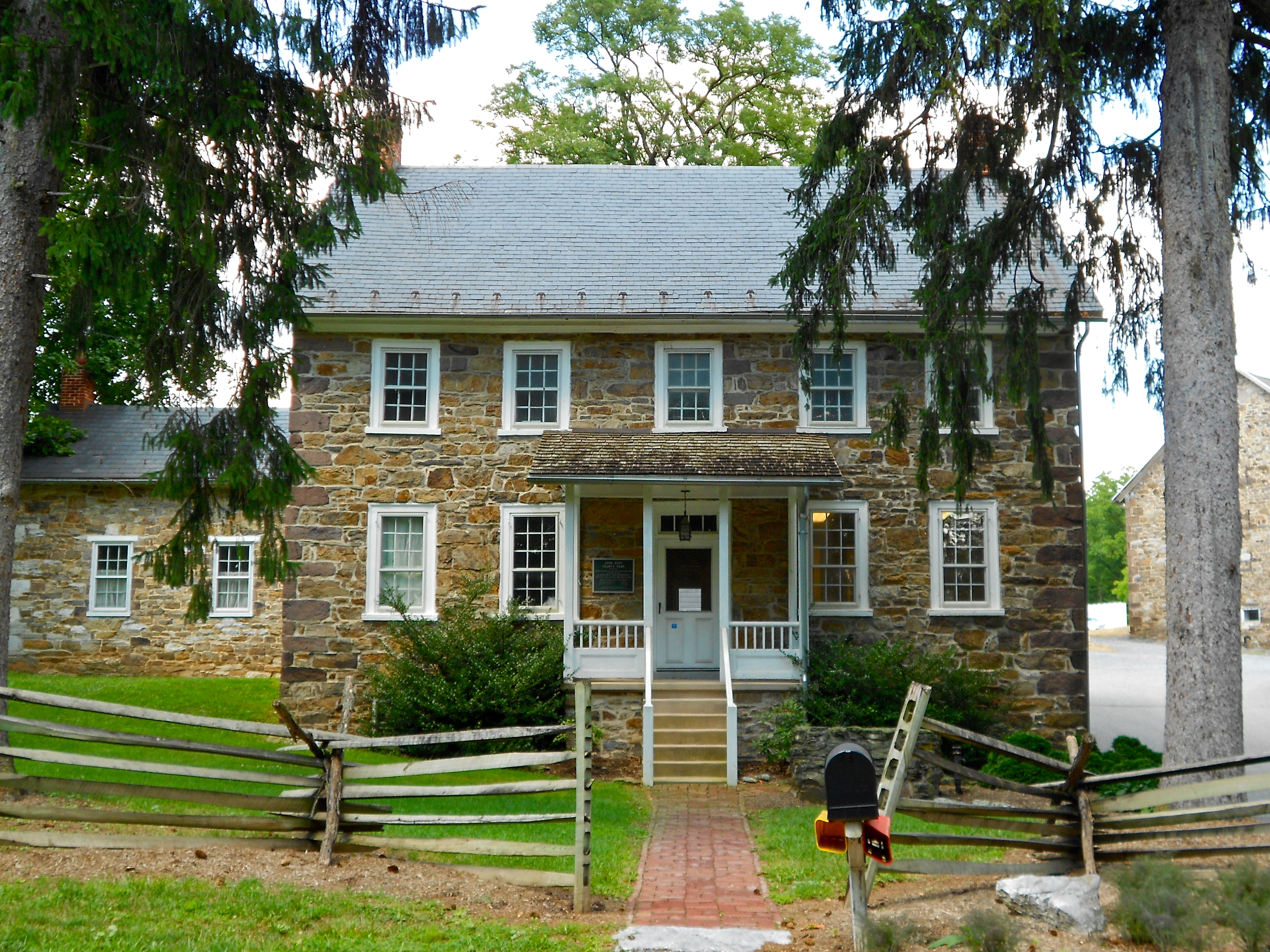
- Logo

- Location within Pennsylvania Location within the United States
- Location: 400 Mundis Race Rd., East Manchester Township, Pennsylvania
- Coordinates: 40°1′15″N 76°42′16″W
- Area: 3.5 acres (1.4 ha)
- Architectural style: Georgian, Sweitzer barn
- NRHP reference No.: 00000850
- Added to NRHP: July 27, 2000

The Michael and Magdealena Bixler Farmstead, also known as the John Rudy County Park, is an historic property in East Manchester Township, Pennsylvania, York County, Pennsylvania, United States.

It was added to the National Register of Historic Places in 2000.

== History and architectural features ==
This historic property includes seven stone and frame buildings that date from roughly 1799 to 1910. They are a Georgian-style house, a Sweitzer barn (1811), a summer kitchen, a corn barn, a hog barn, a tobacco barn, and a milk house.

The house, which was built circa 1799, is a two-and-one-half-story, stone dwelling that sits on a limestone foundation. It has a slate covered gable roof. Also located on the property is a hand-dug well that dates to 1799 or earlier, the foundations of a house that date to roughly 1737, and a smokehouse. The property was donated to York County in 1973, and is operated as a county park.

It was added to the National Register of Historic Places in 2000.
