= Leo Trich =

American politician

Leo Joseph Trich, Jr.

Member of the Pennsylvania House of Representatives from the 47th district
- In office January 3, 1989 – November 30, 2002
- Preceded by: Roger Raymond Fischer
- Succeeded by: Keith J. Gillespie (district moved to York County)

Personal details
- Born: July 23, 1951 (age 75)
- Party: Democratic
- Spouse: Adele Kathleen
- Children: 3 children

Leo Joseph Trich, Jr. (born July 23, 1951) is a former Democratic member of the Pennsylvania House of Representatives.

== Biography ==
Trich is a 1969 graduate of Washington High School. He attended California University of Pennsylvania and Washington and Jefferson College.

Prior to elective office, he served as Commissioner of PONY Baseball the Washington, Pennsylvania-based international youth baseball program, where he worked from 1971 to 1986. He also served as vice president of the USA Baseball from 1978 to 1986 and as a member of the United States Olympic Committee from 1980 to 1985. Trich was also a member of baseball's organizing committee, which earned him a position on that sport's task force at the 1984 Olympic Games held in Los Angeles, CA.

Trich later served as United States representative for the International Baseball Federation (IBAF). In 1989, then IBAF President Dr. Robert Smith, offered Trich the executive director's position, but Trich declined, opting instead to pursue a career in government.

At the age of twenty-four, Trich became the youngest person to be elected and serve as a member of the Washington City Council. Following his city council tenure (from 1976 through 1980), Trich worked in county government as an assistant to the county commissioners (1987–88) and then was appointed by PA Governor Robert P. Casey as District Administrator for the Pennsylvania Department of Revenue in 1988.

Trich was first elected to represent the 47th legislative district in the Pennsylvania House of Representatives in 1988. After serving seven terms, he retired prior to the 2002 election.

== Later career ==
Following his political career, Trich returned to sports. While in his last term as a state representative, he founded Ballpark Scholarships Inc, a non-profit volunteer organization that raised money and spearheaded the building of a $7 million minor league ballpark (Falconi Field, now known as Consol Energy Park). Trich is considered the person most responsible for developing this sports venue and bringing minor league professional baseball back to his hometown of Washington.

From 2003 thru 2007, Trich served as the director of development with the Frontier Professional Baseball League. In 2008, he joined five others, including Dr. Chris Hanners, in forming a new summer collegiate baseball program known as the Prospect College League. In 2009 and 2010, he served as the General Manager and majority owner of the Butler BlueSox, a summer collegiate team in the Prospect League.

Since 2004, Trich has also worked as a consultant regarding sports, government relations and land development issues. His clients have included: The Frontier Professional Baseball League, the Washington Wild Things professional baseball team, the Prospect Summer College Baseball League, Goodwill Industries of Southwestern Pennsylvania, United Washington Associates, and the Chuck Tanner Awards Banquet (Rotary Club of Pittsburgh PA).

In 2019, Trich took part in two World Affairs Council of Pittsburgh events, including one he organized and hosted for area high school seniors at Robert Morris University. The project encouraged activism in both school and community, as well as consideration for careers in public service. In 2020, Trich was invited to take part in a Trans-Atlantic Goodwill project, representing Pennsylvania as a former state elected official. The event, sponsored in cooperation with the EU Parliament and a national association of state legislators, was postponed in May 2020, because of the COVID-19 pandemic. Trich attended, when it was rescheduled and took place in Brussels Belgium and the Netherlands, in August 2021.

Since that time, he was invited back to Europe at the request of and part of, the EU Parliament program designed to better relationships between the US and the EU, regarding state government officials and organizations that understand the importance of trans-Atlantic partnerships and alliances. The follow-up trips took place in 2022, 2023 and most recently in February 2024.

== Awards and other honors ==
In 1986, Trich was listed on PONY Baseball's Wall of Fame. Six years later, in 1992, he was chosen to attend Harvard's John F. Kennedy School of Government Leadership Summer Semester Program. One of just fifty participants selected (one from each state legislature), he represented the Pennsylvania House of Representatives.

In 2002, Trich was inducted into the Washington-Greene County Chapter of the Pennsylvania Sports Hall of Fame.

In 2017, he was honored by the Washington County Historical Society with induction into its own Hall of Fame.
