= Martin Schultz House =

Historic house in Pennsylvania, United States

- U.S. National Register of Historic Places
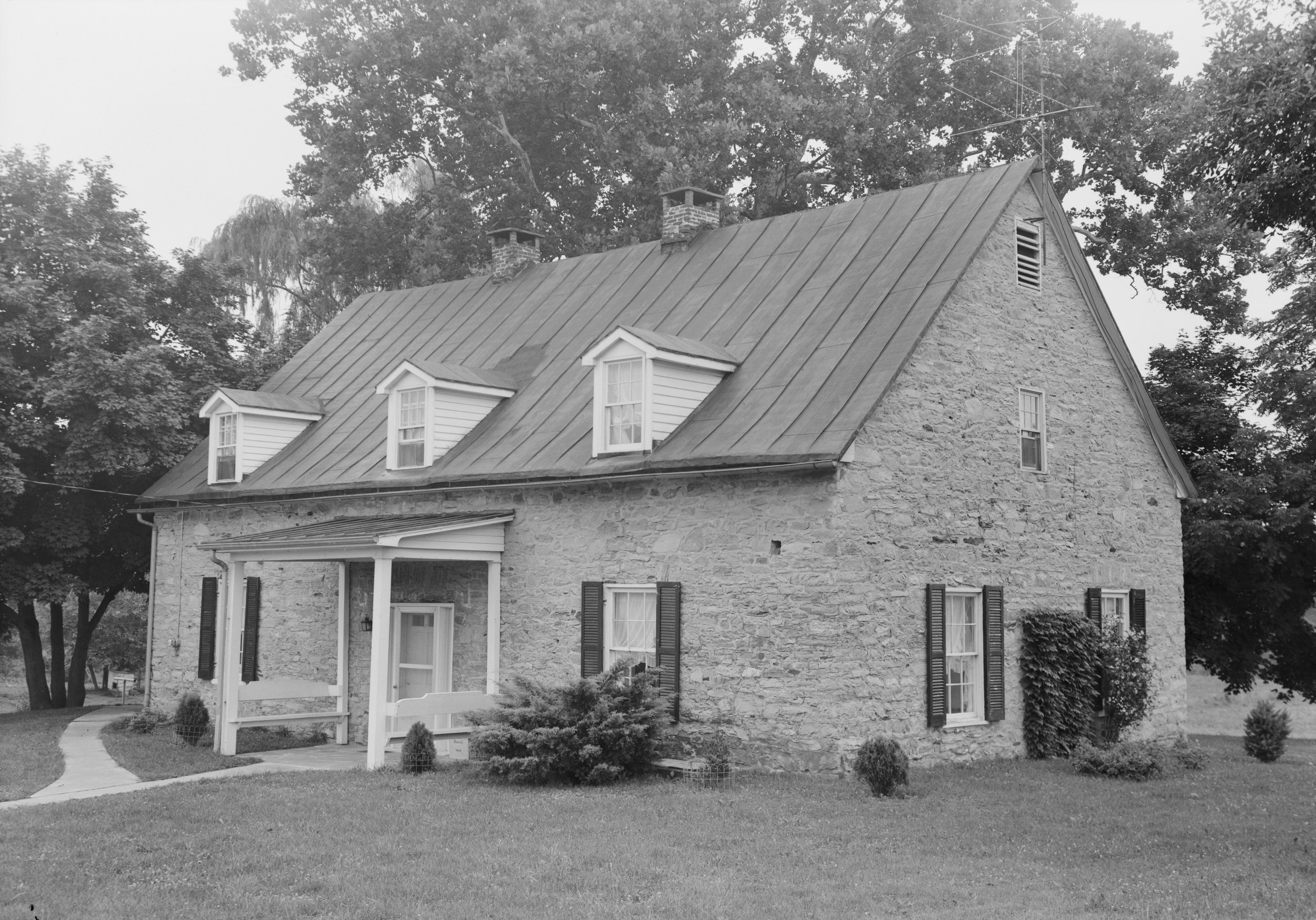
- Martin Schultz House, August 1962

- Location within Pennsylvania Location within the United States
- Location: 155 Emig Street, Hallam, Pennsylvania
- Coordinates: 40°0′2″N 76°36′33″W
- Area: 3.8 acres (1.5 ha)
- Built: c. 1736
- Architectural style: German Vernacular
- NRHP reference No.: 93000057
- Added to NRHP: March 11, 1993

Martin Schultz House is a historic home located at Hallam, York County, Pennsylvania. It was built about 1736, and is a 1 1/2-story, rectangular blue limestone early Germanic dwelling built into a hillside. It measures 30 by 50 feet (9.1 by 15.2 m) and has a steeply pitched roof with gable dormers. It was restored between 1956 and 1960.

It was added to the National Register of Historic Places in 1993.
