= Toad Road =

- Theatrical film poster
- Directed by: Jason Banker
- Written by: Jason Banker
- Produced by: Jason Banker; Liz Levine; Adrian Salpeter
- Starring: Sara Anne Jones; James Davidson; Jim Driscoll
- Cinematography: Jason Banker; Jorge Torres-Torres
- Edited by: Jorge Torres-Torres
- Music by: Dag Rosenqvist
- Production company: Blackout Films
- Distributed by: The Woodshed; Artsploitation; Random Bench Productions
- Release dates: July 26, 2012 (Fantasia Film Festival); October 18, 2013 (United States)
- Running time: 76 minutes
- Country: United States
- Language: English

Toad Road is a 2012 American independent horror thriller film directed and written by Jason Banker. Toad Road stars Sara Anne Jones, who died of a drug overdose shortly after the film's premiere, as a young college student that is introduced to drugs and becomes obsessed with an urban legend about a road leading to Hell. The film premiered at the Fantasia Film Festival and had a limited release in October 2013.

== Plot ==
Slacker James and his friends spend their days abusing alcohol and drugs and their nights at various parties. He moves through his life with a sense of boredom until he meets Sara, a college student seeking enlightenment from drugs. Knowing that this would prove harmful to her, James tries to dissuade Sara from this idea but is ultimately unsuccessful. As she becomes more and more addicted to drugs, Sara becomes obsessed with the idea of Toad Road, a road in York, Pennsylvania, that possesses seven gates rumored to lead directly to Hell. Legends state that each gate, once passed, causes increasing disorientation and eventual loss of self.

She persuades James to join her in an excursion to Toad Road, where the two take acid and eventually become separated. James ends up passing out and upon waking, finds that six months have passed since he and Sara went to Toad Road. She has been reported as missing and he is considered to be a person of interest in her disappearance. While he was missing, his friends have returned home, and he no longer has a place to stay. He moves into a shack owned by his uncle, and, pressed for details by the police and locals, turns to self-destructive activities, such as encouraging people to beat him up. Battered and feeling guilty about Sara's disappearance, he is haunted by visions of Sara. James asks her if he is responsible for her disappearance, but he receives no answer.

== Cast ==
- Sara Anne Jones as Sara
- James Davidson as James
- Jim Driscoll as Detective
- Whitleigh Higuera as Whitleigh
- Damon Johansen as Uncle Damon
- Andy Martin as Psychiatrist
- Scott Rader as Scott
- Jamie Siebold as Jamie
- Donnie Simmons as Donnie
- James Wyatt as Driver

== Production ==
Banker first began working on Toad Road in 2008 and cast Jones as Sara, a college student addicted to drugs that becomes fascinated with the legend of Toad Road. He stated that he wanted to use the idea of drug addiction as a foil to the idea of the urban legend of Toad Road. Banker was inspired to create the film after watching footage for his documentary All Tomorrow’s Parties. Of the party footage, Banker commented that while the footage was great, it didn't "really [say] anything" and that it would be interesting to create a story "that felt like this but actually went and had a real story to it". Elijah Wood came across the film in 2012 during the film festival Nightmare City and decided to help produce Toad Road. Many of the scenes were improvised. Banker said he shot "a wealth a footage", then edited it into a series of tonal shifts. The cast were non-professionals that Banker recruited from social networking website Myspace. The interpersonal conflicts were in some cases real, as Banker wanted to find a group with natural and existing tensions. He intended to shoot the entire film himself but eventually called in Jorge Torres-Torres to assist.

== Release ==
Toad Road premiered at the Fantasia Film Festival on July 26, 2012, and had a limited theatrical release in which it opened October 18, 2013, in Los Angeles and a week later in New York. It was released on DVD and video on demand on December 10, 2013.

== Reception ==
Rotten Tomatoes, a review aggregator, reports that 83% of six surveyed critics gave it a positive review; the average rating was 5.6/10. Metacritic rated it 54/100. Dennis Harvey of Variety wrote that the film does not deliver on its promised horror elements but might be better appreciated as a slice of life drama. Harvey states that it is "intriguing if still somewhat unsatisfying on those terms", but it may reward repeat viewings. Frank Scheck of The Hollywood Reporter called it "audacious but aimless". Jeannette Catsoulis of The New York Times called it an "uncomfortably authentic drama about the horrors of dedicated drug use" that "never overcomes the fact that watching drugged-out wastrels is rarely interesting". Martin Tsai of The Los Angeles Times called it "a junkie hipster spin on the unreliable-narrator conceit" that is like "the CliffsNotes version of Dante Alighieri's Inferno". Samuel Zimmerman of Fangoria rated it 3.5/4 stars and wrote that the film's depiction of wasted suburban youth is unoriginal but raw, and it is "where the unstaged, more truly frightening moments can be found". Scott Halam of Dread Central rated it 3/5 stars and wrote, "It does take a very long time to get up and running, but if you're into reality bending films, you might dig this." Michael Nordine of The Village Voice wrote, "Though far from perfect, Toad Road is also the first unique horror film to come along in years".

Christopher Bell of Indiewire wrote, "While it focuses on a subset of people that we've seen far too much in independent film, it brings some fresh perspective to the table". Kurt Halfyard of Twitch Film wrote, "For all the easy moralizing of more conventional drug dramas, Toad Road offers a surprisingly similar morality in a decidedly more arty package." Chuck Bowen of Slant Magazine rated it 2.5/5 stars and wrote, "The behavior is alarmingly and realistically staged, and you don't have to be a prude to wonder if 75 minutes in the company of these people is really time well spent." Bill Gibron of PopMatters rated it 6/10 stars and wrote, "On ambition alone, Jason Banker and his cast deserve a lot of credit."

=== Awards ===
- Best Feature Film, Lausanne Underground Film and Music Festival (2012)
- Best Director Award, Fantasia Film Festival (2012)
- Best Actor Award, Fantasia Film Festival (2012)
