= Keith Gillespie (politician) =

American politician

Keith J. Gillespie

Member of the Pennsylvania House of Representatives from the 47th district
- In office January 7, 2003 – November 30, 2022
- Preceded by: Leo Joseph Trich, Jr.
- Succeeded by: Joe D'Orsie

Personal details
- Born: September 18, 1952 (age 73) Wilmington, Delaware, U.S.
- Party: Republican

Keith J. Gillespie (born September 18, 1952) is an American politician who represented the 47th district in the Pennsylvania House of Representatives as a Republican from 2003 to 2022.

== Early life and education ==
Gillespie was born on September 18, 1952 in Wilmington, Delaware. He graduated from Solanco High School in 1970 and attended Keystone Junior College and Franklin & Marshall College.

== Career ==
Gillespie worked as a paramedic in the 1970s and was director of safety, security, and pre-hospital systems at York Memorial Hospital in Pennsylvania from 1980 to 2003. He was deputy coroner of York County, Pennsylvania from 1997 to 1998.

=== Politics ===
From 1998 to 2002, Gillespie was on the council of Hellam Township, Pennsylvania. In 2002, he was elected as a Republican to the Pennsylvania House of Representatives, representing the 47th district. He was re-elected to nine subsequent terms. Gillespie was made chair of House Game and Fisheries Committee in 2016. He was also designated as Pennsylvania's chairperson on the Chesapeake Bay Commission in 2022. In 2022, Gillespie was defeated in the primary election by Joe D'Orsie. His defeat came after earning the ire of rightwing Republicans who contended that he did not adequately oppose lockdown measures put in place during the COVID-19 pandemic. During the pandemic, Gillespie supported following CDC guidelines and stood by the response of Governor Tom Wolf's administration, though he later became critical of what businesses the governor deemed essential versus non-essential and the failure of the state's unemployment compensation system.
