= Roger Raymond Fischer =

American politician

Member of the Pennsylvania House of Representatives from the 47th district
- In office 1969–1988
- Preceded by: District created
- Succeeded by: Leo Trich

Member of the Pennsylvania House of Representatives from the Washington County district
- In office 1967–1968

Personal details
- Born: June 1, 1941 Washington, Pennsylvania
- Died: July 1, 2021 (aged 80) Washington, Pennsylvania
- Party: Republican

Roger Raymond Fischer (June 1, 1941 – July 1, 2021) was a Republican member of the Pennsylvania House of Representatives.

== Background ==
Born in the city of Washington, Pennsylvania on June 1, 1941, Fischer graduated from Washington High School in 1959, attended Thiel College, and then earned his Bachelor of Arts in math and physics from Washington and Jefferson College in 1963. After pursuing graduate studies at the Carnegie Institute of Technology, he then graduated from the United States Air Force Command and Staff College, and then earned his Master of Divinity from the Lutheran Theological Seminary and his Doctor of Ministry from the Pittsburgh Theological Seminary in 1998.

A second lieutenant in the United States Air Force, he then also served in the United States Air Force Reserves and Pennsylvania Air National Guard. Employed as a research engineer, he served on the board of directors for the Washington School District from 1965 to 1971. A Republican, he was elected to the Pennsylvania House of Representatives in 1966, and served ten consecutive terms, and then returned to professional as a minister.
