= Seven Gates of Hell =

Modern urban legend in York County, Pennsylvania

Coordinates: 40.039671°N 76.661692°W

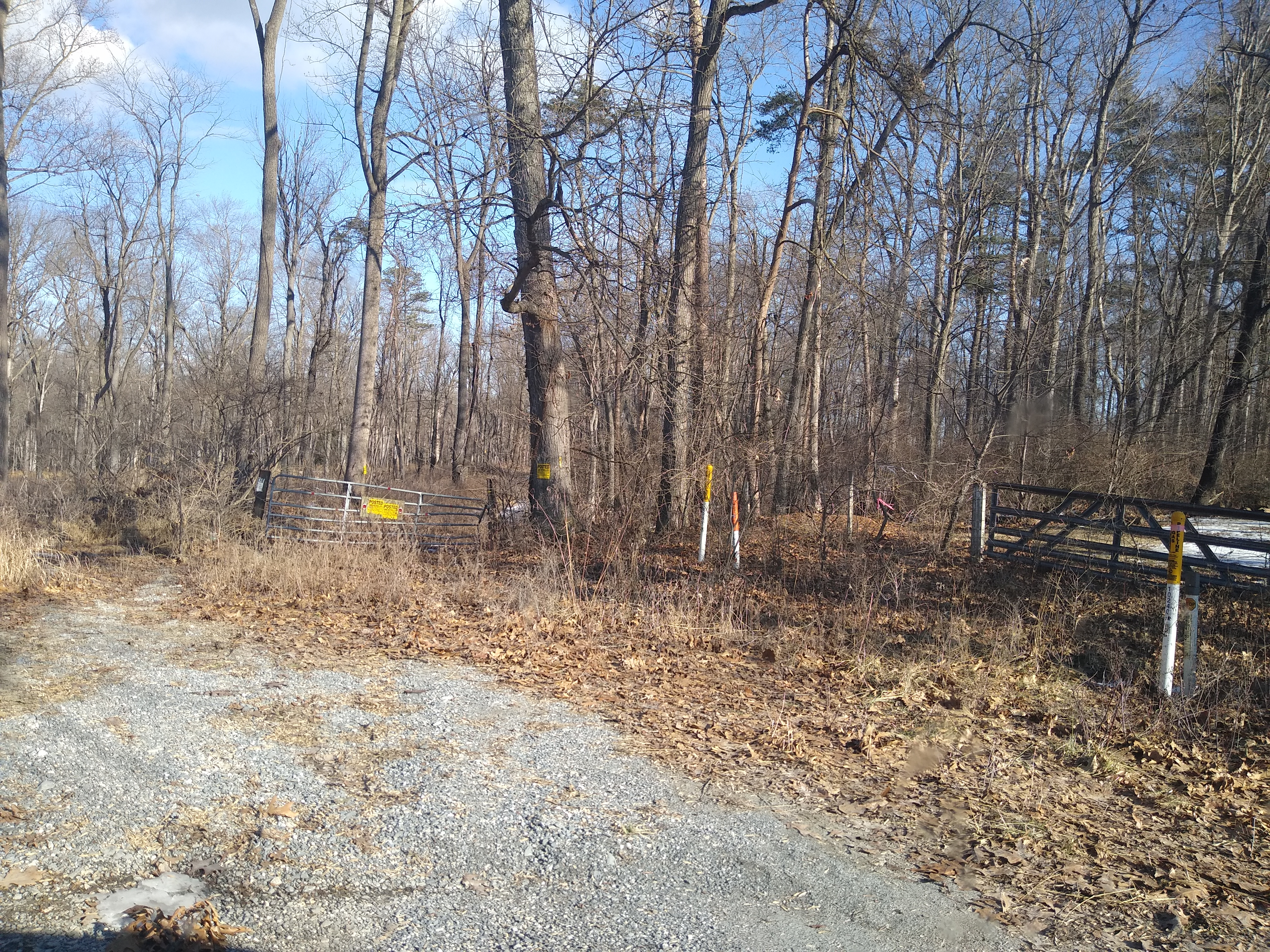
The gates on Toad Road, as they stand today

The Seven Gates of Hell is a modern urban legend regarding locations in York County, Pennsylvania. Two versions of the legend exist, one involving a burned insane asylum and the other an eccentric doctor. Both agree that there are seven gates in a wooded area of Hellam Township, Pennsylvania, and that anyone who passes through all seven goes straight to Hell. The location in question never housed an institution, while the doctor of the legend only constructed one gate to keep out trespassers. The property is privately owned, and visitors may be charged with trespassing.

== Myth ==
There are two popular versions of the myth, each with numerous variations. One states that a mental institution used to be located on either Toad Road or Trout Run Road in Hellam Township, Pennsylvania, depending on the source. It was erected in a remote location so as to isolate people deemed insane from the rest of the world. One day in the 1900s, a fire broke out and firefighters could not reach the hospital in time to save it due to its remoteness. Many patients died in the flames, while others escaped and were soon beaten to death. According to this version, the gates were put up by the local search party to trap the remaining inmates.

The second version states that an eccentric physician lived on the property and built several gates along a path deep into the forest. Both accounts agree that only one gate is visible during the day, but the other six can be seen at night. According to the legend, no one has ever passed the fifth gate, but if they passed all seven, they would go directly to Hell.

== Reality ==
There used to be a road in Hellam Township named Toad Road, but it was wiped off the map after Hurricane Agnes in 1972. Toad Road ran along the Codorus Creek and led to the Codorus Furnace. Today, there are multiple gates on this property that can be found alongside Range Road and end at the old intersection between Trout Run, Range, and Toad Road. All can be seen day or night, contrary to what the legend says. The dense wooded area known as Trout Run contains the ruins of a flint mill, possibly mistaken for a burned-down asylum.

This property is privately owned. Trespassers can be arrested and prosecuted.

The only detail to back up this myth is the fact that Dr. Harold Belknap was a practitioner at West Side Sanitarium who lived along Toad Road. Belknap would often make threatening signs for any trespassers with toad-related humor written on them, which was allegedly how the road got its name.

== Notoriety ==
The Seven Gates of Hell have received a fair amount of attention. Mike Argento wrote about it in the York Daily Record, and Matt Lake featured a section on the gates in his book, Weird Pennsylvania. Hellam Township published a page debunking the myths. Local resident Cheryl Englar reported a number of tourists searching for the gates, some harassing her and giving her cause to call the police.

== In media ==
Toad Road, a 2012 independent psychological horror film, makes use of the legend.
