= Hellam Township, Pennsylvania =

Township in Pennsylvania, US

Coordinates: 40°02′00″N 76°37′59″W

- Township
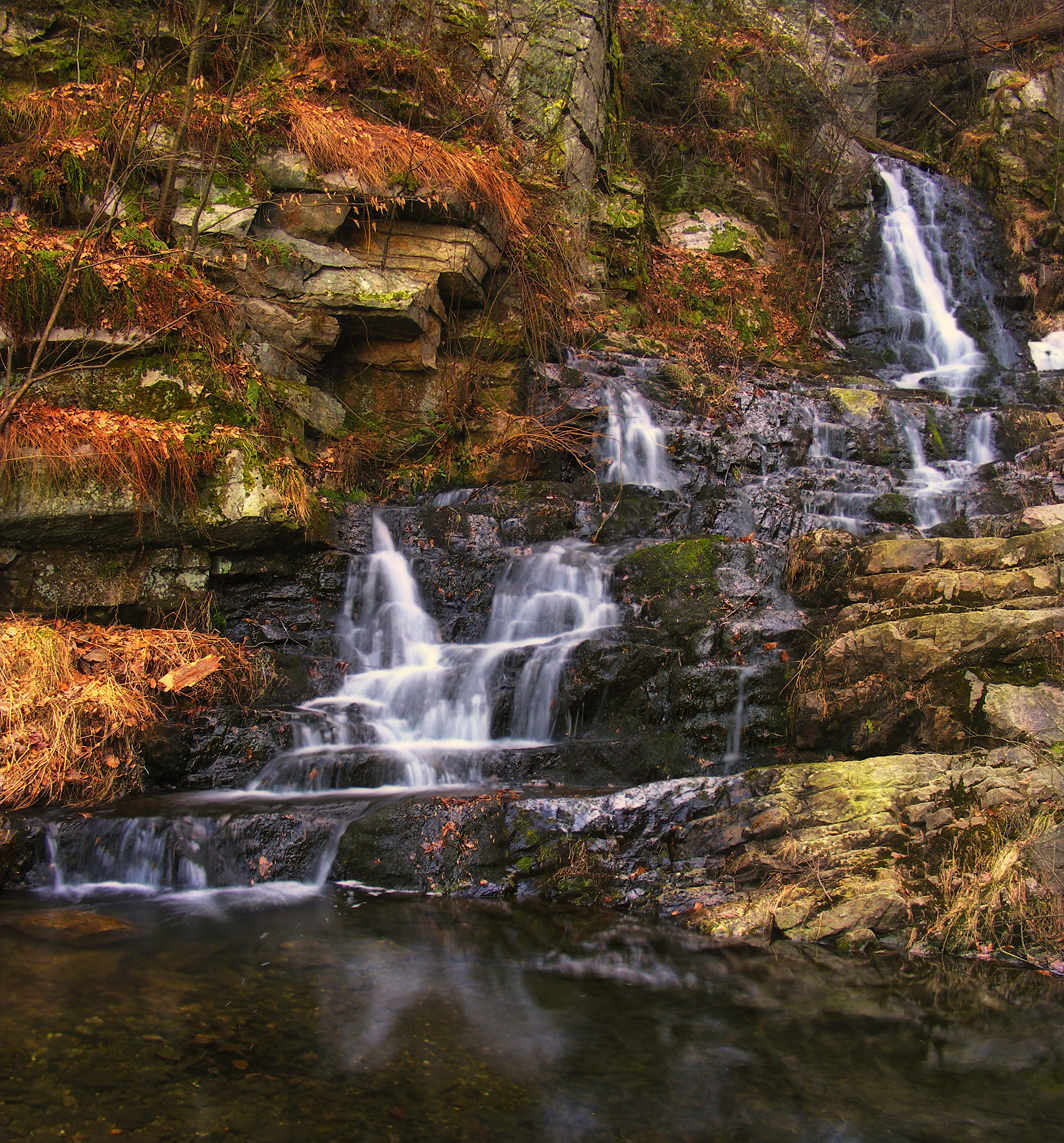
- Wildcat Falls near the Susquehanna River in Hellam Township

- Location in York County and the state of Pennsylvania.
- Country: United States
- State: Pennsylvania
- County: York
- Settled: 1721
- Incorporated: 1739

Government
  - Type: Board of Supervisors

Area
  - Total: 28.23 sq mi (73.11 km^{2})
  - Land: 28.20 sq mi (73.05 km^{2})
  - Water: 0.027 sq mi (0.07 km^{2})

Population (2020)
  - Total: 5,939 ▼
  - Estimate (2023): 5,928
  - Density: 213/sq mi (82.1/km^{2})
- Time zone: UTC-5 (Eastern (EST))
  - Summer (DST): UTC-4 (EDT)
- Area code: 717
- State government
  - Senator (Dist 28): Kristin Phillips-Hill, since 2019
  - House Rep (47): Keith J. Gillespie, since 2003
- U.S. government
  - House Rep (11): Lloyd Smucker, since 2019
- FIPS code: 42-133-33728
- Website: www.hellamtownship.com

Historical population
Census	Pop.	Note	%±
1850	1,528		—
1860	1,642		7.5%
1870	1,639		−0.2%
1880	1,963		19.8%
1890	2,164		10.2%
1900	2,057		−4.9%
1910	1,687		−18.0%
1920	1,520		−9.9%
1930	1,600		5.3%
1940	1,765		10.3%
1950	2,081		17.9%
1960	2,550		22.5%
1970	3,147		23.4%
1980	4,507		43.2%
1990	5,128		13.8%
2000	5,930		15.6%
2010	6,043		1.9%
2020	5,939		−1.7%
2023 (est.)	5,928		−0.2%
U.S. Decennial Census

Hellam Township is a township in York County, Pennsylvania. The population was 5,939 at the 2020 census. It was founded in 1739 as the first township in the area, and it originally included the entirety of modern York and Adams counties. Fire department services are provided jointly by the Hallam and Wrightsville fire departments.

== History ==
The Mifflin House, an Underground Railroad site in the township dating to the 1700s, was used by the Mifflin family in the 19th century to "hide freedom-seekers and ferry them across the Susquehanna River on their way to Philadelphia." The house was sold into the Huber family in 1856, who sold it to the Blessing family in 1959. As of May 2017, the property was at risk of demolition for development of a business park. By December 2017, a funding campaign was started to help pay for a legal challenge to save the property, reportedly eligible to be listed on the National Register of Historic Places. In July 2018, a York County Court of Common Pleas judge ruled in favor of a township zoning officer's decision (and zoning hearing board's support) to deny a demolition permit for the house. The developer appealed the decision to the Commonwealth Court. In February 2019, township supervisors approved unanimously a subdivision plan that includes a two-year moratorium on development of more than 60 acres (240,000 m^{2}) surrounding Mifflin House, to give preservationists time to raise enough money to save it.

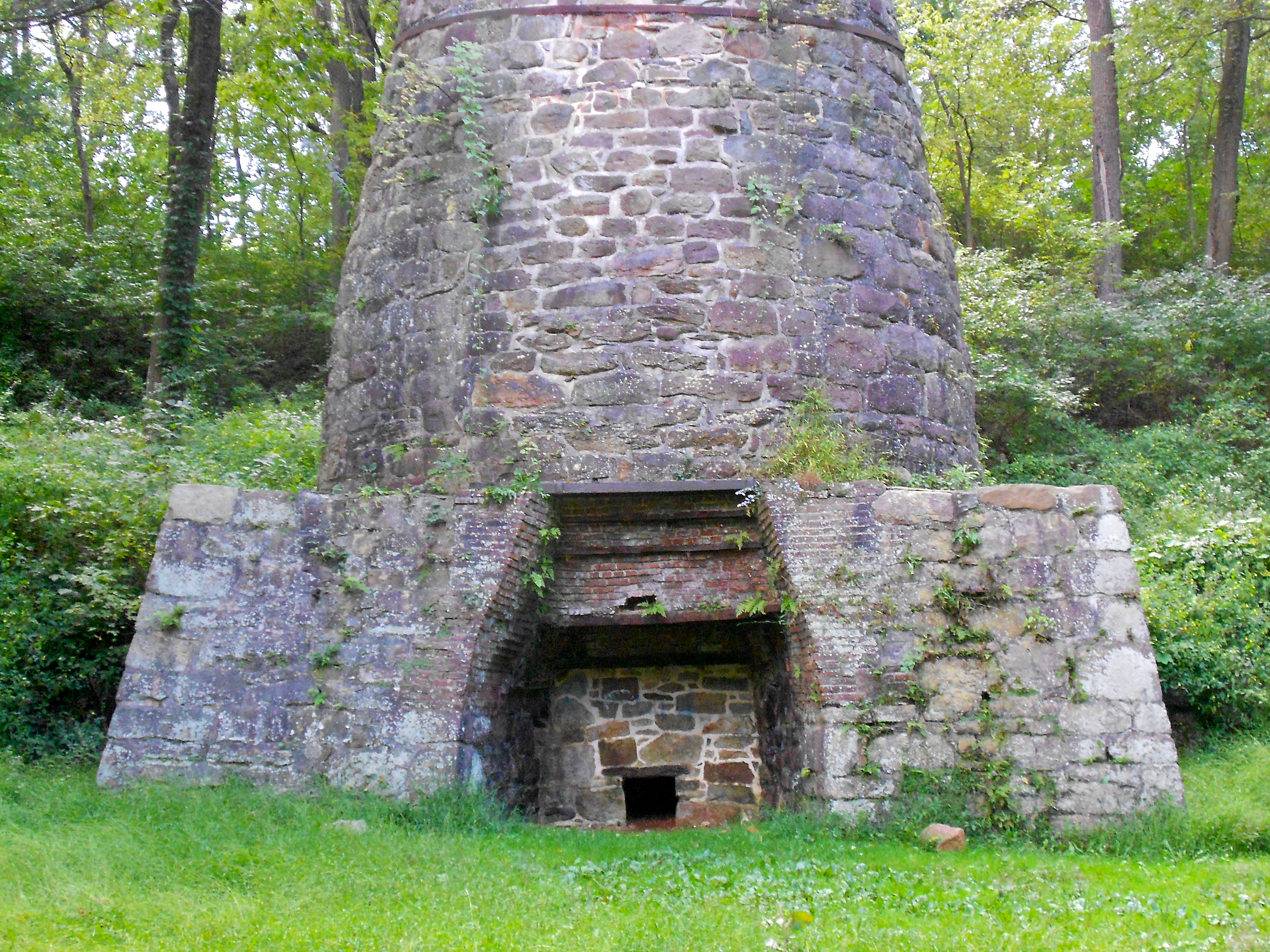
Codorus Forge and Furnace Historic District, which dates to 1765, was listed on the National Register of Historic Places in 1991.

== Geography ==
According to the United States Census Bureau, the township has a total area of 27.7 square miles (72 km^{2}), of which 0.04 square miles (0.10 km^{2}), or 0.14%, is water.

== Demographics ==
As of the census of 2000, there were 5,930 people, 2,395 households, and 1,726 families residing in the township. The population density was 214.3 inhabitants per square mile (82.7/km^{2}). There were 2,538 housing units at an average density of 91.7 per square mile (35.4/km^{2}). The racial makeup of the township was 97.81% White, 0.74% African American, 0.03% Native American, 0.34% Asian, 0.03% Pacific Islander, 0.19% from other races, and 0.86% from two or more races. Hispanic or Latino of any race were 0.93% of the population.

There were 2,395 households, out of which 29.0% had children under the age of 18 living with them, 62.0% were married couples living together, 6.5% had a female householder with no husband present, and 27.9% were non-families. 21.6% of all households were made up of individuals, and 7.6% had someone living alone who was 65 years of age or older. The average household size was 2.46 and the average family size was 2.87.

In the township the population was spread out, with 22.9% under the age of 18, 5.3% from 18 to 24, 31.4% from 25 to 44, 28.2% from 45 to 64, and 12.1% who were 65 years of age or older. The median age was 40 years. For every 100 females, there were 100.9 males. For every 100 females age 18 and over, there were 99.7 males.

The median income for a household in the township was $49,750, and the median income for a family was $55,700. Males had a median income of $40,000 versus $28,558 for females. The per capita income for the township was $22,345. About 3.6% of families and 5.8% of the population were below the poverty line, including 9.1% of those under age 18 and 5.8% of those age 65 or over.

== Education ==
Hellam Township is served by the Eastern York School District.

Before 1950, education in the township was provided in small schoolhouses, most of them having only one room. These schools included:

- Beidler's
- Burnt Cabin
- Druck Valley
- Furnace
- Hallam
- Hauser's
- Highmount
- Kinard's
- Kreutz Creek, owned by Mahlon Haines in 1951
- Levergood's
- Musser's
- Pine Swamp
- Rudy's
- Strickler's
- Tracey's
- Wrightsville

== Notable people ==
- Keith J. Gillespie, state representative for District 47 from 2003 to 2022
- Jon Witman, former football player with Penn State and the Pittsburgh Steelers
- John Wright, a colonial-era businessman who established Wright's Ferry and after whom the Wrightsville borough is named

== Urban legends ==
Hellam Township is the supposed location of the Seven Gates of Hell. According to urban legend a road leads through several "gates," some of which are real while most are invisible, the seventh being the entrance to Hell.

== See also ==
- Hallam, Pennsylvania, including an origin of the name
- William C. Goodridge, active in the Underground Railroad in York city
