= Codorus Forge and Furnace Historic District =

Historic district in Pennsylvania, United States

- U.S. National Register of Historic Places
- U.S. Historic district
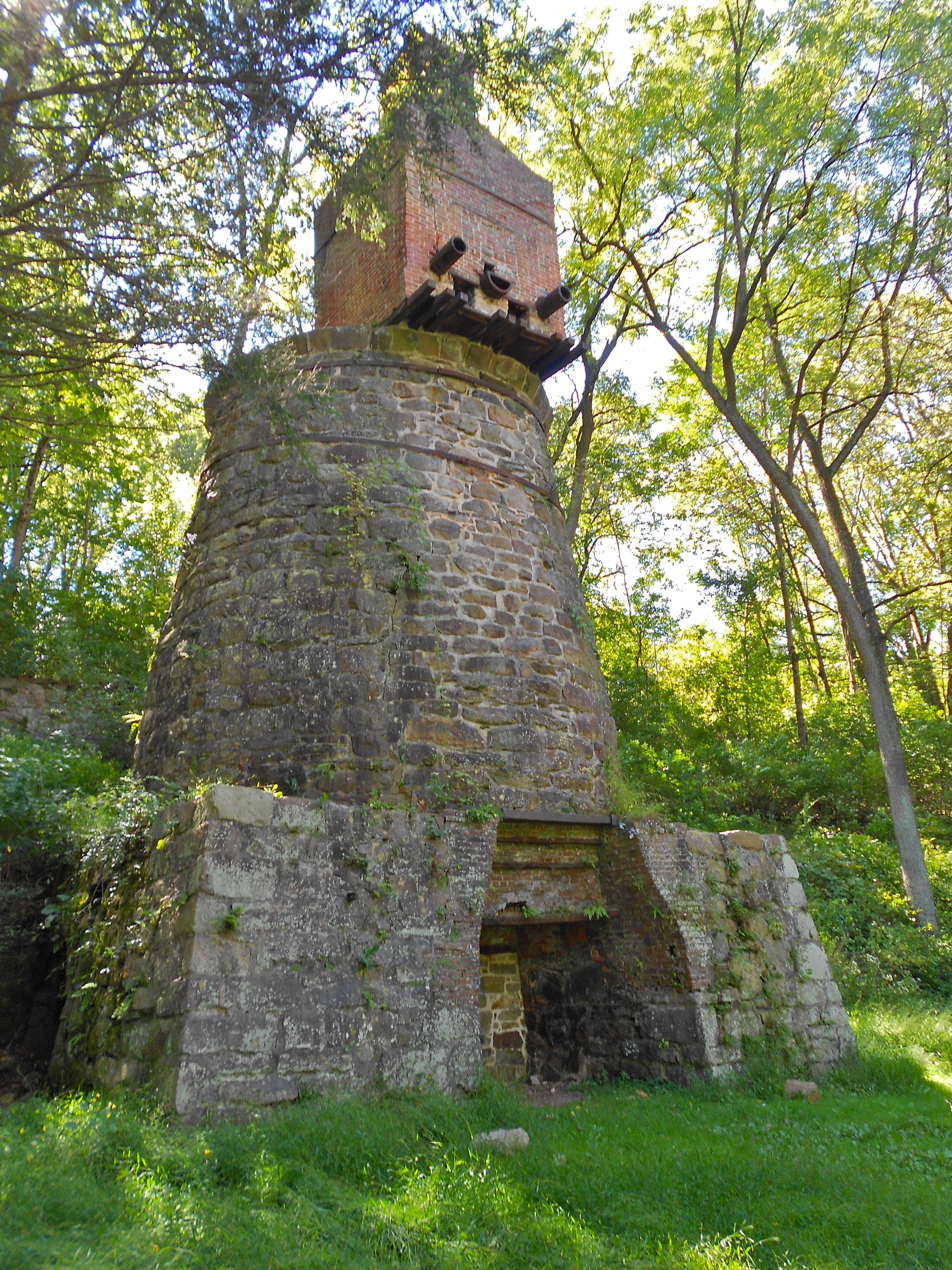
- Overview of the blast furnace

- Location within Pennsylvania Location within the United States
- Location: Junction of River Farm and Furnace Roads, southeast of Saginaw, Hellam Township, Pennsylvania
- Coordinates: 40°3′5″N 76°39′26″W
- Area: 7 acres (2.8 ha)
- Built: 1765
- Architectural style: Iron furnace
- MPS: Iron and Steel Resources of Pennsylvania MPS
- NRHP reference No.: 91001132
- Added to NRHP: September 6, 1991

Codorus Forge and Furnace Historic District, also known as Hellem (Hellam) Forge, is a historic iron forge and national historic district located at Hellam Township in York County, Pennsylvania. The district includes four contributing buildings, one contributing site, and one contributing structure. The contributing buildings are the iron furnace (c. 1836), charcoal house (c. 1836), ruins of works' houses (c. 1836), ironmaster's house and furnace office (c. 1780), privy, forge (1800), and ruins of unknown structures. The furnace is constructed of stone with a base that is 30 feet wide 30 feet deep and 12 feet high. The full height of the furnace is approximately 30 feet. One top of the furnace are the partial remains of a brick hot blast stove. The ironmaster's house is a 2 1/2-story, stuccoed stone building, nine bays wide and one room deep. The Hellem (Hellam) Forge was first established in 1765.

It was listed on the National Register of Historic Places in 1991.

The Codorus Furnace is currently owned and maintained by the Conservation Society of York County. The organization is conducting a campaign to restore and reinforce the structure, as well as the nearby charcoal house foundation. In 2023 and 2024, an Eagle Scout project by a Scout from Dover, PA was completed which added steps and safety railings that added accessibility to the trails behind the furnace, which lead to the charcoal house and into the Susquehanna Riverlands State Park.
