= Hallam, Pennsylvania =

Borough in Pennsylvania, US

- Borough
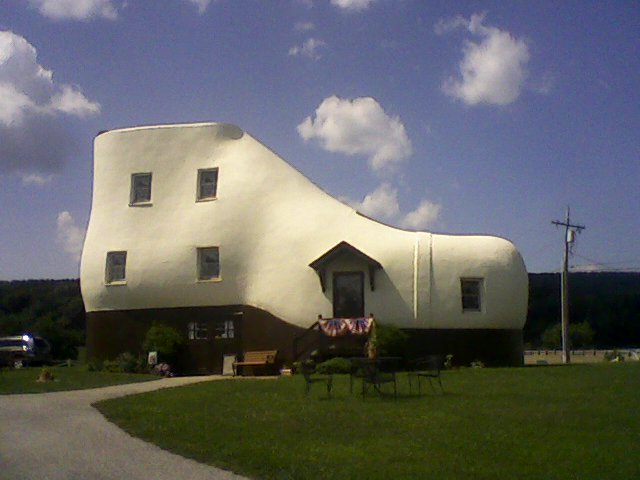
- Haines Shoe House

- Location in York County and the U.S. state of Pennsylvania.

- Location of Hallam in Pennsylvania Hallam (the United States)
- Coordinates: 40°00′14″N 76°36′16″W
- Country: United States
- State: Pennsylvania
- County: York
- Settled: 1770
- Incorporated: 1902

Government
  - Type: Borough Council
  - Mayor: Nick Troutman

Area
  - Total: 0.67 sq mi (1.73 km^{2})
  - Land: 0.67 sq mi (1.73 km^{2})
  - Water: 0 sq mi (0.00 km^{2})
- Elevation: 341 ft (104 m)

Population (2020)
  - Total: 2,777
  - Estimate (2023): 2,774
  - Density: 4,163.6/sq mi (1,607.58/km^{2})
- Time zone: UTC-5 (Eastern (EST))
  - Summer (DST): UTC-4 (EDT)
- ZIP code: 17406
- Area code: 717
- FIPS code: 42-32056
- Website: www.hallamborough.com

Hallam (/ˈhɛləm/ HEL-əm) is a borough in York County, Pennsylvania, United States. The population was 2,777 at the 2020 census. It is part of the York–Hanover metropolitan area.

== History ==
Before 1736, all parts of Pennsylvania west of the Susquehanna River, including present-day Hallam Borough and the surrounding Hellam Township, were land of the Iroquois.

In October 1736, the Proprietors of Pennsylvania received from the Five Nations deeds for the Susquehanna lands south of the Blue Mountains, including the borough and township.

From 1736 to 1739, the area was under the authority of Hempfield Township in Lancaster County east of the Susquehanna. In 1739, the Provincial Assembly passed a special act to empower Lancaster County to establish townships west of the river. Hellam Township was created and included most of what is now York, Adams and Cumberland counties. Hellam Township was named after Hallamshire, the township in England where Samuel Blunston, the magistrate of Lancaster County, was born.

When Hallam Borough was incorporated in 1902, the town's name was spelled Hallam, the same as the English township.

The Martin Schultz House was listed on the National Register of Historic Places in 1993.

== Geography ==
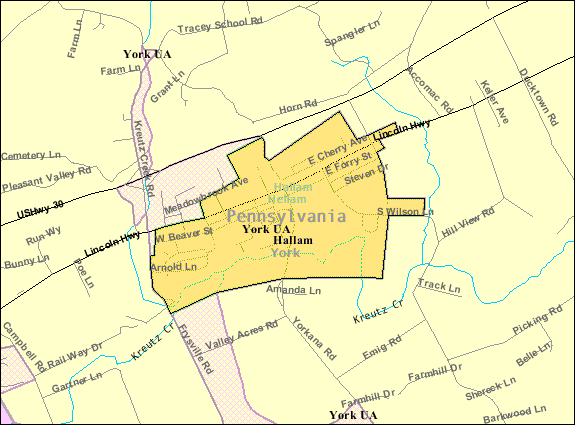
Map of Hallam

Hallam is located at 40°0′14″N 76°36′16″W (40.003897, -76.604528). It is a suburb of York and is part of the York-Hanover Metropolitan Statistical Area, as well as the York-Hanover-Gettysburg Combined Statistical Area.

According to the United States Census Bureau, the borough has a total area of 0.7 square miles (1.8 km^{2}), all land.

Hallam is located within the Kreutz Creek watershed.

=== Climate ===
Hallam lies on the cusp of a humid subtropical climate zone and experiences four discernible seasons. It receives an average of 43 inches (1,100 mm) of precipitation each year, with the wettest month being June. In January 1994, Hallam experienced its lowest recorded temperature at -21 °F, while the hottest temperature on record was 105 °F in July 1936.

Climate data for Hallam, PA
Month	Jan	Feb	Mar	Apr	May	Jun	Jul	Aug	Sep	Oct	Nov	Dec	Year
Mean daily maximum °F (°C)	39 (4)	43 (6)	53 (12)	65 (18)	75 (24)	83 (28)	87 (31)	85 (29)	78 (26)	67 (19)	54 (12)	43 (6)	64 (18)
Mean daily minimum °F (°C)	21 (−6)	23 (−5)	31 (−1)	39 (4)	49 (9)	58 (14)	63 (17)	61 (16)	54 (12)	42 (6)	34 (1)	26 (−3)	42 (5)
Average precipitation inches (mm)	3.44 (87)	2.77 (70)	3.65 (93)	3.52 (89)	4.26 (108)	4.31 (109)	3.75 (95)	3.33 (85)	4.1 (100)	3.16 (80)	3.47 (88)	3.24 (82)	43 (1,086)
Source: The Weather Channel

== Demographics ==
Historical population
Census	Pop.	Note	%±
1910	472		—
1920	492		4.2%
1930	771		56.7%
1940	799		3.6%
1950	976		22.2%
1960	1,234		26.4%
1970	1,825		47.9%
1980	1,428		−21.8%
1990	1,375		−3.7%
2000	1,532		11.4%
2010	2,673		74.5%
2020	2,775		3.8%
2023 (est.)	2,774	▼	0.0%

As of the census of 2000, there were 1,532 people, 667 households, and 450 families residing in the borough. The population density was 2,182.5 inhabitants per square mile (842.7/km^{2}). There were 713 housing units at an average density of 1,015.7 per square mile (392.2/km^{2}). The racial makeup of the borough was 96.21% White, 1.31% African American, 0.39% Native American, 0.59% Asian, 0.85% from other races, and 0.65% from two or more races. Hispanic or Latino of any race were 1.31% of the population.

There were 667 households, out of which 29.2% had children under the age of 18 living with them, 54.6% were married couples living together, 9.6% had a female householder with no husband present, and 32.4% were non-families. 25.9% of all households were made up of individuals, and 9.4% had someone living alone who was 65 years of age or older. The average household size was 2.30 and the average family size was 2.76.

In the borough the population was spread out, with 22.3% under the age of 18, 8.0% from 18 to 24, 30.8% from 25 to 44, 24.0% from 45 to 64, and 14.9% who were 65 years of age or older. The median age was 37 years. For every 100 females there were 97.9 males. For every 100 females age 18 and over, there were 92.4 males.

The median income for a household in the borough was $42,235, and the median income for a family was $47,552. Males had a median income of $34,773 versus $24,716 for females. The per capita income for the borough was $22,868. About 5.0% of families and 4.6% of the population were below the poverty line, including 5.1% of those under age 18 and 6.7% of those age 65 or over.

== Education ==
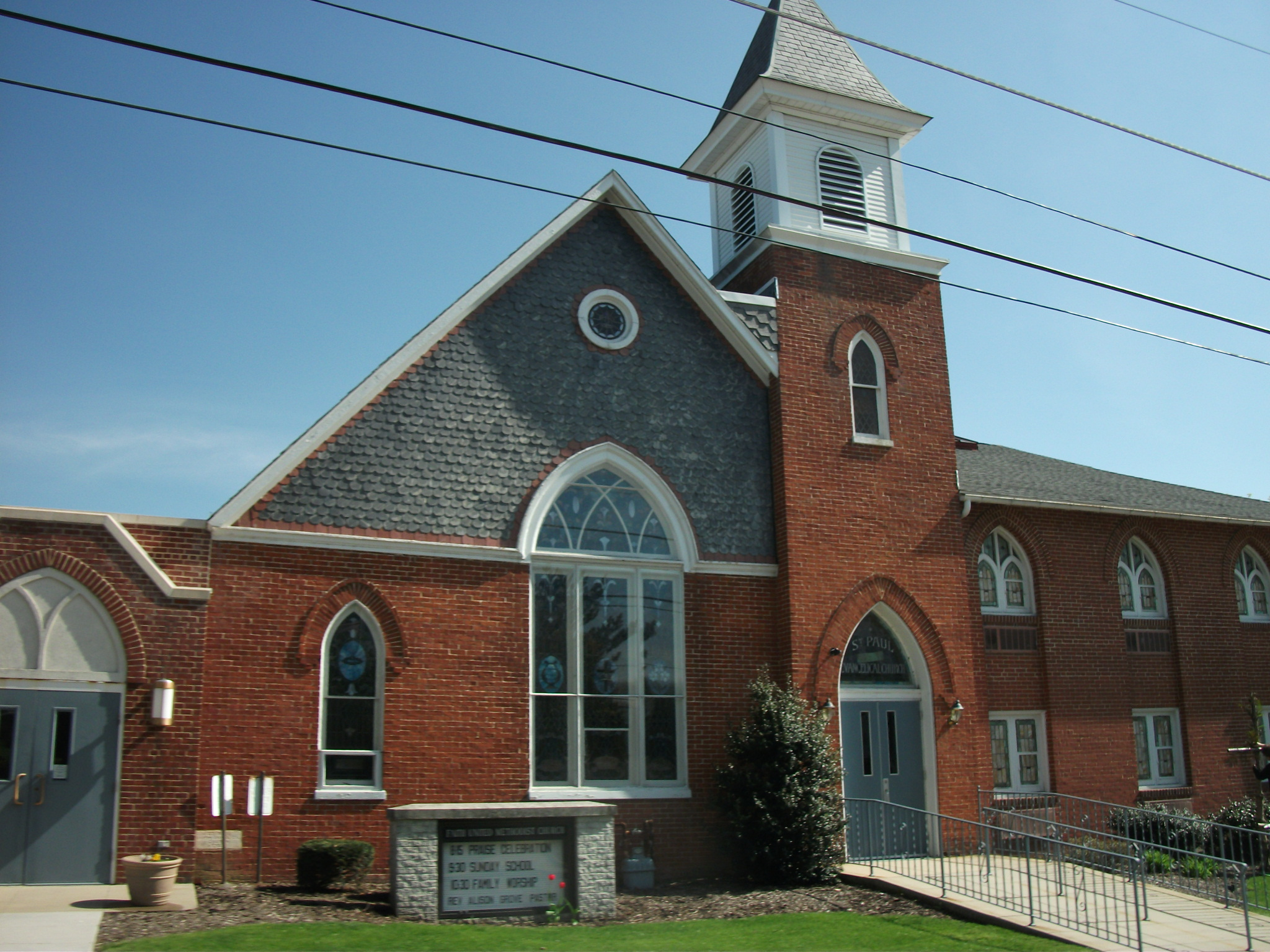
Hallam United Methodist Church

The Hallam Borough is served by the Eastern York School District. Students in Hallam attend Kreutz Creek Elementary School if they are in grades K–5, Eastern York Middle School in 6–8, and Eastern York High School in 9–12.
