= Conewago Township, York County, Pennsylvania =

Township in Pennsylvania, US

Coordinates: 40°05′00″N 76°44′58″W

- Township
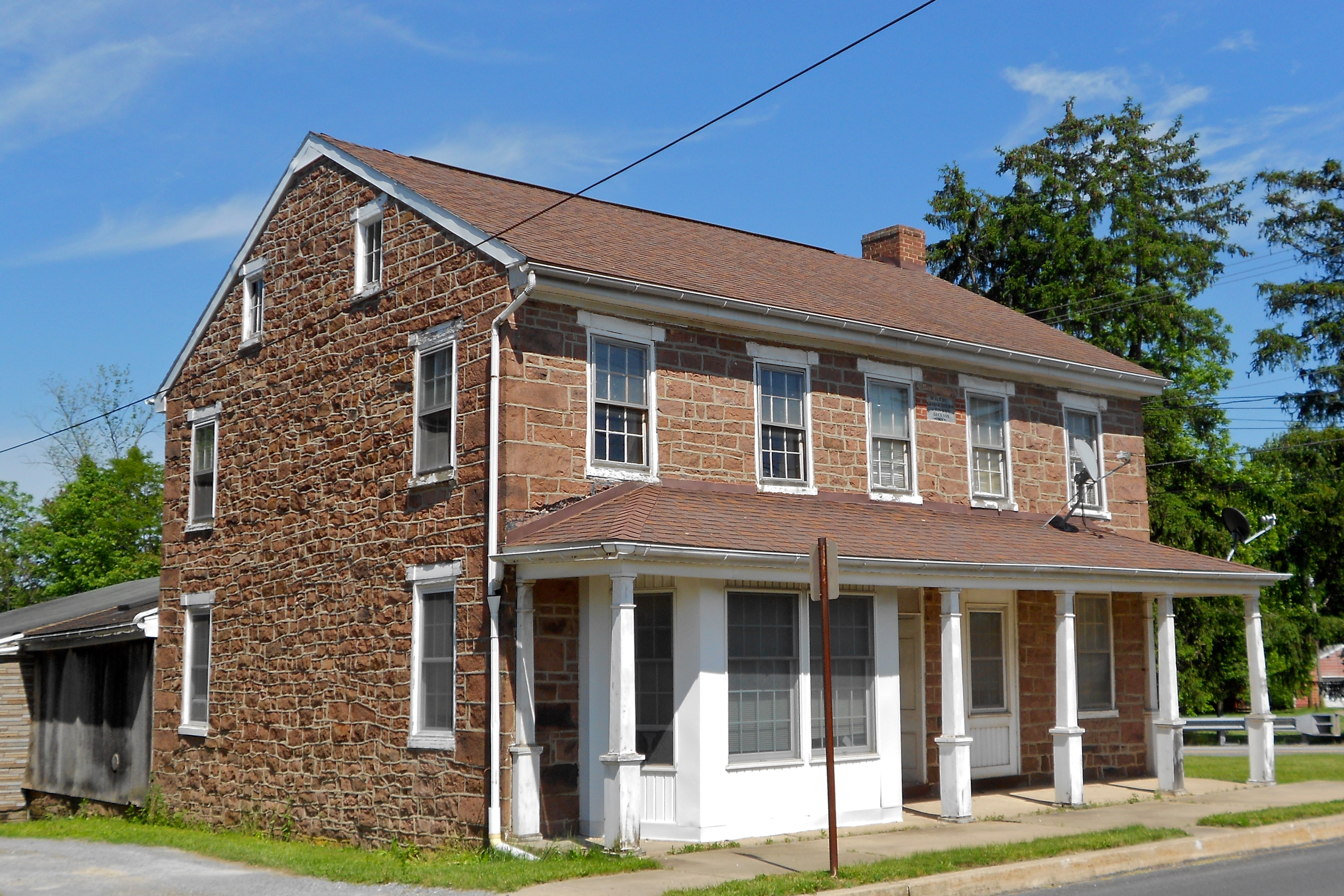
- House in Strinestown

- Location in York County and the state of Pennsylvania.
- Country: United States
- State: Pennsylvania
- County: York
- Settled: 1767
- Incorporated: 1818

Government
  - Type: Board of Supervisors

Area
  - Total: 24.61 sq mi (63.75 km^{2})
  - Land: 24.44 sq mi (63.29 km^{2})
  - Water: 0.18 sq mi (0.46 km^{2})

Population (2020)
  - Total: 8,532
  - Estimate (2023): 8,821
  - Density: 329.4/sq mi (127.19/km^{2})
- Time zone: UTC-5 (Eastern (EST))
  - Summer (DST): UTC-4 (EDT)
- Area code: 717
- FIPS code: 42-133-15656
- Website: www.conewagotwp.com

Historical population
Census	Pop.	Note	%±
1850	1,270		—
1860	1,277		0.6%
1870	1,382		8.2%
1880	1,495		8.2%
1890	1,555		4.0%
1900	1,506		−3.2%
1910	1,460		−3.1%
1920	1,396		−4.4%
1930	1,598		14.5%
1940	1,776		11.1%
1950	1,877		5.7%
1960	2,992		59.4%
1970	3,719		24.3%
1980	4,979		33.9%
1990	4,997		0.4%
2000	5,278		5.6%
2010	7,510		42.3%
2020	8,532		13.6%
2023 (est.)	8,821		3.4%
U.S. Decennial Census

Conewago Township is a township in York County, Pennsylvania, United States. The township encompasses the land between the Conewago Creek and the Little Conewago Creek, west of their conjunction. The township was formed in 1818 from the northeastern portion of Dover Township and the southeastern portion of Newberry Township and consists of approximately 11,000 acres. The population was 8,532 at the 2020 census.

In the Iroquois language, "Conewago" (or "Conewaugha") means “at the place of the rapids.”

== Geography ==
According to the United States Census Bureau, the township has a total area of 24.7 square miles (64 km^{2}), of which 24.4 square miles (63 km^{2}) is land and 0.2 square miles (0.52 km^{2}), or 0.93%, is water.

== Demographics ==
As of the census of 2000, there were 5,278 people, 2,005 households, and 1,499 families residing in the township. The population density was 216.1 inhabitants per square mile (83.4/km^{2}). There were 2,113 housing units at an average density of 86.5 units per square mile (33.4 units/km^{2}). The racial makeup of the township was 97.21% White, 1.35% African American, 0.17% Native American, 0.27% Asian, 0.15% from other races, and 0.85% from two or more races. Hispanic or Latino of any race were 0.66% of the population.

There were 2,005 households, out of which 33.3% had children under the age of 18 living with them, 60.8% were married couples living together, 8.6% had a female householder with no husband present, and 25.2% were non-families. 19.4% of all households were made up of individuals, and 5.4% had someone living alone who was 65 years of age or older. The average household size was 2.59 and the average family size was 2.95.

In the township the population was spread out, with 25.1% under the age of 18, 7.0% from 18 to 24, 32.4% from 25 to 44, 25.4% from 45 to 64, and 10.1% who were 65 years of age or older. The median age was 38 years. For every 100 females, there were 101.1 males. For every 100 females age 18 and over, there were 100.4 males.

The median income for a household in the township was $42,688, and the median income for a family was $44,856. Males had a median income of $34,198 versus $22,420 for females. The per capita income for the township was $17,703. About 1.9% of families and 4.5% of the population were below the poverty line, including 3.7% of those under age 18 and 2.9% of those age 65 or over.

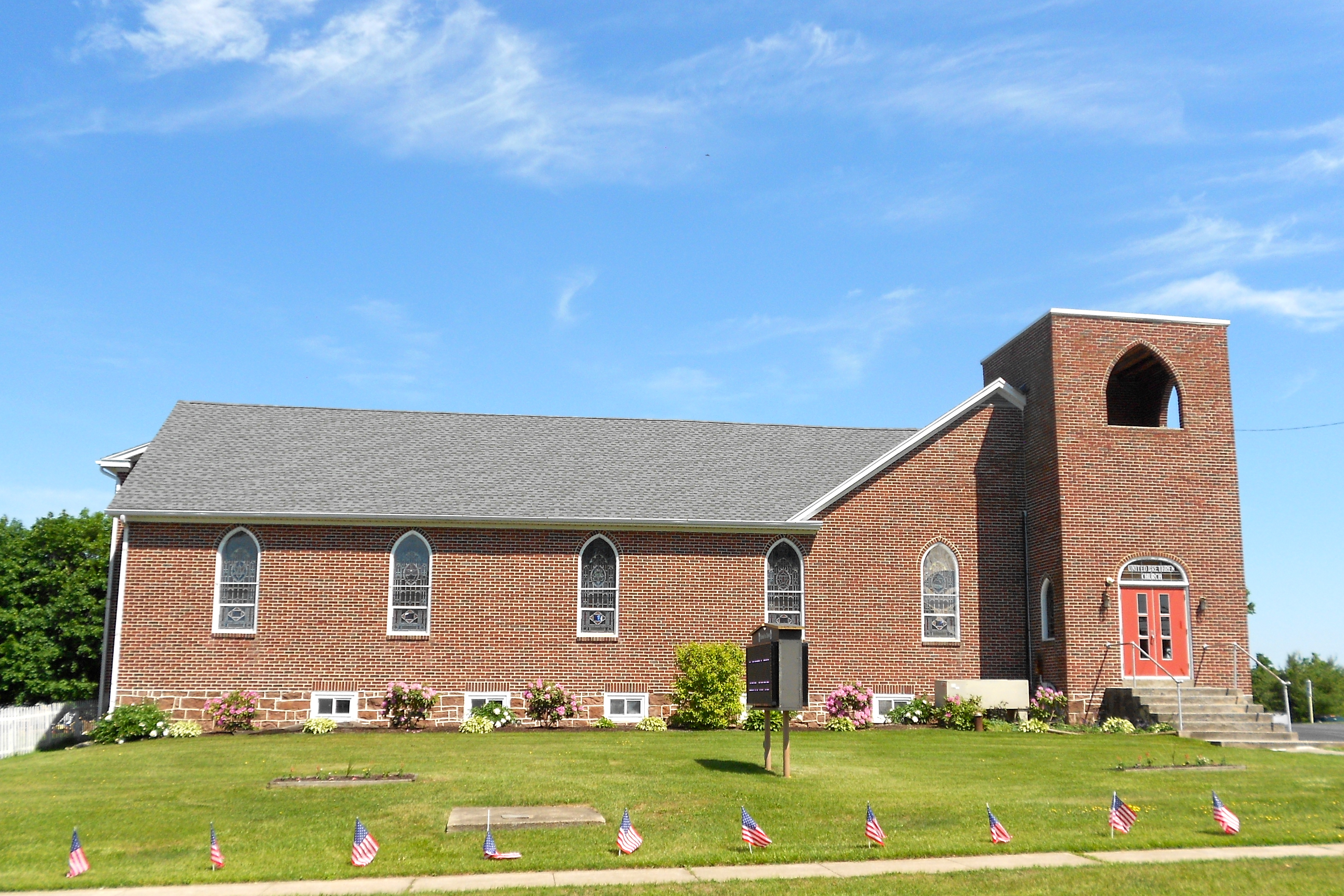
United Brethren Church near Strinestown

== Education ==
Conewago Township is served by the Northeastern York School District.
