= Mount Wolf, Pennsylvania =

Borough in Pennsylvania, US

- Borough
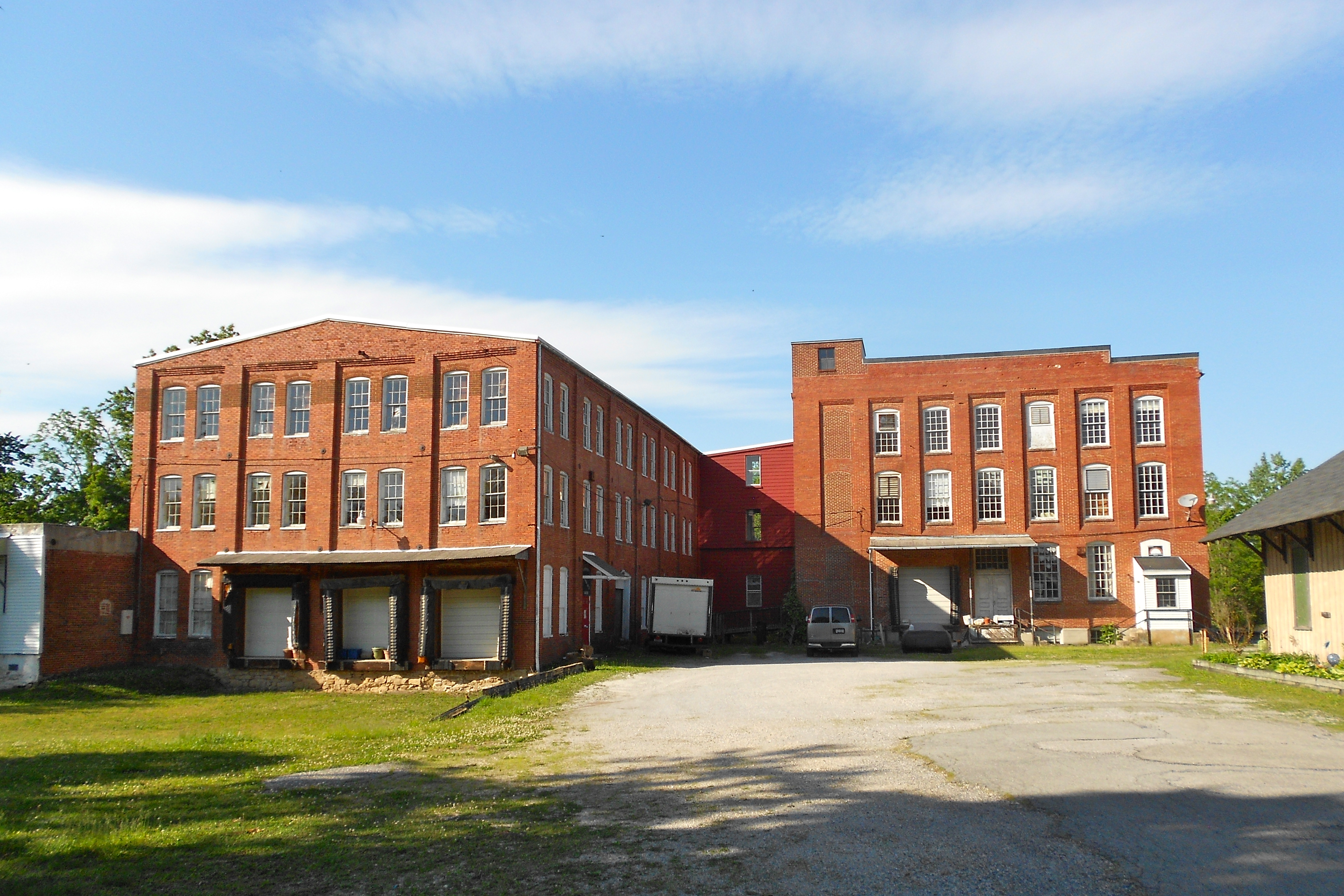
- Warehouses by the depot

- Location in York County and the U.S. state of Pennsylvania.

- Location of Mount Wolf in Pennsylvania Mount Wolf (the United States)
- Coordinates: 40°03′46″N 76°42′20″W
- Country: United States
- State: Pennsylvania
- County: York
- Settled: 1867
- Incorporated: 1910

Government
  - Type: Borough Council
  - Mayor: Josh Parish

Area
  - Total: 0.53 sq mi (1.36 km^{2})
  - Land: 0.53 sq mi (1.36 km^{2})
  - Water: 0 sq mi (0.00 km^{2})
- Elevation: 374 ft (114 m)

Population (2020)
  - Total: 1,368
  - Density: 2,609.5/sq mi (1,007.54/km^{2})
- Time zone: UTC-5 (Eastern (EST))
  - Summer (DST): UTC-4 (EDT)
- Zip code: 17347
- Area code: 717
- FIPS code: 42-52056
- Website: Mount Wolf Borough website

Mount Wolf is a borough in York County, Pennsylvania, United States. The population was 1,367 at the 2020 census. It is part of the York–Hanover metropolitan area.

== History ==
In the area later to become Mount Wolf, the earliest recorded land deeds were dated 1746. Around 1850, the York and Cumberland Railroad decided to locate a station between Emigsville, Liverpool (now Manchester) and New Holland (now Saginaw). The station was named Mount Campbell in honor of Thomas Campbell, who was instrumental in urging completion of the railway to Harrisburg. In the late 1850s, the station and post office became known as Mount Wolf in honor of George H. Wolf, who was the stationmaster, postmaster, and owner of a local store and warehouse.

Mount Wolf became incorporated as a self-governing borough on August 23, 1910. A mayor and a six-member council govern it.

In April 2011, the Mount Wolf Centennial Committee received second-place recognition in the 2011 Borough News Municipal Website contest for the population category under 2,500 from the Pennsylvania State Association of Boroughs. In September 2011, the Mount Wolf Centennial Committee received the "Community Award - Government/Civic Organization", at the annual board meeting of the York County Heritage Trust.

Tom Wolf, who served as Governor of Pennsylvania from 2015 to 2023, is from Mount Wolf and is a descendant of George H. Wolf.

== Geography ==
Mount Wolf is located at 40°3′46″N 76°42′20″W (40.062794, -76.705587).

According to the United States Census Bureau, the borough has a total area of 0.5 square mile (1.4 km^{2}), all land.

== Demographics ==
Historical population
Census	Pop.	Note	%±
1880	148		—
1920	688		—
1930	999		45.2%
1940	970		−2.9%
1950	1,164		20.0%
1960	1,514		30.1%
1970	1,811		19.6%
1980	1,517		−16.2%
1990	1,365		−10.0%
2000	1,373		0.6%
2010	1,393		1.5%
2020	1,368		−1.8%
2021 (est.)	1,363	▼	−0.4%

As of the census of 2000, there were 1,373 people, 548 households, and 396 families residing in the borough. The population density was 2,530.6 inhabitants per square mile (977.1/km^{2}). There were 570 housing units at an average density of 1,050.6 per square mile (405.6/km^{2}). The racial makeup of the borough was 97.01% White, 1.24% African American, 0.15% Native American, 0.22% Asian, 0.22% from other races, and 1.17% from two or more races. Hispanic or Latino of any race were 1.60% of the population.

There were 548 households, out of which 28.5% had children under the age of 18 living with them, 56.8% were married couples living together, 10.9% had a female householder with no husband present, and 27.6% were non-families. 23.2% of all households were made up of individuals, and 11.5% had someone living alone who was 65 years of age or older. The average household size was 2.44 and the average family size was 2.85.

The borough's population distribution by age was as follows: 24.4% under the age of 18 years, 7.1% from 18 to 24 years, 29.3% from 25 to 44 years, 22.2% from 45 to 64 years, and 17.0% 65 years of age or older. The median age was 40 years. For every 100 females there were 92.6 males. For every 100 females age 18 and over, there were 90.5 males.

The median income for a household in the borough was $42,135, and the median income for a family was $47,813. Males had a median income of $35,268 versus $25,859 for females. The per capita income for the borough was $19,760. About 2.5% of families and 4.7% of the population were below the poverty line, including 2.1% of those under age 18 and 3.1% of those age 65 or over.

== Education ==
Mount Wolf is served by the Northeastern York School District.
