= Manchester, Pennsylvania =

Borough in Pennsylvania, US

- Borough
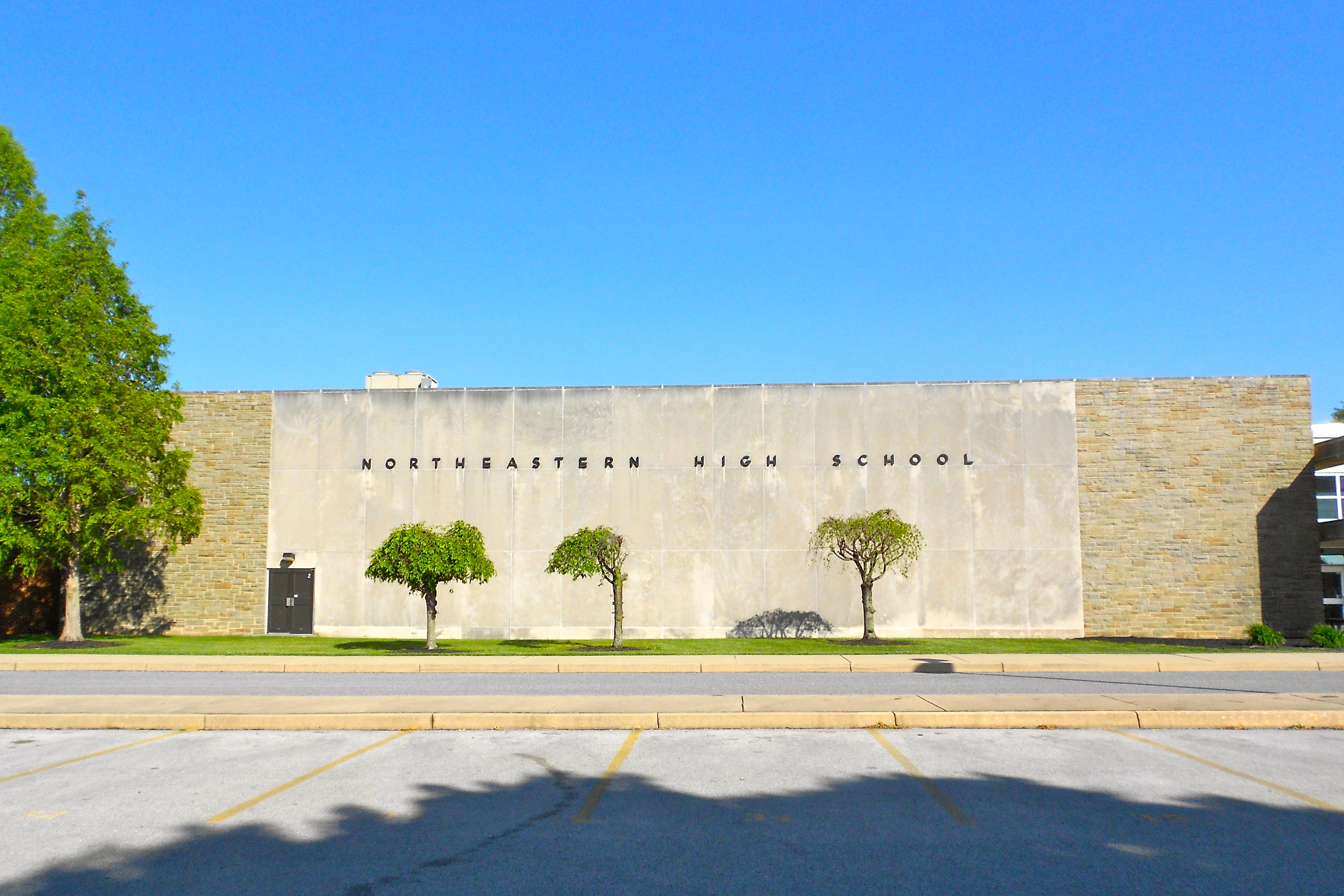
- Northeastern High School

- Location in York County and the U.S. state of Pennsylvania.

- Location of Manchester in Pennsylvania Manchester (the United States)
- Coordinates: 40°03′39″N 76°43′11″W
- Country: United States
- State: Pennsylvania
- County: York
- Settled: 1814
- Incorporated: 1869

Government
  - Type: Borough Council
  - Mayor: Judy Vance
  - Council President: Bradford A. Price
  - Council Vice President: Jeffrey Gerwertz

Area
  - Total: 0.77 sq mi (2.00 km^{2})
  - Land: 0.77 sq mi (2.00 km^{2})
  - Water: 0 sq mi (0.00 km^{2})
- Elevation: 453 ft (138 m)

Population (2020)
  - Total: 2,800
  - Density: 3,621/sq mi (1,397.9/km^{2})
- Time zone: UTC-5 (Eastern (EST))
  - Summer (DST): UTC-4 (EDT)
- Zip code: 17345
- Area code: 717
- FIPS code: 42-46864
- Website: manchesterborough.gov

Manchester is a borough in York County, Pennsylvania, United States. The population was 2,798 at the 2020 census. It is part of the York–Hanover metropolitan area.

== History ==
Settled in 1814, the village of Liverpool (now Manchester) was incorporated in 1869 in the eastern section of Manchester Township. During the Gettysburg campaign of the American Civil War, Liverpool's merchants were raided by the 17th Virginia Cavalry.

== Geography ==
Manchester is located at 40°03′39″N 76°43′11″W.

According to the United States Census Bureau, the borough has a total area of 0.8 square miles (2.1 km^{2}), all land.

== Demographics ==
Historical population
Census	Pop.	Note	%±
1870	406		—
1880	430		5.9%
1890	513		19.3%
1900	507		−1.2%
1910	547		7.9%
1920	716		30.9%
1930	940		31.3%
1940	1,004		6.8%
1950	1,264		25.9%
1960	1,454		15.0%
1970	2,391		64.4%
1980	2,027		−15.2%
1990	1,830		−9.7%
2000	2,350		28.4%
2010	2,763		17.6%
2020	2,800		1.3%
2021 (est.)	2,788	▼	−0.4%

As of the census of 2000, there were 2,350 people, 1,009 households, and 664 families living in the borough. The population density was 2,986.4 inhabitants per square mile (1,153.1/km^{2}). There were 1,058 housing units at an average density of 1,344.5 per square mile (519.1/km^{2}). The racial makeup of the borough was 97.28% White, 0.47% African American, 0.26% Native American, 0.26% Asian, 0.89% from other races, and 0.85% from two or more races. Hispanic or Latino of any race were 1.49% of the population.

There were 1,009 households, out of which 28.6% had children under the age of 18 living with them, 49.9% were married couples living together, 11.8% had a female householder with no husband present, and 34.1% were non-families. 27.0% of all households were made up of individuals, and 9.2% had someone living alone who was 65 years of age or older. The average household size was 2.33 and the average family size was 2.81.

In the borough the population was spread out, with 21.5% under the age of 18, 10.3% from 18 to 24, 34.2% from 25 to 44, 21.4% from 45 to 64, and 12.6% who were 65 years of age or older. The median age was 35 years. For every 100 females there were 95.7 males. For every 100 females age 18 and over, there were 92.7 males.

The median income for a household in the borough was $41,450, and the median income for a family was $47,845. Males had a median income of $32,219 versus $22,000 for females. The per capita income for the borough was $18,700. About 2.4% of families and 3.7% of the population were below the poverty line, including 3.0% of those under age 18 and 4.8% of those age 65 or over.

== Education ==
Manchester is served by the Northeastern York School District.

== Notable people ==
- Chester H. Gross (1888–1973), American politician buried in Manchester
- Wayne Schafer (born 1963), business owner who moved to Manchester in 2012
