= Howard Tunnel =

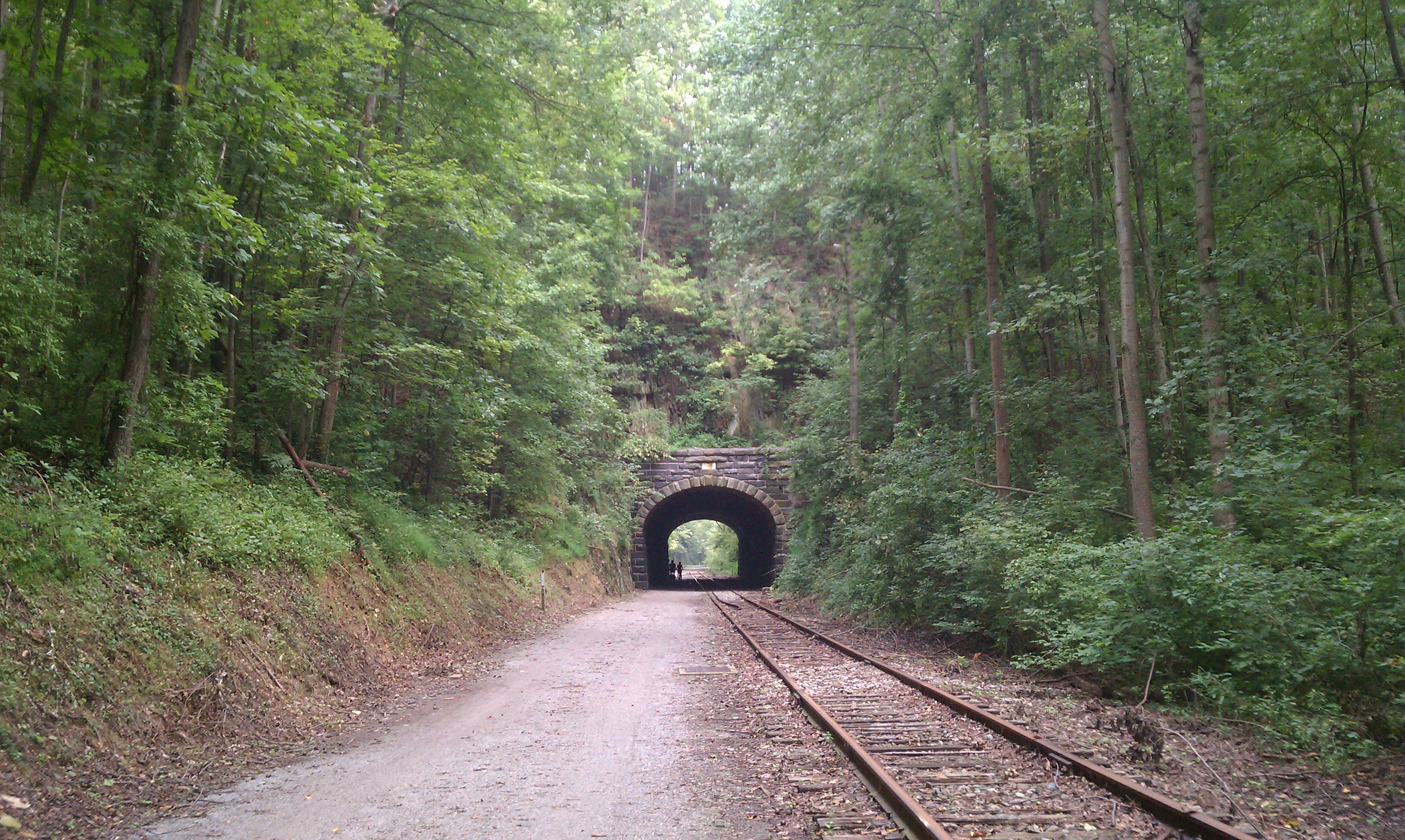
- The Howard Tunnel's south portal.
- Interactive map of Howard Tunnel

Overview
- Location: Northern Central railroad tracks near the South Branch of Codorus Creek, southeast of New Salem, North Codorus Township, Pennsylvania, United States

Operation
- Opened: 1838
- Character: brick lined

Technical
- Line length: 275 ft (84 m)
- Howard Tunnel, Northern Central Railway
- U.S. National Register of Historic Places
- Location within Pennsylvania Location within the United States
- Nearest city: New Salem, Pennsylvania
- Coordinates: 39°53′28″N 76°45′2″W
- Area: less than one acre
- Built: 1840
- MPS: Railroad Resources of York County MPS
- NRHP reference No.: 95000541
- Added to NRHP: May 19, 1995

The Howard Tunnel is located near Seven Valleys, Pennsylvania. In operation since 1838, it is the second oldest active rail tunnel in the U.S. Originally constructed by the York and Maryland Line Rail Road, it formed a critical link in the north-south line assembled by the Northern Central Railway.

It is a 275-foot (84 m) long, brick-lined tunnel built between 1836 and 1837 and opened for traffic in 1838. During the Civil War, the tunnel, then part of the Northern Central Railway system, was a target of Confederate cavalry troops, but was protected by elements of the 20th Pennsylvania state militia. However, nearby railroad bridges on the NCR down to Hanover Junction were destroyed by Confederate forces. After the war, the tunnel was rebuilt to accommodate two tracks in 1868.

The line was again damaged during Hurricane Agnes in 1972 and rebuilt by the Commonwealth of Pennsylvania in 1985. Freight traffic failed to materialize and the line again fell dormant by 1996. The Northern Central Railway (no relation to the original owner) leased the line in 1996 and operated the Liberty Limited dinner train from New Freedom through the tunnel to York until September 2, 2001.

York County, Pennsylvania purchased the tunnel along with its rail corridor in 1990 and has maintained it as part of a historic railroad, thereby preserving its status as an "active" tunnel. The tunnel was listed in the National Register of Historic Places in 1995. In August 1999 the county government completed a track-side trail, the Heritage Rail Trail which led to the tunnel being refurbished in 1999 and again in 2003.

According to information posted in the front window of Steam Into History Inc. (501c) there is currently a fund raising effort to restore passenger train service through the Howard Tunnel by Steam Into History's Excursion trains. As of July 9, 2016, they have received 1/2 the funds necessary to repair the tracks from Hanover Junction, Pennsylvania to York, Pennsylvania.

== See also ==
- Steam into History
