= Susquehanna Railroad =

Susquehanna Railroad may refer to:

- Susquehanna Railroad (1833), a paper railroad conceived to connect the canal at Nanticoke with New York State
- Susquehanna Railroad (1851-1854), predecessor of the Northern Central Railway (Pennsylvania system) in Pennsylvania
- Susquehanna Railroad (1891–1893), predecessor of the Buffalo and Susquehanna Railroad (Baltimore and Ohio system) in Pennsylvania

== See also ==
- Susquehanna Railway
