= New Freedom =

New Freedom may refer to:

- New Freedom, Pennsylvania, a borough in York County, Pennsylvania, United States
- New Freedom, New Jersey, an unincorporated community in Camden County, New Jersey, United States
- The New Freedom, Woodrow Wilson's domestic policy while President of the United States
- New Freedom (SAFETEA-LU), a program with the USA's current transportation planning and funding legislation, SAFETEA-LU
- New Freedom, a former brand of feminine hygiene by Kotex

== See also ==
- New Freedom Commission on Mental Health
- New Freedom Railroad Station, Northern Central Railway
