= Dan Droz =

American sculptor

Daniel "Dan" Myron Droz (born August 27, 1950) is an American sculptor, entrepreneur, and author. His sculptures are present in the Museum of Art and History (Lancaster, California) and at the entrance to the Heritage Trail (Pittsburgh, Pennsylvania).

== Early life and education ==
Droz was born to Minnie and Sidney Droz in Pittsburgh, Pennsylvania. He created his first sculpture at the age of 12.

Droz is married to Cathy (Cohen) Droz, a former executive with Family Communications, producer of Mr. Rogers Neighborhood, Fred Rogers Company (FRC), Daniel Tiger’s Neighborhood, and other children’s programs. They have four children, Lani (Michael) Gamliel, David (Allie) Droz, Ben Droz, and Becca Droz.

As of 2022, the Droz family is known to have taken a picture in front of a numbered highway sign for their annual holiday card for the past 42 years.

Droz attended Harvard College, graduating cum laude in 1972. The same year, Droz, served as the Guest Design Director of the Mademoiselle Magazine.

== Career ==
In 1973, Droz returned to Pittsburgh to start Dan Droz Designs, a product design firm. He was also a furniture designer with Amisco Industries Ltd.

In 1972, Droz was a teaching assistant to Toshiro Katayama. At Carnegie Mellon University (CMU), he served as adjunct associate professor of design, visiting professor of design management, and director of design for business program.

In the same year, Droz served as the vice president of planning and product development at Droz Corporation. In 1984, he co-founded the Interdisciplinary Product Development Program at Carnegie Mellon University, with Peter Farquar and Fritz Prinz.

In 1988, the United States Information Agency (USIA) invited Droz as a Guide Training Coordinator to lead the training of American guides which toured 9 Soviet cities. In the same year, he founded Droz Marketing.

In 1990, he founded the Design for Business Program, funded by the National Endowment for the Arts (NEA). During 1996-2015, Droz co-founded Emodt, a technology startup.

Droz exhibited his work in 2018. His early works were wood and moveable elements. Droz developed methods of fabricating sculptures with wire mesh and techniques for folding glass and casting sculptures directly from 3D-printed models.

Droz’s main exhibitions were at the Westmoreland Museum of American Art, The Museum of Art and History, The State Museum of Pennsylvania, Pittsburgh International Airport, and the Three Rivers Heritage Trail.

In June 2022, Droz became the subject of the book Behind the Fold, a monograph on Droz’s life and work by Los Angeles publisher Griffith Moon. The book documents his recent work and fabrication methods for creating glass sculptures.

== Awards ==
- 7 Daphne Awards (“Oscars’ of Furniture Design), 1984 - 1986, (Unprecedented)
- Designer’s Choice Award for Outstanding Industrial Design, Industrial Design Magazine, 1984
- Best of the United States, Review of Products, Abitari Magazine, Milan, Italy, 1983
