= New Freedom station =

- New Freedom Railroad Station, Northern Central Railway
- U.S. National Register of Historic Places
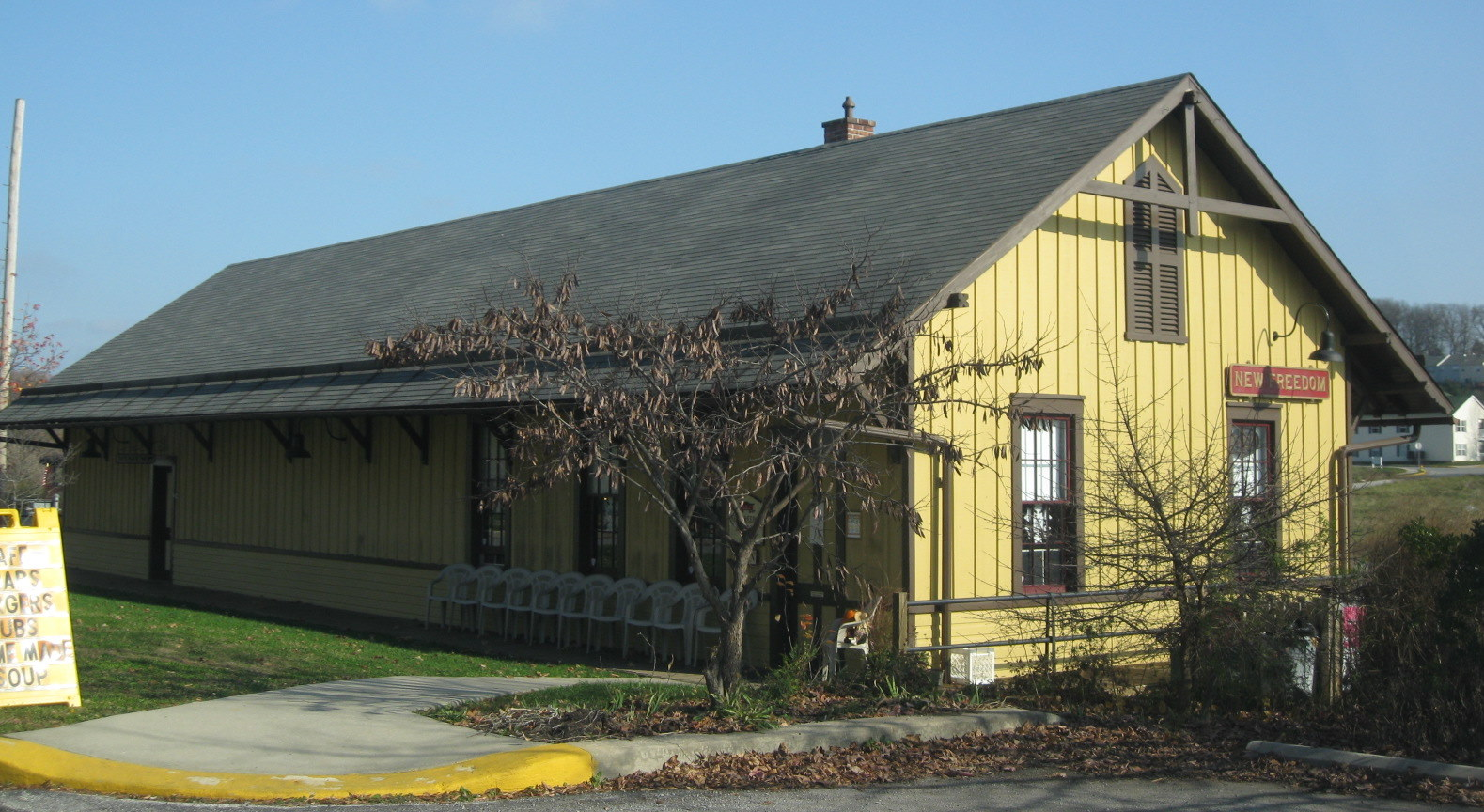
- New Freedom Railroad Station, November 2009

- Location within Pennsylvania Location within the United States
- Location: Front St., New Freedom, Pennsylvania
- Coordinates: 39°44′24″N 76°42′2.5″W
- Area: less than one acre
- Built: 1870
- Architectural style: Late Victorian
- MPS: Railroad Resources of York County MPS
- NRHP reference No.: 95000539
- Added to NRHP: May 4, 1995

New Freedom is a historic railway station located at New Freedom, York County, Pennsylvania. It was built about 1870 by the Northern Central Railway, and is a 1 1/2-story, rectangular frame building with a gable roof and overhanging eaves. The building ceased to be used as a railway station in 1960.

It was added to the National Register of Historic Places in 1995 as the New Freedom Railroad Station, Northern Central Railway.

== Gallery ==
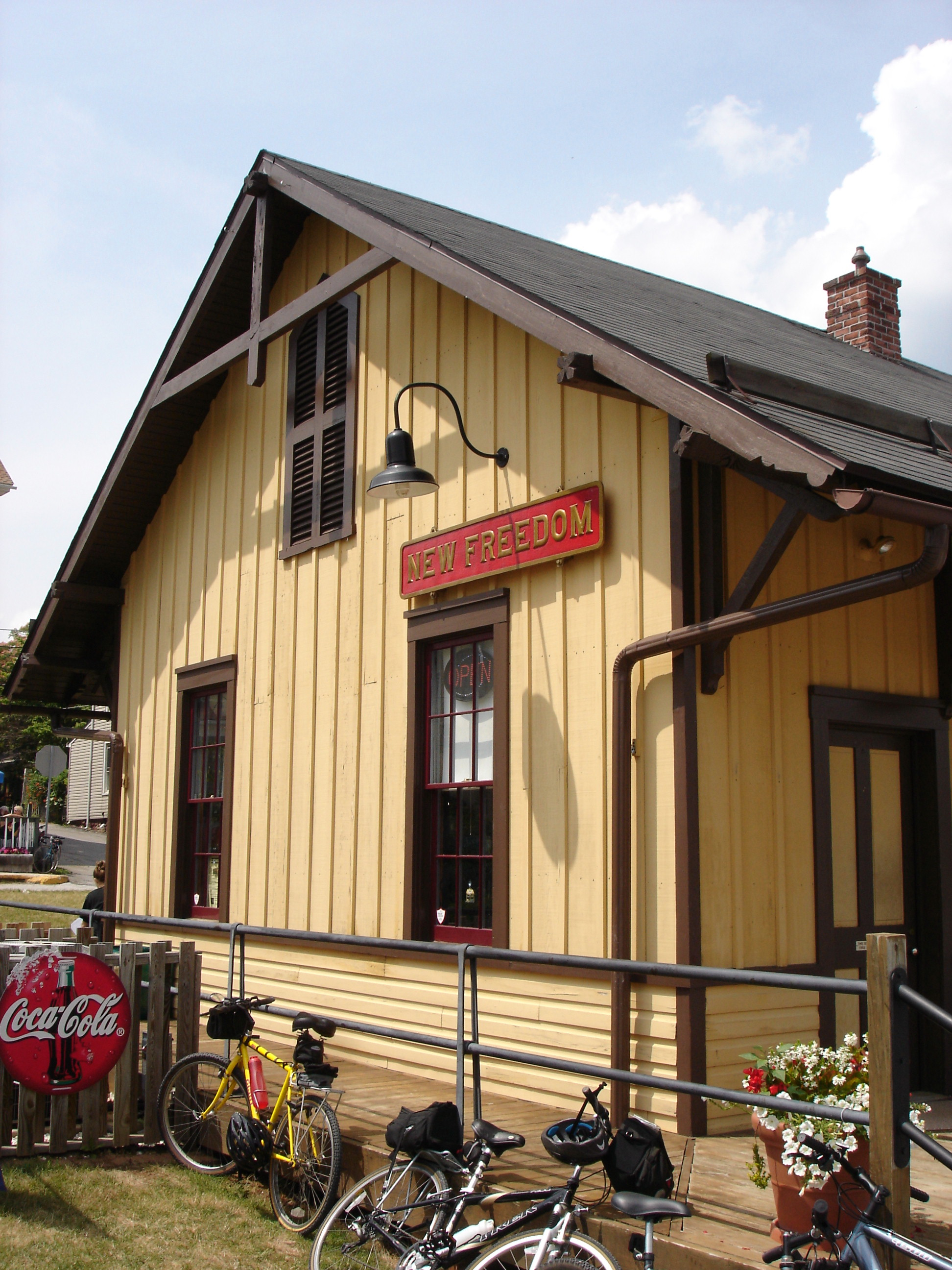
New Freedom Railroad Station, detail

Preceding station	Pennsylvania Railroad	Following station
Shrewsbury toward Harrisburg	Northern Central Railway; Baltimore Division	Freeland toward Calvert Street
