= Ruxton-Riderwood train collision =

Train collision in Ruxton-Riderwood, Maryland

- Location of the collision within Maryland Ruxton-Riderwood train collision (the United States)

Details
- Date: July 4, 1854; 4:25 pm
- Location: Ruxton-Riderwood, Maryland
- Coordinates: 39°24′41″N 76°38′40″W
- Country: United States
- Operator: Baltimore & Susquehanna Railroad
- Incident type: Collision

Statistics
- Trains: 2
- Deaths: 30-35
- Injured: 100+

The Ruxton-Riderwood train collision occurred on July 4, 1854. At the time, it was one of the deadliest train accident in the United States.

== Background ==
The patch of railroad that ran through Ruxton and Riderwood was formerly controlled by the Baltimore & Susquehanna Railroad. Prior to the accident, the Baltimore & Susquehanna Railroad was facing severe financial issues.

On July 4th of 1854, thousands of day-trippers had just picnicked at Rider's Grove and were now returning on multiple excursion trains.

== Accident ==
Three trains had been scheduled to pass Relay Station. One of the engineers had waited on a stretch of line with the view of the distance blocked by a curve. The engineer, mistakenly believing that an anticipated train had already passed, proceeded forward. However, as the train continued its next leg of the trip, the anticipated train was then revealed to be on the same line as the excursion train. About a mile north of the station, both of the trains collided resulting in the boilers exploding.

In the aftermath of the accident, the dead and injured were laid out on the grass beside the patch of tracks. Injuries varied from scalding from the boilers to injuries sustained when the passenger coaches were crushed by each other. In total 30 to 35 were killed and more than one hundred were injured.

== Impact ==
The pre-existing financial difficulties mixed with the human cost of the accident led to the dissolution and sale of the Baltimore & Susquehanna Railroad.

Train collisions such as this one and the Great Train Wreck of 1856 helped garner support for timetables to be used by railroad companies to ensure that locomotive operate accordingly.
