= Torrey C. Brown =

American politician (1937–2014)

Secretary Maryland Department of Natural Resources
- In office 1983–1995

Maryland House of Delegates 3rd District
- In office 1971–1975
- Preceded by: Helen B. Cassady
- Succeeded by: (none, redistricting)

Maryland House of Delegates 39th District
- In office 1975–1983
- Preceded by: (new district)
- Succeeded by: Curt Anderson

Personal details
- Born: February 28. 1937 Chicago, Illinois
- Died: April 20, 2014 (aged 77) Annapolis, Maryland
- Party: Democratic
- Spouse: Donna Marx
- Children: Therron and Rafe

Torrey C. Brown (February 28, 1937 – April 20, 2014) was an American politician who served in the Maryland House of Delegates and was the Secretary of the Maryland Department of Natural Resources.

== Background ==
Brown was born in Chicago, Illinois and graduated from the University of Chicago High School. He earned a B.A. degree at Wheaton College in 1957 and then came to Baltimore to go to medical school. Brown received his medical degree from the Johns Hopkins University School of Medicine in 1961. After completing his residency in internal medicine, Brown joined the Hopkins faculty. He was promoted to assistant dean of the School of Medicine and later rose to become the vice president of Johns Hopkins Hospital. He also served with the U.S. Public Health Service from 1963 to 1965.

== In the Legislature ==
Brown was first elected to the Maryland House of Delegates in 1971 and represented Legislative District 39, in Baltimore City, until 1983. He was a member of the Environmental Matters Committee and became its chairman in 1979. In his first year in the legislature, one of his colleagues, Delegate Russell O. Hickman, suffered a heart attack during a debate. Brown and fellow physician Dr. Aris T. Allen, a state senator from Annapolis, were credited with saving his life.

== As Secretary of the Department of Natural Resources ==
In 1982, after redistricting, Brown ran for re-election to the Maryland House of Delegates, but this time in the newly created 44th legislative district. He was pitted against three other incumbents: Delegates Dennis C. McCoy, Frank Robey and Anne Scarlett Perkins as well as several newcomers including former television news anchor Curt Anderson. Although three seats were up for election, Brown finished fourth behind Anderson, McCoy and Perkins. He was, however, appointed by Governor Harry Hughes to be the new Secretary of the Maryland Department of Natural Resources and assumed that post in 1983.

As Secretary, Brown proved to be a formidable advocate for saving Maryland's natural resources. In 1984 Brown issued a moratorium that saved the dwindling Maryland rockfish population. He championed Program Open Space, which preserved thousand of acres of Maryland land and wildlife. Maryland hatched more bald eagles in the next 20 years (about 1,800) than existed 20 years ago in the whole lower 48 states. Brown also spearheaded Ocean City beach replenishment working with local property owners.
Brown served as chairman of the Power Plant Research Advisory Committee and a vocal member of the Chesapeake Bay Trust.

== As CEO ==
In 1998 Brown returned to his roots as a researcher. He co-founded a biotech firm called Intralytix Inc. He directed the company's effort to find useful applications for Bacteriophages or "phages". A phage is a virus that infects and devours bacteria. With more bacteria becoming resistant to antibiotics, Brown felt that the use of bacteria's naturally occurring enemy would ultimately surpass the use of lab-invented antibiotics which over time become ineffective in their original doses. Brown wanted to adopt existing knowledge about phage therapies and use them in the United States.

== Death ==
Brown died of heart disease on April 20, 2014, at the age of 77.

== Legacy ==
On the day of his death, Maryland Governor Martin O'Malley ordered Maryland flags be flown at half-staff. A hiking trail, the Torrey C. Brown Rail Trail, that extends from Maryland into Pennsylvania, is named in his honor. In 2008, Brown received the Woodrow Wilson Award, an award given to Hopkins' alumni for distinguished public service, from the Johns Hopkins University alumni association.
