= James Crawford Neilson =

American architect (1816-1900)

- Born: October 14, 1816; Baltimore, Maryland
- Died: December 21, 1900 (aged 84); Harford County, Maryland
- Occupation: Architect
- Buildings: Washington and Lee University

James Crawford Neilson (October 14, 1816 – December 21, 1900), or J. Crawford Neilson, was a Baltimore, Maryland-based architect. He was born in Baltimore, Maryland in 1816. After the death of his father in 1822 the family moved to England and in 1824 to Brussels. In 1833, he returned to Baltimore and in 1835, became a member of the survey party working on the Baltimore and Port Deposit Railroad, (later merged into the Philadelphia, Wilmington and Baltimore Railroad, then absorbed 1881 by the Pennsylvania Railroad). His supervisor was Benjamin Henry Latrobe, II, (1806-1878), later supervising engineer on the Baltimore and Ohio Railroad, (B. & O.), son of an equally famous architect, Benjamin Henry Latrobe, (1764-1820). It was at this time that he first became acquainted with John Rudolph Niernsee, (1814-1885), while helping to survey in the area of Martinsburg, Virginia (later West Virginia), for the Baltimore and Ohio Railroad.

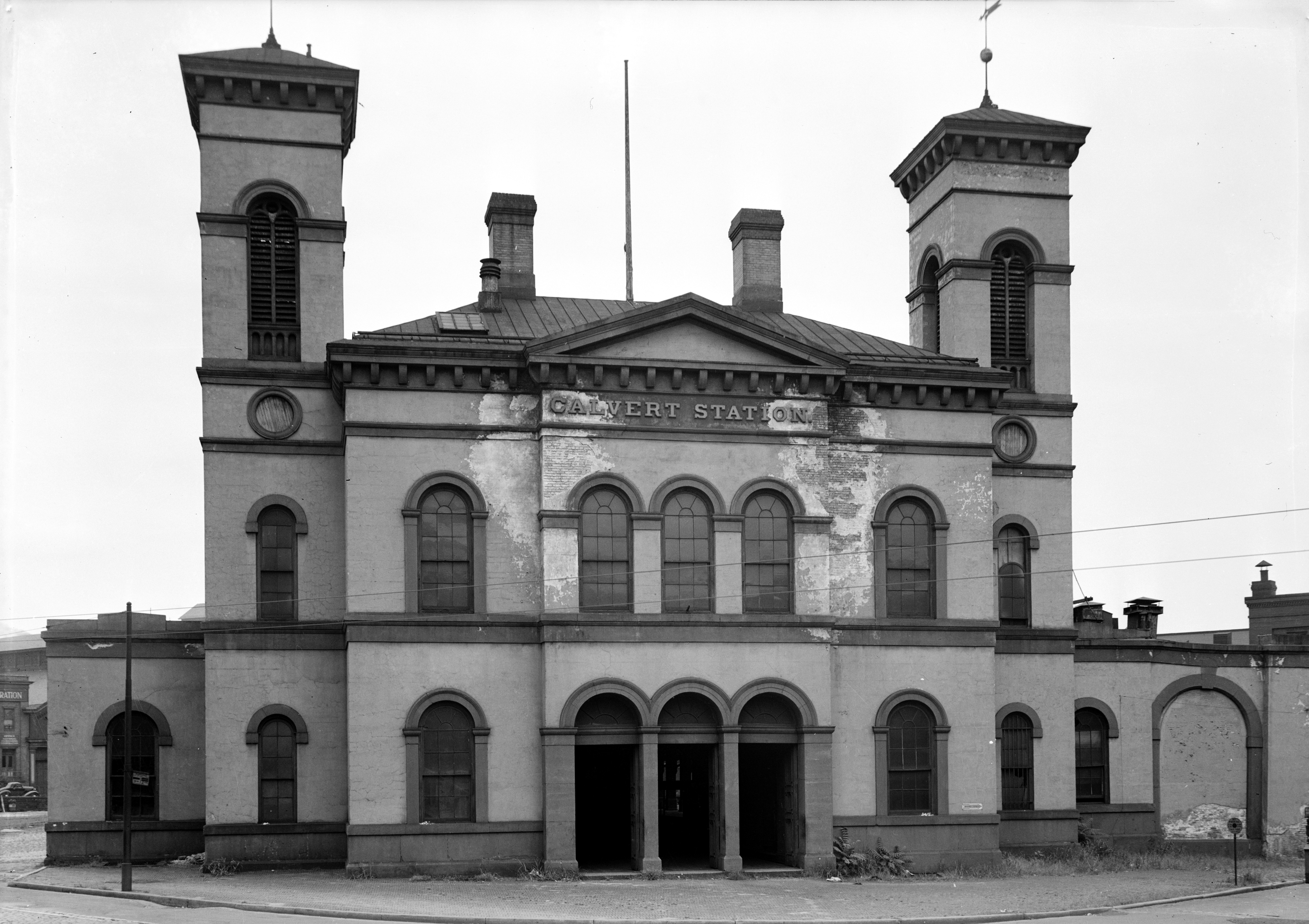
Calvert Street Station, at North Calvert Street at Bath and East Franklin Streets, upper downtown Baltimore, built 1849-1850 for the Baltimore and Susquehanna Railroad, second railway authorized in Maryland, photo taken 1936, building razed 1949 for "Baltimore Sun" newspaper offices

He and Niernsee entered partnership in the practice of architecture as Niernsee & Neilson in June 1848. Commissions included railroad stations for the B&O, commercial buildings, several churches, and both country homes and townhouses for the well-to-do, many of whom were in fact directors of the B&O Railroad. The firm disbanded in 1856, when Niernsee was made architect of the capitol of South Carolina. When Niernsee returned to Baltimore in 1865, the partnership was revived. It was at this time, that they took into their office a number of young interns who later became prominent themselves, including R. Snowden Andrews, Eben Faxson, Bruce Price, and, briefly, E. Francis Baldwin. Nielson was a founding member of the Baltimore Chapter of the American Institute of Architects at its charter in 1870. The firm disbanded again in 1875 at which time, through his friendship with George Washington Custis Lee, he worked on several college buildings, the Mausoleum in the Lee Chapel, and faculty residences at Washington and Lee University.

Neilson had married Rosa Williams in the 1830s, whose family owned farmland along Deer Creek in Harford County at a place called Priestford. Among their children was Charles Neilson, who attained the rank of General and became Assistant Postmaster General of the United States. Neilson died in 1900, at Priestford and he is buried in the family cemetery.

== Selected works ==
- 1849-1850: Calvert Street Station (Baltimore, Maryland), terminal/depot for the Baltimore and Susquehanna Railroad (later the Northern Central Railway, merged into the Pennsylvania Railroad, (by Niernsee & Neilson), on North Calvert Street at Bath/East Franklin Streets, (alongside Orleans Street Viaduct of 1936, razed 1949 for the "Baltimore Sun" newspaper offices)
- 1850–1852: Grace Protestant Episcopal Church, Baltimore
- 1855-1856: St. John the Evangelist Roman Catholic Church (by Niernsee & Neilson), Baltimore, Maryland, listed on the National Register of Historic Places in 1982.
- 1856 Baltimore and Ohio Railroad Camden Station, 301 West Camden Street, Baltimore, Maryland (Niernsee & Neilson)
- 1868: "Aigburth Vale", off York Road, Towson, Maryland, (by Niernsee & Neilson), listed on the National Register of Historic Places in 1999.
- 1870: Churchville Presbyterian Church (clock tower by Niernsee & Neilson), Churchville, Maryland, listed on the National Register of Historic Places in 1986.
- ca. 1870: "Clifton Mansion" (summer home of Henry Thompson, later renovated by Johns Hopkins, (1795-1873), at Clifton Park, Baltimore, off Harford Road, (renovated/rebuilt by Niernsee & Neilson), listed on the National Register of Historic Places in 2007.
- ca. 1880: New York, Lake Erie and Western Railway depot, Buffalo, New York
