= Aigburth Vale =

Historic house in Maryland

- U.S. National Register of Historic Places
- Location within Maryland Location within the United States
- Location: 212 Aigburth Road, Towson, Maryland
- Coordinates: 39°23′30.5″N 76°35′53″W
- Built: 1868
- Architect: Niernsee & Neilson
- Architectural style: Second Empire
- NRHP reference No.: 99001016
- Added to NRHP: August 27, 1999

Aigburth Vale house at 212 Aigburth Road in Towson was designed in 1868, by architects Niernsee & Neilson, as a country home for wealthy actor John E. Owens.

Most of the property of the estate was originally known as the Rock Spring Farm of Edward Taylor and the parcel was reported to have been over 197 acres (80 ha) when it was purchased by Owens in 1853. The mansion is a wood-framed, three-story structure is an example of Second Empire architecture and as such, is topped by mansard roofs on the tower and wings. For a period after 1886, the mansion functioned as an inn and as a summer home for Owens's widow, Mary. In 1889 the majority of the land associated with the estate was sold at auction by the mortgage holder: the Sheppard Pratt Hospital to John Hubner, a Catonsville developer. Thereafter the mansion house and surrounding 4.9 acres (2.0 ha) was sold to Dr. George F. Sargent, as a private mental hospital from 1919 to 1950. Hubner sold the agricultural land to the Towson Nurseries who subdivided portions of it for sale to the Baltimore County Board of Education in 1943 and 1946 for use as the site for Towson High School and its surrounding campus. The mansion building was leased to Baltimore County Board of Education in 1950 for use as administrative offices and thereafter became the current owners of the building. The Owens estate was once surrounded by over 200 acres (81 ha) but today it stands within a suburban neighborhood. As designed, entry to the estate was gained from York Road along what is now Cedar Avenue. The gatehouse building of the estate, built in 1860 by Jacob Reese, still stands though the intersection of Cedar and York has been closed.

The building has been identified as an outstanding example of Second Empire architecture. It was listed on the National Register of Historic Places on April 27, 1999.
