= John Rudolph Niernsee =

Prominent Architect and Confederate Officer (1814-1885)

- Born: May 27, 1814; Vienna, Austria
- Died: June 7, 1885 (aged 71); Baltimore, Maryland, U.S.
- Occupation: Architect
- Buildings: South Carolina State House
- Projects: Baltimore and Ohio Railroad structures

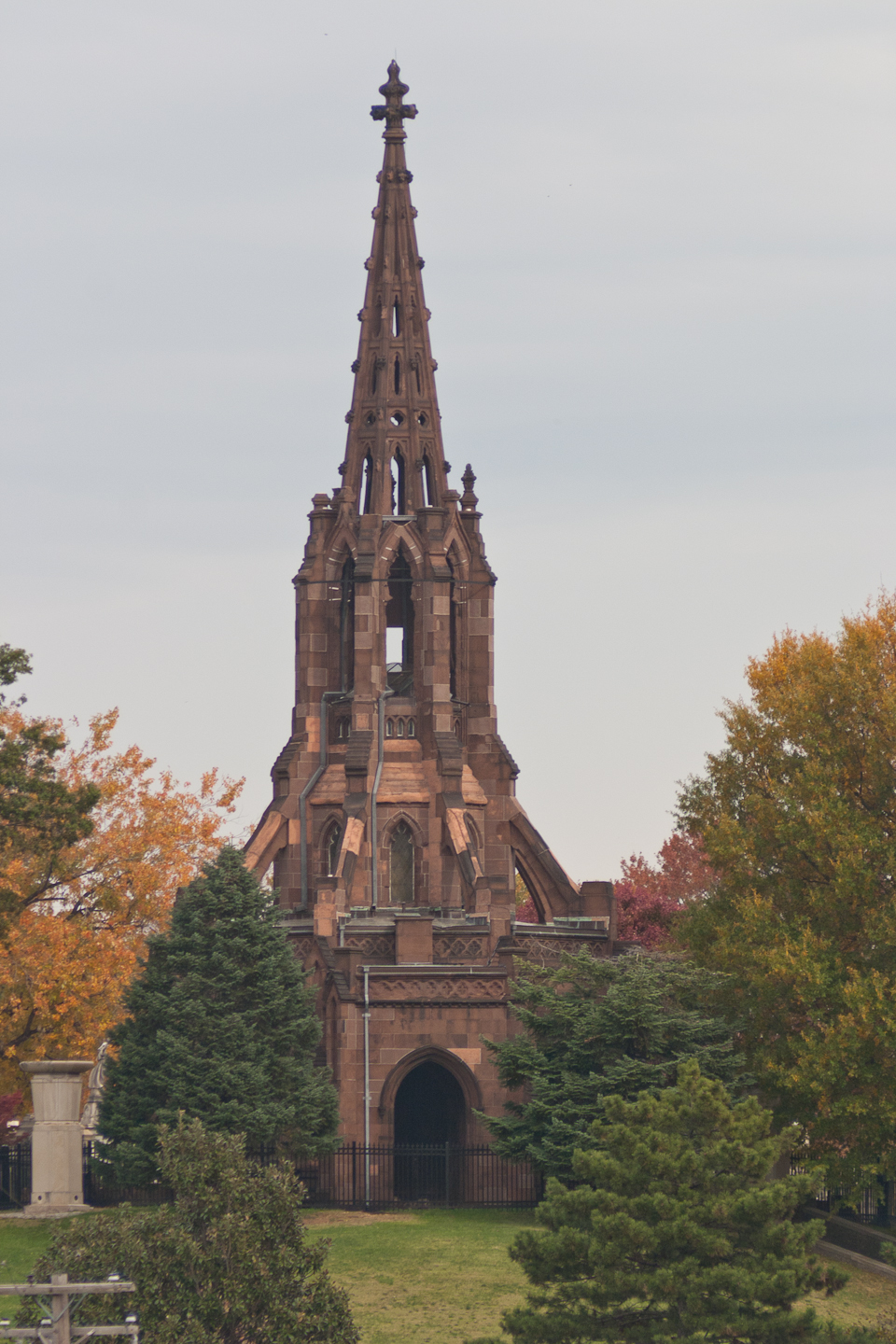
Green Mount Cemetery Chapel

John Rudolph Niernsee (May 27, 1814 – June 7, 1885) was an American architect. He served as the head architect for the Baltimore and Ohio Railroad (B. & O.). Rudolph also largely contributed to the design and construction of the South Carolina State House located in Columbia, South Carolina. Along with his partner, James Crawford Neilson, Rudolph established the standard for professional design and construction of public works projects within Baltimore and across different states in the United States.

== Early life ==
He was born as Johann Rudolph Niernsee in Vienna, capital city of the old Austrian Empire and immigrated to the United States in 1837, at age 22.

== Career ==
He apprenticed to Benjamin Henry Latrobe, II, (1806–1878), engineer and manager at the B. & O. and other railroads, (and son of another well-known architect, his father Benjamin Henry Latrobe, 1764–1820). In 1847, with James Crawford Neilson, (1816–1900), he formed the Niernsee & Neilson architectural firm that largely served the Baltimore and Ohio Railroad, (B. & O.).

He is credited with having mentored Ephraim Francis Baldwin, (1837–1916), another well-known Maryland and Baltimore architect (and formed the similarly locally-famous firm Baldwin & Pennington with Josias Pennington, [1854–1929]), who also designed buildings and stations for the Baltimore and Ohio Railroad (B. & O.).

During the American Civil War (1861-1865), Niernsee served in the Confederate States Army as a Major.

== Selected works ==
Works by Niernsee or by the firm (with attribution) are:

- Grace Episcopal (later called Grace and St. Peter's Church) Park Avenue & West Monument Street, 1850–52 designed with Nielsen
- Emmanuel Episcopal Cathedral at Eager St, 1857, designed with Nielsen
- The Green Mount Cemetery hilltop chapel, on Greenmount Avenue, Baltimore, Maryland, which he designed with Nielsen, is a Gothic Revival work.
- Baltimore's Johns Hopkins Hospital at 500 Broadway, and the Johns Hopkins Colored Children Orphan Asylum.

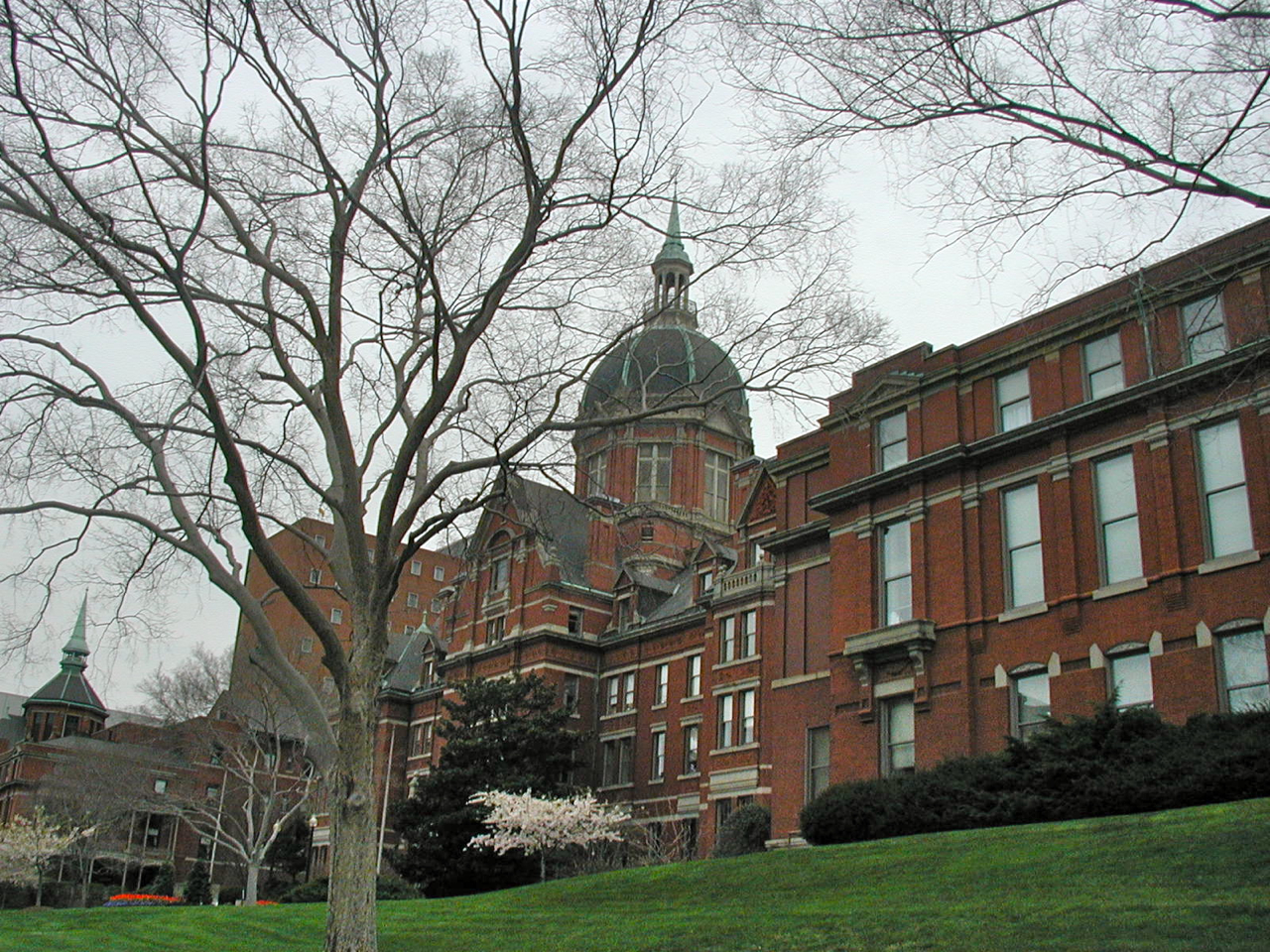
Johns Hopkins Hospital completed 1889

- 1855–56: St. John the Evangelist Roman Catholic Church (by Niernsee & Neilson), Baltimore. Listed on the National Register of Historic Places (NRHP) in 1982.
- 1855: Saint Paul's Church, 102 North Union Street, Petersburg, Virginia (Niernsee & Neilson), NRHP-listed.
- c. 1855, Villa Anneslie (mansion), 529 Dunkirk Road, Towson, Maryland (Niernsee, John Rudolph), NRHP-listed.
- 1856-1865, Baltimore and Ohio Railroad Camden Street Station, 301 West Camden Street, Baltimore, Maryland (Niernsee & Neilson)
- 1868: Aigburth Vale (mansion) in Towson (by Niernsee & Neilson), listed on the National Register of Historic Places (NRHP) in 1999.
- 1870: Churchville Presbyterian Church (Italianate clock tower by Niernsee & Neilson), Churchville, Maryland, listed on the NRHP in 1986.
- ca. 1870: Clifton Mansion (renovation of earlier mansion of Col. Henry Thompson) for new owner Johns Hopkins (1795-1873), at Clifton Park (by Niernsee & Neilson), listed on the NRHP in 2007.
- The Greek Revival South Carolina State House, in Columbia, is another National Historic Landmark building which Niernsee designed, c. 1851, although full implementation was delayed. From 1888 to 1891, a time when much of the interior work was completed, it was in fact Niernsee's son, Frank McHenry Niernsee, who served as architect. NRHP-listed.<-- Grace Church, Baltimore Sun Paper March 12, 1852 pg1—unclear fragment -->
- The Baltimore and Ohio Railroad Martinsburg Shops in Martinsburg, West Virginia, which he designed with engineer Albert Fink, were declared a National Historic Landmark in 2003.

Not in date order:

- Church of the Most Holy Trinity, 720 Telfair Street, Augusta, Georgia (Niernsee, John Rudolph), NRHP-listed
- St. Mary's Catholic Church (1858) located in the Edgefield Historic District, located along both sides of U.S. Route 25 through the town of Edgefield, South Carolina (Niernsee, John R.), NRHP-listed.
- Emmanuel Church, U.S. Route 301, Port Conway, Virginia. (Niernsee & Neilson), NRHP-listed/
- Martin's Brandon Church, Virginia Highways 10 and 1201, Burrowsville. (Niernsee & Neilson), NRHP-listed.
- Mount Vernon Place United Methodist Church and Asbury House, 2–10 East Mount Vernon Place/East Monument Street (at North Charles Street/Washington Place-North), Baltimore, (Niernsee & Neilson), NRHP-listed.

== Personal life ==
Niernsee was buried at St. Peter's Catholic Church in Columbia, South Carolina.
