= Torrey C. Brown Rail Trail =

Rail trail in Baltimore County, Maryland

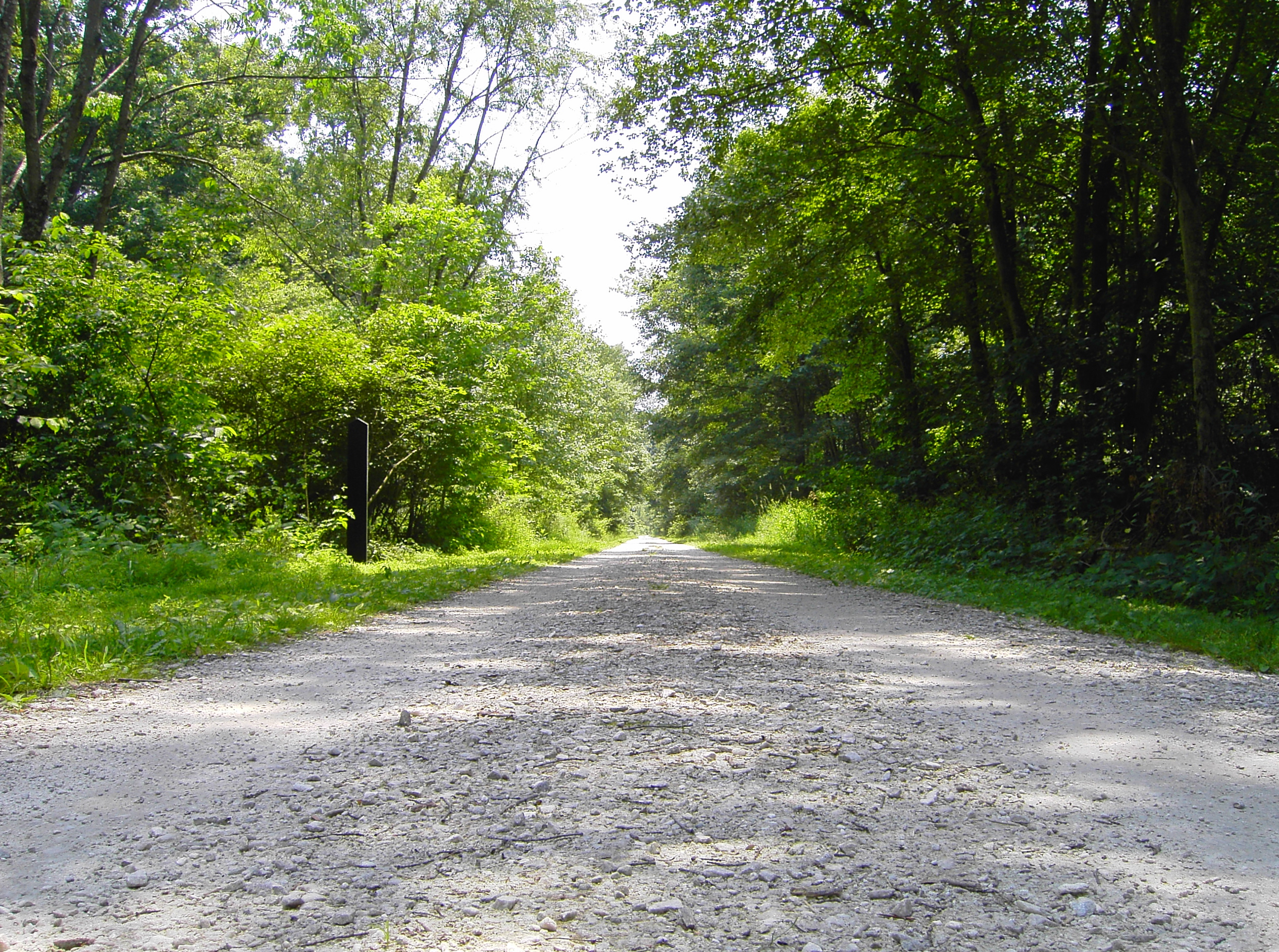
- The trail's crushed limestone surface
- Length: 19.7 mi (31.7 km)
- Location: Northern Baltimore County, Maryland; continuing to York, Pennsylvania, via York County Heritage Rail Trail
- Established: 1984
- Trailheads: Cockeysville; New Freedom
- Use: Hiking, biking, horseback riding, fishing, pet walking
- Difficulty: Easy, level, ADA accessible
- Season: Year-round
- Months: Year-round
- Surface: Crushed limestone
- Right of way: Northern Central Railway
- Website: https://dnr.maryland.gov/publiclands/Pages/central/tcb.aspx
Trail map

The Torrey C. Brown Rail Trail (TCB), formerly known as Northern Central Railroad (NCR) Trail, is a rail trail that runs along a former Northern Central Railway corridor in Baltimore County, Maryland, United States. The trail extends 19.7 miles from Ashland Road in Cockeysville to the Mason–Dixon line, where it becomes the York County Heritage Rail Trail and continues to York, Pennsylvania.

The trail is 10 feet (3.0 m) wide with a stone dust surface. The majority of the trail runs along the Gunpowder River and Beetree Run. TCB makes up a segment of the East Coast Greenway, a 3,000 mile long system of trails connecting Maine to Florida.

== Historical development ==
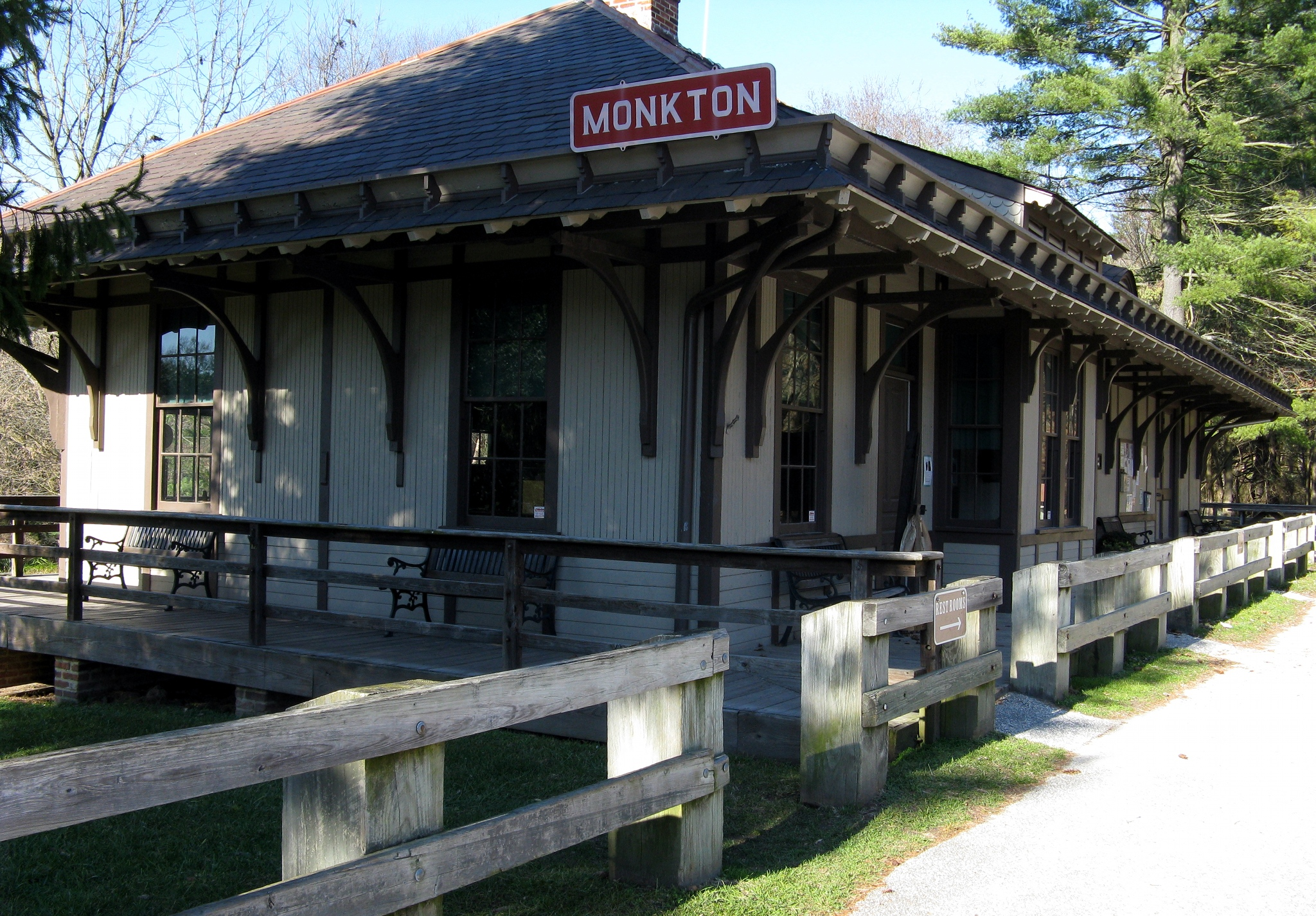
Monkton Station

=== Historical significance ===
The Northern Central Railway, built in 1832, ran between Baltimore, Maryland, and Sunbury, Pennsylvania, and was one of the oldest rail lines in the country. The railway serviced the growing Baltimore, York and Harrisburg industries, had 46 stops, 22 of which were in Maryland, and operated for 140 years. It carried passengers, people vacationing at Bentley Springs, and freight between Baltimore and York or Harrisburg, Pennsylvania. During the Civil War, the Pennsylvania Railroad-controlled Northern Central served as a major transportation route for supplies, food, clothing, and material, as well as troops heading to the South from Camp Curtin and other Northern military training stations.

Already in financial trouble, the NCR ceased operations between Cockeysville and York in 1972 after Hurricane Agnes caused extensive damage to its infrastructure. The Penn Central then petitioned the Interstate Commerce Commission to allow it to abandon the railroad south of York; the Maryland section of the abandoned line was purchased by Baltimore County in the mid-1970s.

The former railroad bed, was converted to a rail trail in 1984. Historical markers can be found along the trail, such as the former Monkton station, which now serves as a museum, gift shop, and ranger station.

=== History and evolution ===
In the early 1980s when it was proposed to place the trail in the place of the train tracks, a contentious battle raged between property owners and the state. The owners contended that the property was taken under eminent domain for the purpose of train tracks, and that once the property was no longer to be used for a train the property rights should revert to the previous land owners.

The state prevailed in its fight for the property and the Maryland Department of Natural Resources converted the corridor into a trail which opened to the public in 1984. The trail is used by hundreds of people daily by bicycle, foot and horse. The trail also provides access to the Gunpowder River and Loch Raven watershed. In honor of Natural Resources Secretary Torrey C. Brown's support for the trail, it was renamed the Torrey C. Brown Rail Trail in 2007.

== Trail development ==
=== Design and construction ===
The majority of the trail is 10 feet wide with a smooth surface of crushed limestone. The trail is wheel-chair accessible. Mile 0 of the Trail is located just off Maryland Route 145 (Ashland Road). A larger parking lot is located less than a mile north of Mile 0 on Paper Mill Road, and additional parking lots exist along the length of the trail.

Warning signals, mileage markers, signals, and railroad signs are placed throughout the trail to warn and ensure the safety of trail goers.

Amenities along the trail include drinking fountains, picnic tables, benches, and portable restrooms. Within a mile of the trail, there are hotels and motels and there is easy access to a bike shop that rents and repairs bikes. In addition to the renovations to the Monkton Station, there is also the Sparks Bank Nature Center, in Sparks, Maryland.

== Community ==
Torrey C. Brown Trail is managed and maintained by the Maryland Department of Natural Resources.
