= Northern Central Railway =

Railway connecting Baltimore MD and Sunbury PA, US

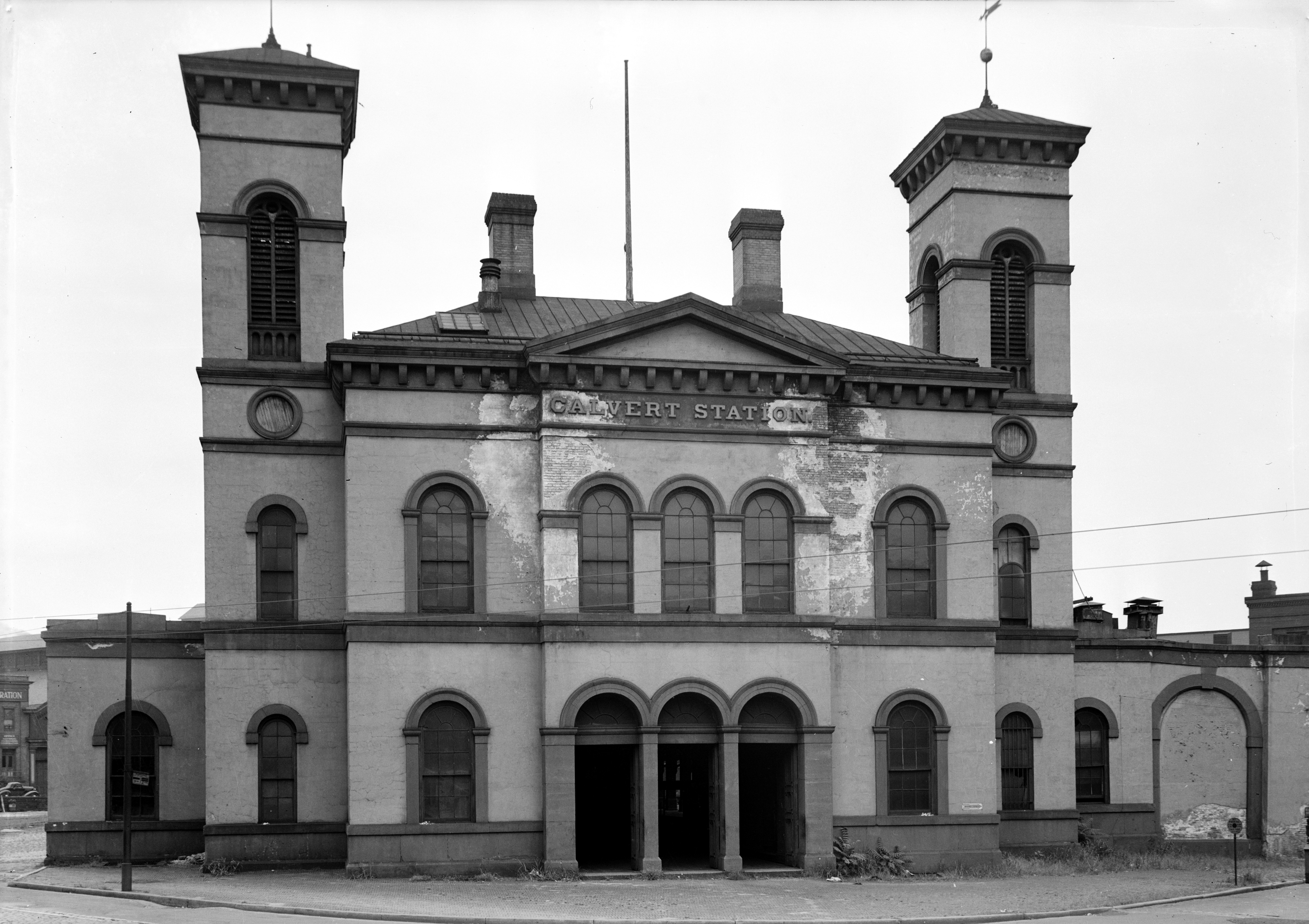
- Calvert Street Station at North Calvert and Bath/East Franklin Streets, in downtown Baltimore, built 1849-1850, razed 1949; designed by James Crawford Neilson

Overview
- Headquarters: Baltimore
- Reporting mark: NCRY
- Locale: Pennsylvania and Maryland
- Dates of operation: 1858–1976
- Predecessor: Baltimore and Susquehanna Railroad, York and Maryland Line Rail Road, Susquehanna Railroad
- Successor: Conrail

Technical
- Track gauge: 4 ft 8 1/2 in (1,435 mm) standard gauge
- Length: 380 miles (610 km) (including leased lines)

The Northern Central Railway (NCRY) was a Class I Railroad in the United States connecting Baltimore, Maryland, with Sunbury, Pennsylvania, along the Susquehanna River. Completed in 1858, the line came under the control of the Pennsylvania Railroad (PRR) in 1861, when the PRR acquired a controlling interest in the Northern Central's stock to compete with the rival Baltimore and Ohio Railroad (B&O).

For eleven decades, the Northern Central operated as a subsidiary of the Pennsylvania Railroad until much of its Maryland trackage was washed out by Hurricane Agnes in 1972, after which the Penn Central declined to repair destroyed sections and the remainder fell into disuse. It is now a fallen flag railway, having come under the control of Conrail and then the Norfolk Southern Railway.

Trackage from Camden Station in Baltimore to Timonium, Maryland, remains in service as part of the Baltimore Light RailLink line, while much of the line in Pennsylvania is operated by the Norfolk Southern for freight service. The Northern Central Railway of York, a heritage railway, operates on former Northern Central track between New Freedom and Hanover Junction, Pennsylvania.

The route between York, Pennsylvania, and the Maryland-Pennsylvania line is now the York County Heritage Rail Trail, much of which is side-by-side with still-functioning track. Torrey C. Brown Rail Trail, a similar hike/bike trail in Northern Maryland, connects with the York County Heritage Rail Trail and continues down to Baltimore either on rural roads or the old railroad grade.

== Early history ==
=== The need for a railroad ===
Farmers and producers in central and southern Pennsylvania were eager to sell their grain, coal, lumber, and other products, and the cities of Baltimore and Philadelphia both wanted access to this potentially rich trade. But the ridges and valleys of the Piedmont and Appalachians blocked any easy trade routes from central Pennsylvania to markets on the coast. The upper Susquehanna River provided an important, navigable route throughout central Pennsylvania, but the Conewago Falls and other hazards below and southeast of Middletown made travel to Chesapeake Bay difficult; upstream traffic from the bay was impossible. Shippers tried to move cargoes using rafts, flatboats, or disposable “arks” that were flimsily built and loaded upstream, then dismantled at the river’s mouth in Havre de Grace, Maryland. But many craft were damaged or wrecked on the trip downstream.

Traffic that did successfully maneuver through the rapids typically went to Baltimore, the closest city to the river’s outlet on Chesapeake Bay. This was not appreciated by merchants in Philadelphia: although in 1802 Pennsylvania and Maryland had agreed on building a canal from the Delaware River to Chesapeake Bay, that project had foundered, so Philadelphia had no direct water access to the Susquehanna. Beginning in 1826, Pennsylvania committed to building a network of canals to ease navigation, the "Main Line," specifically opening up routes for trade to Philadelphia. But mountainous terrain made it difficult to build and operate canals, and slow travel times, inconvenient locations, and winter closures made the canals difficult to use.

=== The Baltimore and Susquehanna Railroad ===
In 1827, a group of toll-road owners in York County, Pennsylvania, requested help from businessmen in Baltimore to explore building what eventually became the Baltimore and Susquehanna Railroad Company (B&S). The turnpike owners and farmers were frustrated by the difficulties of getting products to Philadelphia, where some felt exploited, forced to accept what merchants in Philadelphia were willing to pay. When surveys showed that building a railroad would be feasible, the York County group asked the General Assembly of Maryland to grant a railroad charter. This was approved on February 13, 1828, with an initial stock outlay of $800,000. The B&S was the second designated rail system in the state, given authority to construct a railroad from Baltimore northeast to York Haven, Pennsylvania, on the Susquehanna River.

George Winchester, president of the new railroad company, made repeated requests to the Pennsylvania General Assembly to give their approval to the charter as set up by Maryland, with permission to operate in Pennsylvania. However, the legislators—especially those from Philadelphia—did not want trade from Pennsylvania going to Baltimore. Others wanted any railroad company operating in Pennsylvania to be owned and operated by Pennsylvanians, with profits staying in Pennsylvania. For these reasons, a charter for the B&S company was initially rejected.

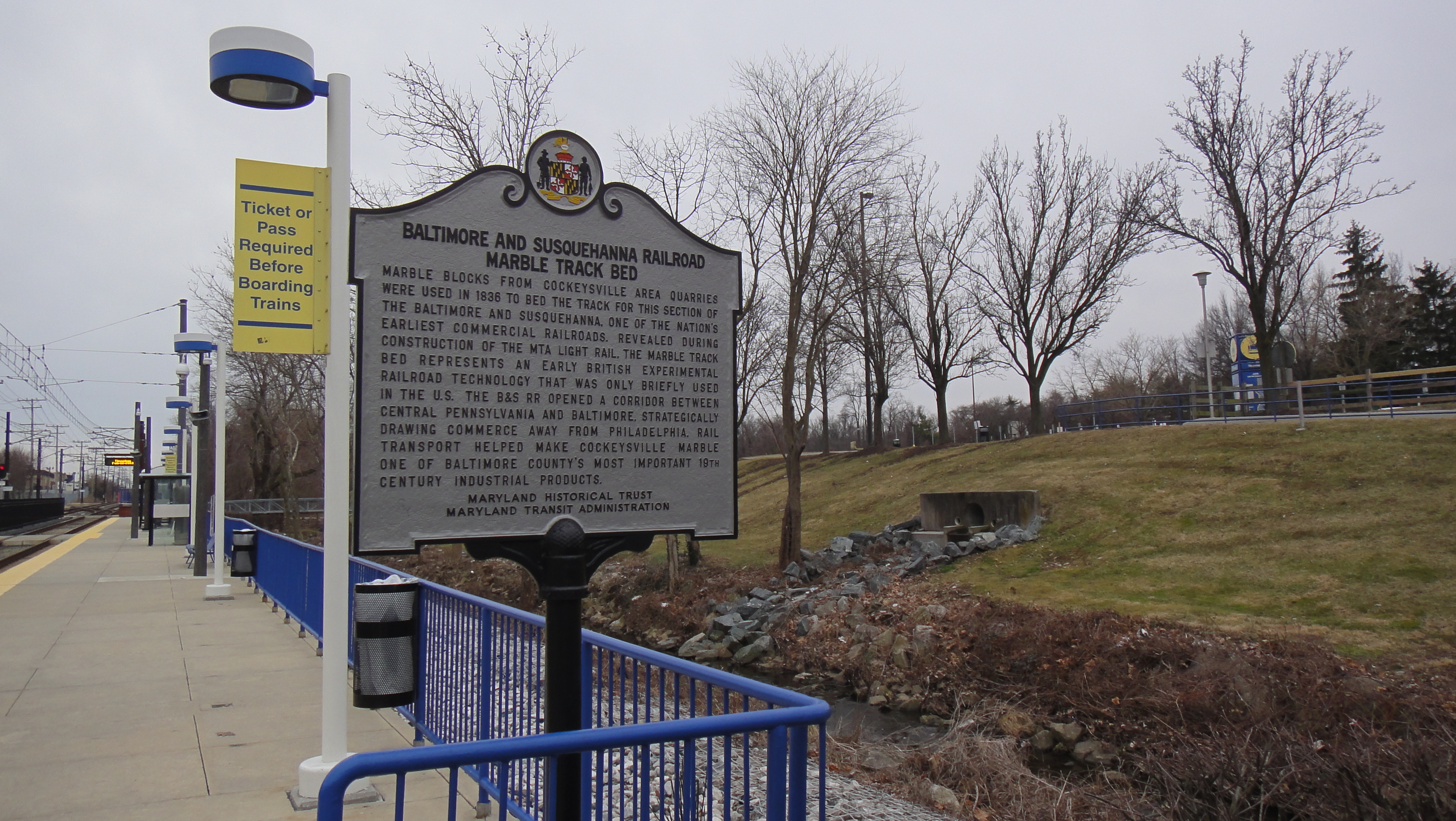
Baltimore and Susquehanna Railroad historical marker, Fairgrounds station

Nevertheless, construction of the Baltimore & Susquehanna Railroad began in 1829, following the Jones Falls valley, and in 1831 reached Roland Run, at what today is Lake Roland. Construction had not been easy—the terrain north and west of Baltimore and Philadelphia presented significant challenges for building railroads. The only routes open to them were along fast-moving streams (called “Falls” because the whole stream was rapid) twisting through narrow valleys. Jones Falls provided a more open valley than some, but to create a workable grade the track still had to cross the stream frequently, with many curves and climbing stretches in between—Robert Gunnarsson reports that the B&S route eventually averaged about two bridges for every mile of track.

On July 4, 1831, the railroad company celebrated the opening of its train service, carrying passengers pulled by horses to the Roland Run area and back to Belvedere Station in Baltimore (at or near the intersection of Guilford Avenue and Eager St today). The following year, they built a relay station near Roland Run, where fatigued horses could be exchanged for fresh ones; they called the station “Relay” (though this was sometimes confused with the Baltimore and Ohio’s station of the same name, around which the town of Relay, Maryland developed).

=== The Green Spring Branch ===
Concerned that the Pennsylvania legislature might never approve their route to the Susquehanna River, in 1830 the B&S obtained an amendment to its charter from the Maryland legislature. The charter’s wording was somewhat ambiguous, stating that the end point of the new line would be “the headwaters of the Monocacy River in the vicinity of Westminster”: Westminster, in Carroll County, is on the very eastern edge of the Monocacy’s drainage area, while the river’s headwaters are actually farther north, in the area of Gettysburg and across the state line into Pennsylvania.

In fact, the company set their sights at first only as far as Owings Mills, where several grist mills and other businesses were eager to pay for better transportation to markets. The new line started from Relay House and ran west through the Green Spring Valley, reaching the Reisterstown Road at Owings Mills in August, 1832. Connecting to the turnpike allowed the railroad to collaborate with stage companies to carry U.S. mail north from Baltimore. In the meantime, the B&S Company also built the Green Spring Hotel just east of Garrison, so that when the railroad reached that point, they could begin to carry tourists from Baltimore to the fresh air and beautiful scenery of Green Spring Valley.

While construction was ongoing, the B&S purchased its first steam locomotive, which they named the Herald. Made in England by Robert Stephenson, it arrived in autumn of 1832, but with a 0-4-0 configuration that couldn’t handle the tight curves of the Jones Falls route. The configuration was successfully adapted by using a leading 4-wheel truck that swiveled, and using just two driving wheels, for a 4-2-0 pattern. The Herald began twice-daily round trips to Green Spring Valley and Owings Mills beginning in October, 1832. This section of the line became known as the Green Spring Branch, and would later take on a life of its own.

=== The York and Maryland Line Rail Road ===
The B&S had continued to seek permission to enter Pennsylvania, and in 1831 Pennsylvania’s Governor George Wolf stepped in to broker a deal. He wanted to see trade with Baltimore rather than isolated rivalry, so with his influence the railroad and the state legislature reached an agreement. If Maryland wanted railroad access to the Susquehanna River, the Maryland legislature would have to approve completion of a canal from Chesapeake Bay to the navigable portion of the river. Maryland had wanted just such a canal for over 20 years, and they readily agreed. However, Pennsylvania lawmakers still wanted any railroad operating in the state to be a Pennsylvania-based firm. The result was the incorporation of a new company, the York & Maryland Line Railroad Company (Y&ML), on March 14, 1832.

The Baltimore & Susquehanna Railroad was given “’limited’ authority in Pennsylvania,” and with that authority, they started once again to extend their initial line northwards, reaching Timonium in 1832. That same year, in addition to constructing the branch line to Owings Mills, building the Green Spring Hotel and the relay station mentioned earlier, as well as purchasing its first locomotive, the B&S also began setting up the Bolton Station and Yard, which would become its main terminal, repair shop, and switching yards. Built on land donated by George Winchester, the first B&S president, it later became the site of the Baltimore and Ohio Railroad’s Mt. Royal Station, and eventually the Maryland Institute College of Art. The company also gained rail access to Baltimore Harbor by cooperating with the Baltimore and Ohio to construct a jointly owned track connecting Bolton Yard to the B&O line at Pratt Street, with permission to use the B&O's harbor freight terminals. Because much of the harbor line ran on city streets, however, a city ordinance allowed only the use of horses to pull freight cars to the harbor.

But after all those expenditures, the B&S could not cover the costs of further northward construction. Although the railroad had some income from the Green Spring Branch, it was also hampered financially by a provision in its original charter that allowed customers to use their own freight cars, which the B&S would then have to move at a rate lower than its own freight costs. Early investors had been disappointed by minimal returns on their investments, so people were reluctant to spend money on further railroad stock. But the State of Maryland and the City of Baltimore both gave their support, purchasing close to half of the $450,000 in shares that the B&S did sell over the next few years, and loaning the railroad a combined total of $2.7 million.

Further, the benefit of building next to swift moving streams was that their waterpower could run mills, and each mile of track laid brought the B&S to new mills and closer to new mines, quarries, and farms. Sometimes, in fact, the railroad allowed these businesses to open by giving them ways to sell their products. Although construction was intermittent because of funding issues, as the Baltimore and Susquehanna extended their track they were gradually able to reach more customers, which in turn provided money to build further north. It took three years to cover the fairly short distance to Cockeysville, arriving in 1835, but by 1837 they had laid track to the state border, north of Freeland.

At that point the York and Maryland Line officially took over construction—but the B&S crews were still laying the track, theoretically financed by the Y&ML. This surprised no one in authority; in fact, Robert Gunnarsson calls the York and Maryland Line Railroad “a paper company.” While its charge stated that the Y&ML would construct a railroad from York to the border with Maryland, it made no further stipulations, which meant anyone could use the tracks. The company had initially been capitalized at just $200,000, far less than would realistically be needed, and they also had trouble raising money. The Y&ML didn’t have enough funds to start construction until 1837—i.e., when the Baltimore and Susquehanna itself reached the state line, and then continued into Pennsylvania.

Ironically, the Y&ML used its own stock shares and bonds to pay the B&S close to $350,000 for covering construction debts. In just a few years, then, with an outright purchase of $200,000 of Y&ML stock, the B&S had control of the York and Maryland Line Railroad. It was under this corporate structure that in 1838 the York to Baltimore line was completed, including the 300-foot-long Howard Tunnel near Seven Valleys, Pennsylvania, the earliest railroad tunnel in the U.S. still in use today.

=== The Wrightsville, York, & Gettysburg Railroad ===
Although the original plan for the B&S railroad was to reach the Susquehanna River at York Haven, while they were still laying track from the Maryland state line to York the B&S directors decided to build from York to Wrightsville instead. The Susquehanna and Tidewater Canal, which had been part of the bargaining for access to Pennsylvania to begin with, was expected to link Chesapeake Bay with the upper Susquehanna at Wrightsville. The Columbia-Wrightsville Bridge, already in place, provided a way across the river to Columbia, which was an important junction between Pennsylvania’s canal system to the west and the Philadelphia and Columbia Railroad to the east. This new plan led to the incorporation of the Wrightsville, York, & Gettysburg Railroad (WY&G) by the Pennsylvania legislature in 1837.

Right from the beginning, the WY&G corporate charter stipulated that the York and Maryland Line Railroad would have permission to use the new company’s tracks, as long as the Y&ML gave reciprocal permission to the Wrightsville, York, and Gettysburg. As with the Y&ML railroad, the Baltimore and Susquehanna company loaned money to build the new line, starting from York in 1838 and reaching Wrightsville in 1840. Similarly, the WY&G used its own stock to cover its debt to the B&S, with a similar result: beginning in 1839, the Baltimore & Susquehanna Railroad controlled the Wrightsville, York, & Gettysburg. The new line from York to Wrightsville completed the original plan to create easy transportation of goods from the Susquehanna River to Baltimore—a plan which greatly succeeded, to the dismay of many officials in Pennsylvania, but to the profit of Wrightsville and all the other towns along the B&S route, including Baltimore itself. However, expenses continued for the B&S, with the purchase of eleven locomotives from 1837-1839, moving from the single Herald to creating a full fleet of engines as their total amount of trackage increased significantly.

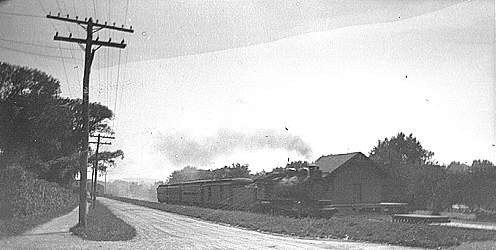
Northern Central Railway train at Lutherville, Maryland, during World War I (1917–1918)

=== The York and Cumberland Railroad ===
When the Wrightsville, York, and Gettysburg was completed, the United States was in the midst of a major economic depression, so no further construction happened for a few years. But the Baltimore and Susquehanna Company still wanted to connect to York Haven – the source of the original request that led to the railroad’s creation – and they also had their eyes set on Harrisburg, the Pennsylvania state capitol. At Harrisburg they would have important links to two different railroads: the Lancaster and Philadelphia Railroad going east, and the Cumberland Valley Railroad reaching southwest to Chambersburg. Ambitious plans were also underway to build a railroad west from Harrisburg to connect Philadelphia to Pittsburgh; the Pennsylvania Railroad’s incorporation in April 1846, then, made Harrisburg an even more strategic terminus than Wrightsville.

The Pennsylvania legislature chartered the York and Cumberland Railroad Company (Y&C) on April 21, 1846, to connect the York & Maryland Line with the Cumberland Valley Railroad somewhere north of Mechanicsburg. The Y&C had trouble raising enough money within the state of Pennsylvania to begin construction, so its stock was made available on the open market. Investors in Baltimore purchased over $700,000 in Y&C stocks and bonds, most of which were then sold to the Baltimore & Susquehanna Company. Once again, the B&S had financial control of a separate but extending railroad company; “Articles of Agreement” drawn up and signed on January 21, 1850, gave the Baltimore & Susquehanna outright operational control of the York and Cumberland Railroad. Beginning that year, track was laid north from York to the Susquehanna River at York Haven, and then along the river to meet the Cumberland Valley Railroad at Lemoyne (then called “Bridgeport”). Service on the new line began in 1851. One significant difference, however, was that the Baltimore and Susquehanna Railroad had to lease the York and Cumberland tracks in order to use them—a cost added to many others.

=== The Susquehanna Railroad and financial difficulties ===
While the B&S had effectively gained control of three other railroads, it had also financed the construction of their lines. The state of Maryland and city of Baltimore had provided support, but much of it was in the form of loans which, of course, had to be repaid. In fact, the interest alone that the B&S owed the state of Maryland was $113,000, but the railroad could only pay $40,000 annually. In addition, the B&S was continually hampered by having to pull customers’ privately owned freight cars at rates below cost. So they looked farther north, to the rich coal fields of central Pennsylvania, hoping to increase revenues by extending their lines north of the York and Cumberland Railroad.

To accomplish this, the Susquehanna Railroad (SRR) was chartered on April 14, 1851, and authorized to build upstream along the Susquehanna to Halifax, Millersburg, and Sunbury, eventually reaching Williamsport. Like the other new railroads, its initial stock did not sell well, so the Baltimore and Susquehanna Railroad and the York and Cumberland loaned significant amounts to the SRR in exchange for stock in the new company. In 1852 and 1853 the Pennsylvania legislature authorized the York & Cumberland Railroad, the Wrightsville, York, and Gettysburg line, and/or the York and Maryland Line, separately or together, to subscribe or loan up to $500,000 to the capital-starved Susquehanna Railroad, and to permit the counties and boroughs along the way to contribute funds. The cap on loans and investments was lifted later that same year, and Baltimore committed to supporting the railroad, so initial construction got underway.

However, the railroad line wasn't built. Beginning in November 1853, the route north was graded to Millersburg, and partially graded to Sunbury, at a cost of $800,000, but track was only laid as far as Maryville--construction came to a halt in 1854.

The Baltimore and Susquehanna had been dealing with several issues resulting in major expenses. Their success was part of the problem: the volume and weight of the traffic they were carrying had gone beyond what the original wooden rails could handle, causing several derailments. When first constructing their lines, the company’s strategy was to build lightly and quickly in order to begin generating income as soon as possible—the directors had seen the Baltimore and Ohio Railroad slowed down by expensive stone trackbed and bridges and wanted to avoid those problems. But as their business grew they purchased and hauled increasingly heavy equipment; in 1851, for example, they bought the first of nineteen 0-8-0 “Camel” locomotives, which were powerful but quite large and heavy. Almost every bridge had to be rebuilt, tight curves had to be straightened out, and miles of original wooden rails covered with strap iron had to be replaced with “T”-shaped rails of rolled iron made in England. Rail replacement began in 1852, and by 1854 a good portion of the tracks on the main route between Baltimore and Lemoyne had been upgraded, with yet more financial support from the Maryland legislature. Work on replacing the bridges would go on for several more years.

Belvedere Station in Baltimore was also being overrun by the increased number of trains and passengers, so in 1848 the company began building a new station for passenger service. The Calvert Street Station, located on North Calvert Street at East Franklin Street, was designed by architects Niernsee and Neilson and completed in 1850. Its Italianate-style structure of stucco-covered brick, with many arched windows and doorways, and two distinctive towers, quickly became an iconic image for the Baltimore and Susquehanna Railroad and also for its successor, the Northern Central Railway.

Beginning back in 1840, the B&S had also started to build its own line to Baltimore Harbor, a process that turned out to be quite messy and expensive with little return. Part of this line was rebuilt in 1847 on private property, to try to get rails off of city streets so that locomotives could pull the cars rather than using horses. Beginning in 1850 the B&S had purchased parcels of land in the Canton area, on the northeast side of the harbor, and began extending their track to that area. However, several lawsuits and then an injunction requested by the Baltimore and Ohio put a stop to that line—the Canton harbor project had to be abandoned, and the B&S had to continue using horses to move freight to the City Dock.

Another major blow to the company involved a rail collision that occurred on July 4, 1854. 30 passengers would lose their lives and over 100 others were injured.

The expense of building the Susquehanna Railroad, beginning in 1853, combined with all these projects, incidents, and their associated costs, led to bankruptcy for the Baltimore and Susquehanna Company and its associated lines. Acting in tandem, in 1854 the legislatures of both Pennsylvania and Maryland approved a consolidation of the Baltimore & Susquehanna Railroad, the York & Maryland Line, the York & Cumberland Railroad, and the Susquehanna Railroad. Maryland converted the railroads’ debts to a single mortgage that required annual payments of $90,000, though if the new company could pay $1,500,000 over a ten-year period that would satisfy the full loan. Articles of Union were finalized on December 4, 1854, and filed in both states, creating the Northern Central Railway Company (NCRY), which took control of these four affiliated railroads on January 1, 1855. The Wrightsville, York, and Columbia Railroad was not officially included in the merger, though it was still operated by the Northern Central Railway until 1870; at that point it was sold to the Pennsylvania Railroad, which by then had also gained control of the NCRY.

=== The Western Maryland Railroad ===
Another significant railroad was the by-product of all this corporate maneuvering—the Western Maryland Railway (WM). Once the Baltimore and Susquehanna Company bargained their way across the Pennsylvania-Maryland border and linked with the York and Maryland Line Railroad, they stopped maintaining the Green Spring Branch. The track deteriorated, to the point where it could be used only by horse-drawn trains, and only in the summer. However, towns on the originally planned route to Westminster had expected and wanted railroad service. At their request, in 1846 the Maryland legislature authorized the B&S “or any new company organized to do the work” to repair the tracks from Relay to Owings Mills. Eventually this resulted in the formation of the Baltimore, Carroll and Frederick Railroad in 1852; in 1853 the company changed its name to the Western Maryland Railway. Their goal was to build from the end of the line at Owings Mills towards Hagerstown, where they could connect to the Cumberland Railroad.

After exploring options, the Western Maryland Company purchased the Green Spring Branch from the B&S on October 1, 1857, with the right to use the B&S tracks from Relay in to Baltimore. If they stopped using the branch line, however, it would revert back to the Baltimore and Susquehanna. The Western Maryland refurbished the track from Relay to Owings Mills, then extended it to Westminster and Union Bridge, finally reaching Hagerstown in 1872. The following year, they did construct their own line in to Baltimore from Garrison, so in 1873 the Green Spring Branch was returned to the Northern Central Railway, successor to the B&S.

The Baltimore and Susquehanna was also involved with another railroad that would become part of the Western Maryland. Beginning in October 1852, the B&S contracted to operate the Hanover Branch Railroad, which had been incorporated independently in 1847 and constructed from Hanover, Pennsylvania, to connect with the York & Maryland Line at Hanover Junction. In 1855 the Hanover Branch company took over its own operations. It eventually merged with the Gettysburg Railroad, which had built a line between Hanover and Gettysburg; in 1886 they were acquired by the Western Maryland line.

== The Northern Central Railway ==
=== Consolidation and expansion ===
When the Northern Central Railroad took over operations of the four consolidated lines, it also took on most of their debts. A major exception was that the city of Baltimore agreed to forego the money it had loaned to the Baltimore and Susquehanna Railroad, on two conditions: that the new railroad would finish construction of the line to Sunbury, and that the NCRY would also build a different line to Baltimore harbor, using a new route to avoid legal hassles. The new railroad’s charter also mandated that its whole length would have two sets of tracks – the need for which had been horrifically demonstrated on July 4, 1854, when a holiday excursion train collided head-on with a York local, killing thirty-five people and injuring over a hundred others.

Using its initial stock outlay of $8 million, with another $2.5 million added later, the NCRY resumed construction on the Sunbury route that same year; by August, 1858, the line had bridged the Susquehanna at Dauphin and reached the southern edge of Sunbury. Gunnarsson writes that, "according to some sources," from 1856 to 1858 trains running north towards Sunbury were diverted across the Susquehanna River at Herndon via the Trevorton Bridge to Port Trevorton, Pennsylvania. From there, passengers boarded canal boats and continued the journey to Sunbury on the Pennsylvania Canal, until 1858 when the rail line to Sunbury was completed. On August 18, 1858, the NCRY was able to open rail service between Baltimore and Sunbury.

Completing that final stretch also allowed the NCRY to connect with several short feeder-line railroads, such as the Lykens Valley Railroad and the Trevorton Coal & Railroad Company, which were built to bring coal directly from mines east of the Susquehanna to rivers or canals linked to Pennsylvania’s “Main Line” canal system. While these feeder lines had improved from their early horse-drawn days, mine owners were still eager to link directly with the Northern Central Railway for quicker and smoother transportation to markets. Once in Sunbury, the NCRY could also connect with the Shamokin Valley and Pottsville Railroad, which carried coal from mines in the areas of Shamokin and Mount Carmel. The coal traffic would become a major source of revenue for the railroad.

However, the Northern Central Railway had not yet actually made it in to Sunbury – rather, they were stopped at the edge of town by city officials who were allied with Philadelphia legislators and unhappy about the NCRY’s success in shipping Pennsylvania products to Baltimore. The Sunbury and Erie Railroad had been issued a charter in 1852 specifically to reclaim some of that trade, with the provision that if the Susquehanna Railroad could not complete construction to Sunbury, then the Sunbury and Erie could build a line connecting Sunbury and Harrisburg. In fact the Sunbury group tried to do that almost immediately, even as the Susquehanna Railroad was building north. Although their claim-jumping attempt was quickly stopped (one of the Susquehanna's major stockholders, William Fisher Packer, was a future governor of Pennsylvania), city and railroad officials in Sunbury still saw the NCRY as a hostile intruder. Because of this, passengers and freight reaching Sunbury on the NCRY had to be transferred to carriages or wagons, which would take them several blocks northeast to the Sunbury and Erie’s midtown terminal.

By the end of 1858, however, the Northern Central Railway was operating the Sunbury and Erie Railroad. Like many early railroad companies, the Sunbury and Erie had trouble raising enough funds to cover the unforeseen high costs of construction. They had successfully built tracks to Williamsport and were trying to extend their line farther west, but they didn’t have any money for actually running a railroad. Originally the Catawissa, Williamsport & Erie Railroad had a contract to provide railroad service on the Sunbury and Erie’s tracks, but once the NCRY did connect with the Sunbury and Erie, the NCRY was given that contract; the two companies agreed that when the Sunbury and Erie had acquired enough rolling stock, they would share use of the tracks between Williamsport and Harrisburg.

=== Success and foreclosure ===
As a consolidated company, the Northern Central Railway did very well in many ways: from 1856 to 1860 its business saw an 80% increase. Its operations became more organized and efficient, with standardized schedules that reduced both travel and shipping times. The company also added telegraph service, putting telegraph lines along its whole route, with telegraphing facilities in every major station by the start of 1860. And, with links to several other railroads as well as Pennsylvania’s canal system, it had established an extensive and profitable network – eventually reaching from Baltimore to Lake Erie.

But while its business was booming, the railroad was struggling financially. The NCRY was caught in the same cycle of having to construct the new line to Sunbury while managing other expenses and heavy debt. The earlier companies’ thin financial margins meant they had done only the minimum required maintenance. Throughout 1858, the remaining wood and strap-iron rails on the main line had to be replaced with rolled-iron “T” rails, though it would take years before all the sidings and freight yards had been upgraded. The bridge-building project started by the Baltimore and Susquehanna had never been completed, so between 1855 and 1859 more than 75 bridges also had to be replaced.

As had happened with the Baltimore and Susquehanna, even success was hurting the Northern Central—as they became a major coal-shipping firm, they also had to purchase more locomotives and freight cars, as well as passenger cars. The amount of coal carried overwhelmed their shipping facilities in Baltimore harbor, which were still limited by having to use horse-drawn trains on city streets. Once again the NCRY tried to build an off-street line to the Canton harbor area, only to be met with the same legal difficulties and challenges in obtaining right-of-way.

The Northern Central Railway ended the year 1860 with debts of $2.85 million but only $283,000 to go towards paying interest—it could not cover the annual $90,000 payment on the mortgage held by the state of Maryland. In fact, the state sought foreclosure late in 1860, a financial disaster that was narrowly avoided only by a loan of $120,000 from the private company of the NCRY’s own president, John Sterett Gittings. The state moved again to foreclose in 1861, but it was at that point that the Pennsylvania Railroad stepped in and acquired a controlling interest in the Northern Central's stock. Thereafter, the Northern Central operated as a subsidiary of the Pennsylvania Railroad until the latter's demise in the late 20th century.

== Operation as a Pennsylvania Railroad subsidiary ==
=== Build-up to the Civil War and the PRR takeover ===
The Northern Central Railway had been involved in one of the Civil War’s core issues years before the war began: as a north-south train, escaped slaves often traveled on the NCRY, making it a part of the Underground Railroad. While the Baltimore and Susquehanna Railroad officially obeyed the Fugitive Slave Act of 1850, in helping owners bring captured fugitives back south, quite a number of employees or residents along its route gave refuge to people fleeing enslavement.

But as armed conflict became increasingly likely, the Northern Central was also affected financially: investors grew hesitant about keeping stock in a railroad so close to the expected military front. While the railroad’s strategic location would help it earn money by moving troops and materiel, its location would also make it vulnerable to attack. Already in 1860, aware of the railroad’s financial vulnerability, Senator Simon Cameron of Pennsylvania had approached J. Edgar Thomson and Thomas A. Scott, the president and vice-president of the Pennsylvania Railroad, proposing that if the PRR were to buy stock in the Northern Central, they could jointly control the NCRY. As former president of the Susquehanna Railroad, Simon Cameron was already a major stockholder in the Northern Central. A corrupt but powerful politician and businessman, he owned the company that built the line from Harrisburg to Sunbury.

Abraham Lincoln’s election in November 1860 on an anti-slavery platform increased tensions and further troubled stockholders. John W. Garrett, president of the rival Baltimore and Ohio Railroad, had slowly been purchasing significant amounts of stock in the Northern Central, but shortly after Lincoln’s election, in early 1861, he dumped his NCRY stock. The Pennsylvania Railroad and Simon Cameron jumped at the chance to pick it up. PRR president Thomson individually purchased what amounted to just over 28% of the NCRY’s total stock. The Pennsylvania Railroad company also purchased some of Garrett’s stock, which was eventually combined with Thomson’s shares. In 1863, another 2500 NCRY shares became available on the stock market in London, which the PRR also purchased, gaining a controlling interest of 33.79% of all NCRY stock.

In the meantime, Simon Cameron had been named Secretary of War in Abraham Lincoln’s new administration, a reward for bringing in Pennsylvania’s support for Lincoln at the Republican Convention. Once in office, he used his power to give PRR vice-president Thomas Scott the position of Assistant Secretary of War, and he also arranged for business to be given to the Northern Central Railway—of which he was still a major stockholder. He was not very secretive in his dealings, and by January 1862 he was removed from office in the wake of significant allegations of fraud and corruption. But the War Department business had given the Northern Central enough cash to stop the state of Maryland’s second attempt at foreclosure in 1861, and even to pay off that debt completely in 1862.

But before President-Elect Lincoln took office, the Northern Central Railway was originally scheduled to be part of the highly publicized whistle-stop train ride organized to celebrate his inauguration. Having started days earlier from Springfield, Illinois, Lincoln’s train reached Harrisburg late on February 21, 1861. He planned to take the Northern Central to Baltimore, then transfer to the Baltimore and Ohio for the final leg into Washington, D.C. But as a slave state, Maryland was not friendly territory for Lincoln, and fears arose of a plot to assassinate him while in Baltimore. Lincoln’s security staff, including Allan Pinkerton, decided to change both the route and the schedule of the trip. From Harrisburg they took the Philadelphia, Wilmington and Baltimore Railroad instead, to its station on President Street rather than the NCRY’s Calvert Street Station. Further, to prevent detection they cut telegraph lines between Harrisburg and Baltimore, blacked out the train, and had guards stationed along the route. While historians today have significant questions about any actual organized conspiracy (later called the “Baltimore Plot”), there had been plenty of fiery statements in Baltimore against Lincoln and supporting the Confederacy, so Lincoln’s staff decided not to take any risks. Lincoln arrived in Baltimore at 3:00 a.m. on February 22, quietly transferred to the B&O’s Camden Station, then traveled safely on to Washington, avoiding any assassination attempt.

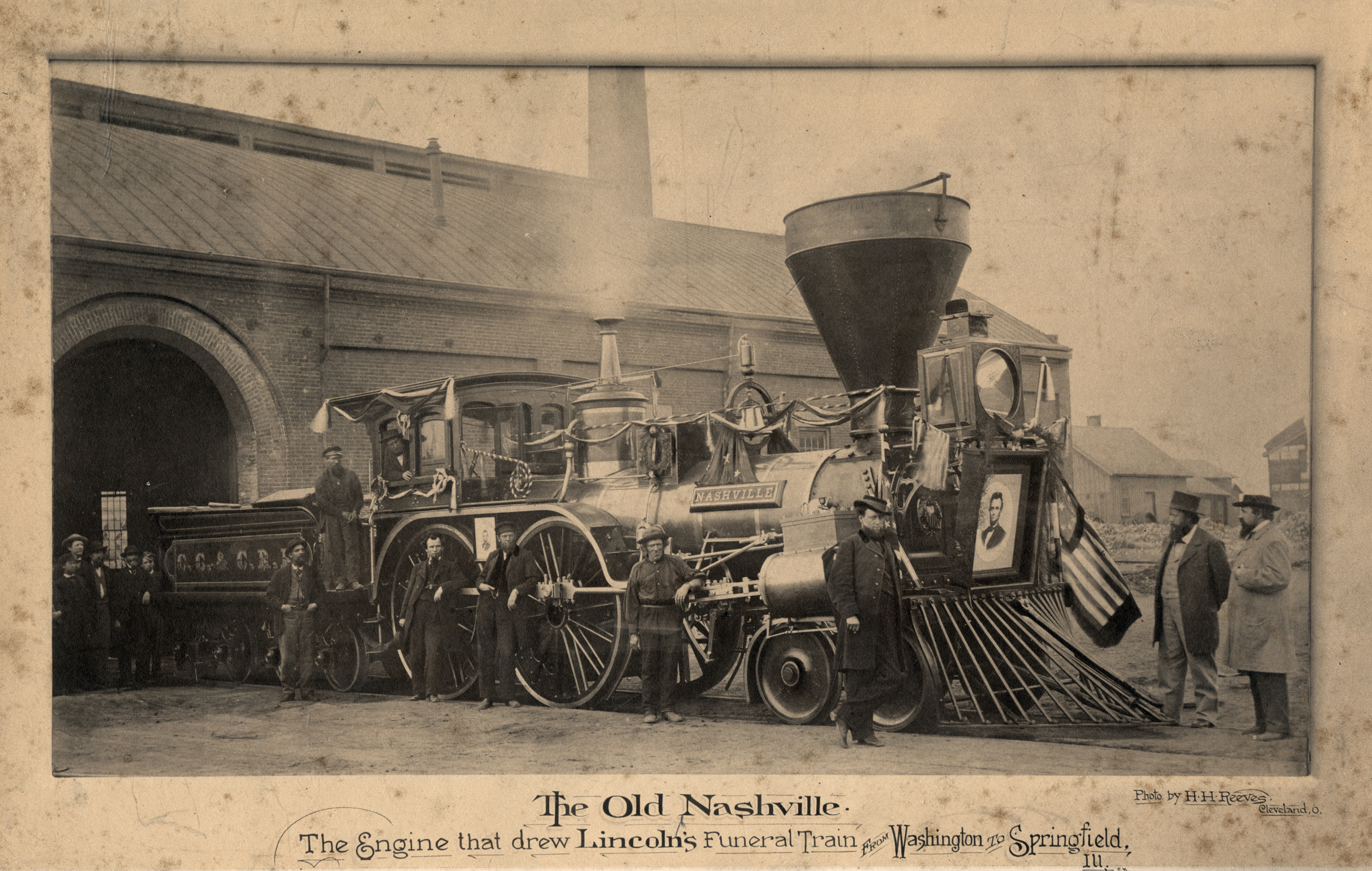
Lincoln's funeral train carried his remains, as well as 300 mourners and the casket of his son William, on the Northern Central Railway in April, 1865

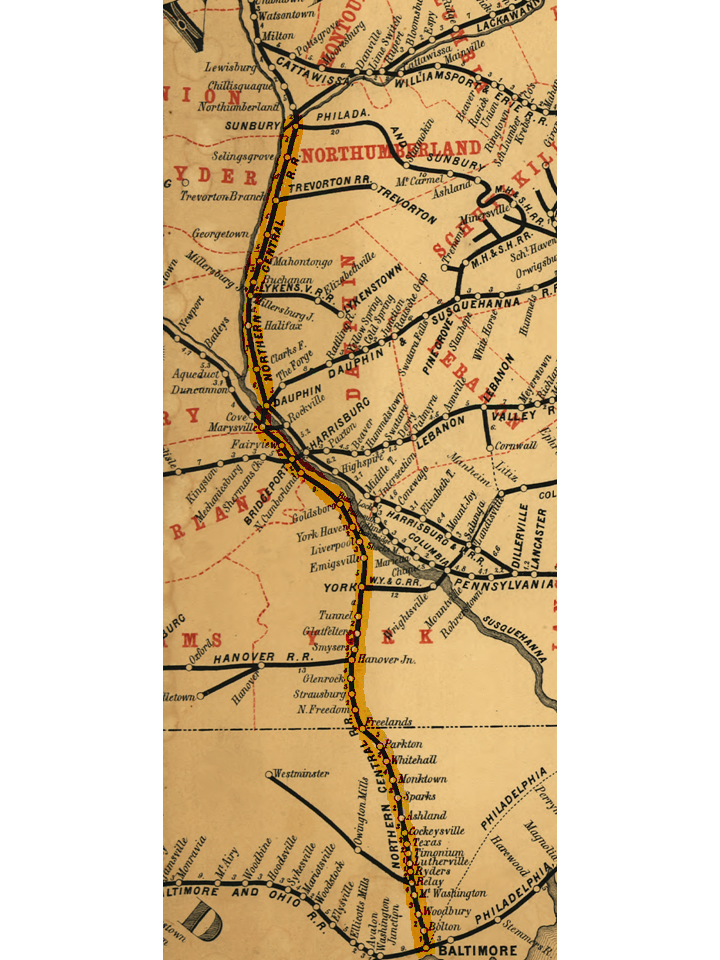
1863 map showing crossing of the Susquehanna River on the Marysville Bridge. Traffic was later routed over the Rockville Bridge.

=== The Civil War ===
During the Civil War, the Pennsylvania Railroad-controlled Northern Central served as a major transportation route for supplies, food, clothing, and materiel, as well as troops heading to the South from Camp Curtin and other Northern military training stations. During the 1863 Gettysburg campaign, Confederate Major General Jubal A. Early raided the NCRY in York, burning some rolling stock and a few machine shops in the rail yard. To impair traffic between Baltimore and Harrisburg, his cavalry destroyed a large number of bridges in York County originally constructed by the B&S. They were quickly rebuilt by Herman Haupt and the U.S. Military Railroad in conjunction with the NCRY. Traffic resumed shortly thereafter, and thousands of wounded soldiers from the Battle of Gettysburg, including Union Maj. Gen. Daniel Sickles, were evacuated via the Northern Central to hospitals in Harrisburg, Baltimore, York, and elsewhere.

The Northern Central was attacked again on July 10, 1864, when a 130-man Confederate cavalry detachment attacked the line near Cockeysville, under orders from Gen. Bradley T. Johnson. After cutting telegraph wires along Harford Road, they encamped at Towson overnight. The next day, the Confederate cavalry skirmished with a smaller force of Union cavalry along York Road before heading west to rejoin Gen. Johnson's main force.

Abraham Lincoln traveled on the Northern Central on his way to deliver the Gettysburg Address in November 1863, changing trains in Hanover Junction, Pennsylvania. After Lincoln's assassination, his body was transported via the same rails on the funeral train's journey from Washington, D.C., to Springfield, Illinois. The nine-car train departed Washington, D.C., on April 21, 1865, and arrived at Baltimore's Camden Station at 10 a.m. on the B&O Railroad. After public viewing of the President's remains, the train departed Baltimore on the Northern Central at 3 p.m. and arrived at Harrisburg at 8:20 p.m., with a brief stop at York.

In 1873, the NCRY opened its Charles Street Station, and the Union Railroad of Baltimore opened a new line connecting to the station. This 9.62 mile (15.48 km) railroad gave the NCRY access to the Canton area, where it established a shipping terminal on the Inner Harbor. The line also completed a crucial link in central Baltimore between the NCRY, the PW&B and the Baltimore and Potomac Railroad. In February 1882 the Northern Central acquired the Union Railroad. The Union Railroad link enabled the PRR to operate through trains between Philadelphia, Baltimore and Washington, D.C. Today this PRR system is part of the Northeast Corridor.

In 1898, the NCRY built the Millersburg Passenger Rail Station.

== 20th century ==
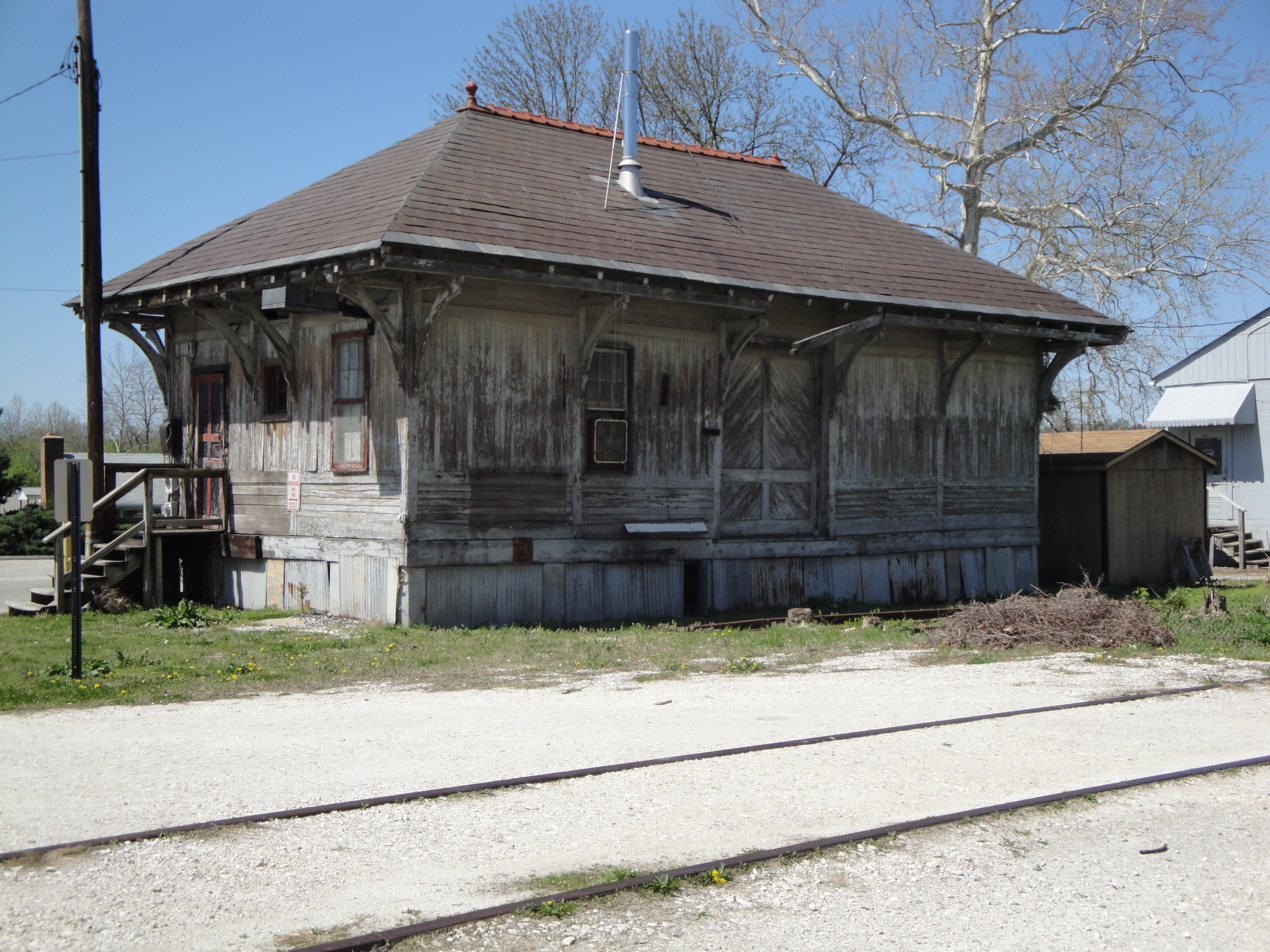
Cockeysville freight station, built 1892

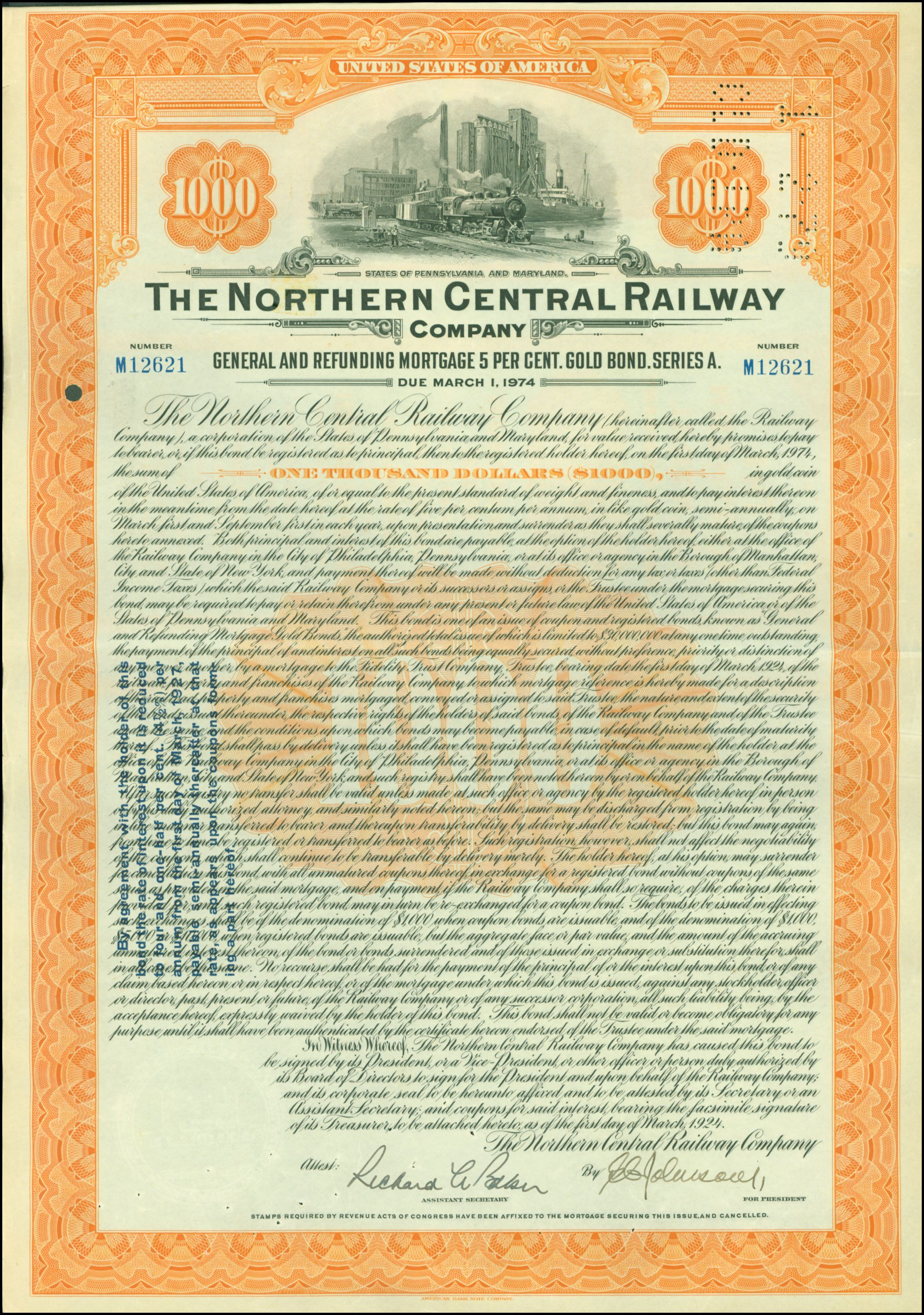
Gold Bond of the Northern Central Railway Company, issued 1. March 1924

The Pennsylvania Railroad's Northern Central line was double-tracked and equipped with block signals between Baltimore and Harrisburg by World War I. The line carried heavy passenger and freight traffic until the 1950s. On-line freight included flour, paper, milk, farm products, coal, and less-than-carload shipments between such settlements as White Hall, Parkton, Bentley Springs, Lutherville, and the city of Baltimore.

Local commuter service, referred to as the "Parkton local", operated over the 28 miles (45 km) between Calvert Station in Baltimore and Parkton, Maryland. Long distance passenger trains equipped with sleepers and dining cars were also operated by the PRR over the line from Baltimore Penn Station to Buffalo, Toronto, Chicago, and St. Louis, with through-sleeping car service as far as Houston. Much of the PRR through freight service to points west was routed via its electrified Port Road Branch along the Susquehanna River to Enola Yard in Harrisburg, however, instead of the Northern Central line.

With the decline in rail passenger and freight service in the 1950s, accelerated by the completion of Interstate 83, the "Parkton locals" were dropped in 1959 and the line was reduced from double-track to single-track. The Red Arrow The Washington, D.C., section to Detroit ended service in 1960.

Some long-distance trains, such as the General (to Chicago), the Penn Texas (to St. Louis) and the Buffalo Day Express (to Buffalo), continued to operate until the late 1960s. In 1972, when Hurricane Agnes caused bridge damage and washouts along the line, all operations ceased. One of the oldest rail lines in the country at the time, it had run for a total of 134 years.

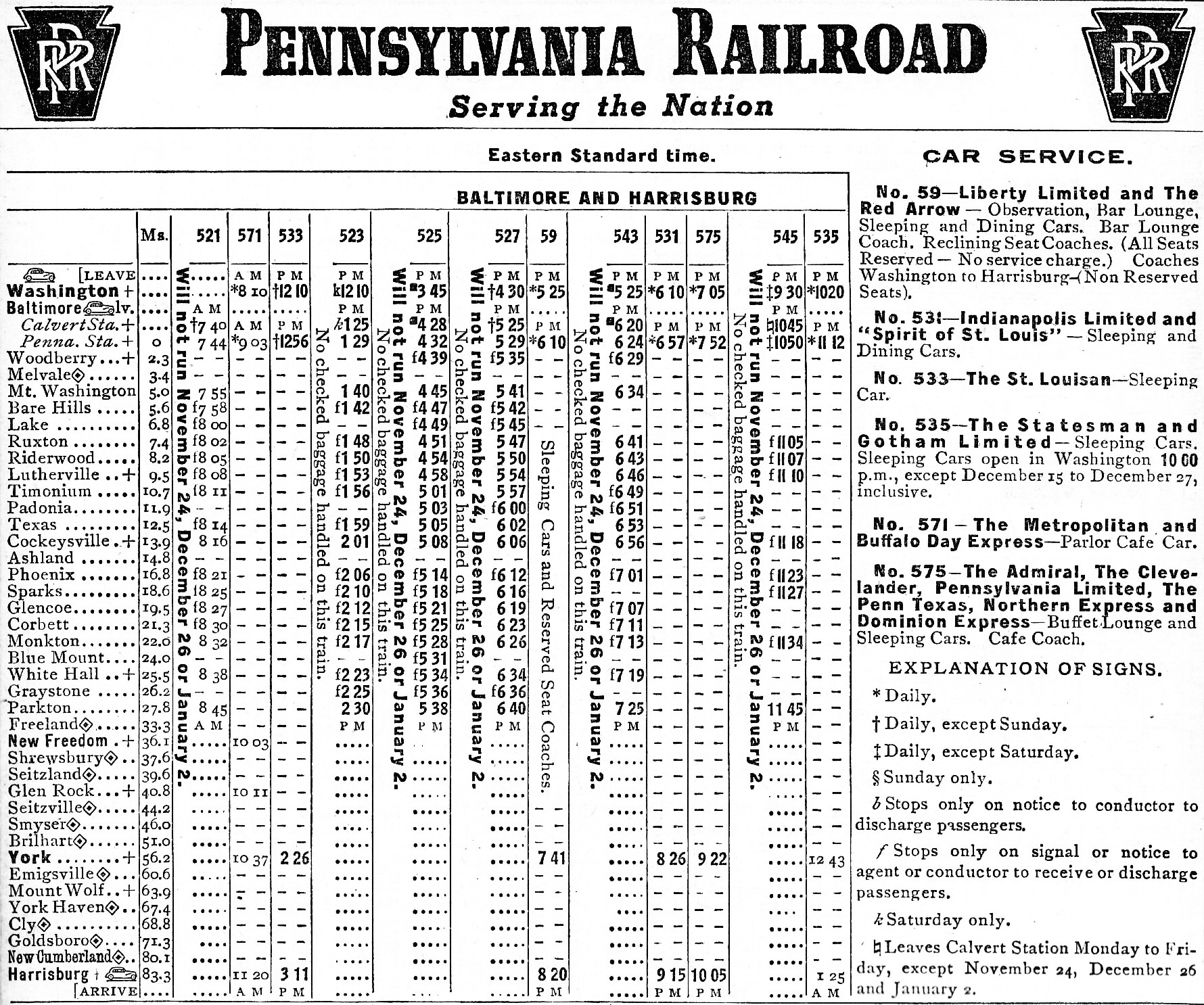
Pennsylvania Railroad schedule on the Northern Central line, 1955

=== Penn Central and aftermath ===
In 1968, the PRR merged with the New York Central railroad, to form the Penn Central (PC). The Penn Central filed for bankruptcy protection in 1970. It operated under court supervision until 1976, when its lines were transferred to Conrail under the Railroad Revitalization and Regulatory Reform Act.

After sustaining damage along the main line due to Hurricane Agnes, the Penn Central petitioned the Interstate Commerce Commission to allow it to abandon the railroad south of York. The section of the line between York and New Freedom was acquired by the Pennsylvania Department of Transportation in June 1973. The Maryland section of the abandoned line was purchased by Baltimore County in the mid-1970's.

A spur of the Spirit of St. Louis, which later became the National Limited, ran along the Washington, D.C.-Harrisburg corridor until 1979.

== Legacy today ==
A 13-mile segment of the former Northern Central Railway between Baltimore and Cockeysville continued to be operated by Conrail successor Norfolk Southern until 2005. Rebuilt and electrified in the late 1980s for the now double-tracked Baltimore Light Rail system, NS local freights were permitted to operate over the Light Rail line during late-night hours when no passenger trains were running by agreement with the Maryland Transit Administration.

=== Rail trails ===
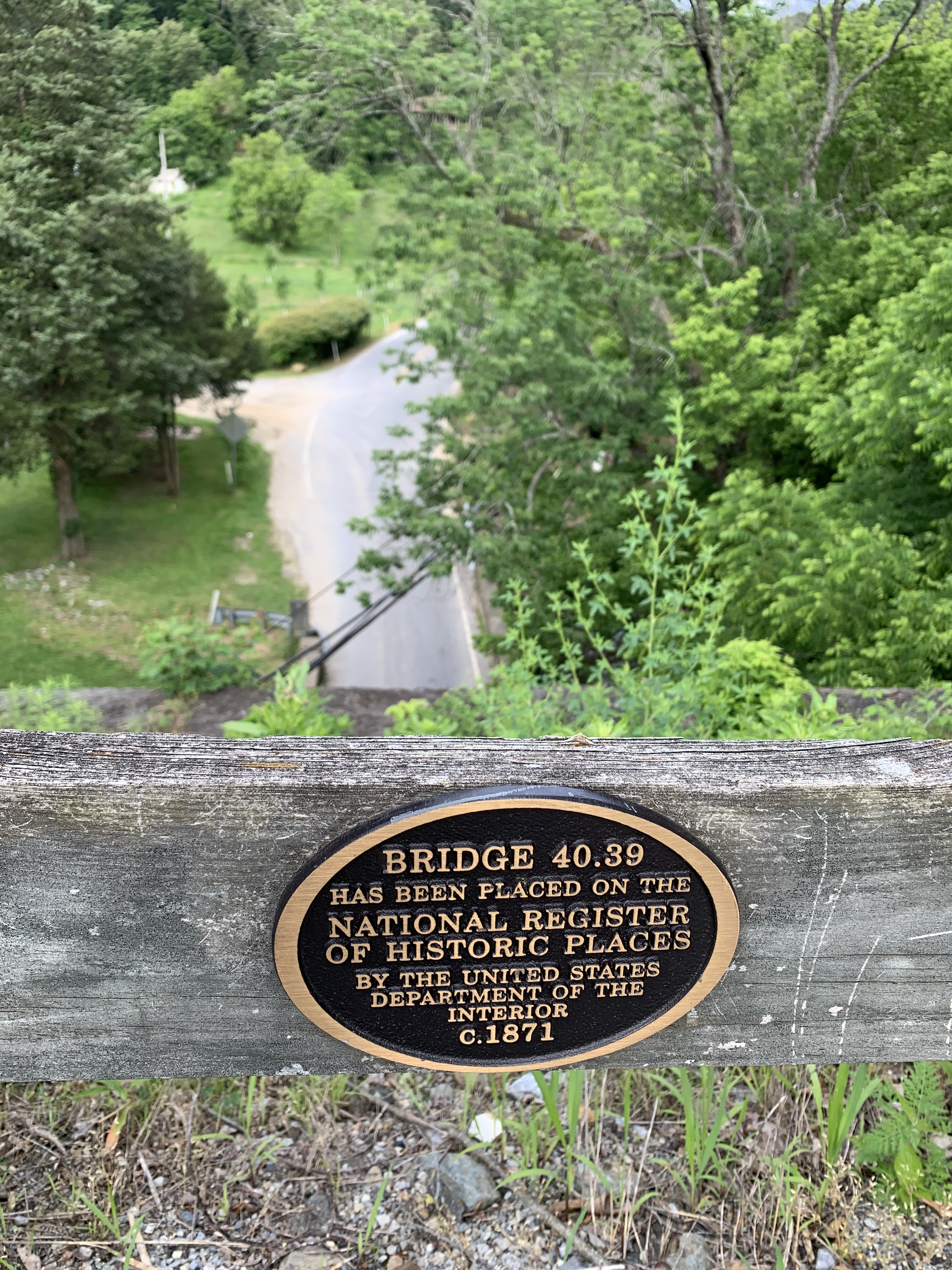
NCR Trail Bridge 40.39 Plaque

The section of the line between York and New Freedom was acquired by the Pennsylvania Department of Transportation in June 1973. The York County Heritage Rail Trail was used by cyclists as early as 1978, although it was not paved until the 1990s.

The Maryland Department of Natural Resources converted the corridor north of Cockeysville into the Torrey C. Brown Rail Trail (popularly known as the NCR Trail), which opened to the public in 1984. At the Mason–Dixon line, the trail connects to the York County Heritage Rail Trail.

In York County, the Bridge 182+42, Bridge 5+92, Bridge 634, South Road Bridge, Howard Tunnel, and New Freedom Railroad Station are listed on the National Register of Historic Places.

=== Heritage railway ===
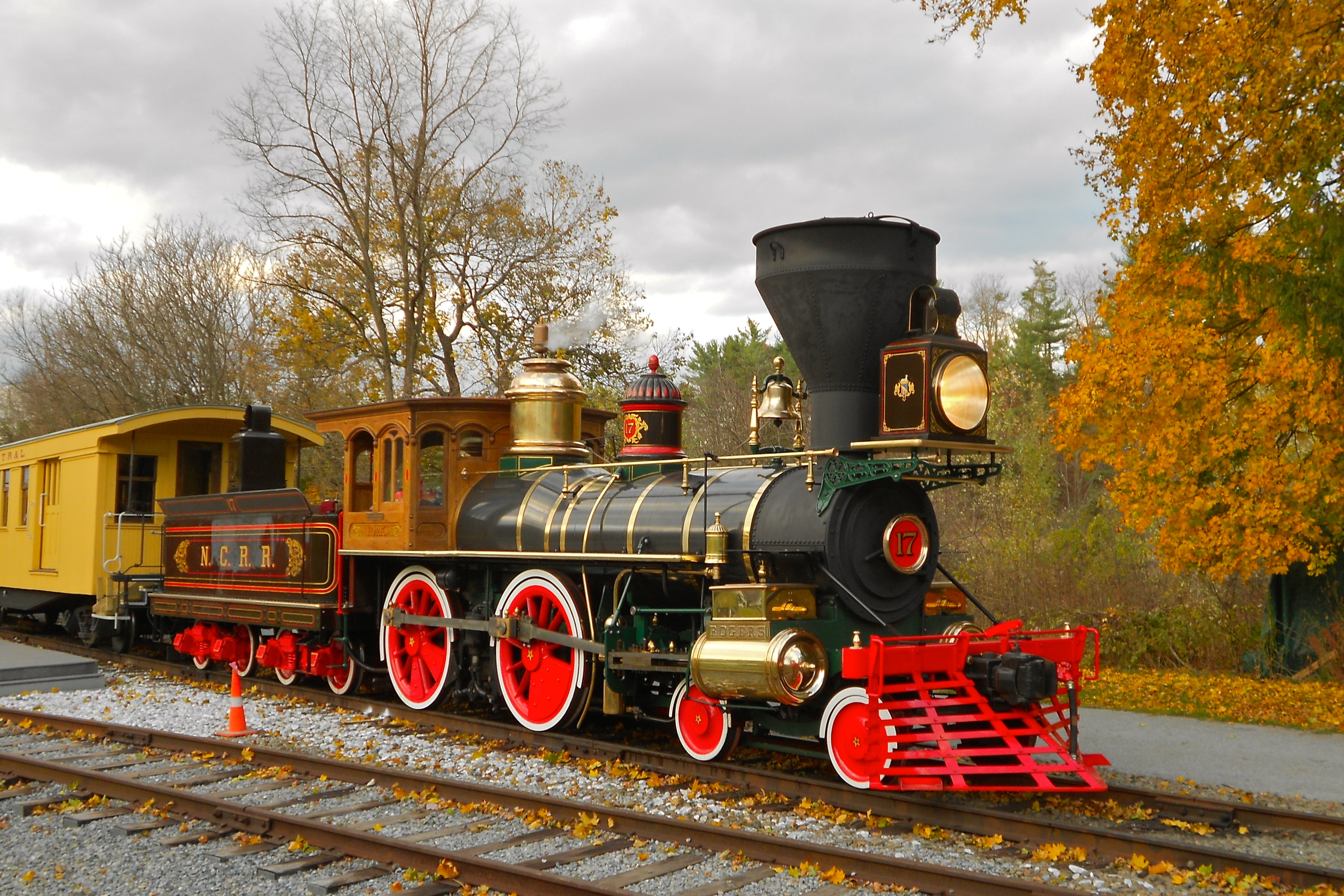
Northern Central Railway 17 York

A heritage railway operated on the NCRY line as a dinner train in the mid-1990s to the early 2000s.

In 2013, the Northern Central Railway of York (then known as Steam Into History) began operations between New Freedom and Hanover Junction, operating a replica of a Civil War-era 4-4-0 steam locomotive.

== See also ==
- List of defunct Maryland railroads
- List of defunct Pennsylvania railroads
