= Calvert Street Station =

Rail station in Baltimore, Maryland, USA

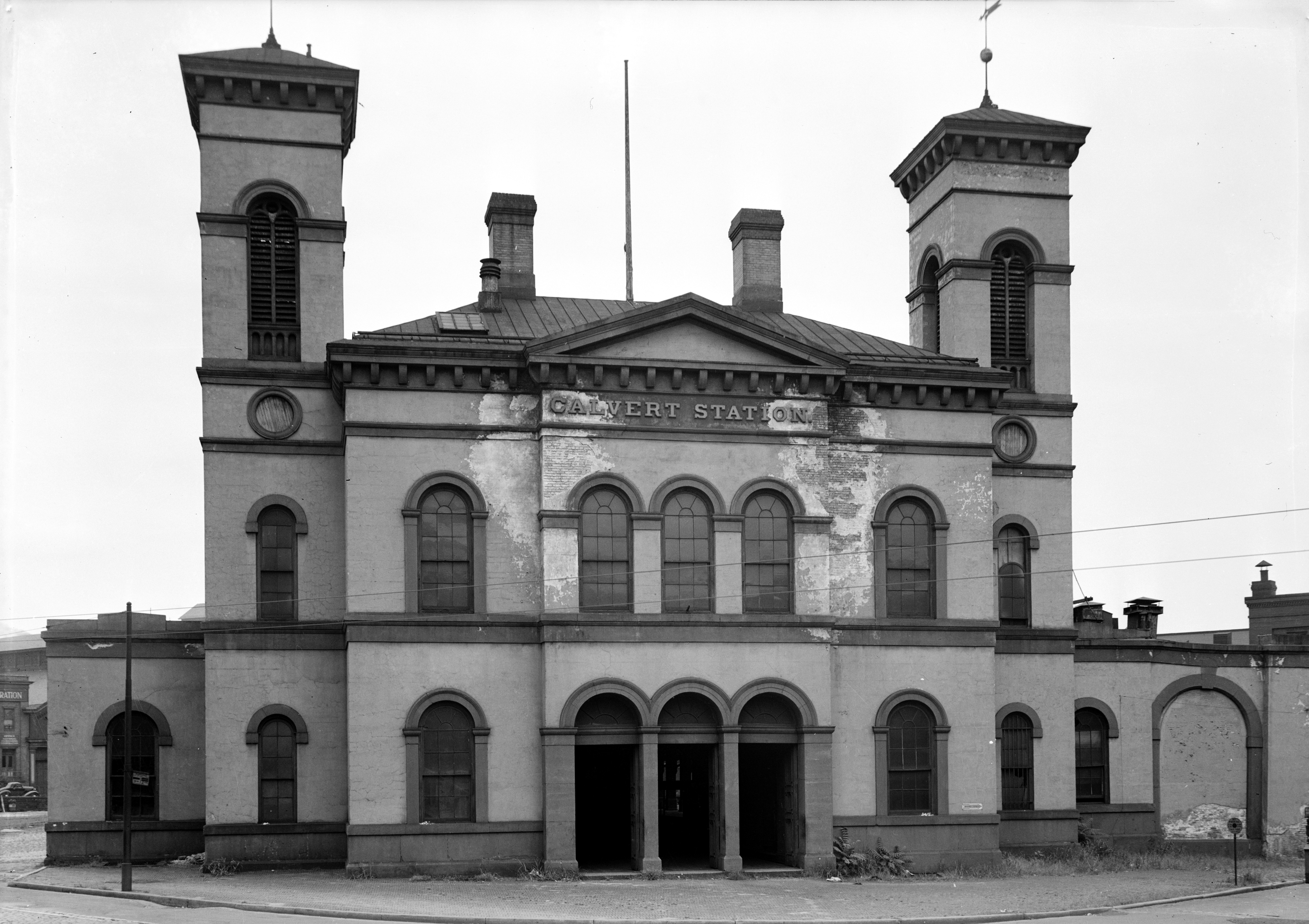
- Exterior view in 1936

General information
- Coordinates: 39°17′43.8″N 76°36′44.4″W
- Owner: Northern Central Railway

History
- Opened: 1850
- Closed: 1948
Location

Calvert Street Station served railroad passengers of the Northern Central Railway in Baltimore, Maryland, from 1850 until 1948. It served as the terminus for the second railway chartered in Maryland, which eventually was expanded into a network containing nearly 400 miles (640 km) of track. The Northern Central, always in financial trouble, was leased by the Pennsylvania Railroad (PRR) after 1861. With the opening of nearby Pennsylvania Station, the terminal became redundant. Rail traffic ceased around 1948 and the station was razed in 1949 to make way for the a new building for The Baltimore Sun.

== History ==
=== 19th century ===
Calvert Street Station was constructed during 1849–1850 to serve as the southern terminus of the Baltimore & Susquehanna, and York & Maryland Railroad, at the intersection of North Calvert and East Franklin Streets in Baltimore, just south of the original terminus at Bolton Station in Bolton Hill, which had opened in 1832.

The Italianate station was designed by James Crawford Neilson (1816–1900), who notably designed several other buildings in and around Baltimore County, Maryland. Although the tracks of the Baltimore and Susquehanna approached from the north, the train shed was built on a curve, allowing the station to front Calvert Street to the west. The station was completed in 1850, by which time the railroad reached as far north as Lemoyne, then called Bridgeport. The railway was reconfigured as the Northern Central in 1854, and completed as far as Sunbury, Pennsylvania in 1858.

On February 23, 1861, Calvert Street Station was designated as an official stop of President-elect Abraham Lincoln's inauguration Whistle-Stop train ride from Springfield, Illinois, to Washington, D.C. The track layout at the time meant that he would have to get off the train at Calvert Street Station and travel by foot or carriage to Camden Station, which was about one mile (1.6 km) away. However, the Baltimore Plot to assassinate him was uncovered, and so special arrangements were made for Lincoln to travel in secret to avoid assassination. Lincoln himself had arrived earlier at 3:30 a.m. that morning into the President Street station thereby frustrating the attempted assassination.

In 1863, President Abraham Lincoln passed through Calvert Station on his way to deliver the Gettysburg Address. Two years later, following Lincoln's assassination, his remains passed through the same station on their way back to Illinois.

In 1873, Charles Street Station, north of the terminal, was opened, serving as a connecting point on the Philadelphia, Wilmington, and Baltimore Railroad.

=== 20th century ===
By the turn of the century, Pennsylvania Station was reconstructed and renamed Union Station. The new terminal served as the nucleus for all Pennsylvania Railroad traffic in and out of Baltimore, and superseded Calvert Street in significance.

Passenger traffic continued to decline between World War I and World War II. Following World War II, the train shed at Calvert Street was removed; the last train left the old terminal in 1948.

The property, then vacant, was sold to The Baltimore Sun and served as the location of the newspaper's new headquarters and printing facility. In 1949, the remaining portion of the station was demolished, removing all traces of the terminal and its approaching rail tracks on Calvert Street.

Preceding station	Pennsylvania Railroad	Following station
Baltimore toward Harrisburg	Northern Central Railway; Baltimore Division	Terminus
Terminus	Philadelphia, Wilmington and Baltimore Railroad	President Street toward Philadelphia
