= York County Heritage Rail Trail =

Rail and trail in Pennsylvania

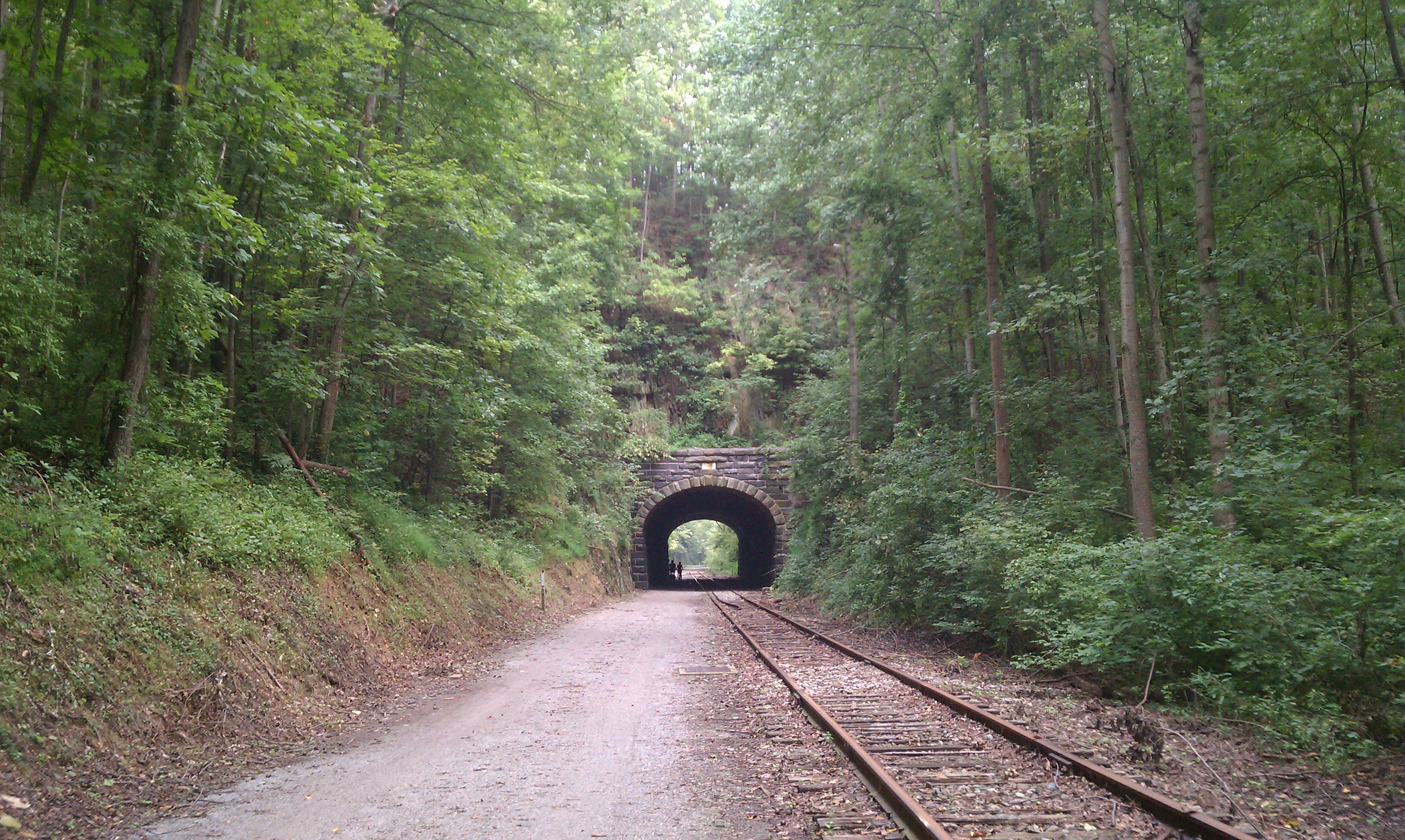
- Howard Tunnel
- Length: 21 mi (34 km)
- Location: York County, PA
- Established: 1999
- Designation: BicyclePA Route J National Recreation Trail
- Trailheads: York, PA; 39.963321°N 76.732797°W; Mason–Dixon line 39.721088°N 76.697953°W
- Use: Hiking, biking, horseback riding, fishing, pet walking
- Elevation change: 482 feet (147 m)
- Highest point: Summit Grove, 852 feet (260 m)
- Lowest point: York Valley, 370 feet (110 m)
- Difficulty: Easy, level, ADA accessible
- Season: Year-round
- Surface: Crushed limestone
- Right of way: Northern Central Railway
- Website: http://www.yorkcountytrails.org/
Trail map

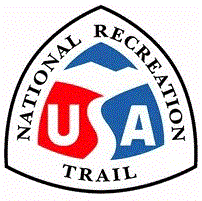
NRT

Heritage Rail Trail County Park is a National Recreation Trail rail-with-trail in Pennsylvania built in 1999 by the York County Rail Trail Authority (YCRTA). It connects with the Torrey C. Brown Rail Trail in Maryland. The trail runs along the active Northern Central Railway line and forms the southernmost part of Route J in the BicyclePA route system.

== Historical development ==
The York County Heritage Rail Trail is located along railroad tracks built during the nineteenth century as part of the Northern Central Railroad (NCR). The NCR was an important link between Washington, D.C., and points along the northern path to Lake Ontario and upstate New York.

During the Civil War, the railroad was a target of the Confederate Army before the Battle of Gettysburg. The Confederate Army's troops tried to isolate the Union's capital by damaging the railroad, telegraph wires and bridges. On November 18 and 19, 1863, President Lincoln traveled on the railroad and stopped at Hanover Junction before giving the Gettysburg Address.

Between the years of 1838 and 1972, the NCR connected Baltimore, Maryland to York, Pennsylvania and vastly contributed to the municipalities along the railroad. The line eventually came under Pennsylvania Railroad (PRR) ownership. In 1968 the PRR and rival New York Central Railroad merged to form the Penn Central Transportation Company (PC). By 1970 PC was bankrupt. The line sustained significant damage resulting from Hurricane Agnes in 1972. PC joined the government-created Conrail in 1976 and the line was abandoned shortly thereafter. The state of Maryland abandoned the line within state borders; Pennsylvania removed one track and left the second in place. In 1990 York County officials looked to develop the 18.5 mile-corridor alongside the dormant trackage.

Expansion of the Heritage Rail Trail north along the Codorus Creek, called the Northern Extension, began in 2005 at John C. Rudy County Park and headquarters of the York County Department of Parks & Recreation. The Northern Extension is being completed in phases, with 4.3 miles from the County Park to U.S. Route 30 completed in 2015. Construction of the section from US 30 to North George Street in the City of York is expected to be completed by the end of 2018. The City of York is undertaking the remaining distance to connect the Northern Extension to the mainline York County Heritage Rail Trail from North George Street to Philadelphia Street and should be ready sometime in 2019.

== Trail development ==
The section of the line between York and New Freedom was acquired by the Pennsylvania Department of Transportation in June 1973 and by 1978 the trail was in use.

The rails-with-trails was built alongside the York County-owned former PRR line, currently in use by heritage railway Steam into History.

In 1992, two Eagle Scouts from Troop 37, Chad Harvey and Jeremy Sykes, spearheaded the development of the trail's first 1.48 miles as their Eagle project. The project encompassed the section of trail running from the Pennsylvania-Maryland state line to the New Freedom junction. Harvey and Sykes raised donations in the form of monies, material and volunteer labor. Both attained the rank of Eagle on August 25, 1993, and their trail was officially opened to the public during York County Rail/Trail Adventure Day on June 4, 1994.

The New Freedom Railroad Station of 1860 was restored to its 1940 appearance in 2003 and is used by Steam into History. Other historical sites include the 250 foot long Howard Tunnel of 1838, named for a Revolutionary War soldier from Baltimore, and the Mason–Dixon line, the old line of freedom." Memorials include a Korean War memorial in downtown York and a War Rescue Dog World War II Memorial.

== Gallery ==
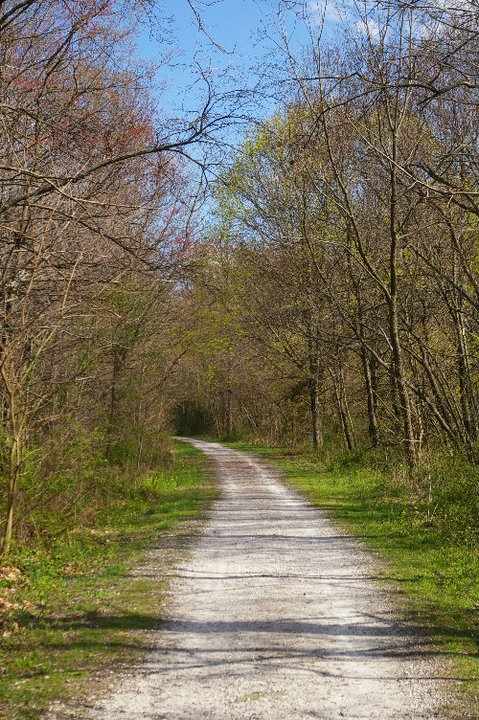
Section of the York County Heritage Rail Trail that runs through New Freedom, Pennsylvania

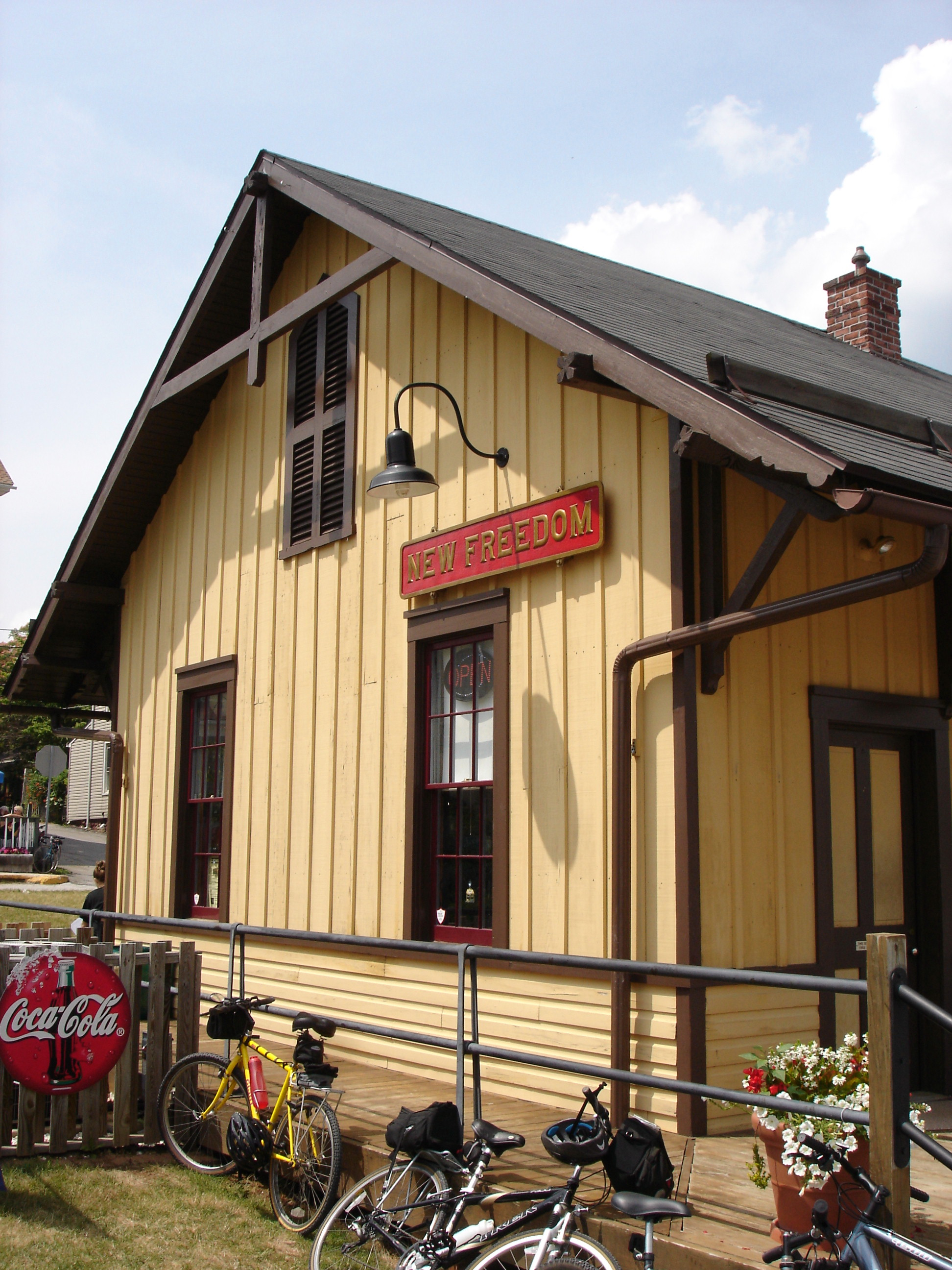
New Freedom Junction: a railroad history museum and the base for heritage railway Steam into History
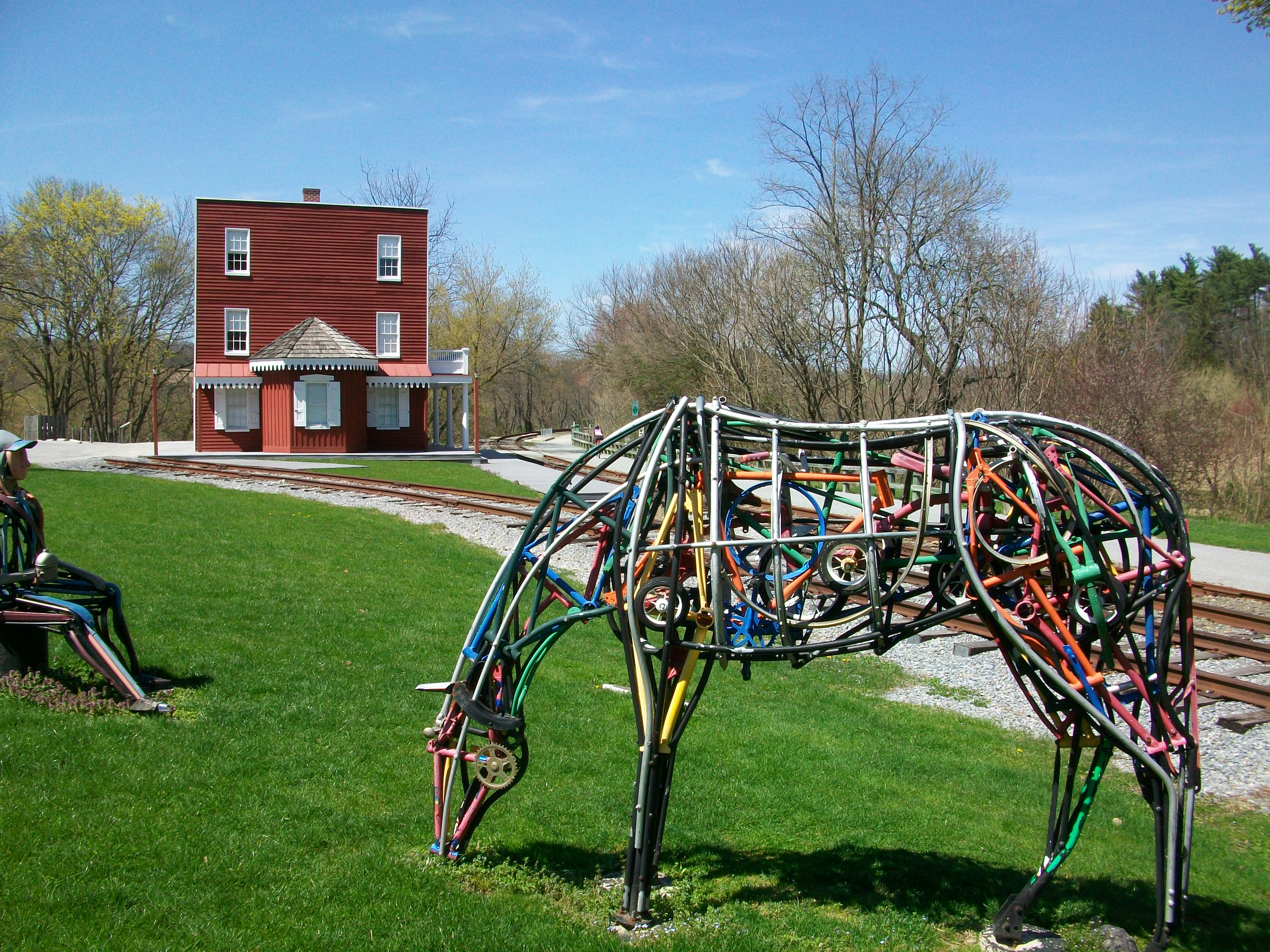
"Livesize Horse"

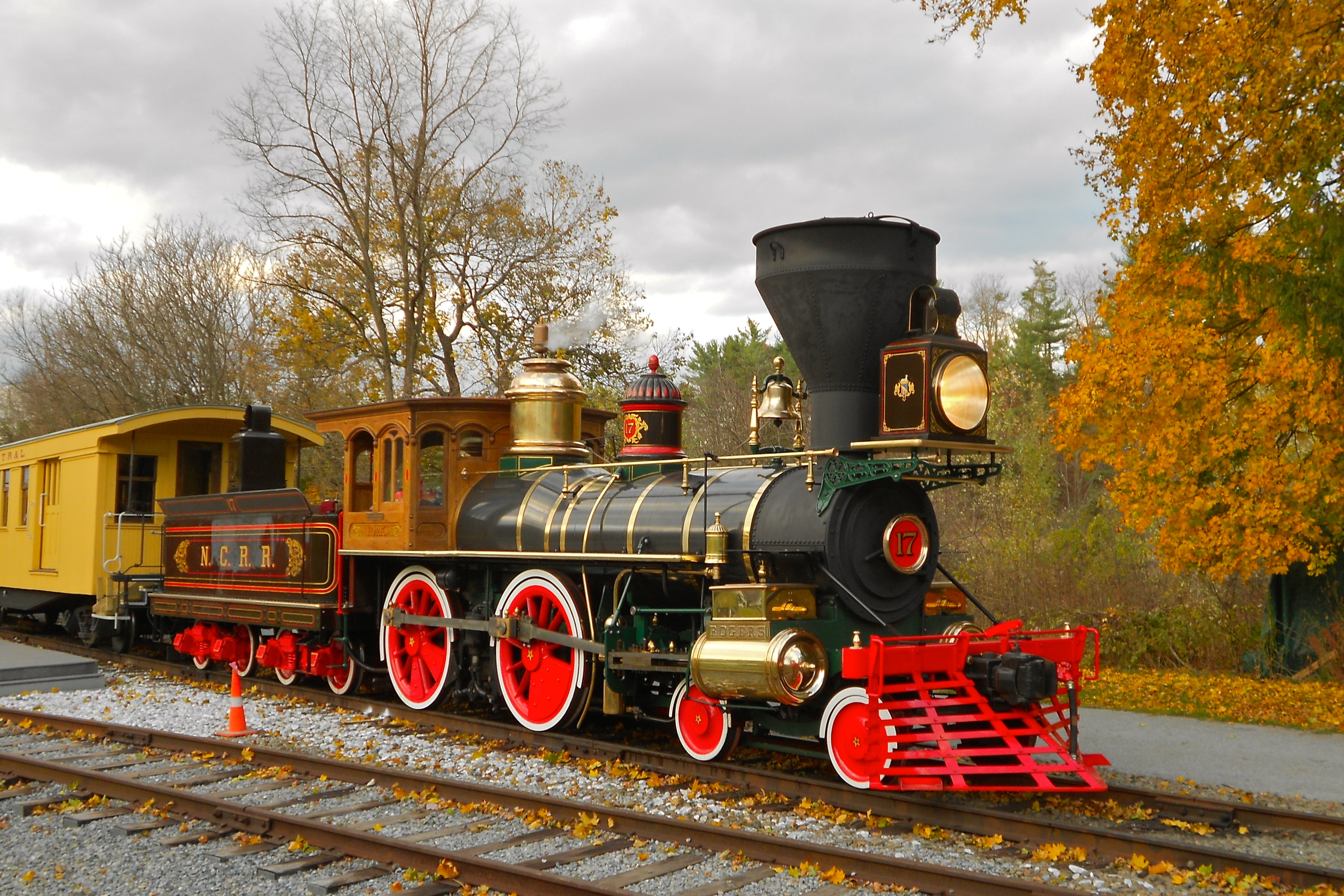
Steam into History's No. 17 York at New Freedom Junction
