= Pennsylvania Route 216 =

State highway in York County, Pennsylvania, US

Pennsylvania Route 216

Route information
- Maintained by PennDOT
- Length: 25.960 mi (41.779 km)

Major junctions
- West end: PA 116 near Hanover
- PA 516 in Sticks; PA 616 in Glen Rock; I-83 near Loganville
- East end: PA 24 in Winterstown

Location
- Country: United States
- State: Pennsylvania
- Counties: York

Highway system
- Pennsylvania State Route System; Interstate; US; State; Scenic; Legislative
← PA 215	→ PA 217

Pennsylvania Route 216 (PA 216) is a 26-mile-long (42 km) state highway located in York County, Pennsylvania. The western terminus is at PA 116 near Hanover. The eastern terminus is at PA 24 in Winterstown. PA 216 is a two-lane undivided road that passes through rural areas in southern York County, serving Sticks and Glen Rock. The route intersects PA 516 in Sticks, PA 616 in Glen Rock, and Interstate 83 (I-83) near Loganville.

PA 216 was designated in 1928 between PA 116 near Hanover and U.S. Route 30 (US 30) west of York, heading east to Glen Rock before it turned north and continued to US 30. In 1930, PA 216 was realigned to head east from Glen Rock to US 111 (Susquehanna Trail) south of Loganville, with PA 616 replacing the portion of the route between Glen Rock and US 30. The route was extended east to an interchange with I-83/US 111 in 1960 and to PA 24 in Winterstown in the 1960s.

== Route description ==
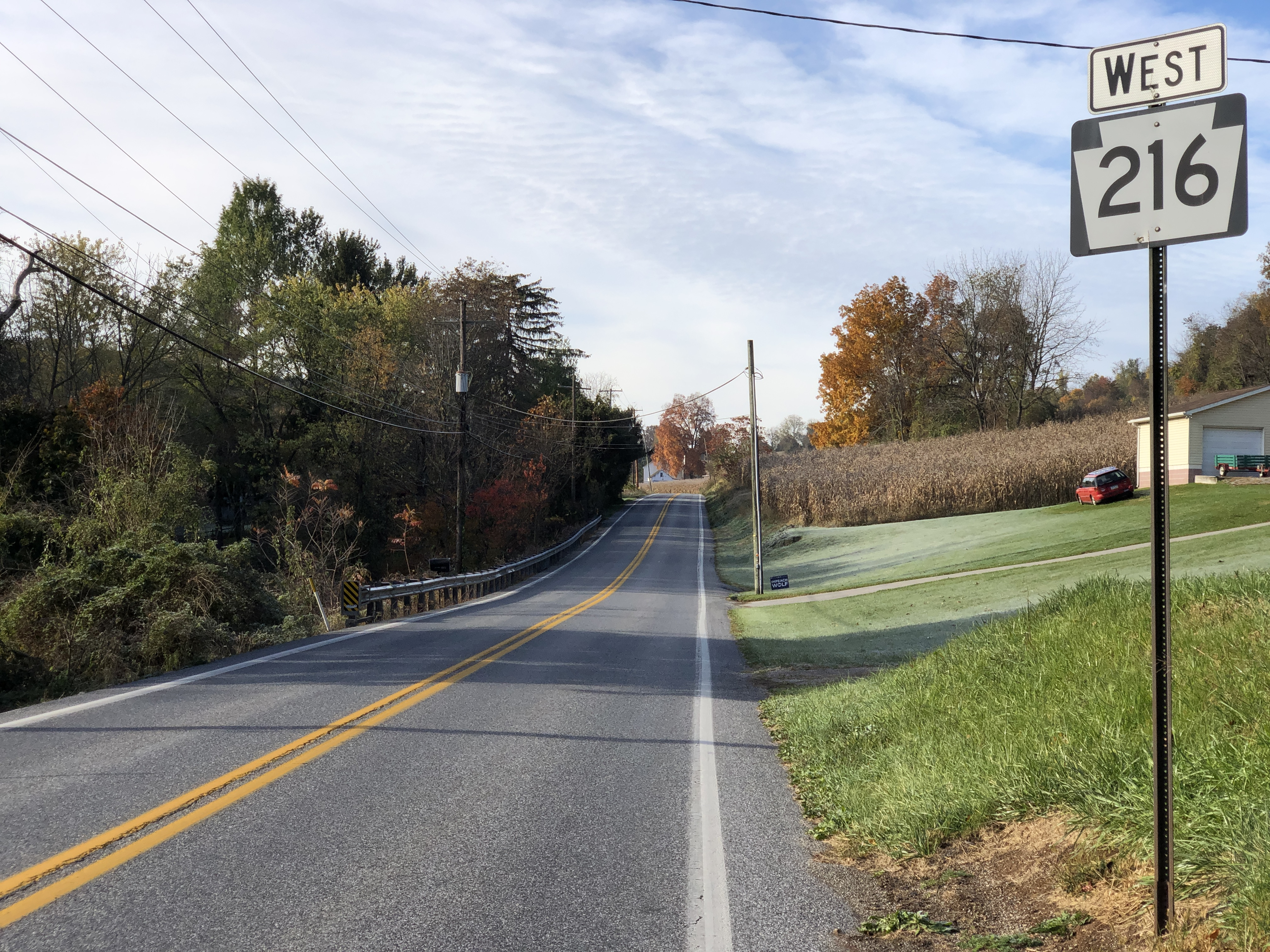
PA 216 westbound in Codorus Township

PA 216 begins at an intersection with PA 116 in Penn Township, heading southeast on two-lane undivided Blooming Grove Road. The road passes residential subdivisions in the community of Blooming Grove, turning east into a mix of homes and woods. The route continues into forested areas of Codorus State Park and turns southeast to cross Lake Marburg into West Manheim Township before entering Manheim Township a short distance later. PA 216 curves east and crosses a couple arms of Lake Marburg before turning south through more forest. The route leaves the state park and passes through more hilly wooded areas with a few small farms and residences, making a sharp curve to the east. The road turns north and ascends a forested hill, making a bend to the southeast. PA 216 crosses the East Branch Codorus Creek into Codorus Township and passes through Brodbecks, where it crosses CSX's Hanover Subdivision railroad line at-grade. The road passes through more forests and runs a short distance to the east of the railroad tracks, reaching the residential community of Glenville. Here, the route heads southeast away from the railroad tracks and runs through woodland with some farms and homes. PA 216 curves east and intersects PA 516, becoming Sticks Road at this point. The road turns northeast into more hilly agricultural surroundings with a few areas of woods and residences, passing through Pierceville. The route passes through more areas of farms, woodland, and homes, crossing the Centerville Creek into Shrewsbury Township. Farther northeast, PA 216 heads into the borough of Glen Rock and becomes Manchester Street, entering residential areas. The road turns north and intersects PA 616.

Here, PA 616 turns northwest to form a concurrency with PA 216 on Main Street, passing businesses in the center of town as it crosses the creek, the York County Heritage Rail Trail, and the Northern Central Railway of York tourist railroad at-grade. The road heads into more wooded areas again as it crosses back into Shrewsbury Township. PA 216 splits from PA 616 by heading northeast on Glen Rock Road into wooded areas of homes, crossing into Springfield Township. The road continues into a mix of farmland and woodland with a few homes, making a curve to the north. The route heads northeast again before it turns southeast onto Susquehanna Trail and passes through more agricultural areas. PA 216 turns northeast onto Seaks Run Road and heads through farmland with some businesses, reaching an interchange with I-83. After this, the road enters a mix of farm fields and woods, turning north before making a sharp turn to the east. The route winds northeast through forested areas with a few farms and homes. After crossing the East Branch Codorus Creek, PA 216 enters North Hopewell Township and turns southeast onto Swamp Road. The route heads through open farmland with a few scattered residences, crossing into the borough of Winterstown. Here, PA 216 reaches its eastern terminus at an intersection with PA 24.

== History ==
When Pennsylvania first legislated routes in 1911, what is now PA 216 was not given a number. PA 216 was designated in 1928 to run from PA 116 east of Hanover east and north to US 30 west of York, following its current alignment east to Glen Rock before it turned north and ran through Seven Valleys before reaching US 30. At this time, the route was paved between PA 116 and west of Glenville, between east of Glenville and Glen Rock, and between Seven Valleys and US 30. In 1930, PA 216 was realigned to head east from Glen Rock to US 111 (Susquehanna Trail) south of Loganville, with PA 616 designated onto the former alignment between Glen Rock and US 30. At this time, the entire length of PA 216 was paved. By 1940, Seaks Run Road was an unpaved road while Swamp Road was a paved road. Seaks Run Road was paved in the 1940s. PA 216 was extended east to an interchange with I-83/US 111 in 1960. The route was extended east from I-83 to PA 24 in Winterstown in 1961 in order to provide a numbered route at the interchange with I-83.

== Major intersections ==
The entire route is in York County.

Location	mi	km	Destinations	Notes
Penn Township	0.000	0.000	PA 116 (York Street)	Western terminus
Codorus Township	10.412	16.756	PA 516 (Lineboro Road) to PA 851 – Spring Grove, York, Lineboro, New Freedom	
Glen Rock	15.831	25.478	PA 616 south (Baltimore Street) – Seitzland, Railroad	South end of PA 616 concurrency
Shrewsbury Township	16.539	26.617	PA 616 north (Glen Rock Road)	North end of PA 616 concurrency
Springfield Township	20.693	33.302	I-83 – York, Baltimore	Exit 8 (I-83)
Winterstown	25.960	41.779	PA 24 (Main Street) – Red Lion, Stewartstown	Eastern terminus
1.000 mi = 1.609 km; 1.000 km = 0.621 mi: Concurrency terminus
