= Pennsylvania Route 616 =

State highway in York County, Pennsylvania, US

Pennsylvania Route 616

Route information
- Maintained by PennDOT
- Length: 14.895 mi (23.971 km)
- Existed: 1930–present

Major junctions
- South end: PA 851 in Railroad
- PA 216 in Glen Rock; PA 214 in Seven Valleys
- North end: US 30 in West Manchester Township

Location
- Country: United States
- State: Pennsylvania
- Counties: York

Highway system
- Pennsylvania State Route System; Interstate; US; State; Scenic; Legislative
| ← PA 615 | → PA 618 |

Pennsylvania Route 616 (PA 616) is a 14.9-mile-long (24.0 km) state highway located in York County in Pennsylvania. The southern terminus is at PA 851 in Railroad. The northern terminus is at U.S. Route 30 (US 30) in West Manchester Township. PA 616 is a two-lane undivided road that passes through rural areas in southwestern York County, serving the communities of Glen Rock, Seven Valleys, and New Salem. The route forms a concurrency with PA 216 in Glen Rock and intersects the western terminus of PA 214 in Seven Valleys.

The section of road between Glen Rock and US 30 was designated as part of PA 216 in 1928. In 1930, PA 216 was realigned and PA 616 was designated onto the former alignment between PA 216 in Glen Rock and US 30. PA 616 was extended south from Glen Rock to the Maryland border south of New Freedom, heading south to Railroad before running along 2nd Street, Main Street, and Front Street. The south end of the route was cut back to PA 516 (now PA 851) in Railroad in the 1950s, with PA 516 (later PA 851) replacing the route between New Freedom and Railroad.

== Route description ==
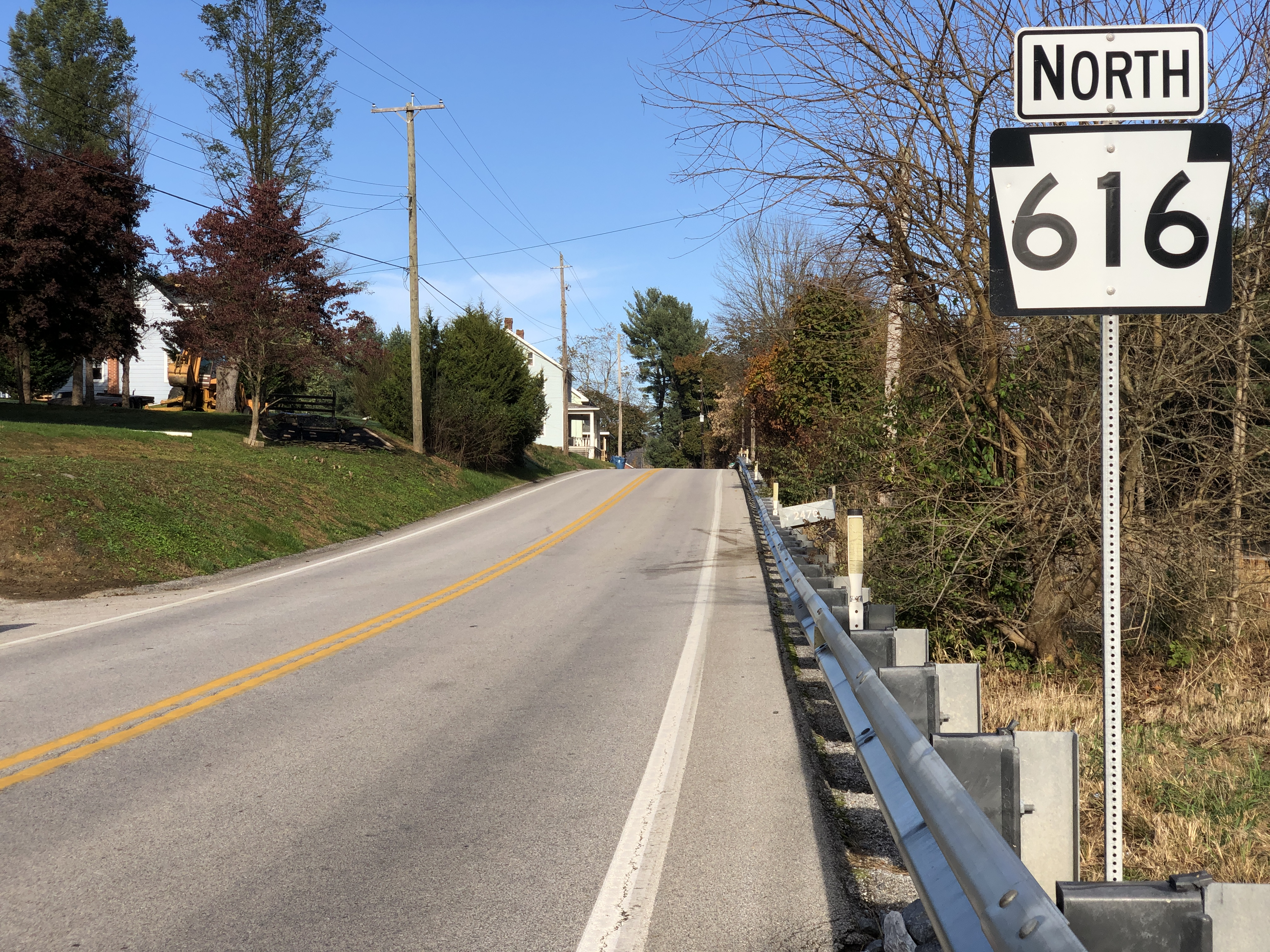
PA 616 northbound in North Codorus Township

PA 616 begins at an intersection with PA 851 in the borough of Railroad, heading northwest on two-lane undivided North Main Street. The road runs through hilly forested areas and passes through a low (8'1") underpass beneath the York County Heritage Rail Trail and the Northern Central Railway of York tourist railroad before entering Shrewsbury Township and becoming Pleasant Valley Road. The route continues to the east of the Old Mill Creek and the rail trail/tourist railroad as it passes through more wooded areas with a few homes. PA 616 passes a few farms before it turns west and crosses the Old Mill Creek and passes under the trail/railroad tracks, making a curve north to run along the west bank of the creek. The road runs through more forests with small areas of homes and fields, continuing into the borough of Glen Rock. At this point, the route becomes Baltimore Street and heads northwest past homes before intersecting PA 216. Here, PA 616 turns northwest to form a concurrency with PA 216 on Main Street, passing businesses in the center of town as it crosses the creek along with the York County Heritage Rail Trail and the Northern Central Railway of York line. The road heads into more wooded areas again as it crosses back into Shrewsbury Township.

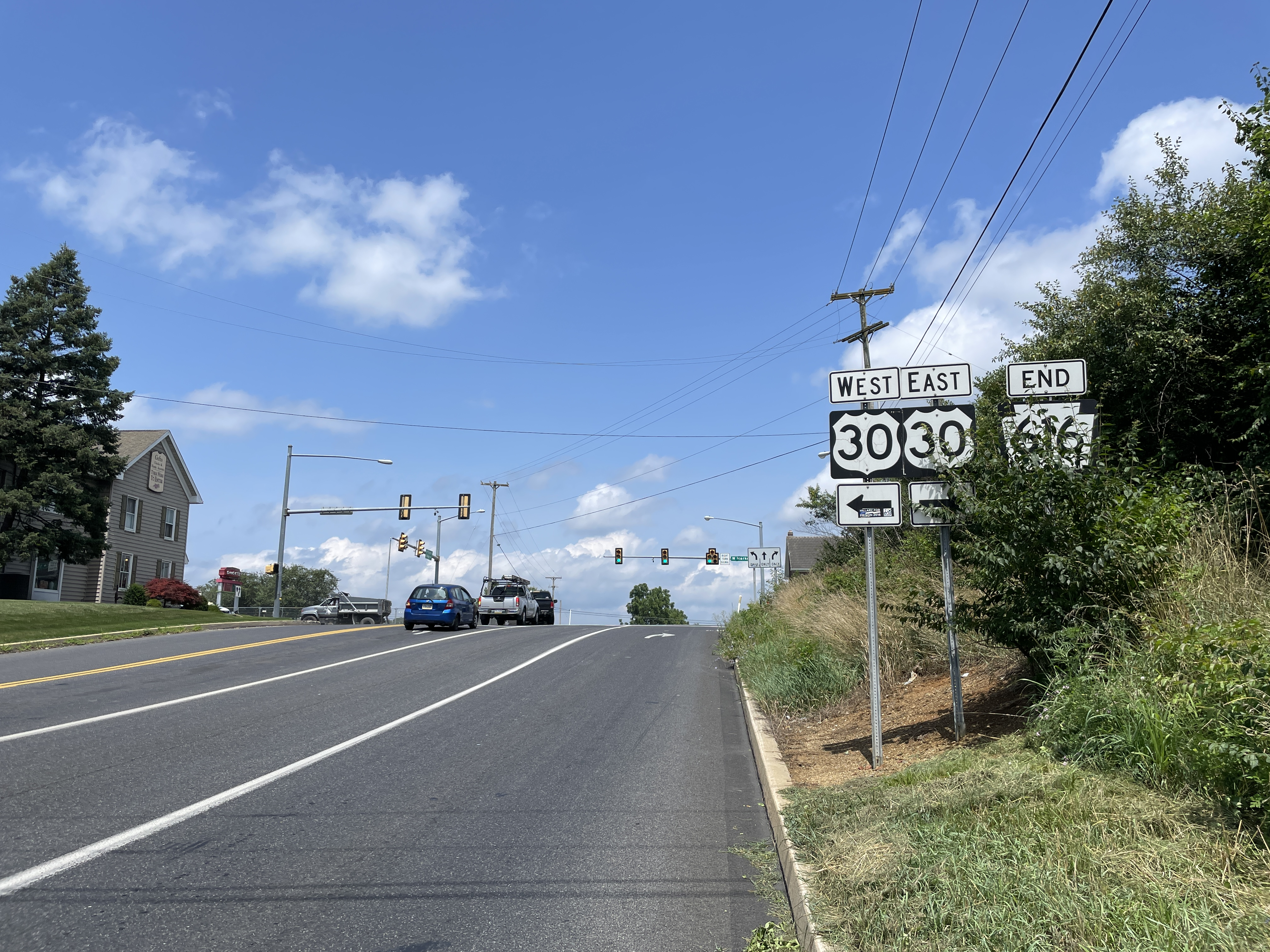
PA 616 northbound approaching terminus at US 30 in West Manchester Township

PA 216 splits from PA 516 by heading northeast on Glen Rock Road, and PA 616 makes a turn west onto Seven Valleys Road, crossing the South Branch Codorus Creek and the trail/railroad line before turning northwest into Codorus Township. The route runs through more hilly forests immediately to the west of the rail trail/tourist railroad and the creek. Farther to the northwest, PA 616 winds through a mix of farmland and woodland with a few homes, eventually reaching the community of Seltzville. From here, the road continues northwest through wooded areas of residences and reaches Hanover Junction, crossing into North Codorus Township. The route curves north past more farms and woods, intersecting the western terminus of PA 214 near the borough of Seven Valleys. Here, PA 616 turns northwest to continue on Seven Valleys Road, heading away from the creek and rail trail. The road passes through more hilly forests before entering a mix of farmland, woodland, and residences. The route heads into the borough of New Salem, where it becomes Main Street and passes homes and businesses. Upon leaving New Salem, PA 616 becomes Trinity Road and runs through woodland before heading into farmland and crossing the Codorus Creek into West Manchester Township. In this area, the route crosses a York Railway line and continues through more agricultural surroundings with a few homes. PA 616 reaches its northern terminus at an intersection with US 30.

== History ==
When routes were first legislated in Pennsylvania in 1911, what is now PA 616 was not given a number. In 1928, the road between Glen Rock and US 30 west of York was designated as part of PA 216, which turned west from Glen Rock. At this time, the road was paved between Seven Valleys and US 30 while the portion between Glen Rock and Seven Valleys was unpaved. PA 216 was realigned to head east from Glen Rock in 1930 and PA 616 was designated to run from PA 216 in Glen Rock north to US 30 west of York along the former portion of PA 216. By this time, the road between Railroad and Glen Rock was unnumbered, with the section between Seitzland and Glen Rock paved. In 1937, PA 616 was extended south from Glen Rock to the Maryland border south of New Freedom, following its current alignment to Railroad before running along 2nd Street, Main Street, and Front Street. The entire length of PA 616 was paved in the 1930s. In the 1950s, the southern terminus of PA 616 was cut back to PA 516 (now PA 851) in Railroad, with PA 516 (later PA 851) replacing the route between New Freedom and Railroad and the remainder between the Maryland border and New Freedom becoming unnumbered.

== Major intersections ==
The entire route is in York County.

| Location | mi | km | Destinations | Notes |
|---|---|---|---|---|
| Railroad | 0.000 | 0.000 | PA 851 (South Main Street / East Main Street) – Shrewsbury, New Freedom | Southern terminus |
| Glen Rock | 3.247 | 5.226 | PA 216 west (Manchester Street) | Southern end of PA 216 concurrency |
| Shrewsbury Township | 3.954 | 6.363 | PA 216 east (Glen Rock Road) | Northern end of PA 216 concurrency |
| Seven Valleys | 9.129 | 14.692 | PA 214 east (Main Street) – Loganville | Western terminus of PA 214 |
| West Manchester Township | 14.895 | 23.971 | US 30 (West Market Street) – Gettysburg, York, Lancaster | Northern terminus |
1.000 mi = 1.609 km; 1.000 km = 0.621 mi: Concurrency terminus
