= Pennsylvania Route 214 =

State highway in York County, Pennsylvania, US

Pennsylvania Route 214

Route information
- Maintained by PennDOT
- Length: 11.289 mi (18.168 km)
- Existed: 1961–present

Major junctions
- West end: PA 616 in Seven Valleys
- East end: PA 74 in Dallastown

Location
- Country: United States
- State: Pennsylvania
- Counties: York

Highway system
- Pennsylvania State Route System; Interstate; US; State; Scenic; Legislative
← PA 213	→ PA 215

Pennsylvania Route 214 (PA 214) is an 11.3-mile-long (18.2 km) state highway located in York County, Pennsylvania. The western terminus is at PA 616 in Seven Valleys. The eastern terminus is at PA 74 in Dallastown. PA 214 is a two-lane undivided road that runs through rural areas to the south of York. Along the way, the route passes through Loganville, where it has indirect access to Interstate 83 (I-83). PA 214 was designated between PA 616 in Seven Valleys and PA 74 in Dallastown in 1961. In 2009, the route was shifted to bypass West Ore Street through the western portion of Loganville to the north in order to provide more direct access to I-83.

== Route description ==
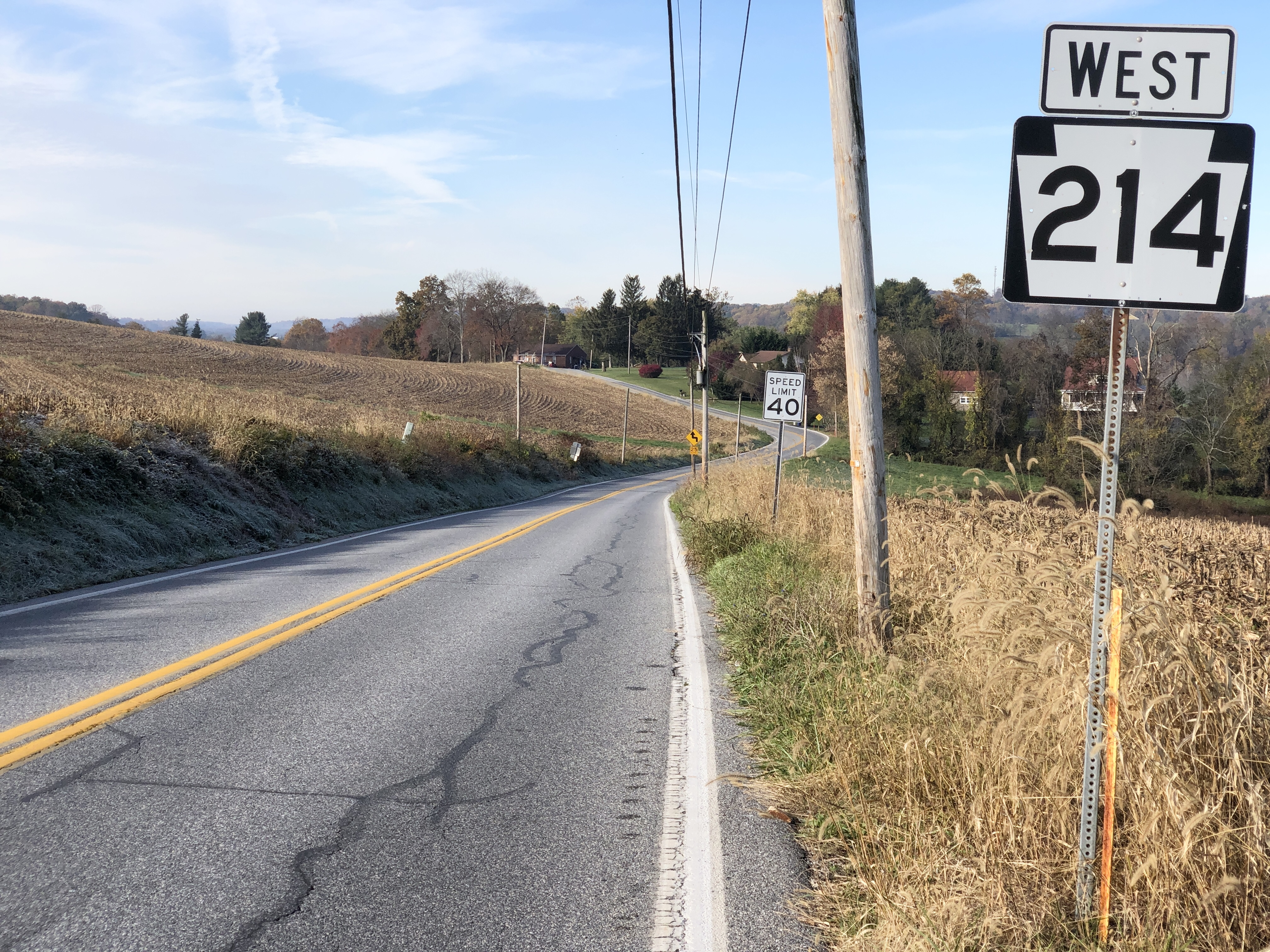
PA 214 westbound in Springfield Township

PA 214 begins at an intersection with PA 616 in North Codorus Township, heading southeast on two-lane undivided Main Street into the borough of Seven Valleys. The route crosses the South Branch Codorus Creek and passes businesses, crossing under the York County Heritage Rail Trail before turning northeast onto Church Street. The road passes several homes before turning north and then northeast again to run immediately to the southeast of the rail trail, entering agricultural areas. PA 214 leaves Seven Valleys for Springfield Township and becomes Valley Road, heading farther to the east from the rail trail as it passes through a mix of farmland and woodland. The route makes a curve to the east and passes rural areas of residences before passing more farms and turning south onto Reynolds Mill Road. The road heads through agricultural areas with some woods and homes before making a sharp turn to the east.

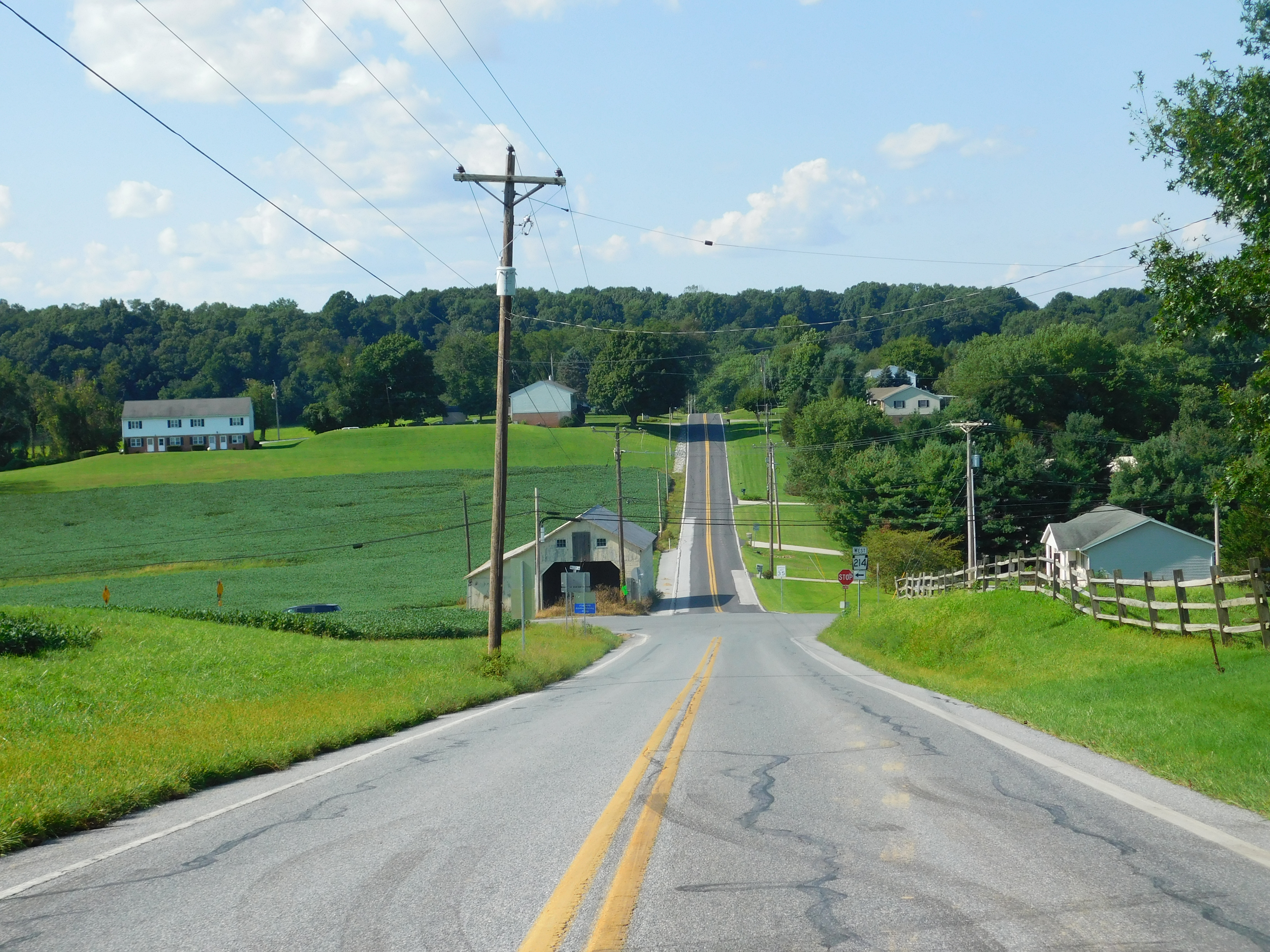
PA 214 in Springfield Township

At this point, PA 214 enters a mix of farmland and residential subdivisions, with the route splitting from Reynolds Mill Road by becoming the Loganville Connector before entering the borough of Loganville. The connector is a two-lane bypass of West Ore Street which has one bridge crossing over Water Street. The bypass ends at a traffic light with the Susquehanna Trail (old U.S. Route 111) and North Street. North Street continues east to an interchange with I-83 at exit 10. PA 214 turns south onto the Susquehanna Trail which becomes Main Street as it enters downtown Loganville. The road here passes through a small commercial district and residences before turning left onto East Ore Street. The road crosses back into Springfield Township and becomes Dunkard Valley Road as it runs past more farms, crossing under I-83. Here, the route turns northeast into agricultural areas with patches of homes and woodland, crossing the East Branch Codorus Creek into York Township. PA 214 continues north on Hess Farm Road, turning east onto South Pleasant Avenue. The road turns north through more rural areas with increasing residential development. PA 214 continues into the borough of Dallastown and passes homes as it reaches its eastern terminus at PA 74.

== History ==
When Pennsylvania legislated routes in 1911, what is now PA 214 was not given a number. By 1930, the road between Rye and Dallastown as an unnumbered paved road. The road between Loganville and Rye was paved by the 1930s. The section of the current route along Church Street and Valley Road heading east from Seven Valleys was paved by 1941. Reynolds Mill Road and West Ore Street in Loganville was paved by 1957. PA 214 was designated in 1961 in order to provide a numbered route at the interchange with I-83 and has followed mostly the same roads as it did when it was first signed. The route previously followed West Ore Street through Loganville before intersecting the Susquehanna Trail and continuing east on its present route.

In 2008, construction started on the Loganville Connector which rerouted PA 214 off of West Ore Street onto a new road from west of Loganville to an intersection with North Street and the Susquehanna Trail. The new 2-mile (3.2 km) bypass, which allows for easier access to I-83's exit 10, was completed in October 2009 at a cost of $6.7 million. The Pennsylvania Department of Transportation (PennDOT) transferred the former section of PA 214 along West Ore Street to local maintenance.

== Major intersections ==
The entire route is in York County.

Location	mi	km	Destinations	Notes
Seven Valleys	0.000	0.000	PA 616 (Main Street) – New Salem, Glen Rock	Western terminus
Springfield Township	5.518	8.880	North Street to I-83 – York, Baltimore	To exit 10 (I-83)
Dallastown	11.289	18.168	PA 74 (Main Street)	Eastern terminus
1.000 mi = 1.609 km; 1.000 km = 0.621 mi
