= Pennsylvania Route 516 =

State highway in York County, Pennsylvania, US

Pennsylvania Route 516

Route information
- Maintained by PennDOT
- Length: 12.461 mi (20.054 km)

Major junctions
- South end: MD 86 at the Maryland state line in Manheim Township
- PA 851 in Codorus Township; PA 216 in Codorus Township
- North end: PA 116 in Spring Grove

Location
- Country: United States
- State: Pennsylvania
- Counties: York

Highway system
- Pennsylvania State Route System; Interstate; US; State; Scenic; Legislative
← PA 515	→ PA 518

Pennsylvania Route 516 (PA 516) is a 12.5-mile-long (20.1 km) state highway located in York County, Pennsylvania. The southern terminus is the Maryland state line in Manheim Township, where the road continues into that state as Maryland Route 86 (MD 86). The northern terminus is at PA 116 in Spring Grove. PA 516 is a two-lane undivided road that passes through rural areas in southwestern York County. The route heads northeast from the state line to Sticks, where it turns north and intersects the western terminus of PA 851 and crosses PA 216. PA 516 heads northwest and passes through Jefferson before it reaches its northern terminus.

PA 516 was designated in 1930 between PA 216 in Sticks and PA 116 south of Spring Grove. The route was extended east from Sticks to PA 616 in New Freedom in 1937. PA 516 was further extended to Interstate 83 (I-83)/U.S. Route 111 (US 111) and the western terminus of PA 851 east of Shrewsbury in the 1950s, replacing the portion of PA 616 between New Freedom and Railroad. The road between the Maryland border and Sticks was built in the 1950s and PA 516 was realigned to use it in 1961, with the former alignment between Sticks and I-83 becoming a western extension of PA 851.

== Route description ==
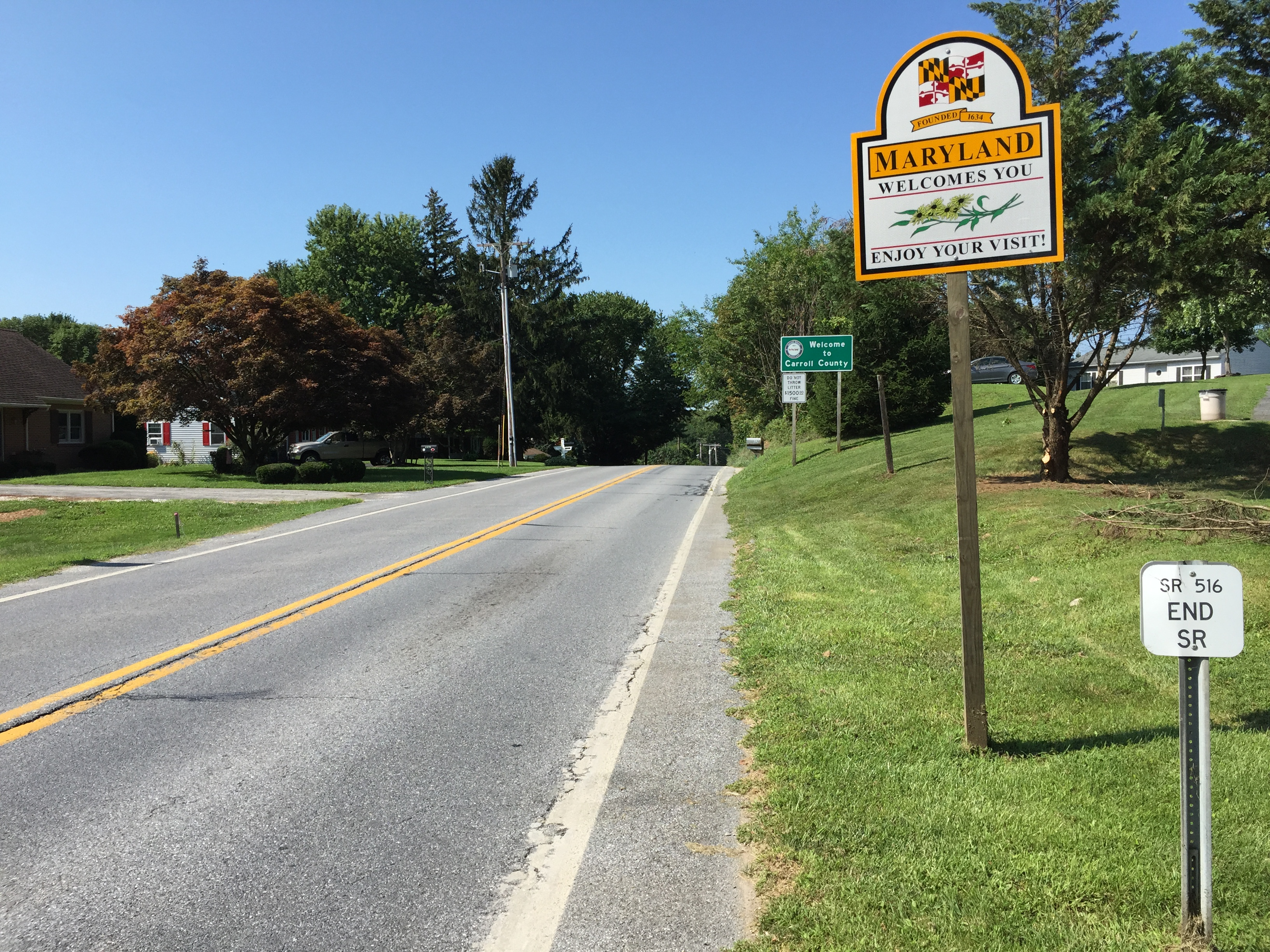
Southern terminus of PA 516 at the Maryland border in Manheim Township

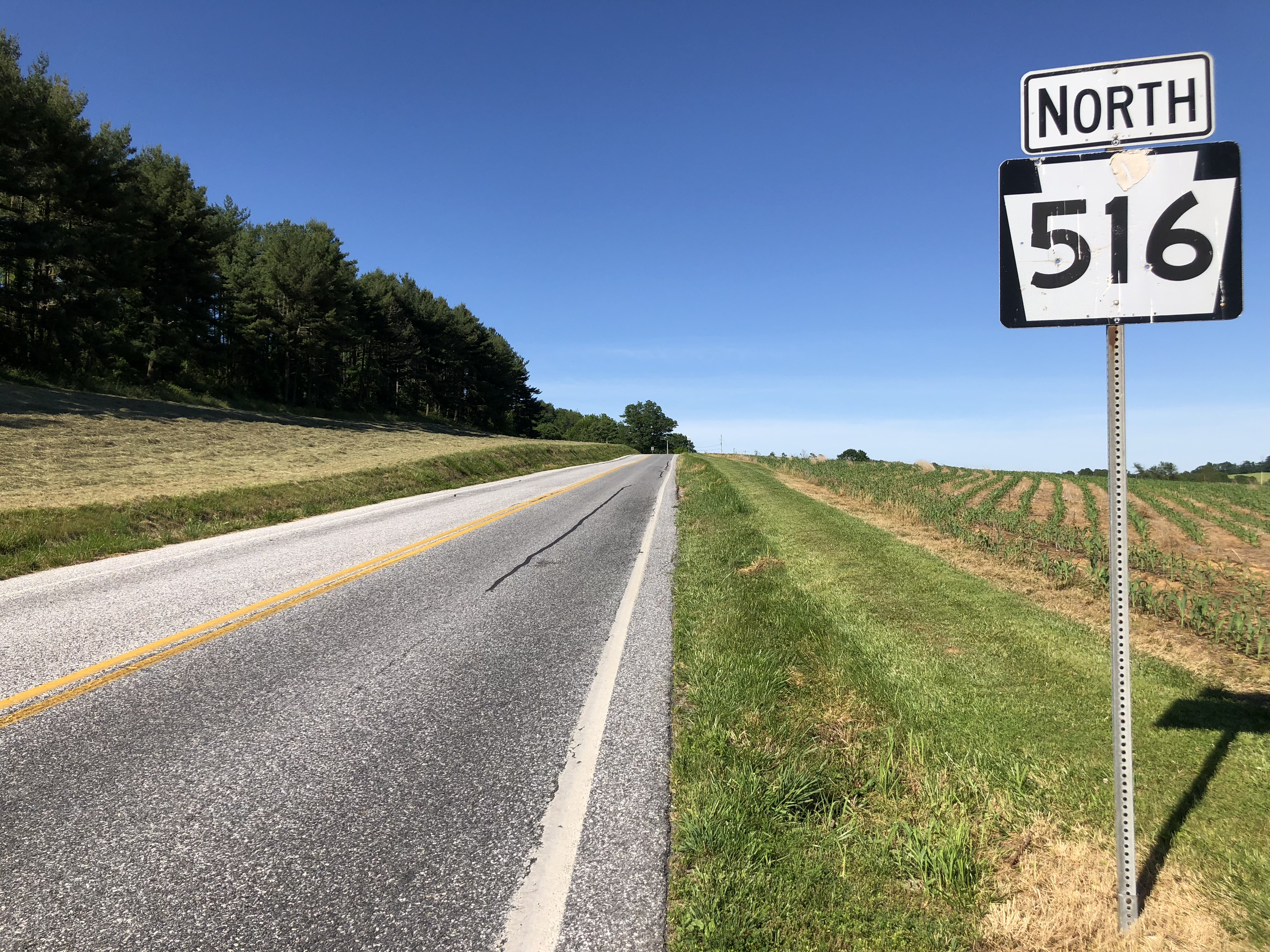
PA 516 northbound in Manheim Township

PA 516 begins at the Maryland border in Manheim Township, heading to the northeast on two-lane undivided Lineboro Road. The road continues into Maryland as MD 86. From the state line, the route runs through open agricultural areas in a narrow valley with a few homes. PA 516 crosses into Codorus Township and reaches the community of Sticks, intersecting the western terminus of PA 851. Here, the route turns north onto Steltz Road and crosses PA 216 a short distance later, becoming Jefferson Road at this point. The road continues north through wooded areas with some homes before heading back into agricultural surroundings with occasional patches of woods and residences. The route turns more to the northwest and continues into the borough of Jefferson, where it becomes Baltimore Street and passes homes. Upon reaching a roundabout with Hanover Street/York Street in the center of town, PA 516 becomes Berlin Street. Upon leaving Jefferson, the route enters North Codorus Township and becomes Jefferson Road again and passes through a mix of farmland and residences. Farther to the north, PA 516 reaches its northern terminus at an intersection with PA 116 to the south of the borough of Spring Grove.

== History ==
When Pennsylvania legislated routes in 1911, what is now PA 516 was not given a number. PA 516 was designated in 1930 to run from PA 216 in Sticks north to PA 116 south of Spring Grove along a paved road. In 1937, the route was extended east from PA 216 to PA 616 (2nd Street) in New Freedom. In the 1950s, an unnumbered road was built connecting PA 516 in Sticks with MD 86 at the Maryland border. In addition, PA 516 was extended east to an interchange with I-83/US 111 east of Shrewsbury, where the road continued east as PA 851; the extended route replaced PA 616 between New Freedom and Railroad. PA 516 was realigned to run from Sticks to MD 86 at the state line in 1961, with an extended PA 851 replacing the former alignment between Sticks and I-83.

== Major intersections ==
The entire route is in York County.

Location	mi	km	Destinations	Notes
Manheim Township	0.000	0.000	MD 86 south (Main Street) – Lineboro	Maryland state line; southern terminus
Codorus Township	2.760	4.442	PA 851 east (Middletown Road) – New Freedom	Western terminus of PA 851
Codorus Township	2.872	4.622	PA 216 (Glenville Road / Sticks Road) – Hanover, Glen Rock	
North Codorus Township	12.461	20.054	PA 116 (York Road) – Spring Grove, Hanover	Northern terminus
1.000 mi = 1.609 km; 1.000 km = 0.621 mi
