= Codorus =

Codorus may refer to:

- Codorus Creek, in York County, Pennsylvania
- Codorus State Park, in York County, Pennsylvania
- Codorus Township, York County, Pennsylvania
- North Codorus Township, York County, Pennsylvania
