= South Road (disambiguation) =

South Road, or the Main South Road, is a major north–south arterial road in South Australia.

South Road may also refer to:

- South Road Bridge, Northern Central Railway, a historic stone arch bridge in Pennsylvania, United States
- South Road Extension, or the Dingley Arterial Road Project, a partially-completed arterial road in Melbourne, Australia
- South Road Properties, a 300 hectare island-type reclamation area in Cebu City, Philippines
- South Road Superway, an elevated motorway in Adelaide, Australia
- South Road Trail, or the Applegate Trail, an emigrant trail through California and Nevada, United States
