= Bridge 5+92, Northern Central Railway =

Historic railroad bridge

- U.S. National Register of Historic Places
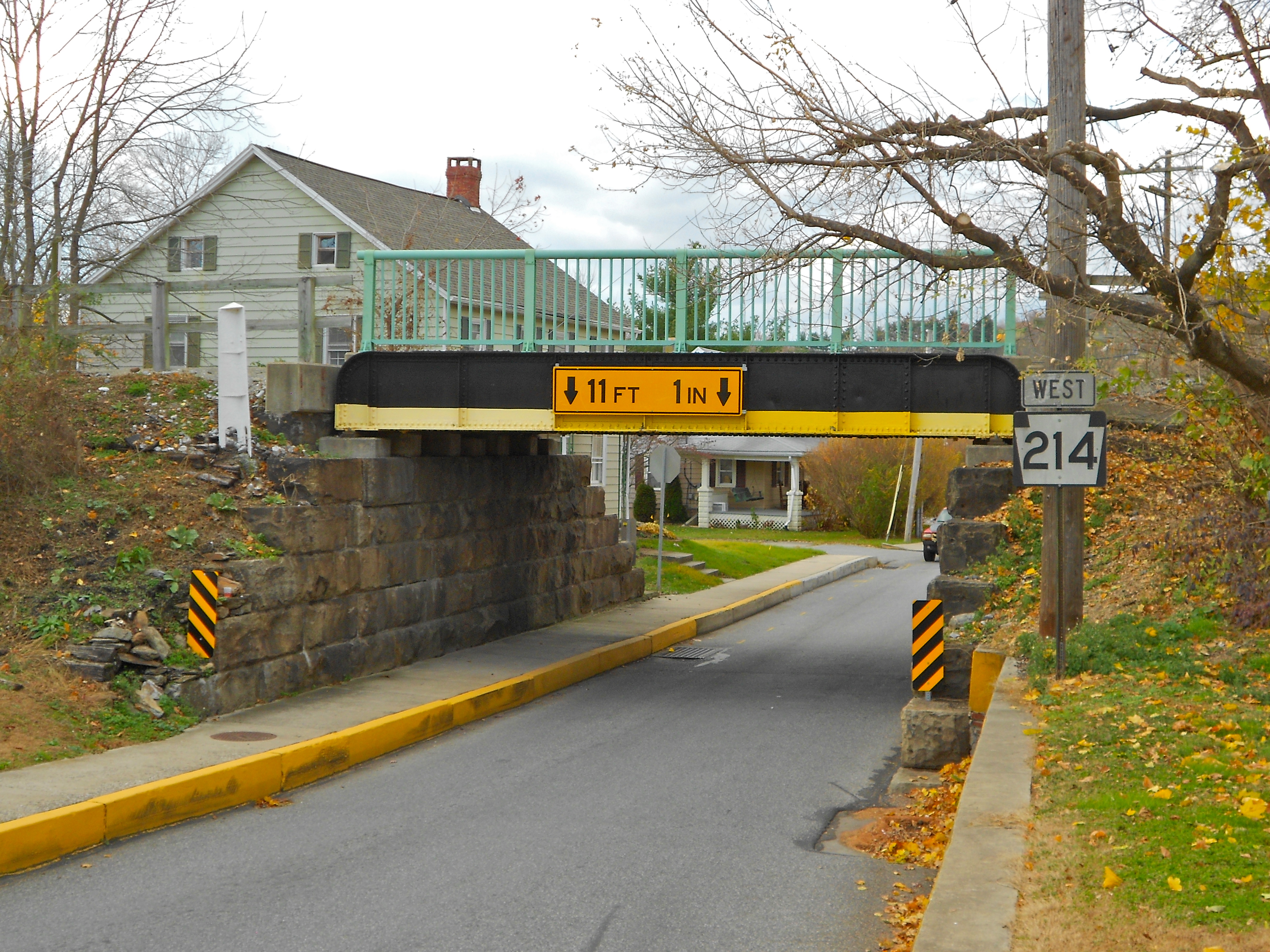
- Looking south

- Location within Pennsylvania Location within the United States
- Location: Northern Central RR tracks over S. Main St., N of Rt. 214, Seven Valleys, Pennsylvania
- Coordinates: 39°51′15″N 76°46′18″W
- Area: less than one acre
- Built: 1900
- Architectural style: Girder
- MPS: Railroad Resources of York County MPS
- NRHP reference No.: 95000548
- Added to NRHP: May 4, 1995

Bridge 5+92, Northern Central Railway is a historic railroad bridge in Seven Valleys, York County, Pennsylvania. It was built in 1900, and measures about 30-foot-long (9.1 m) overall. The girder bridge on granite abutments was built by the Northern Central Railway and crosses a roadway.

It was added to the National Register of Historic Places in 1995.

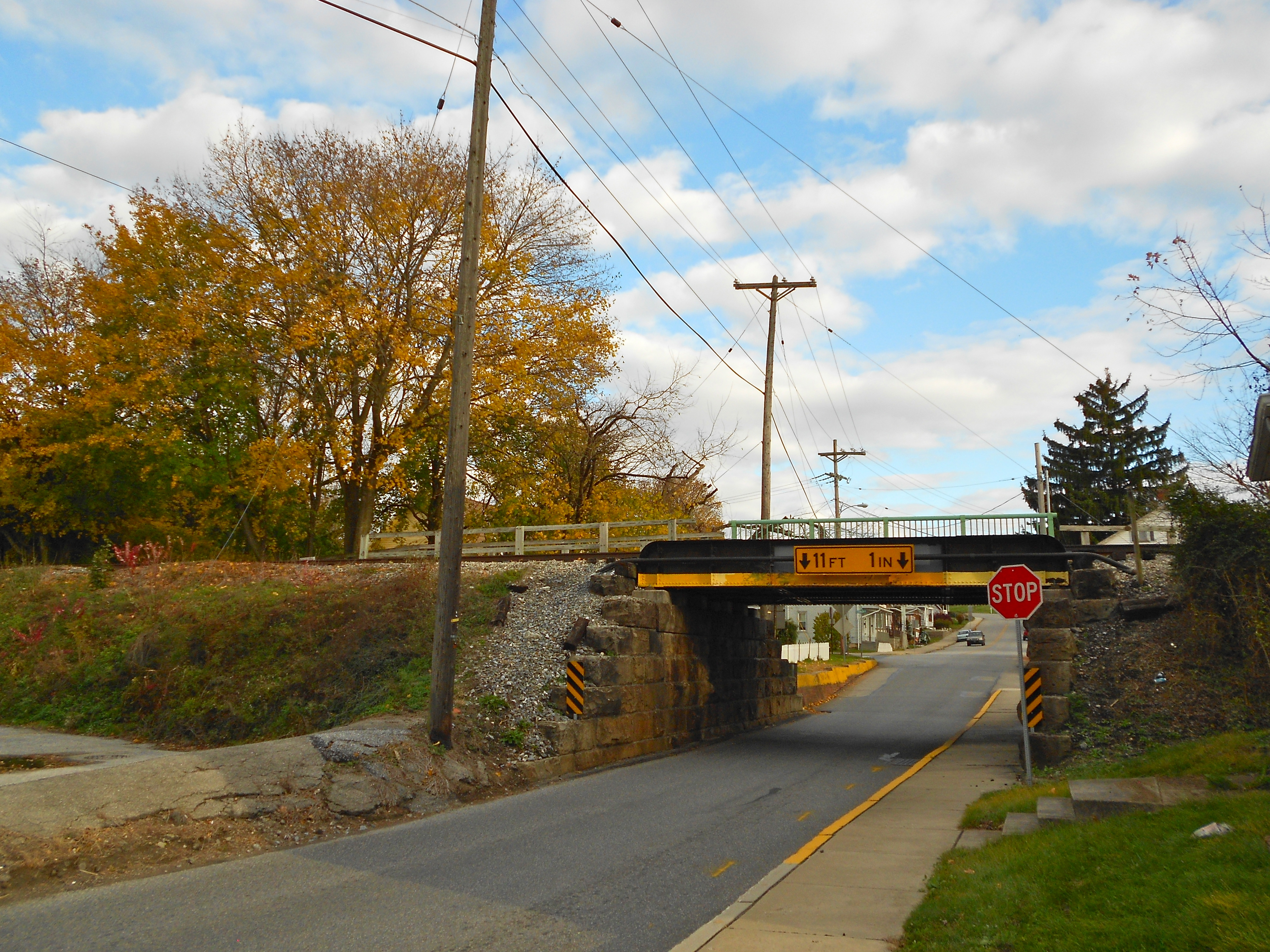
Looking north
