= Codorus State Park =

State park in York County, Pennsylvania

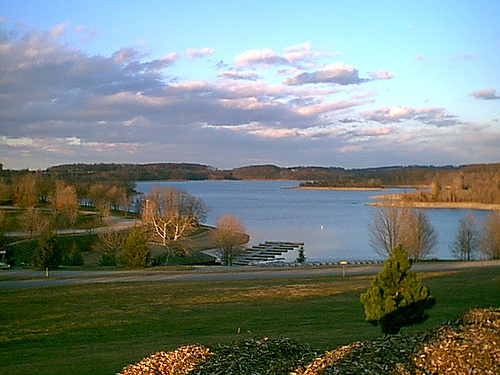
- Lake Marburg

- Location within Pennsylvania Location within the United States
- Interactive map of Codorus State Park
- Location: York County, Pennsylvania, United States
- Coordinates: 39°47′26″N 76°55′08″W
- Area: 3,500 acres (1,400 ha)
- Established: May 30, 1967 (opened, as Codorus Creek State Park}
- Administrator: Pennsylvania Department of Conservation and Natural Resources
- Website: Official website
- Pennsylvania State Parks

Codorus State Park is a 3,500-acre (1,400 ha) Pennsylvania state park in Heidelberg, Manheim, Penn, and West Manheim Townships in southwestern York County, Pennsylvania in the United States. The park was created around Lake Marburg, an artificial lake covering 1,275 acres (516 ha), and is named for Codorus Creek, which forms the lake. Codorus State Park is located on Pennsylvania Route 216, 3 miles (4.8 km) from the borough of Hanover.

== History ==
=== Early history ===
When Europeans first reached the land that became Codorus State Park, it was the territory of Susquehannock Indians, a powerful tribe that controlled much of the land near the Susquehanna River. Wars and the push of settlers, most of which were German farmers, led to the demise of the Susquehannocks, but industry soon followed.

Built in 1762, Mary Ann Furnace is believed to be the first charcoal furnace built on the western side of the Susquehanna River. The furnace supplied cannonballs and grapeshot for the continental army and employed Hessian prisoners to run the ironworks while many of the available workforce were off fighting the British. Nothing remains of the ironworks except memories.

The four original founders of Mary Ann Furnace had a great impact on the United States. George Stevenson emigrated from Ireland and was employed as a deputy surveyor by the Penn Family. Stevenson organized wagons and supplies for the Forbes Campaign during the French and Indian War. When the British occupied Philadelphia and York became the capital of the Colonies, George Washington called on Stevenson to take charge of the supply lines.

George Ross was a lawyer from Lancaster. During the American Revolutionary War, he served in the Provincial Assembly, the Provincial Conference and the Continental Congress. He signed the Declaration of Independence. He also introduced George Washington to the widow of his nephew, the flagmaker Betsy Ross.

William Thompson emigrated from Ireland. In the French and Indian War, he served as an officer under John Armstrong in the Kittanning Expedition and as a captain of the light horse in the Forbes Campaign. In the American Revolution, he became the colonel of the first colonial infantry and advanced to brigadier general. He was captured in the Second Assault on Quebec and held prisoner for four years, only to die not long after his release.

Mark Bird was the son of ironmaster William Bird, of Hopewell Furnace. In the American Revolution, Bird served as deputy quartermaster and as a colonel. He used his own money and ironworks to supply cannons and munitions. After the war, he was never repaid. Deep in debt, he went bankrupt and fled to North Carolina to avoid his creditors.

=== Modern history ===
The creation of Codorus State Park is tied to a cooperative effort between private enterprise and state and local government. The borough of Spring Grove and the P.H. Glatfelter Company worked together to dam Codorus Creek. The purpose of the dam was to provide drinking water for Spring Grove and to meet the industrial needs of the paper plant owned by the P.H. Glatfelter Company in the borough. The construction of this dam was also beneficial to the people of Pennsylvania when a park was created on the shores of the newly made Lake Marburg.

Lake Marburg gets its name from the small community of Marburg, home of a handful of buildings - including a farmstead - that was flooded in December 1966, when Codorus Creek was dammed. The dam is 109 feet (33 m) high, 1,690 feet (520 m) wide and 750 feet (230 m) thick. It is not owned by the Commonwealth of Pennsylvania, but is instead owned by and on the property of the P.H. Glatfelter Company.

The land for the park was acquired as part of the Project 70 Land Acquisition and Borrowing Act, with the governor approving the acquisition on December 10, 1964. The park officially opened in 1970. It was originally named "Codorus Creek State Park".

== Lake Marburg ==
Lake Marburg
- Codorus Lake
- Location within Pennsylvania
- Location: within Codorus State Park; Spring Grove, Pennsylvania
- Coordinates: 39°48′N 76°54′W
- Type: Artificial lake
- Etymology: to former town of Marburg, PA, which lies beneath the lake
- Primary inflows: Codorus Creek
- Managing agency: P.H. Glatfelter Paper Company (dam); Pennsylvania Fish and Boat Commission (lake management)
- Designation: IUCN category V (protected landscape/seascape)
- Built: 1966
- First flooded: 1970
- Surface area: 1,275 acres (516 ha)
- Max. depth: 110 ft (34 m)
- Shore length^{1}: 26 mi (42 km)
- Surface elevation: 622 ft (190 m)
- Islands: 2 - Long Island, Round Island
- Settlements: Hanover, Pennsylvania
- ^{1} Shore length is not a well-defined measure.

To fill its massive water demands, P.H. Glatfelter Company, now known as Glatfelter Paper, built Lake Lehman in 1942. Later, to fill additional needs, the company built Lake PahaGaCo (P.H. Glatfelter Co.) in 1955. It supplemented PaHaGaCo’s 1.3 billion gallons (1,300,000,000 US gallons (4.9×10^{9} L; 1.1×10^{9} imp gal)) with water from the Thomasville Stone & Lime Company quarries. But a severe drought of 1963 proved that more water was needed.

The drought also convinced Pennsylvania officials that more reservoirs were needed and that dovetailed with separate state plans to build a new state park on the west branch of the three-pronged Codorus Creek.

Lake Marburg has 26 miles (42 km) of coastline. The lake holds many different species of fish. Fishermen will find largemouth bass, yellow perch, crappie, muskellunge, catfish, northern pike, and bluegill in the warm waters of Lake Marburg. Cold water fishing is available in the east branch of Codorus Creek where anglers will find rainbow trout and brown trout that have been stocked for sport fishing by the Pennsylvania Fish and Boat Commission. Canoes, kayaks, sailboats and motor boats up to 20 hp are all permitted on Lake Marburg, provided they are registered properly with the state.

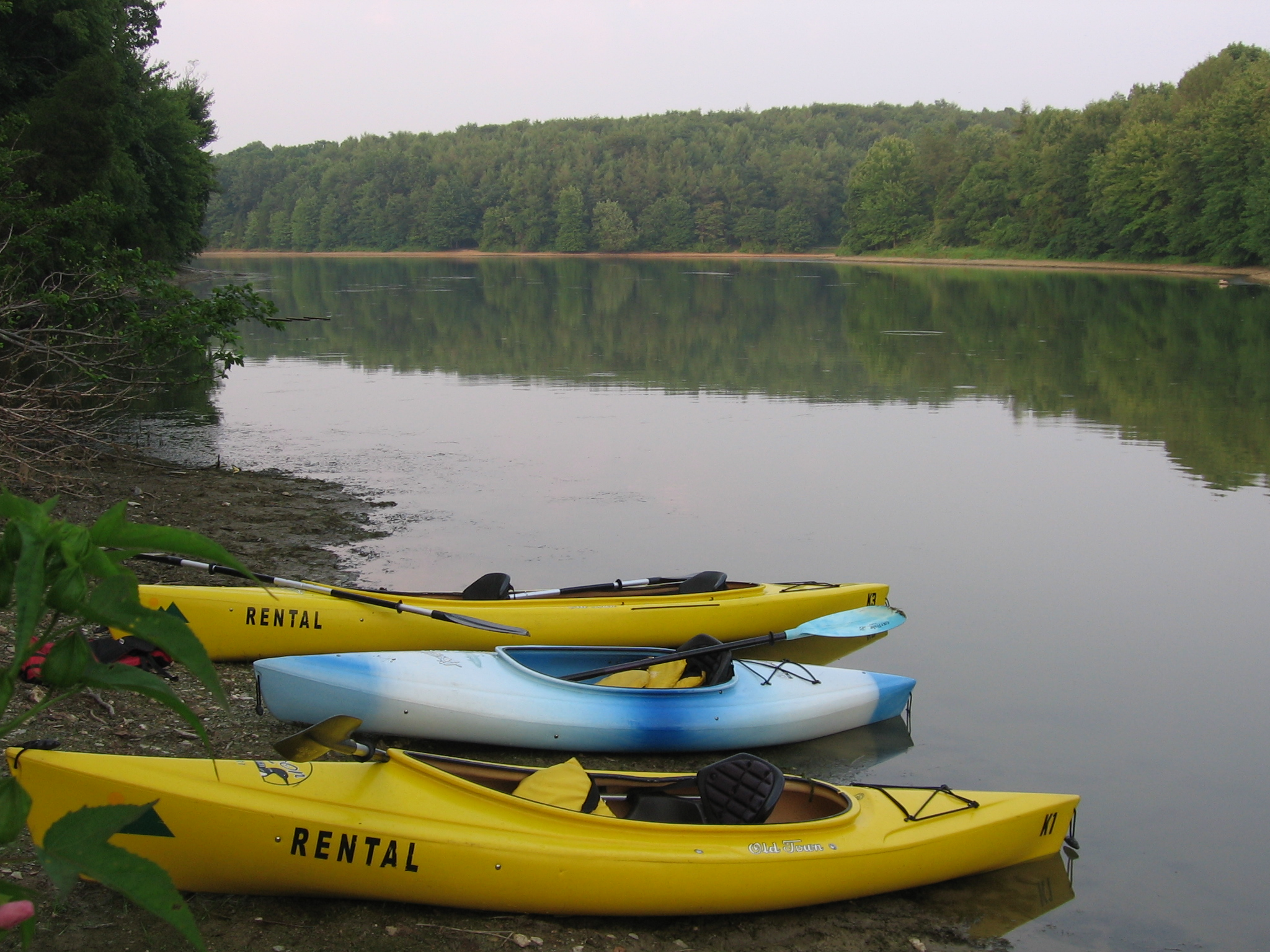
Kayaking at Codorus State Park

== Recreation ==
The park is open for fishing, boating, and camping. It also has a swimming pool and a 54-hole disc golf course.

Codorus State Park has modern and rustic camp site available. There are 198 camp sites that are suitable for RV's (up to 50 feet (15 m) in length) and tents. There are eight campsites with electricity or accommodate campers with disabilities. Codorus State Park also has 13 walk-in campsites for those interested in camping in tents only.

Picnic tables are scattered throughout the park, and two pavilions may be reserved for use by large groups.

There are 5 miles (8.0 km) of hiking trails with Codorus State Park. The Mary Ann Furnace trail is 3.5 miles (5.6 km) long. It is a loop trail that winds through pine plantations, hardwood forests and some wetlands. The LaHo trail is 1.5 miles (2.4 km) long and follows the lakeshore of Lake Marburg through hardwoods and wetlands. Hiking is also possible on the 7 miles (11 km) horse trail on the west side of the park.

There are several mountain biking trails on the northwestern side of the lake, open year round.

There are two 18-hole disc golf courses, and two 9-hole extra courses at Codorus State Park. There is also a 9-hole minis course. The blue course is a more technical 18 holes mostly through wooded areas. The red course is more open, but has some longer holes. There is a bonus course with 9 holes and a cross country course with 9 holes.

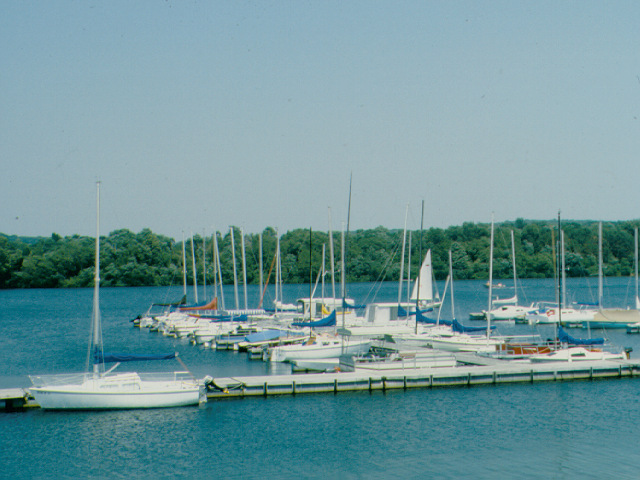
The marina at Codorus State Park

Hunting is permitted in Codorus State Park. The most common game species are ruffed grouse, eastern gray squirrel, wild turkey and white-tailed deer. Hunters are expected to follow the rules and regulations of the Pennsylvania State Game Commission. Hunters are limited to using shotguns, muzzleloaders and bows.

Codorus State Park does not close in winter. Snowmobiling, cross country skiing, sledding, ice skating, ice fishing and ice sailing are all popular winter activities, when the weather permits.
