= Maryland Route 86 =

State highway in Carroll County, Maryland, US, known as Lineboro Rd

Maryland Route 86
- Lineboro Road
- Maryland Route 86 highlighted in red

Route information
- Maintained by MDSHA
- Length: 4.00 mi (6.44 km)
- Existed: 1927–present

Major junctions
- South end: MD 30 in Manchester
- North end: PA 516 in Lineboro

Location
- Country: United States
- State: Maryland
- Counties: Carroll

Highway system
- Maryland highway system; Interstate; US; State; Scenic Byways
← MD 85	→ MD 88

Maryland Route 86 (MD 86) is a state highway in the U.S. state of Maryland. Known as Lineboro Road, the state highway runs 4.00 miles (6.44 km) from MD 30 in Manchester north to the Pennsylvania state line in Lineboro, where the highway continues as Pennsylvania Route 516 (PA 516). MD 86 was constructed in the late 1920s; the MD 30 junction was reconfigured due to residential development around 2008.

== Route description ==
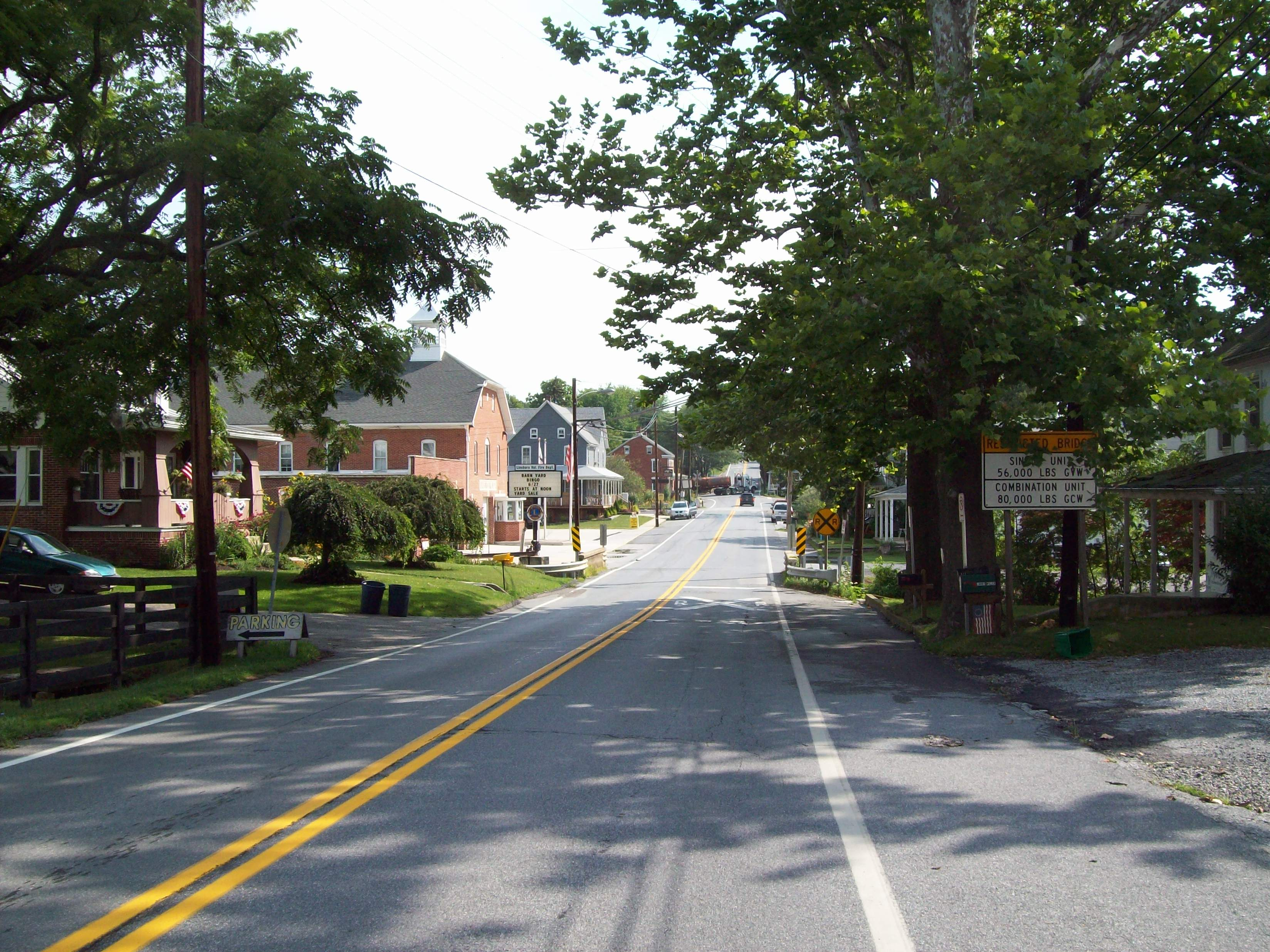
MD 86 northbound in Lineboro

MD 86 begins at an intersection with MD 30 (Hanover Pike) on the north side of the town of Manchester. A left turn is prohibited from southbound MD 30 to northbound MD 86; southbound MD 30 traffic has to use municipally-maintained Hallie Avenue to access MD 86. MD 86 heads northeast as a two-lane undivided road through farmland just south of the parallel Dug Hill Ridge and north of a tributary of the South Branch of Gunpowder Falls. The tributary passes under the state highway and enters the South Branch just south of MD 86's intersection with Water Tank Road, where MD 86 crosses the South Branch. The state highway continues northeast as the main street of the village of Lineboro. MD 86 crosses over the North Branch of Gunpowder Falls and heads across CSX's Hanover Subdivision railroad line at-grade while passing through the Lineboro Historic District. The state highway reaches its northern terminus at the Pennsylvania state line, where Lineboro Road continues northeast as PA 516 toward the borough of Glen Rock.

== History ==
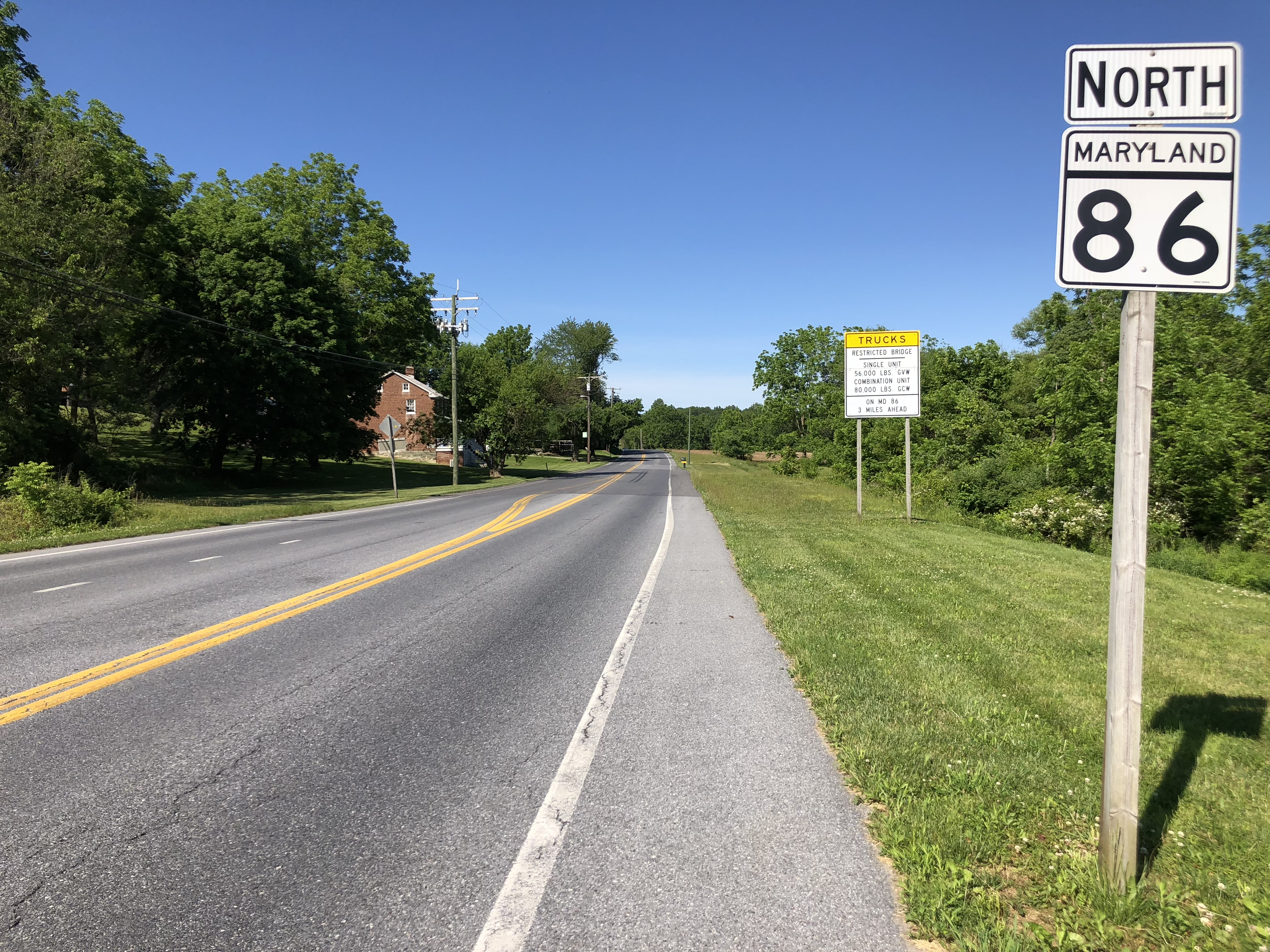
View north at the south end of MD 86 at MD 30 in Manchester

The first 1-mile (1.6 km) concrete section of MD 86 was constructed from Manchester in 1925. A second section was completed in 1928. MD 86 was completed as a concrete road through Lineboro to the Pennsylvania state line in 1929 and 1930. Around 2008, in conjunction with the construction of residential subdivisions, the MD 30–MD 86 intersection was modified to prohibit left turns from MD 30 to MD 86 to improve traffic flow on MD 30. The possibility of turning the intersection into a right-in/right-out intersection allowing access to and from MD 86 only from northbound MD 30 was considered but postponed for further study. The right-in/right-out configuration may be implemented in the future, which would require both directions of traffic between MD 86 and southbound MD 30 to use Hallie Avenue as a connector.

== Junction list ==
The entire route is in Carroll County.

Location	mi	km	Destinations	Notes
Manchester	0.00	0.00	MD 30 (Hanover Pike) – Hanover	Southern terminus; no direct access from southbound MD 30 to northbound MD 86
Lineboro	4.00	6.44	PA 516 north (Lineboro Road) – Glen Rock	Pennsylvania state line; northern terminus
1.000 mi = 1.609 km; 1.000 km = 0.621 mi: Incomplete access

== See also ==
- List of roads in Carroll County, Maryland
