= Springfield Township, York County, Pennsylvania =

Township in Pennsylvania, US

Coordinates: 39°51′00″N 76°45′29″W

- Township
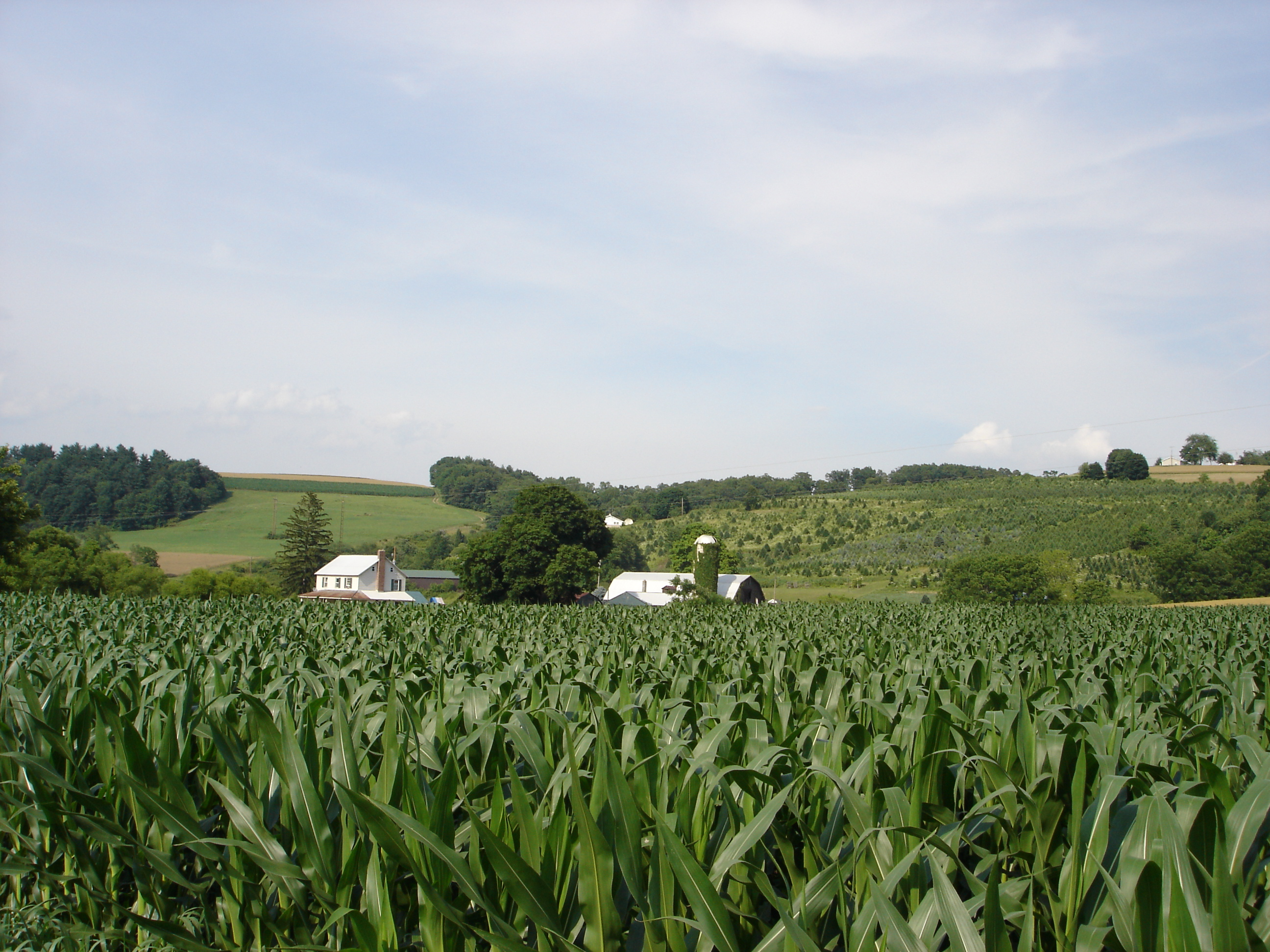
- Cornfield near Codorus Creek

- Location in York County and the state of Pennsylvania.
- Country: United States
- State: Pennsylvania
- County: York
- Settled: 1763
- Incorporated: 1835

Government
  - Type: Board of Supervisors

Area
  - Total: 26.67 sq mi (69.07 km^{2})
  - Land: 26.37 sq mi (68.30 km^{2})
  - Water: 0.30 sq mi (0.77 km^{2})

Population (2020)
  - Total: 6,028 ▲
  - Estimate (2023): 6,078
  - Density: 210/sq mi (82/km^{2})
- Time zone: UTC-5 (Eastern (EST))
  - Summer (DST): UTC-4 (EDT)
- Zip code: 17313, 17327, 17349, 17360, 17403, 17407
- Area code: 717/223
- FIPS code: 42-133-73096
- Website: www.springfieldyork.org

Historical population
Census	Pop.	Note	%±
1930	1,351		—
1940	1,414		4.7%
1950	1,467		3.7%
1960	1,751		19.4%
1970	2,221		26.8%
1980	3,506		57.9%
1990	3,918		11.8%
2000	3,889		−0.7%
2010	5,152		32.5%
2020	6,028		17.0%
2023 (est.)	6,078		0.8%
U.S. Decennial Census

Springfield Township is a township in York County, Pennsylvania, United States. The population was 6,028 at the 2020 census.

== History ==
The South Road Bridge, Northern Central Railway was added to the National Register of Historic Places in 1995.

== Geography ==
According to the United States Census Bureau, the township has a total area of 26.5 square miles (69 km^{2}), of which 26.2 square miles (68 km^{2}) is land and 0.3 square miles (0.78 km^{2}), or 1.17%, is water. The township completely surrounds the boroughs of Loganville and Jacobus, and the borough of Seven Valleys is located along the northwestern edge of the township.

== Demographics ==
At the 2000 census there were 3,889 people, 1,444 households, and 1,143 families living in the township. The population density was 148.4 inhabitants per square mile (57.3/km^{2}). There were 1,506 housing units at an average density of 57.5 per square mile (22.2/km^{2}). The racial makeup of the township was 98.79% White, 0.39% African American, 0.05% Native American, 0.36% Asian, and 0.41% from two or more races. Hispanic or Latino of any race were 0.54%.

Of the 1,444 households 34.7% had children under the age of 18 living with them, 71.3% were married couples living together, 5.5% had a female householder with no husband present, and 20.8% were non-families. 15.7% of households were one person and 6.7% were one person aged 65 or older. The average household size was 2.69 and the average family size was 3.02.

The age distribution was 24.7% under the age of 18, 7.0% from 18 to 24, 27.7% from 25 to 44, 29.3% from 45 to 64, and 11.3% 65 or older. The median age was 40 years. For every 100 females there were 102.3 males. For every 100 females age 18 and over, there were 98.7 males.

The median household income was $59,250 and the median family income was $63,281. Males had a median income of $41,513 versus $27,197 for females. The per capita income for the township was $27,410. About 3.3% of families and 4.4% of the population were below the poverty line, including 5.9% of those under age 18 and 3.8% of those age 65 or over.
