= South Road Bridge, Northern Central Railway =

- U.S. National Register of Historic Places
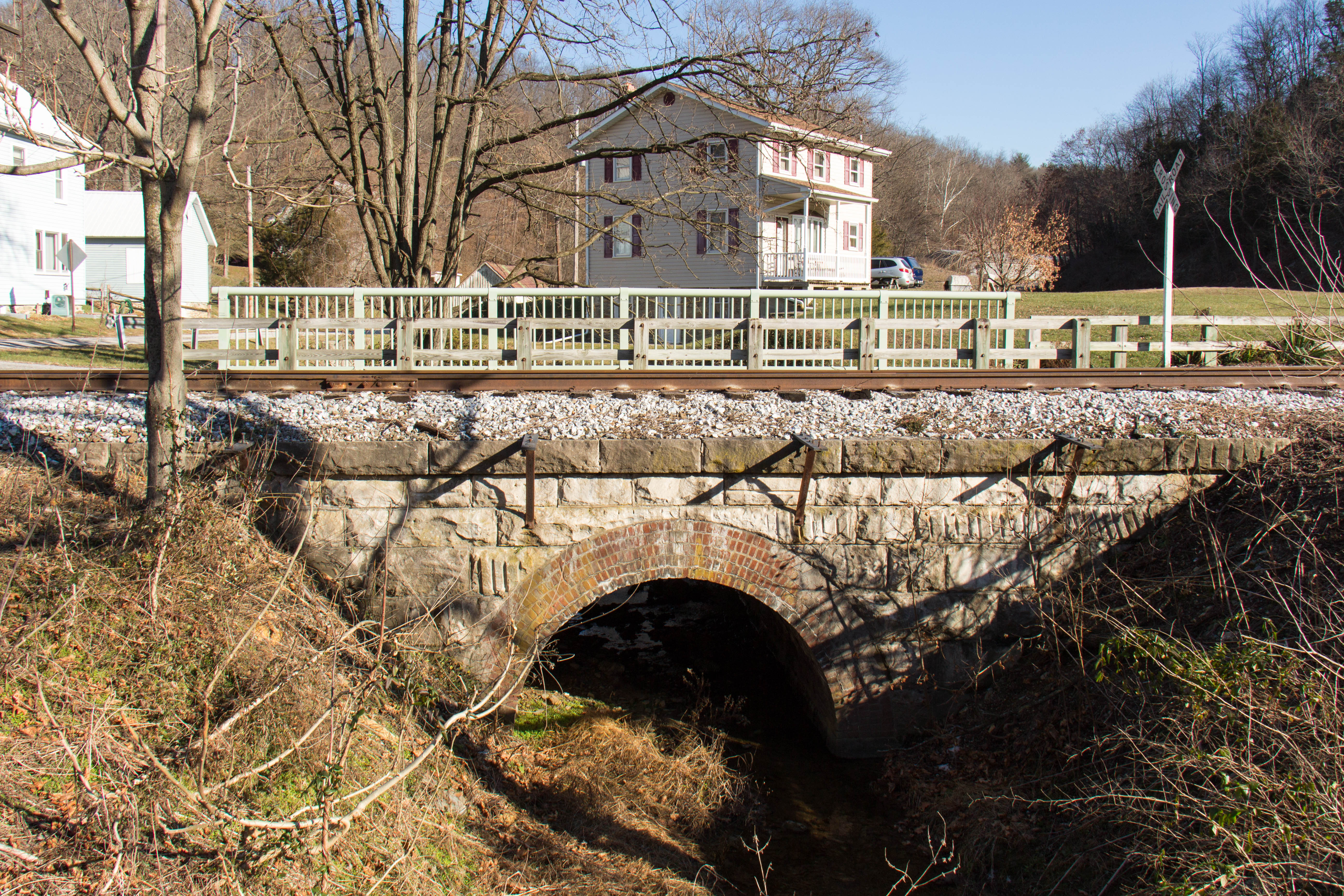

- Location within Pennsylvania Location within the United States
- Location: Former Northern Central railroad tracks over an unnamed creek at the South Branch of the Codorus Creek, at Larue, Springfield Township, Pennsylvania
- Coordinates: 39°49′14″N 76°45′39″W
- Area: less than one acre
- Built: c. 1871
- Architectural style: Masonry Arch
- MPS: Railroad Resources of York County MPS
- NRHP reference No.: 95000549
- Added to NRHP: May 4, 1995

South Road Bridge, Northern Central Railway is a historic stone arch railroad bridge in Springfield Township, York County, Pennsylvania, USA. It was built about 1871. The limestone and brick bridge was built by the Northern Central Railway and crosses the South Branch Codorus Creek.

It was added to the National Register of Historic Places in 1995.
