= Codorus Creek =

Stream in Pennsylvania, U.S.

Coordinates: 39.74504°N 76.83140°W

Physical characteristics
- Source
  - location: Beecher Hill
- Length: 42.4 mi (68.2 km)
- Basin size: Susquehanna River

Codorus Creek is a 42.4-mile-long (68.2 km) tributary of the Susquehanna River in York County, Pennsylvania, in the United States.

== Course ==
Codorus Creek (Native American for "rapid water") rises on Beecher Hill in Manheim Township, just 2 miles (3 km) north of the Pennsylvania-Maryland line and the town of Lineboro, Maryland. The initial stretch of the stream, sometimes known as the West Branch, flows northwest to Menges Mills, then turns northeast and flows past Spring Grove and New Salem to a junction with the South Branch approximately 0.8 miles (1.3 km) upstream of the Pennsylvania Route 182 crossing. The Army Corps of Engineers Indian Rock Dam, a flood control project, is located approximately 0.7 miles (1.1 km) upstream of the confluence with the South Branch. Codorus Creek then flows for 15.4 miles (24.8 km) to join the Susquehanna River near the community of Saginaw, passing through the center of the city of York along the way.

Efforts are underway to create the Codorus Creek water trail. Trails are planned for the main branch from Indian Rock to near the confluence with the Susquehanna and the South and West branches.

== Bridges ==
Bridge 182+42 and Bridge 634 built by the Northern Central Railway cross Codorus Creek in Shrewsbury Township.

== South Branch Codorus Creek ==
The South Branch joins the main stem (or "West Branch") approximately 0.8 miles (1.3 km) upstream of the Pennsylvania Route 182 crossing, to form Codorus Creek. The source of the South Branch is in the borough of New Freedom, 1.4 miles (2.3 km) north of the Maryland line, and the stream flows 21.6 miles (34.8 km) northwards to its junction with the main stem.

The tributary East Branch Codorus Creek is impounded to create Lake Williams and Lake Redman, part of the water supply system for the city of York.

The tributary Centerville Creek enters the South Branch above Glen Rock.

The South Road Bridge, Northern Central Railway crosses the South Branch Codorus Creek in Springfield Township, Pennsylvania.

== Watershed association ==
The Codorus Creek Watershed Association (CCWA) is a non-profit, all volunteer watershed organization dedicated to preserving and restoring the entire Codorus Creek watershed for today's generation and for generations to come. CCWA is actively (2011) involved in restoration activities at local tributary called Oil Creek near Hanover, and was recently awarded grant funding for another local tributary, Barshinger Creek, near Red Lion. Additional grants are pending final approval (April 2011) for two additional locations in the watershed.

== See also ==
- List of rivers of Pennsylvania
