= Manheim Township, York County, Pennsylvania =

Township in Pennsylvania, US

Coordinates: 39°44′30″N 76°52′59″W

- Township
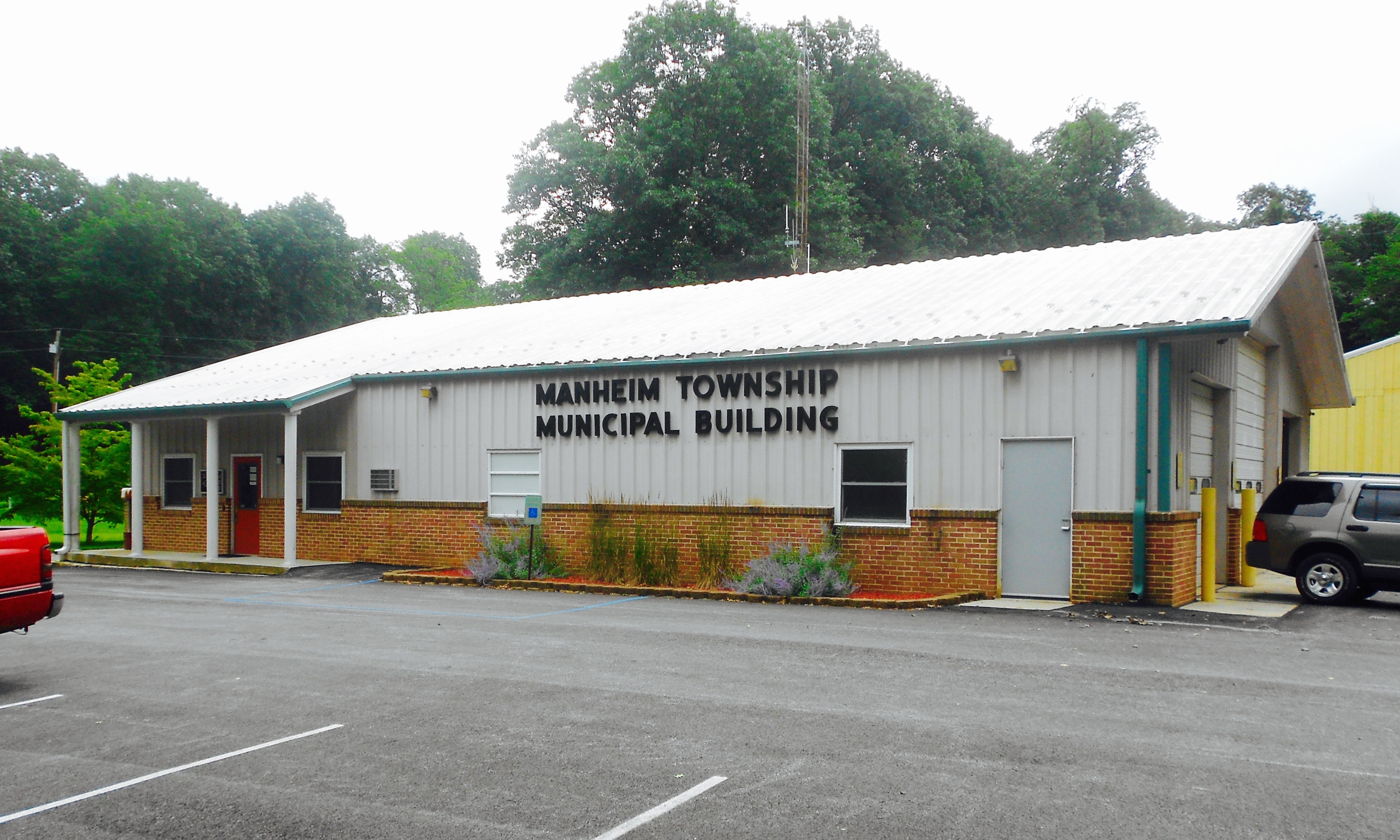
- Town hall

- Location of Manheim Township in York County, Pennsylvania (left) and of York County in Pennsylvania (right)
- Country: United States
- State: Pennsylvania
- County: York
- Settled: 1732
- Incorporated: 1747

Government
  - Type: Board of Supervisors

Area
  - Total: 22.51 sq mi (58.29 km^{2})
  - Land: 21.54 sq mi (55.80 km^{2})
  - Water: 0.96 sq mi (2.49 km^{2})

Population (2020)
  - Total: 3,460 ▲
  - Estimate (2023): 3,506
  - Density: 160.5/sq mi (61.97/km^{2})
- Time zone: UTC-5 (Eastern (EST))
  - Summer (DST): UTC-4 (EDT)
- Area code: 717
- FIPS code: 42-133-46904
- Website: Official website

Manheim Township is a township in York County, Pennsylvania, United States. As of the 2020 census, the township population was 3,460.

== Geography ==
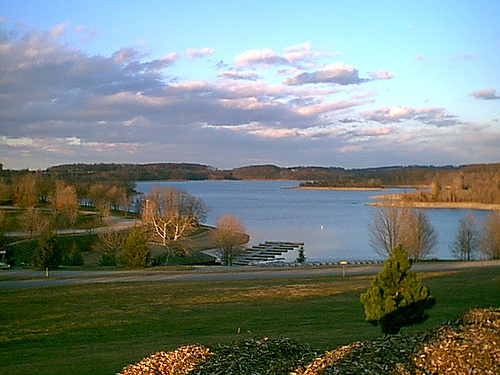
Codorus State Park

According to the U.S. Census Bureau, the township has a total area of 22.5 square miles (58 km^{2}), of which 21.5 square miles (56 km^{2}) is land and 0.9 square miles (2.3 km^{2}), or 4.10%, is water.

== Demographics ==
Historical population
Census	Pop.	Note	%±
1850	1,806		—
1860	1,091		−39.6%
1870	1,159		6.2%
1880	1,293		11.6%
1890	1,258		−2.7%
1900	1,226		−2.5%
1910	1,382		12.7%
1920	1,336		−3.3%
1930	1,189		−11.0%
1940	1,234		3.8%
1950	1,259		2.0%
1990	2,692		—
2000	3,119		15.9%
2010	3,380		8.4%
2020	3,460		2.4%
2023 (est.)	3,506		1.3%
U.S. Decennial Census

At the 2000 census, there were 3,119 people, 1,084 households, and 924 families living in the township. The population density was 144.8 inhabitants per square mile (55.9/km^{2}). There were 1,119 housing units at an average density of 52.0 per square mile (20.1/km^{2}). The racial makeup of the township was 98.62% White, 0.26% Native American, 0.29% Asian, 0.06% from other races, and 0.77% from two or more races. Hispanic or Latino of any race were 0.26%.

Of the 1,084 households 39.6% had children under the age of 18 living with them, 76.8% were married couples living together, 5.3% had a female householder with no husband present, and 14.7% were non-families. 11.5% of households were one person and 4.3% were one person aged 65 or older. The average household size was 2.88 and the average family size was 3.11.

The age distribution was 27.7% under the age of 18, 5.5% from 18 to 24, 30.0% from 25 to 44, 27.5% from 45 to 64, and 9.3% 65 or older. The median age was 38 years. For every 100 females there were 104.0 males. For every 100 females age 18 and over, there were 100.9 males.

The median household income was $57,407 and the median family income was $60,912. Males had a median income of $39,899 versus $24,408 for females. The per capita income for the township was $22,652. About 3.3% of families and 4.2% of the population were below the poverty line, including 1.7% of those under age 18 and 6.6% of those age 65 or over.

== Fire protection ==
Manheim Township is protected by three volunteer fire departments: the Lineboro Volunteer Fire Department out of Lineboro, Maryland protects the southern half of the township. Pleasant Hill Volunteer Fire Dept protects the northwestern quarter of the township, while the Jefferson Volunteer Fire Co. protects the northeastern quarter of the township.

== Emergency Medical Services ==
The Lineboro Volunteer Fire Department provides ALS or Advanced Life Support ambulance services to Manheim Township, and Pleasant Hill Volunteer Fire Co provides BLS or Basic Life Support ambulance services. Medic 2-90 from UPMC Hanover Hospital provides ALS care in 52 box areas or in the event that Station 7's ambulance is unavailable. Service 47, out of Jefferson Volunteer Fire Company, also provides BLS assistance services on Class 1 calls in parts of the township. STAT Medevac provides air ambulance services in the event of severe illness or injury.
