= Railroad, Pennsylvania =

Borough in Pennsylvania, US

- Borough
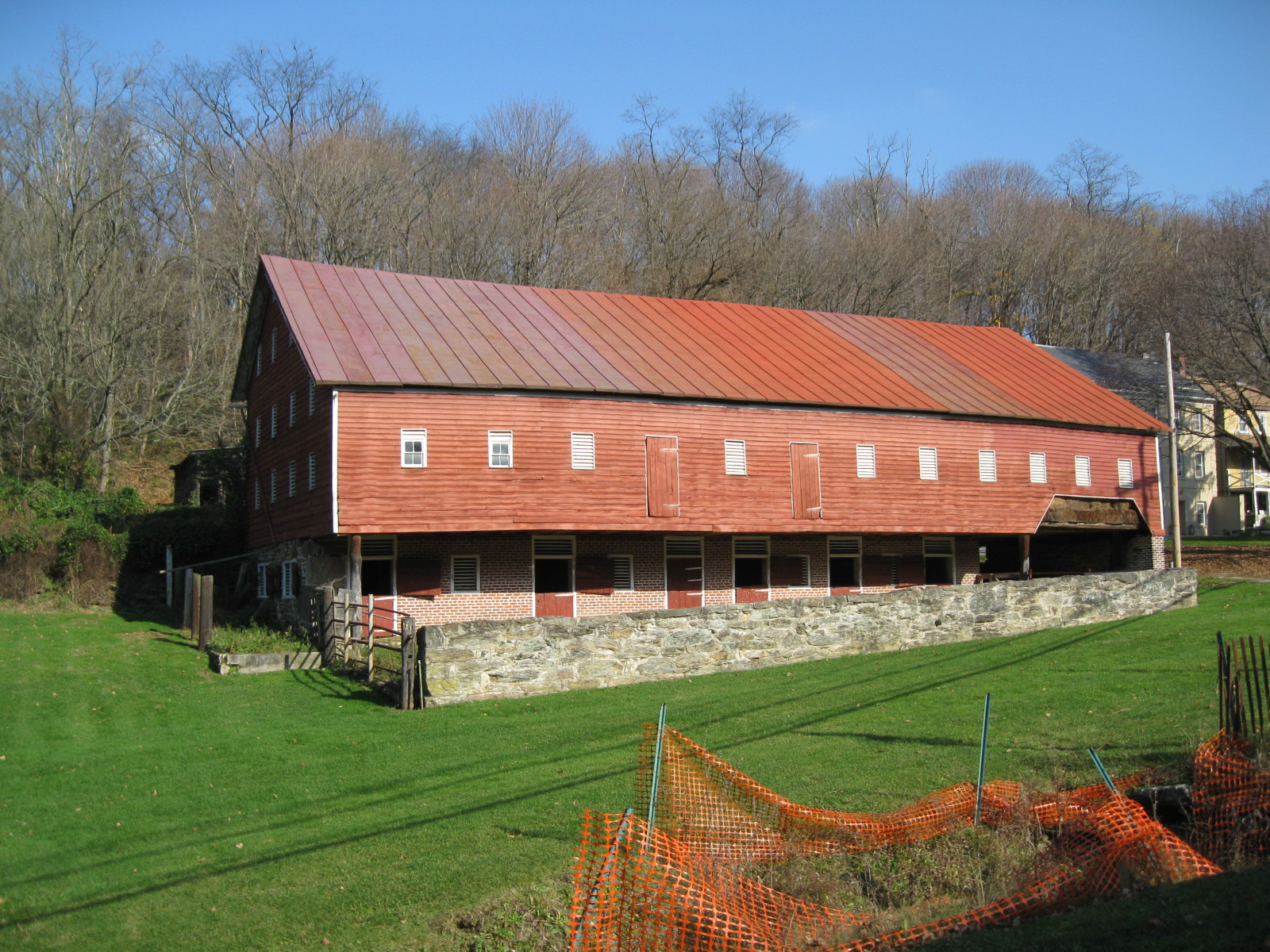

- Location in York County and the U.S. state of Pennsylvania.

- Location of Railroad in Pennsylvania Railroad (the United States)
- Coordinates: 39°45′24″N 76°41′58″W
- Country: United States
- State: Pennsylvania
- County: York
- Settled: 1792
- Incorporated: 1871

Government
  - Type: Borough Council

Area
  - Total: 0.64 sq mi (1.65 km^{2})
  - Land: 0.64 sq mi (1.65 km^{2})
  - Water: 0 sq mi (0.00 km^{2})
- Elevation: 804 ft (245 m)

Population (2020)
  - Total: 256
  - Density: 401.1/sq mi (154.86/km^{2})
- Time zone: UTC-5 (Eastern (EST))
  - Summer (DST): UTC-4 (EDT)
- Zip code: 17355
- Area code: 717
- FIPS code: 42-63288

Railroad is a borough in York County, Pennsylvania, United States. The population was 259 at the 2020 census. It is part of the York–Hanover metropolitan area.

== History ==
The borough of Railroad owes its existence, and its name, to what became the Northern Central Railway, which was built to connect Baltimore, Maryland and Harrisburg, Pennsylvania. The Railroad Borough Historic District was listed on the National Register of Historic Places in 1984.

Laura Randall described Railroad as a "tiny town of three hundred people near the Maryland border... home to the Jackson House B&B, a popular crab shack, and not much else."

== Geography ==
Railroad is located at 39°45′24″N 76°41′58″W (39.756761, -76.699396).

According to the United States Census Bureau, the borough has a total area of 0.64 square miles (1.7 km^{2}), all land.

== Demographics ==
Historical population
Census	Pop.	Note	%±
1880	220		—
1890	201		−8.6%
1900	213		6.0%
1910	308		44.6%
1920	310		0.6%
1930	268		−13.5%
1940	279		4.1%
1950	300		7.5%
1960	273		−9.0%
1970	308		12.8%
1980	272		−11.7%
1990	317		16.5%
2000	300		−5.4%
2010	278		−7.3%
2020	256		−7.9%
2021 (est.)	258	▲	0.8%

At the time of the 2000 census, there were three hundred people, one hundred and twelve households and seventy-nine families living in the borough.

The population density was 478.7 inhabitants per square mile (184.8/km^{2}). There were one hundred and sixteen housing units at an average density of 185.1 per square mile (71.5/km^{2}).

The racial makeup of the borough was 96.33% White, 1.67% African American and 2.00% Native American. Hispanic or Latino of any race were 0.67% of the population.

There were one hundred and twelve households, of which 41.1% had children under the age of eighteen living with them; 57.1% were married couples living together, 12.5% had a female householder with no husband present, and 28.6% were non-families. 24.1% of all households were made up of individuals, and 7.1% had someone living alone who was sixty-five years of age or older.

The average household size was 2.68 and the average family size was 3.16.

29.0% of the population were under the age of eighteen, 8.3% from eighteen to twenty-four, 33.7% from twenty-five to forty-four, 20.7% from forty-five to sixty-four, and 8.3% who were sixty-five years of age or older. The median age was thirty-six years.

For every one hundred females there were 98.7 males. For every one hundred females aged eighteen and over, there were 86.8 males.

The median household income was $37,917 and the median family income was $47,813. Males had a median income of $29,286 compared with that of $25,417 for females. The per capita income was $16,709.

Roughly 1.3% of families and 4.7% of the population were living below the poverty line, including 16.7% of those aged sixty-five or over. None were under the age of eighteen.
