= New Salem, Pennsylvania =

Borough in Pennsylvania, US

- Borough
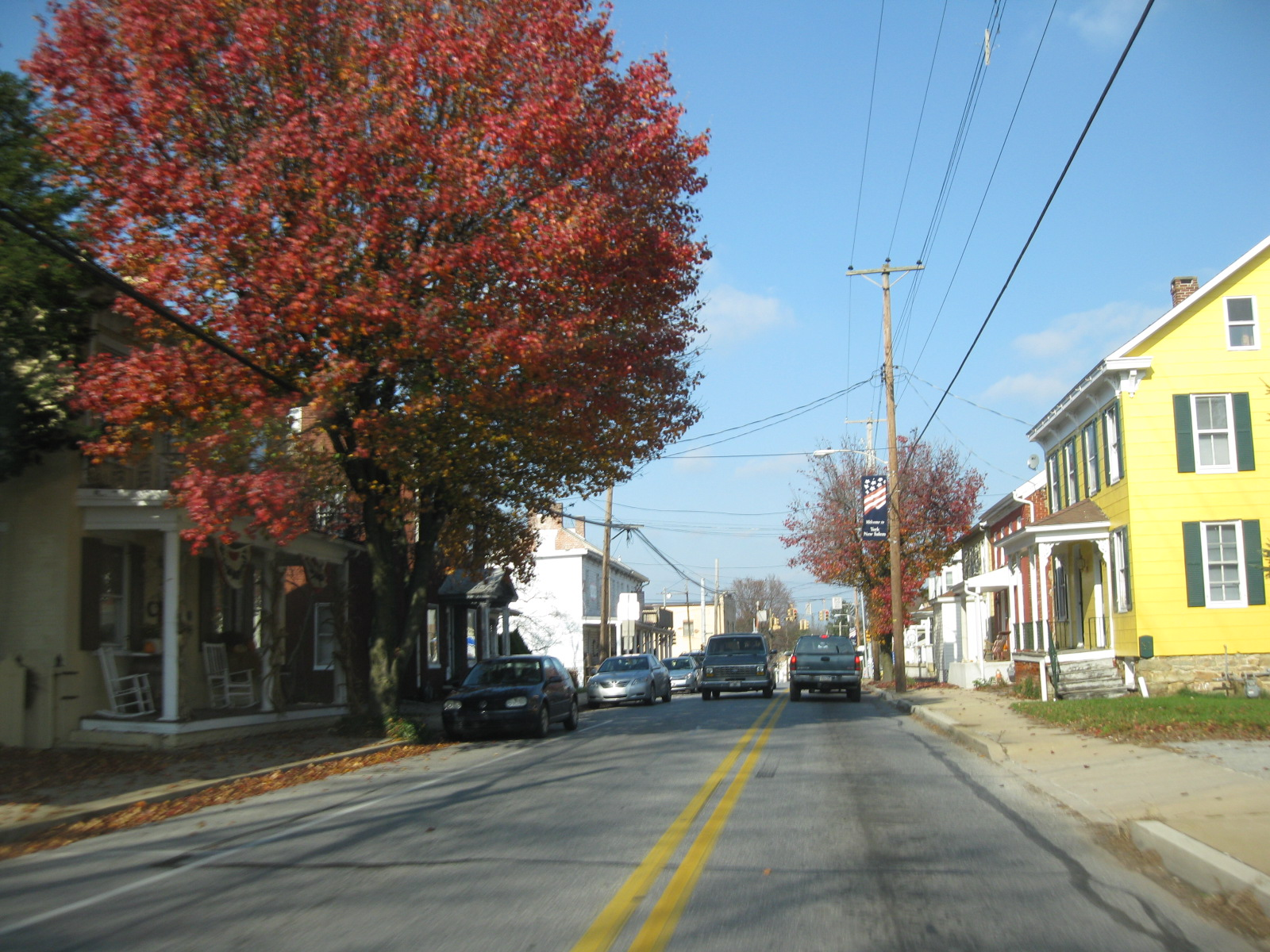
- PA Route 616 passes through New Salem

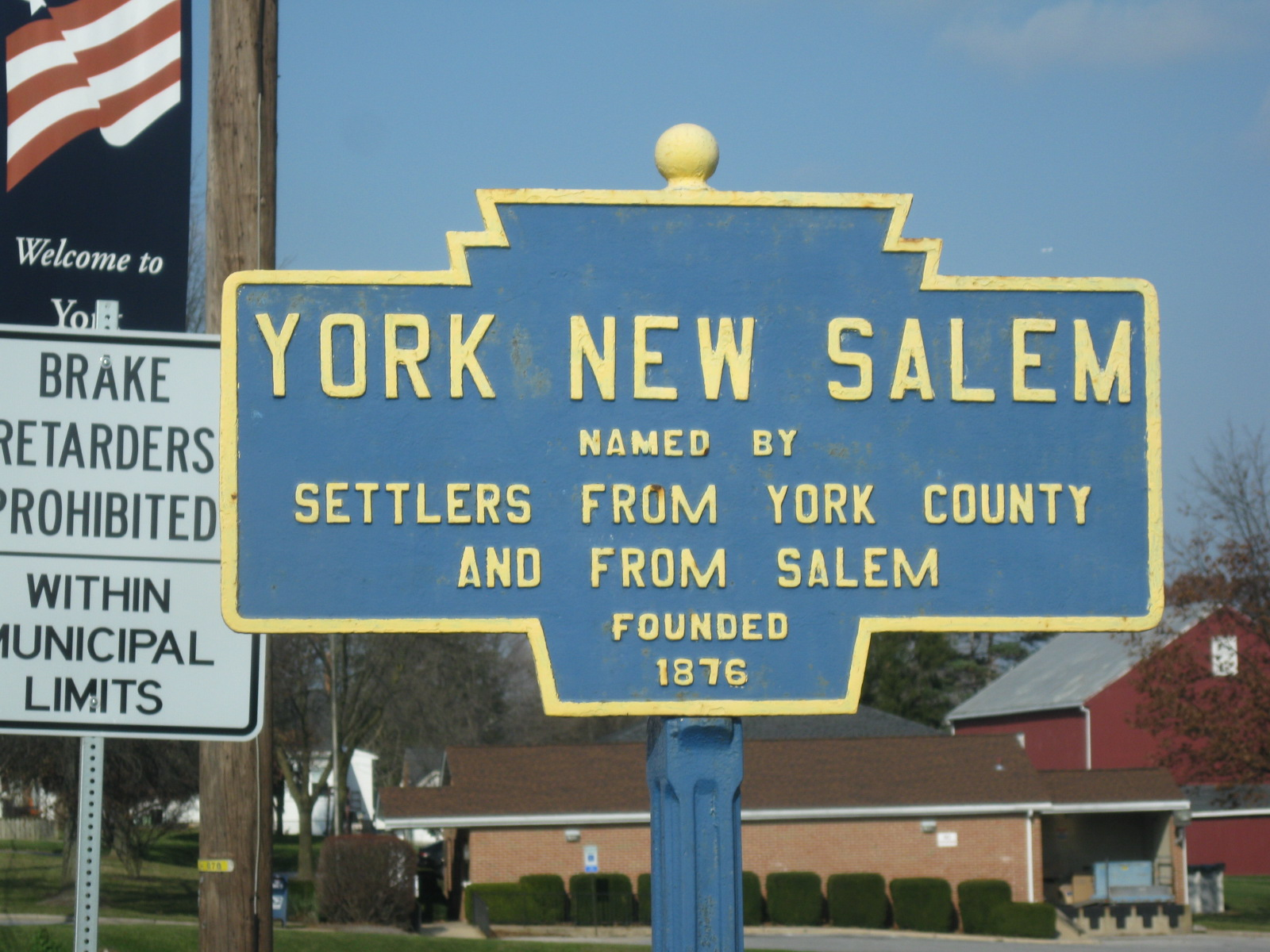
- Keystone Marker

- Location in York County and the U.S. state of Pennsylvania.

- Location of New Salem in Pennsylvania New Salem (the United States)
- Coordinates: 39°54′09″N 76°47′35″W
- Country: United States
- State: Pennsylvania
- County: York
- Incorporated: 1876

Government
  - Type: Borough Council

Area
  - Total: 0.47 sq mi (1.22 km^{2})
  - Land: 0.47 sq mi (1.22 km^{2})
  - Water: 0 sq mi (0.00 km^{2})
- Elevation: 636 ft (194 m)

Population (2020)
  - Total: 822
  - Density: 1,739.6/sq mi (671.65/km^{2})
- Time zone: UTC-5 (Eastern (EST))
  - Summer (DST): UTC-4 (EDT)
- Zip code: 17371
- Area code: 717
- FIPS code: 42-54056
- Website: https://newsalemborough.com/

New Salem is a borough in York County, Pennsylvania, United States. As of the 2020 census, the borough had a total population of 818. It is part of the York–Hanover metropolitan area.

== Geography ==
New Salem is located at 39°54'9" North, 76°47'35" West (39.902526, -76.793162).

According to the United States Census Bureau, the borough has a total area of 0.4 square miles (1.0 km^{2}), all land. New Salem lies near North Codorus Township. The town has two streets, two pizza shops, a gas station, bar, and post office.

== Demographics ==
Historical population
Census	Pop.	Note	%±
1880	224		—
1890	231		3.1%
1900	241		4.3%
1910	248		2.9%
1920	276		11.3%
1930	329		19.2%
1940	345		4.9%
1950	333		−3.5%
1960	350		5.1%
1970	384		9.7%
1980	832		116.7%
1990	669		−19.6%
2000	648		−3.1%
2010	724		11.7%
2020	822		13.5%
2021 (est.)	821	▼	−0.1%

As of the census of 2000, there were 648 people, 258 households, and 198 families residing in the borough. The population density was 1,427.6 inhabitants per square mile (551.2/km^{2}). There were 266 housing units at an average density of 586.0 per square mile (226.3/km^{2}). The racial makeup of the borough was 97.69% White, 0.31% African American, 0.00% Native American, 1.85% Asian, 0.00% Pacific Islander, 0.15% from other races, and 0.00% from two or more races. 0.31% of the population were Hispanic or Latino of any race.

There were 258 households, out of which 29.8% had children under the age of 18 living with them, 66.3% were married couples living together, 8.5% had a female householder with no husband present, and 22.9% were non-families. 19.0% of all households were made up of individuals, and 9.7% had someone living alone who was 65 years of age or older. The average household size was 2.51 and the average family size was 2.79.

In the borough the population was spread out, with 22.8% under the age of 18, 5.4% from 18 to 24, 29.2% from 25 to 44, 25.8% from 45 to 64, and 16.8% who were 65 years of age or older. The median age was 41 years. For every 100 females there were 97.6 males. For every 100 females age 18 and over, there were 96.9 males.

The median income for a household in the borough was $51,944, and the median income for a family was $53,295. Males had a median income of $39,028 versus $22,321 for females. The per capita income for the borough was $18,802. 3.9% of the population and 3.7% of families were below the poverty line. Out of the total population, 3.3% of those under the age of 18 and 6.5% of those 65 and older were living below the poverty line.

== History ==
New Salem, or York New Salem, added the prefix York because of a dispute between another borough with the same name in Pennsylvania. No two boroughs can have the same name for postal reasons, according to the federal government. New Salem was founded by settlers from Salem, Massachusetts and from settlers from nearby York.
