= Seven Valleys, Pennsylvania =

Borough in Pennsylvania, US

- Borough
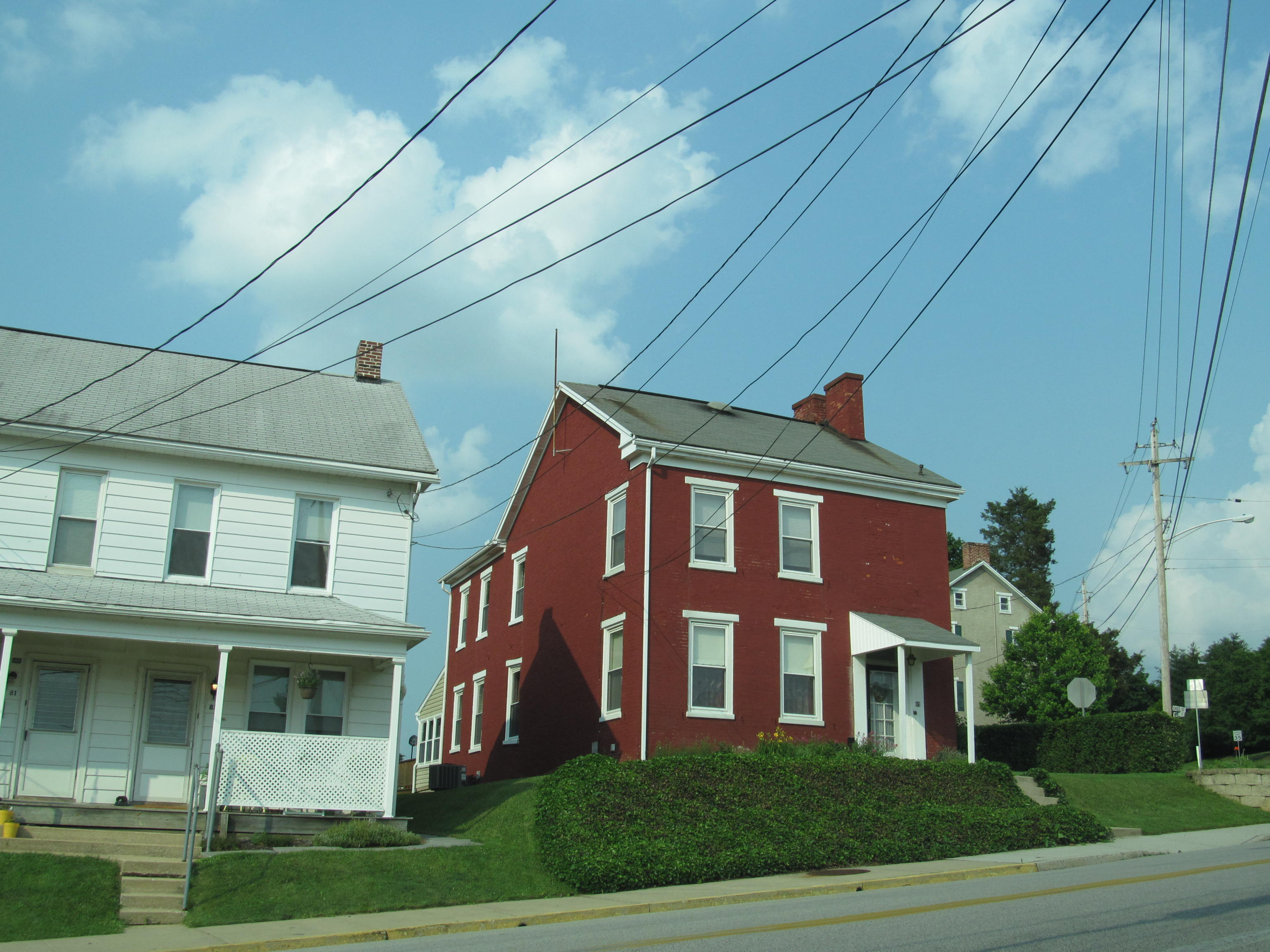

- Location in York County and the U.S. state of Pennsylvania.

- Location of Seven Valleys in Pennsylvania Seven Valleys (the United States)
- Coordinates: 39°51′22″N 76°46′01″W
- Country: United States
- State: Pennsylvania
- County: York
- Settled: 1740
- Incorporated: 1892

Government
  - Type: Borough Council
  - Mayor: Douglas J. Wagner

Area
  - Total: 1.09 sq mi (2.82 km^{2})
  - Land: 1.09 sq mi (2.82 km^{2})
  - Water: 0 sq mi (0.00 km^{2})
- Elevation: 476 ft (145 m)

Population (2020)
  - Total: 480
  - Density: 440.7/sq mi (170.14/km^{2})
- Time zone: UTC-5 (Eastern (EST))
  - Summer (DST): UTC-4 (EDT)
- Zip code: 17360
- Area code: 717
- FIPS code: 42-69360
- Website: www.sevenvalleysborough.com

Seven Valleys is a borough in York County, Pennsylvania, United States. The population was 480 at the 2020 census. It is part of the York–Hanover metropolitan area.

== History ==
The Seven Valleys basin was settled by forty families of the German Lutheran and Reformed faiths. They originated in the Hunsruck Mountains of the Rhineland Palatinate and arrived in this valley of the Codorus during the early fall of 1738. The lush meadows and gently rolling hills here reminded them of their homeland, even to the presence of seven valleys in the vicinity, and they called it Das Siebenthal, which in German means Seven Valleys.

By 1752 these religious hardworking farmers had organized churches and parochial schools, and holding fast to their German heritage, worshipped God and taught their children in the Pfalzer dialect of the German language for nearly 150 years.

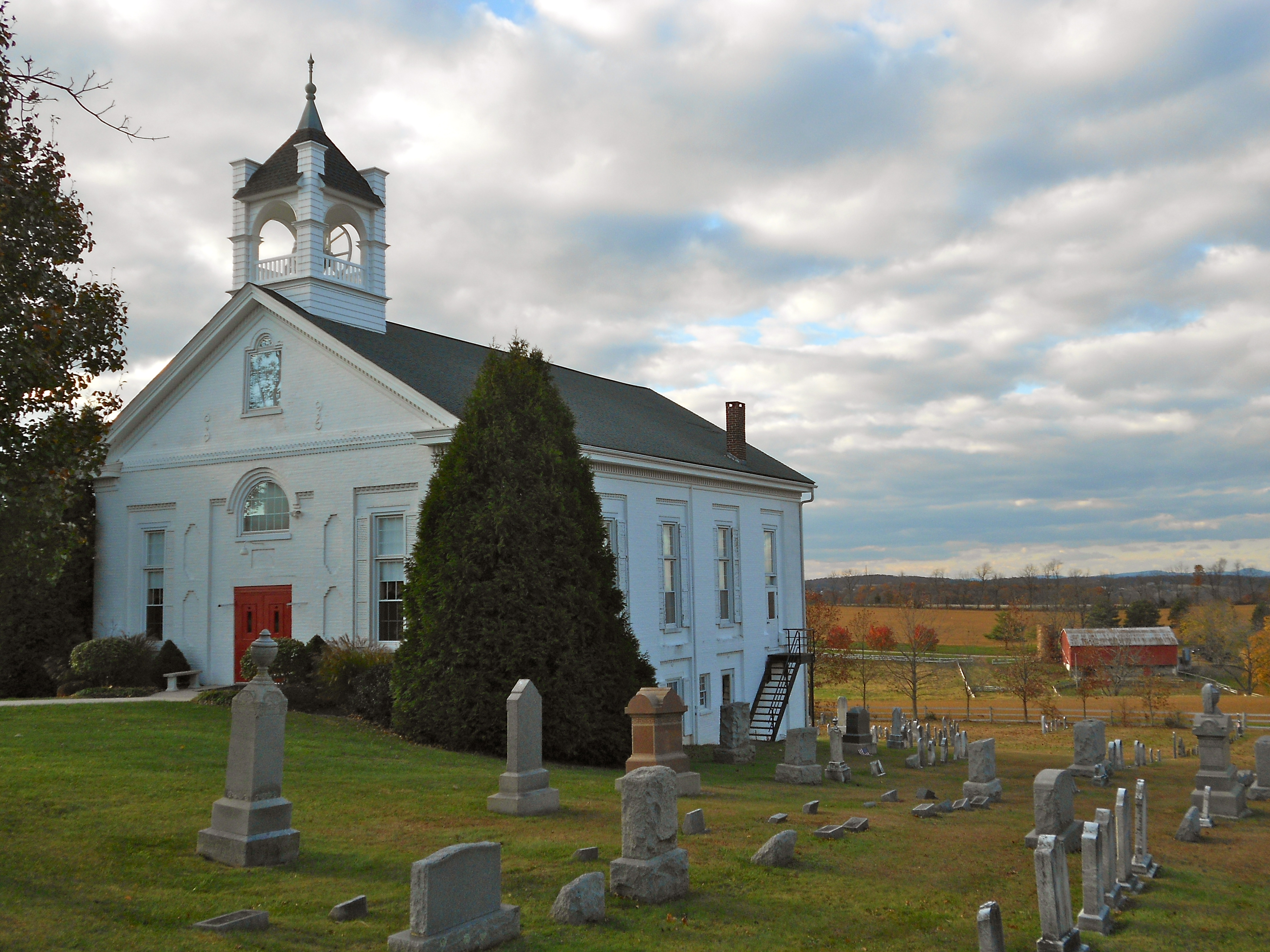
Friedensaal Church about two miles south of town

With the coming of the railroad in 1838 and the opportunity to trade commercially with the outside world, the use of the English language gradually crept into the culture and by the end of the Civil War the use of German slowly began fading into the background.

In 1854 iron ore was discovered here and a great wave of prosperity swept the people of the valley : hell-bent-for-leather" on into their golden age of the late 19th and early 20th century.

During the American Civil War, Seven Valleys served as an important stop along the North Central Railroad, and witnessed President Abraham Lincoln's funeral train pass by en route to Harrisburg.

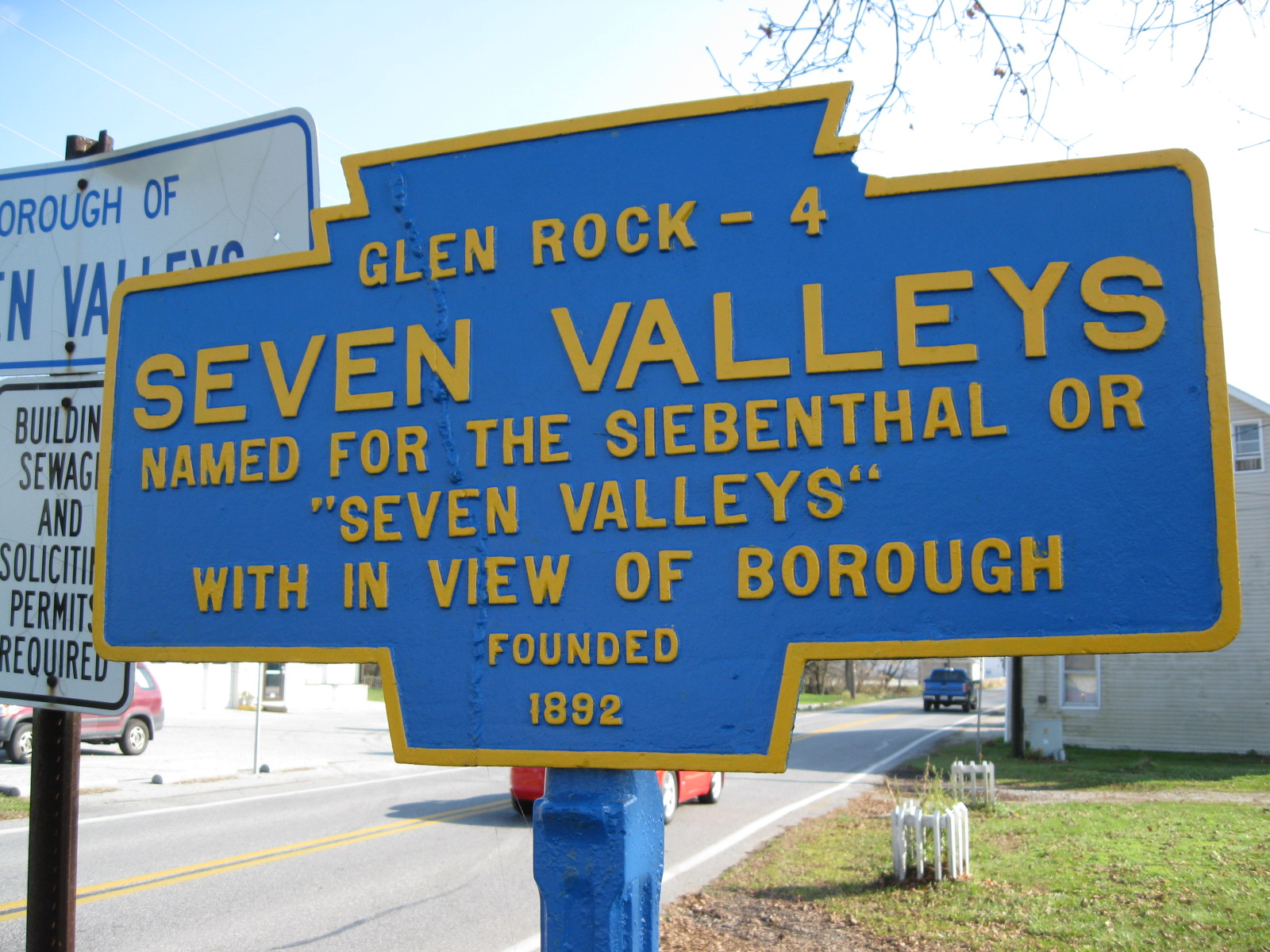
Keystone marker

On August 23, 1892 the village of Seven Valleys was incorporated into an independent entity and took its place among the small industrial towns of southern York County.

During its hey-day Seven Valleys was singularly noted for the manufacture of cigars and ice cream. The town boasted three physicians, one undertaker, two school teachers, two general stores, two hotels, two churches, two secret lodges, a baseball team, a feed and flour mill, two ice cream plants, a blacksmith shop, four cigar factories and a sewing factory, as well as numerous small entrepreneurial enterprises. It was a large railroad shipping point for cattle destined for the Baltimore markets and after a bank was founded in 1910 became the financial center for both North Codorus and Springfield Townships.

The Bridge 5+92, Northern Central Railway was added to the National Register of Historic Places in 1995.

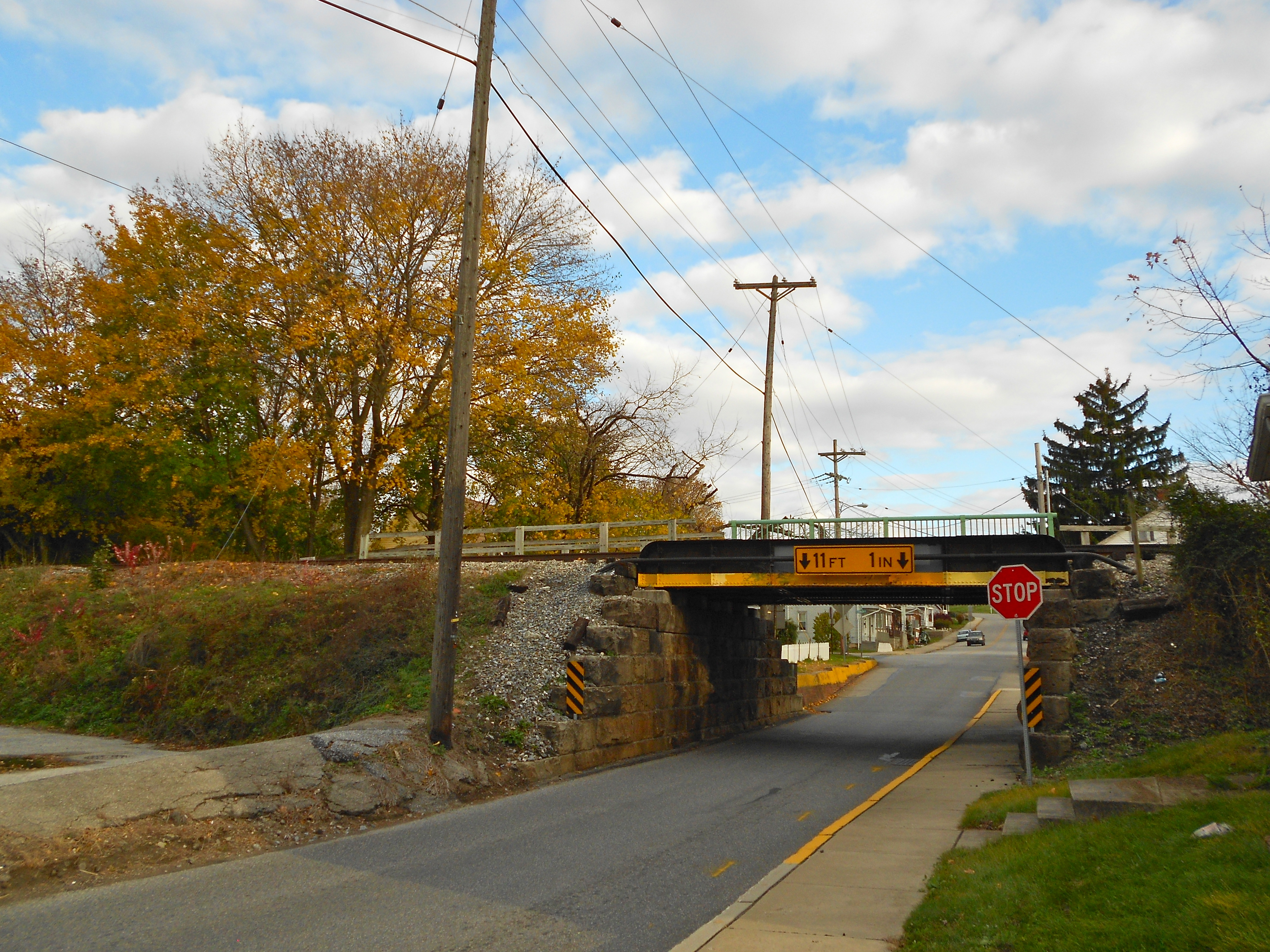
Northern Central Railroad bridge over Main Street

== Geography ==
Seven Valleys is located at 39°51′22″N 76°46′1″W (39.855975, -76.766920).

According to the United States Census Bureau, the borough has a total area of 1.1 square miles (2.8 km^{2}), all land.

== Demographics ==
Historical population
Census	Pop.	Note	%±
1900	428		—
1910	365		−14.7%
1920	384		5.2%
1930	405		5.5%
1940	398		−1.7%
1950	437		9.8%
1960	515		17.8%
1970	688		33.6%
1980	500		−27.3%
1990	483		−3.4%
2000	492		1.9%
2010	517		5.1%
2020	480		−7.2%
2021 (est.)	478	▼	−0.4%
U.S. Decennial Census

As of the census of 2000, there were 492 people, 188 households, and 134 families residing in the borough. The population density was 430.2 inhabitants per square mile (166.1/km^{2}). There were 204 housing units at an average density of 178.4 per square mile (68.9/km^{2}). The racial makeup of the borough was 97.97% White, 0.81% Native American, 0.20% Asian, 0.81% from other races, and 0.20% from two or more races. Hispanic or Latino of any race were 0.61% of the population.

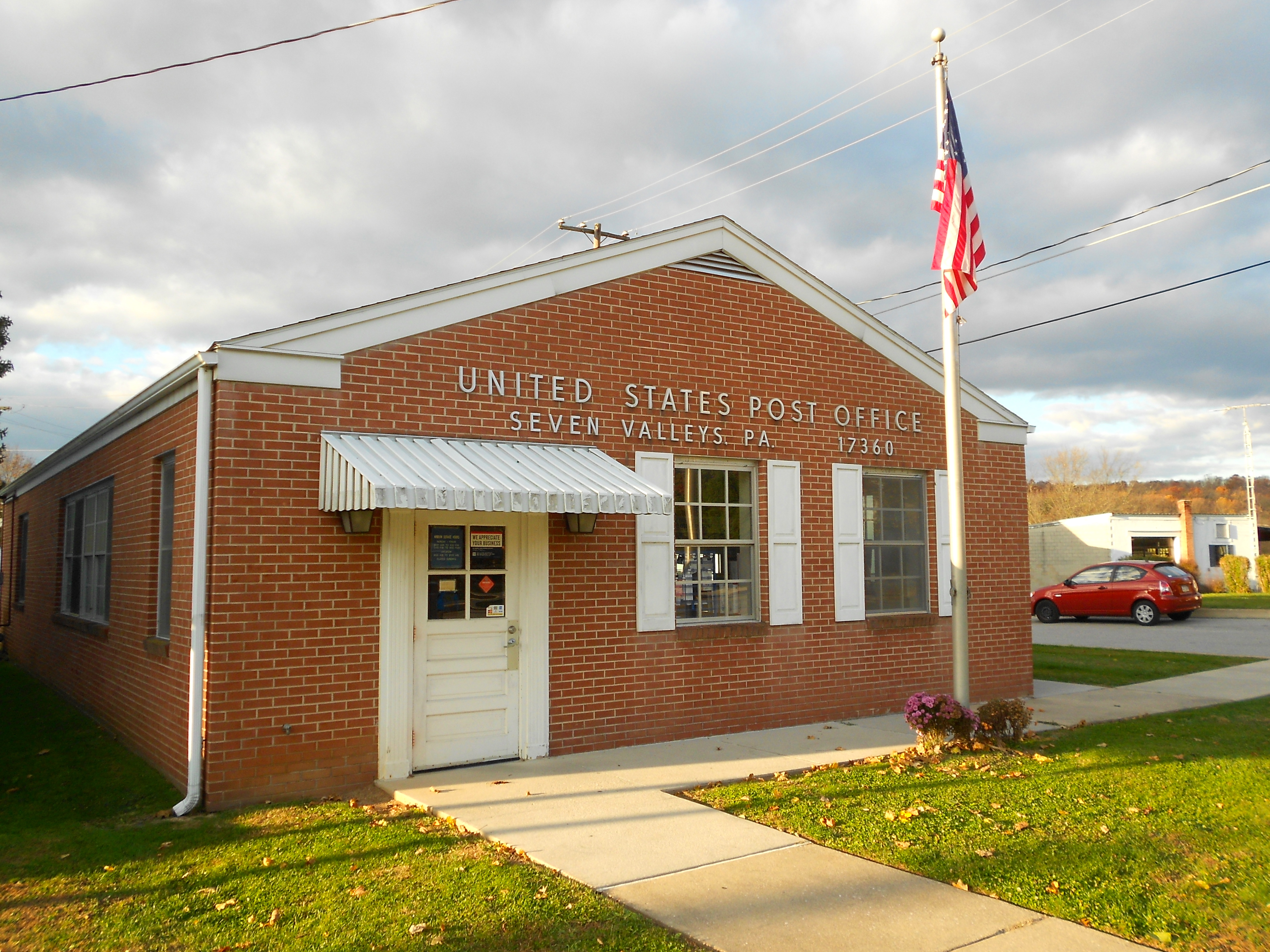
Post office

There were 188 households, out of which 32.4% had children under the age of 18 living with them, 58.0% were married couples living together, 9.6% had a female householder with no husband present, and 28.2% were non-families. 21.8% of all households were made up of individuals, and 11.2% had someone living alone who was 65 years of age or older. The average household size was 2.62 and the average family size was 3.02.

In the borough the population was spread out, with 26.2% under the age of 18, 9.1% from 18 to 24, 30.1% from 25 to 44, 20.5% from 45 to 64, and 14.0% who were 65 years of age or older. The median age was 36 years. For every 100 females there were 96.0 males. For every 100 females age 18 and over, there were 97.3 males.

The median income for a household in the borough was $43,542, and the median income for a family was $45,000. Males had a median income of $31,591 versus $21,912 for females. The per capita income for the borough was $17,544. About 2.3% of families and 4.5% of the population were below the poverty line, including 1.4% of those under age 18 and none of those age 65 or over.

== Education ==
The borough lies within the Spring Grove Area School District, with students attending New Salem Elementary, Spring Grove Area Middle School, Spring Grove Area Intermediate School, and Spring Grove Area High School. Liberty Christian Fellowship Church that sits on top of the hill in town was once the Seven Valleys Elementary school for grades 1–4 as another elementary school in the Spring Grove School District until the year 2000.
