= Loganville, Pennsylvania =

Borough in Pennsylvania, US

- Borough
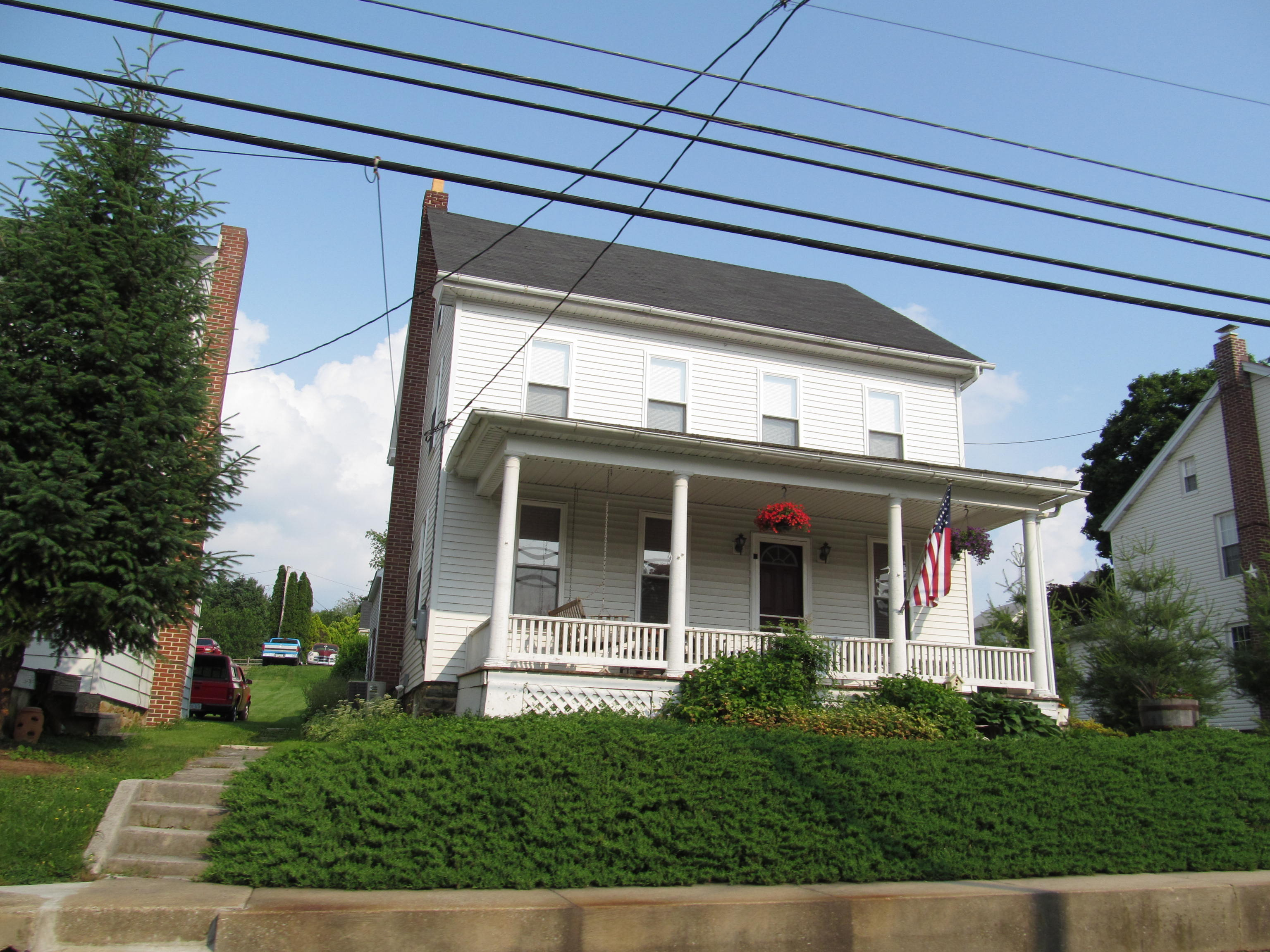

- Location in York County and the U.S. state of Pennsylvania.

- Location of Loganville in Pennsylvania Loganville (the United States)
- Coordinates: 39°51′19″N 76°42′30″W
- Country: United States
- State: Pennsylvania
- County: York
- Settled: 1820
- Incorporated: 1852

Government
  - Type: Borough Council
  - Mayor: Eric Mueller

Area
  - Total: 1.00 sq mi (2.59 km^{2})
  - Land: 1.00 sq mi (2.59 km^{2})
  - Water: 0 sq mi (0.00 km^{2})
- Elevation: 778 ft (237 m)

Population (2020)
  - Total: 1,426
  - Density: 1,425.8/sq mi (550.49/km^{2})
- Time zone: UTC-5 (Eastern (EST))
  - Summer (DST): UTC-4 (EDT)
- ZIP Code: 17342
- Area code: 717
- FIPS code: 42-44416
- Website: www.loganvillepa.us

Loganville is a borough in York County, Pennsylvania, United States. The population was 1,427 at the time of the 2020 census. It was founded in 1820 and named after Colonel Henry Logan. It is part of the York–Hanover metropolitan area.

== History ==
Established in the center of Springfield Township in York County, Pennsylvania in 1820, the land which would ultimately become the community of Loganville was surveyed by Robert Richie and plotted by auctioneer Robert Wilson, who later named the town in honor of Colonel Henry Logan, a prominent, 19th-century politician.

Wilson subsequently established the town's first post office, operating it from his home as his new town's first postmaster. He was succeeded by Samuel Keyser.

The town's first store was operated by Jacob Gipe; additional stores were subsequently opened and operated by Frederick Asper, Paul Burbank and Frederick Overmiller. Between 1830 and 1840, the town grew from one store, one hotel and twelve houses to include a total of twenty houses and a population of ninety.

The town was subsequently incorporated as a borough on April 2, 1852. Its first elected officials were Chief Burgess John F. Beck Sr., Assistant Burgess Michael Snyder, Judge John F. Beck, Constable Charles Overmiller, and borough council members Daniel Goodling, John Hildebrand, Adam Krout, Samuel Smith, and Frederick Venus. School directors were Joseph Hartman, Casper Hildebrand and Henry Kerlinger. Jacob Glatfelter and George H. Reever held positions as inspectors.

On August 20, 1858, musicians Henry Decker and Henry Kerlinger succeeded in forming the Loganville Cornet Band. The original membership roster also included Deterich Hildebrand.

George P. Yost, MD and George W. Holtzapple, MD were two of the community's first physicians.

By 1880, the borough's population had climbed to three hundred and twelve.

By the middle of that decade, leaders of the increasingly popular Logan Cornet Band had increased the ensemble's membership to twenty and had purchased new silver-plated instruments for its members, as well as a concert hall in which to host the band's performances.

Teachers in the community's public schools at that time included J. M. Bailey and E. B. Goodling.

== Geography ==
Loganville is located at 39°51′19″N 76°42′30″W (39.855156, -76.708459).

According to the United States Census Bureau, the borough has a total area of 1.0 square mile (2.6 km^{2}), all land.

== Demographics ==
Historical population
| Census | Pop. | Note | %± |
|---|---|---|---|
| 1860 | 221 | | — |
| 1870 | 256 | | 15.8% |
| 1880 | 312 | | 21.9% |
| 1890 | 296 | | −5.1% |
| 1900 | 343 | | 15.9% |
| 1910 | 298 | | −13.1% |
| 1920 | 284 | | −4.7% |
| 1930 | 404 | | 42.3% |
| 1940 | 408 | | 1.0% |
| 1950 | 569 | | 39.5% |
| 1960 | 742 | | 30.4% |
| 1970 | 921 | | 24.1% |
| 1980 | 1,020 | | 10.7% |
| 1990 | 954 | | −6.5% |
| 2000 | 908 | | −4.8% |
| 2010 | 1,240 | | 36.6% |
| 2020 | 1,426 | | 15.0% |
| 2021 (est.) | 1,446 | ▲ | 1.4% |

As of the census of 2000, there were nine hundred and eight people, three hundred and sixty-one households and two hundred and fifty-eight families living in the borough.

The population density was 914.1 inhabitants per square mile (352.9/km^{2}). There were three hundred seventy-seven housing units at an average density of 379.5 per square mile (146.5/km^{2}).

The racial makeup of the borough was 97.03% White, 0.33% African American, 0.33% Native American, 0.66% Asian, and 1.65% from two or more races. Hispanic or Latino of any race were 0.88% of the population.

There were three hundred sixty-one households, out of which 33.5% had children under the age of eighteen living with them; 61.5% were married couples living together, 6.4% had a female householder with no husband present, and 28.5% were non-families. 23.8% of all households were made up of individuals, and 11.1% had someone living alone who was sixty-five years of age or older.

The average household size was 2.52 and the average family size was 2.96.

In the borough the population was spread out, with 26.1% under the age of eighteen, 7.0% from eighteen to twenty-four, 27.8% from twenty-five to forty-four, 23.5% from forty-five to sixty-four, and 15.6% who were sixty-five years of age or older. The median age was thirty-seven years.

For every one hundred females there were 92.0 males. For every one hundred females aged eighteen and over, there were 88.0 males.

The median income for a household in the borough was $37,857, and the median income for a family was $47,266. Males had a median income of $35,875 compared with that of $22,438 for females. The per capita income for the borough was $18,101.

Roughly 3.9% of families and 6.2% of the population were below the poverty line, including 10.0% of those under age 18 and 2.9% of those age 65 or over.
