= Stewartstown =

Stewartstown may refer to:

== United Kingdom ==
- Stewartstown, County Tyrone, a village in Northern Ireland
  - Stewartstown Harps GFC, a GAA club
  - Stewartstown railway station, a disused Great Northern Railway station
- Stewartstown, Belfast, a city council ward in the Collin electoral district

== United States ==
- Stewartstown, New Hampshire
- Stewartstown, Pennsylvania
  - Stewartstown Railroad, a heritage railroad
    - Stewartstown Engine House, Stewartstown Railroad, a historic railroad engine house
    - Stewartstown station (Pennsylvania), a historic railroad station
- Stewartstown, West Virginia
