= Shrewsbury, Pennsylvania =

Borough in Pennsylvania, US

- Borough
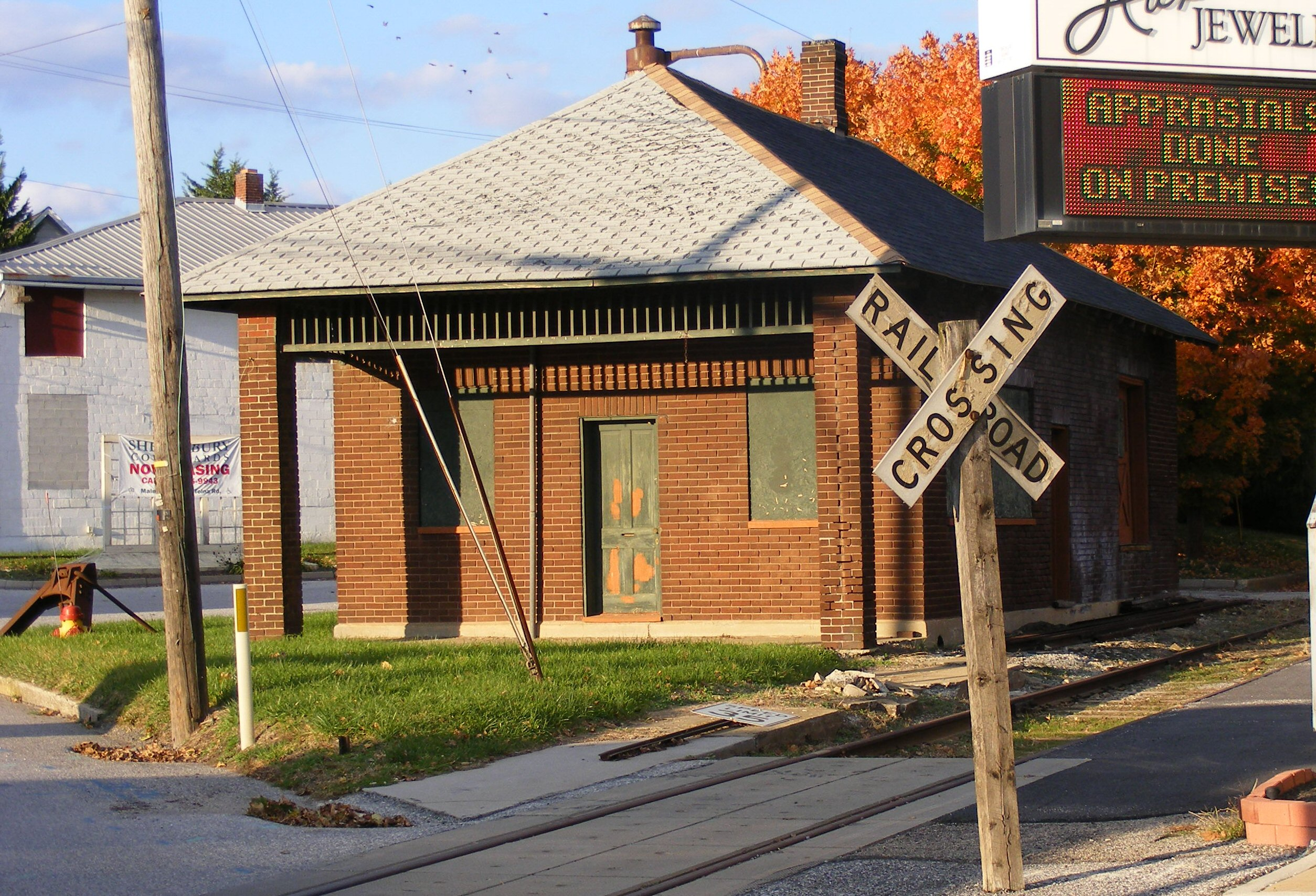
- Stewartstown Railroad Rail station at Shrewsbury

- Location in York County and the U.S. state of Pennsylvania.

- Location of Shrewsbury in Pennsylvania Shrewsbury (the United States)
- Coordinates: 39°46′02″N 76°40′44″W
- Country: United States
- State: Pennsylvania
- County: York
- Settled: 1800
- Incorporated: 1834

Government
  - Type: Borough Council
  - Mayor: Michael Sharkey

Area
  - Total: 1.81 sq mi (4.68 km^{2})
  - Land: 1.81 sq mi (4.68 km^{2})
  - Water: 0 sq mi (0.00 km^{2})
- Elevation: 994 ft (303 m)

Population (2020)
  - Total: 3,848 ▲
  - Estimate (2021): 3,845
  - Density: 2,132.6/sq mi (823.39/km^{2})
- Time zone: UTC-5 (Eastern (EST))
  - Summer (DST): UTC-4 (EDT)
- ZIP Code: 17361
- Area code: 717
- FIPS code: 42-70568
- Website: www.shrewsburyborough.org

Shrewsbury is a borough in York County, Pennsylvania, United States. The population was 3,848 at the time of the 2020 census. It is part of the York–Hanover metropolitan area.

Shrewsbury is considered a borough and also has a neighboring township. Neighboring towns of Shrewsbury are New Freedom and Glen Rock.

== History ==
At one time, the land that is now Shrewsbury Borough was part of one large area called Shrewsbury Township. In 1797, Baltzer (Balthaser) Faust began to develop the village by laying out lots on both sides of Joppa Road (later the York-Baltimore Turnpike and now Main Street). The early settlers were mostly German and the town was called Strassburg, which means “the town by the street or road.” By 1830 there was enough of an influx of English people to reinstate “Shrewsbury” as the official name. On August 9, 1834, the Borough of Shrewsbury was incorporated by an Act of the General Assembly. The area delineated was approximately one mile long and one-half mile wide, stretching lengthwise along the turnpike, with the borough center located at the crossroads. The city lined the streets with American sycamores (platanus occidentalis). The Shrewsbury Historic District was listed on the National Register of Historic Places in 1984.

== Geography ==
Shrewsbury is located at 39°46′2″N 76°40′44″W (39.767127, -76.678965).

According to the United States Census Bureau, the borough has a total area of 1.8 square miles (4.7 km^{2}), all land.

== Demographics ==
Historical population
| Census | Pop. | Note | %± |
|---|---|---|---|
| 1840 | 340 | | — |
| 1850 | 472 | | 38.8% |
| 1860 | 552 | | 16.9% |
| 1870 | 600 | | 8.7% |
| 1880 | 565 | | −5.8% |
| 1890 | 562 | | −0.5% |
| 1900 | 554 | | −1.4% |
| 1910 | 598 | | 7.9% |
| 1920 | 568 | | −5.0% |
| 1930 | 671 | | 18.1% |
| 1940 | 720 | | 7.3% |
| 1950 | 787 | | 9.3% |
| 1960 | 943 | | 19.8% |
| 1970 | 1,716 | | 82.0% |
| 1980 | 2,688 | | 56.6% |
| 1990 | 2,672 | | −0.6% |
| 2000 | 3,378 | | 26.4% |
| 2010 | 3,823 | | 13.2% |
| 2020 | 3,848 | | 0.7% |
| 2021 (est.) | 3,845 | ▼ | −0.1% |

=== 2020 census ===
As of the 2020 census, Shrewsbury had a population of 3,848. The median age was 47.5 years. 19.3% of residents were under the age of 18 and 24.2% of residents were 65 years of age or older. For every 100 females there were 91.3 males, and for every 100 females age 18 and over there were 88.5 males age 18 and over.

99.6% of residents lived in urban areas, while 0.4% lived in rural areas.

There were 1,545 households in Shrewsbury, of which 28.0% had children under the age of 18 living in them. Of all households, 54.6% were married-couple households, 15.0% were households with a male householder and no spouse or partner present, and 25.0% were households with a female householder and no spouse or partner present. About 28.8% of all households were made up of individuals and 17.8% had someone living alone who was 65 years of age or older.

There were 1,617 housing units, of which 4.5% were vacant. The homeowner vacancy rate was 1.3% and the rental vacancy rate was 5.0%.

Racial composition as of the 2020 census
| Race | Number | Percent |
|---|---|---|
| White | 3,438 | 89.3% |
| Black or African American | 124 | 3.2% |
| American Indian and Alaska Native | 6 | 0.2% |
| Asian | 62 | 1.6% |
| Native Hawaiian and Other Pacific Islander | 1 | 0.0% |
| Some other race | 28 | 0.7% |
| Two or more races | 189 | 4.9% |
| Hispanic or Latino (of any race) | 160 | 4.2% |

=== 2000 census ===
As of the census of 2000, there were three thousand three hundred and seventy-eight people, one thousand three hundred and thirty households and nine hundred and forty-two families residing in the borough.

The population density was 1,916.4 inhabitants per square mile (739.9/km^{2}). There were one thousand three hundred and sixty-seven housing units at an average density of 775.5 per square mile (299.4/km^{2}).

The racial makeup of the borough was 97.48% White, 0.80% African American, 0.15% Native American, 0.77% Asian, 0.15% Pacific Islander, 0.27% from other races, and 0.38% from two or more races. Hispanic or Latino of any race were 0.98% of the population.

There were one thousand three hundred and thirty households, out of which 32.3% had children under the age of eighteen living with them; 61.4% were married couples living together, 7.1% had a female householder with no husband present, and 29.1% were non-families. 26.1% of all households were made up of individuals, and 14.6% had someone living alone who was sixty-five years of age or older. The average household size was 2.54 and the average family size was 3.08.

In the borough the population was spread out, with 25.7% under the age of eighteen, 6.0% from eighteen to twenty-four, 28.5% from twenty-five to forty-four, 26.2% from forty-five to sixty-four, and 13.6% who were sixty-five years of age or older. The median age was forty years.

For every one hundred females there were 92.5 males. For every one hundred females aged eighteen and over, there were 88.7 males.

The median income for a household in the borough was $49,983, and the median income for a family was $57,358. Males had a median income of $39,107 compared with that of $32,196 for females. The per capita income for the borough was $20,292.

Roughly 2.4% of families and 4.7% of the population were below the poverty line, including 1.5% of those under age eighteen and 15.2% of those aged sixty-five or over.

== Education ==
Shrewsbury is located within the Southern York County School District, which includes Shrewsbury Elementary School, Southern Middle School and Susquehannock High School. Shrewsbury also has a public library, the Paul Smith Library of Southern York County
