= Ron Wolf =

American football general manager (born 1938)

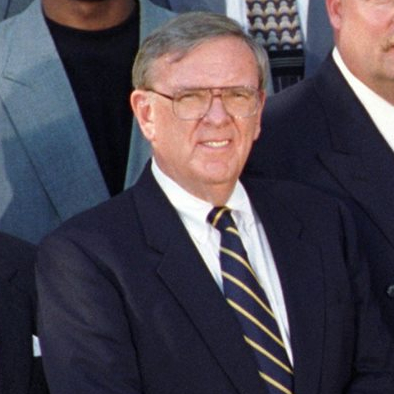
- Wolf in 1997

Personal information
- Born: December 30, 1938 (age 87); New Freedom, Pennsylvania, U.S.

Career information
- High school: Susquehannock (Glen Rock, Pennsylvania)
- College: Maryville

Career history
- Oakland Raiders (1963–1974) Scout; Tampa Bay Buccaneers (1976–1978) Vice president of football operations; Oakland / Los Angeles Raiders (1979–1989) Scout; New York Jets (1990–1991) Personnel director; Green Bay Packers (1991–2000) General manager

Awards and highlights
- 3× Super Bowl champion (XV, XVIII, XXXI); Green Bay Packers Hall of Fame; Sporting News Executive of the Year (1992)
- Executive profile at Pro Football Reference
- Pro Football Hall of Fame

Ronald Wolf (born December 30, 1938) is an American former professional football executive who was a general manager (GM) of the National Football League (NFL)'s Green Bay Packers. Wolf is widely credited with bringing success to a Packers franchise that had rarely won during the two decades prior to Wolf joining the organization. He also played a significant role in personnel operations with the Oakland and Los Angeles Raiders from 1963 to 1975 and again from 1978 to 1990. He joined Green Bay's front office in November 1991 from a personnel director's job with the New York Jets. He was inducted into the Pro Football Hall of Fame in August 2015.

== Early life ==
Wolf was born in New Freedom, Pennsylvania on December 30, 1938. After serving three years in the Army, Wolf played college baseball at Maryville College in Tennessee. After college, he worked for Pro Football Illustrated, a Chicago sports newspaper.

== Executive career ==
=== Oakland/Los Angeles Raiders ===
Wolf became a scout for the Raiders in 1963. With the Raiders, Wolf took part in drafting such notable players as Art Shell, Gene Upshaw, Ken Stabler, and Jack Tatum, all of whom would play for the Super Bowl XI Championship team in 1976, and later such players as Howie Long, Marcus Allen, and Matt Millen, all of the Super Bowl XVIII Championship team in 1983, the then Los Angeles Raiders.

After the death of Raiders owner Al Davis, Wolf was rumored to possibly come back to Oakland. He didn't specify that he wanted to have a full-time job as general manager there, but he told the new ownership team that he would assist them with anything they needed. In an interview with the Milwaukee Journal Sentinel he supported Green Bay Packers director of football operations, Reggie McKenzie, as a perfect candidate for the GM position in Oakland and called him a "tremendous evaluator" when it came to finding players.

=== Tampa Bay Buccaneers ===
In 1975, Wolf joined the expansion Tampa Bay Buccaneers as vice-president of operations prior to their first season in 1976. He helped build the team that would advance to the 1979 NFC Championship game. His first draft choice was Lee Roy Selmon, a future Hall of Fame player. He would not be around to see his team develop, however, as he resigned his position with the Buccaneers in February 1978, citing "personal matters". It is believed that he had difficulty working with Buccaneer owner Hugh Culverhouse, and that Culverhouse was trying to interfere with personnel decisions. Wolf later indicated that Culverhouse's close personal relationship with and strong financial stake in coach John McKay meant that Wolf had to be the one to pay with his job for the team's start in their first two seasons, which had them lose their first 26 games as a franchise; Wolf noted his problems in trying to find an ideal quarterback in those first two seasons along with noting his pleasure at having met his future wife in Tampa due to meeting her at the condo complex they each lived in. Wolf returned to the Raiders on the expiration of his Buccaneer contract.

=== Green Bay Packers ===
In 1991, Wolf was hired to replace Packers General Manager Tom Braatz. Wolf's first major decisions were to fire head coach Lindy Infante, hire then-San Francisco 49ers offensive coordinator Mike Holmgren to replace him, and to trade for then-Atlanta Falcons backup quarterback Brett Favre, whom Wolf had wanted to draft while working with the Jets. In 1993, Wolf signed the most sought-after free agent available, Reggie White, bringing in a team leader and defensive superstar. This signing, in NFL free agency's first year, also made Green Bay a more desirable destination for future potential free agents, including White's fellow defensive linemen Santana Dotson and Sean Jones. Specifically, White's arrival negated the perception of Green Bay as a city where African-American players did not feel welcome. With White and cast-off Gilbert Brown, Dotson and Jones formed the heart of the Packer defense during the team's championship run.

Wolf is credited with remaking the Packers into a perennial winner and championship contender. From 1968 to 1991, the Packers had only four winning seasons. Over Wolf's nine-year term as GM, the Packers compiled a 92–52 record, good for a .639 winning percentage, second in the NFL over that span only to the San Francisco 49ers. The Packers won Super Bowl XXXI against the New England Patriots, lost in Super Bowl XXXII to the Denver Broncos, and made the playoffs six straight times, winning a total of nine playoff games. Wolf announced he would retire as Packers GM in February 2001. He stayed on through the April NFL draft and officially retired as Packers GM in June 2001. Afterward the Packers head coach at that time, Mike Sherman, assumed Wolf's duties as GM. In 2000, Wolf was inducted into the Green Bay Packers Hall of Fame.

=== San Diego Chargers ===
On December 31, 2012, San Diego Chargers President Dean Spanos retained Wolf as a consultant to advise the Chargers throughout the general manager and head coach hiring process.

=== New York Jets ===
From 1990 to 1991, Wolf served as personnel director for the New York Jets.

On December 28, 2014, Wolf later joined Charley Casserly as a consultant for the Jets in their search for a new head coach and general manager, following the firing of Rex Ryan and John Idzik Jr.

=== Pro Football Hall of Fame ===
On October 22, 2014, Wolf was selected as a finalist to be a member in the Pro Football Hall of Fame as a contributor (designation for individuals who were neither a player nor a coach).

On January 31, 2015, Wolf was confirmed as a member of the 2015 Hall of Fame class. He was inducted on August 8.

== Personal life ==
Wolf's son, Eliot Wolf, is currently the de facto general manager of the New England Patriots, a role he has served since 2024.
