= Stewarton (disambiguation) =

Stewarton is a town in East Ayrshire, Scotland.

Stewarton, Stuart Town, and similar names may also refer to:

- Stewarton, Argyll, Scotland; a village
- Stewarton, Queensland, Australia; a locality in the Central Highlands Region
- Stewarton, Victoria, Australia
- Stewarttown, Ontario, Canada; neighborhood in Halton Hills
- Stuarton, Wigtownshire, Scotland; former name for Kirkcolm, a village and parish
- Stuart Town, New South Wales, Australia; a town on the Central Western Slopes
- Kirkcolm (formerly Stewarton), Dumfries and Galloway, Scotland

== See also ==
- Stuart Towne, pen name of Clayton Rawson (1906–71) an American mystery writer
- Stewartstown (disambiguation)
