= Shrewsbury Township, York County, Pennsylvania =

Township in Pennsylvania, US

Coordinates: 39°44′00″N 76°45′05″W

- Township
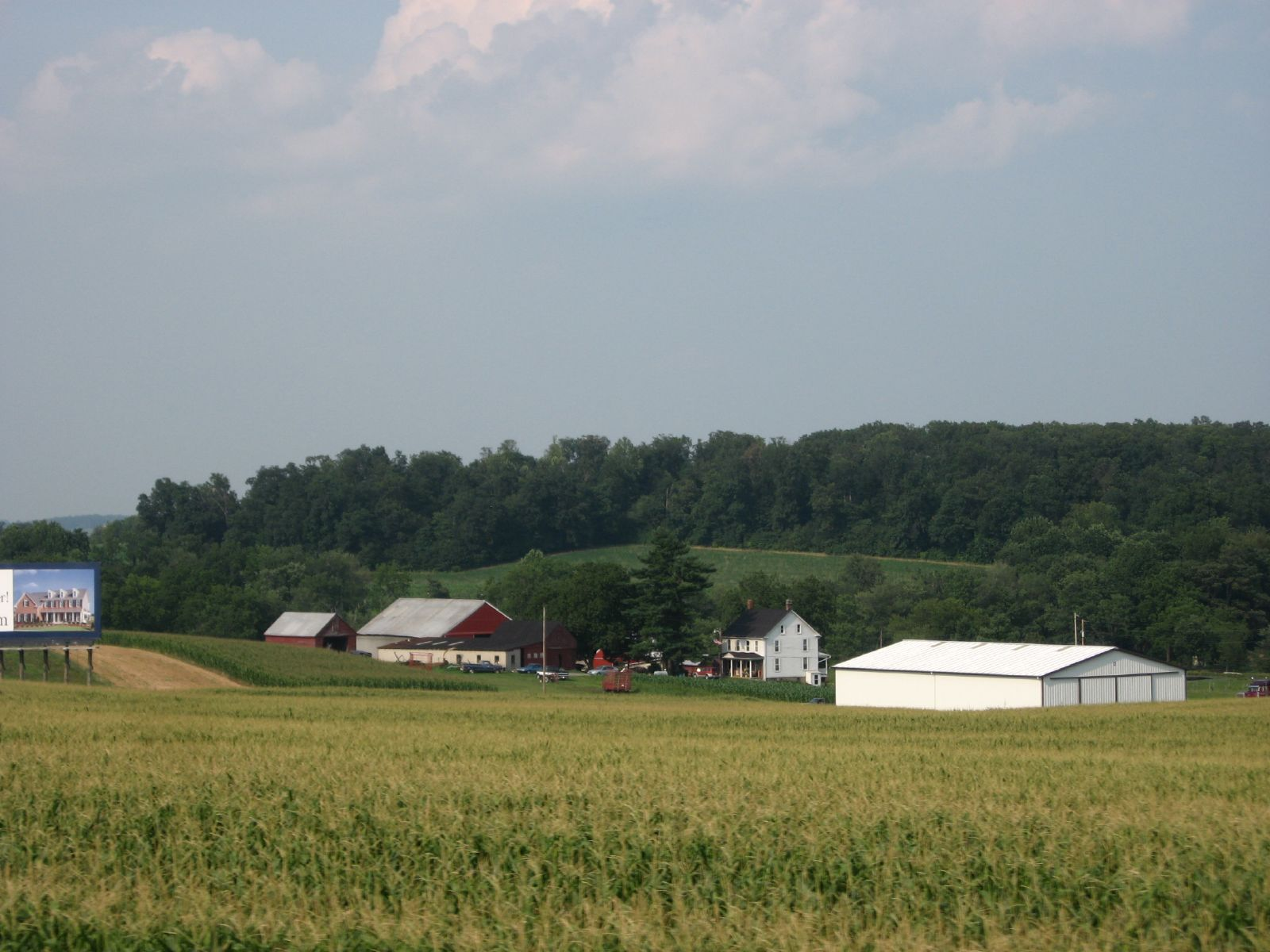
- A farm just off Interstate 83 in Shrewsbury Township

- Location in York County and the state of Pennsylvania.
- Country: United States
- State: Pennsylvania
- County: York
- Settled: 1739
- Incorporated: 1742

Government
  - Type: Board of Supervisors

Area
  - Total: 29.07 sq mi (75.30 km^{2})
  - Land: 29.07 sq mi (75.28 km^{2})
  - Water: 0.0077 sq mi (0.02 km^{2})

Population (2020)
  - Total: 6,657 ▲
  - Estimate (2023): 7,048
  - Density: 230.4/sq mi (88.96/km^{2})
- Time zone: UTC-5 (Eastern (EST))
  - Summer (DST): UTC-4 (EDT)
- Area code: 717
- FIPS code: 42-133-70576

Historical population
Census	Pop.	Note	%±
1930	1,952		—
1940	2,069		6.0%
1950	2,163		4.5%
1960	2,471		14.2%
1970	2,578		4.3%
1980	4,551		76.5%
1990	5,898		29.6%
2000	5,947		0.8%
2010	6,447		8.4%
2020	6,657		3.3%
2023 (est.)	7,048		5.9%
U.S. Decennial Census

Shrewsbury Township is a township in York County, Pennsylvania, United States. The population was 6,657 at the 2020 census.

== History ==
The Fissel's School, Bridge 634, Northern Central Railway, Bridge 182+42, Northern Central Railway, and Stone Arch Road Bridge, Stewartstown Railroad are listed on the National Register of Historic Places.

== Geography ==
According to the United States Census Bureau, the township has a total area of 29.2 square miles (76 km^{2}), of which 0.03% is water. The township is located in southern York County adjacent to the Maryland-Pennsylvania border and along Interstate 83, between York to the north and Baltimore to the south. Shrewsbury Township surrounds the boroughs of Shrewsbury, Glen Rock, Railroad, and New Freedom.

== Demographics ==
At the 2000 census there were 5,947 people, 2,157 households, and 1,729 families living in the township. The population density was 203.4 inhabitants per square mile (78.5/km^{2}). There were 2,206 housing units at an average density of 75.4 per square mile (29.1/km^{2}). The racial makeup of the township was 98.52% White, 0.30% African American, 0.03% Native American, 0.45% Asian, 0.20% from other races, and 0.49% from two or more races. Hispanic or Latino of any race were 0.92%.

Of the 2,157 households 33.8% had children under the age of 18 living with them, 71.3% were married couples living together, 5.2% had a female householder with no husband present, and 19.8% were non-families. 16.8% of households were one person and 7.9% were one person aged 65 or older. The average household size was 2.71 and the average family size was 3.04.

The age distribution was 24.5% under the age of 18, 5.7% from 18 to 24, 25.4% from 25 to 44, 31.0% from 45 to 64, and 13.4% 65 or older. The median age was 42 years. For every 100 females, there were 98.6 males. For every 100 females age 18 and over, there were 96.8 males.

The median household income was $58,191 and the median family income was $65,966. Males had a median income of $40,038 versus $30,391 for females. The per capita income for the township was $24,841. About 2.2% of families and 3.8% of the population were below the poverty line, including 5.0% of those under age 18 and 1.9% of those age 65 or over.

== Notable person ==
- Daniel Peterman, fraktur artist
