= Hopewell Township, York County, Pennsylvania =

Township in Pennsylvania, US

Coordinates: 39°44′00″N 76°32′59″W

- Township
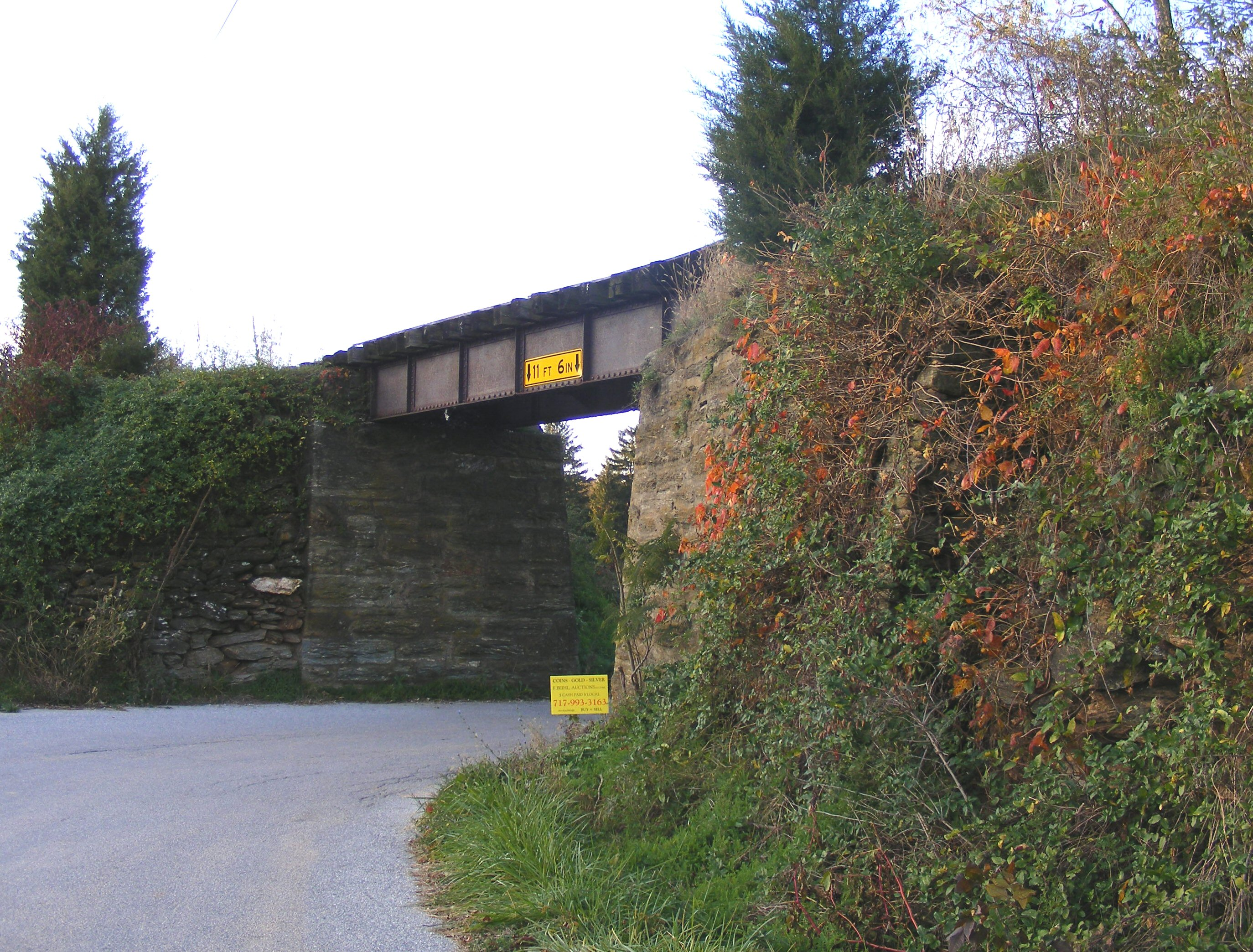
- Ridge Road Bridge, built for the Stewartstown Railroad

- Location in York County and the state of Pennsylvania.
- Country: United States
- State: Pennsylvania
- County: York
- Settled: 1734
- Incorporated: 1767

Government
  - Type: Board of Supervisors

Area
  - Total: 26.78 sq mi (69.36 km^{2})
  - Land: 26.78 sq mi (69.36 km^{2})
  - Water: 0 sq mi (0.00 km^{2})

Population (2020)
  - Total: 5,267 ▼
  - Estimate (2023): 5,370
  - Density: 203.7/sq mi (78.63/km^{2})
- Time zone: UTC-5 (Eastern (EST))
  - Summer (DST): UTC-4 (EDT)
- Area code: 717
- FIPS code: 42-133-35704

Historical population
Census	Pop.	Note	%±
1850	2,432		—
1860	3,366		38.4%
1870	3,830		13.8%
1880	3,773		−1.5%
1890	1,540		−59.2%
1900	1,376		−10.6%
1910	1,275		−7.3%
1920	1,266		−0.7%
1930	1,181		−6.7%
1940	1,114		−5.7%
1950	1,305		17.1%
1960	1,330		1.9%
1970	1,728		29.9%
1980	2,600		50.5%
1990	3,177		22.2%
2000	5,062		59.3%
2010	5,435		7.4%
2020	5,267		−3.1%
2023 (est.)	5,370		2.0%
U.S. Decennial Census

Hopewell Township is a township in York County, Pennsylvania, United States. The population was 5,267 at the 2020 census. It is served by the South Eastern School District, which provides public education.

== History ==
Prior to 1885, Hopewell Township included present-day Hopewell Township, East Hopewell Township, and North Hopewell Township; thus, the original township extended as far north as that of York. The Deer Creek Bridge, Stewartstown Railroad, Ridge Road Bridge, Stewartstown Railroad, and Valley Road Bridge, Stewartstown Railroad are listed on the National Register of Historic Places.

== Geography ==
According to the United States Census Bureau, the township has a total area of 26.9 square miles (70 km^{2}), all land. The township completely surrounds the borough of Stewartstown.

== Demographics ==
As of the census of 2000, there were 5,062 people, 1,766 households, and 1,464 families living in the township. The population density was 188.2 inhabitants per square mile (72.7/km^{2}). There were 1,842 housing units at an average density of 68.5 units per square mile (26.4 units/km^{2}). The racial makeup of the township was 97.97% White, 0.71% African American, 0.12% Native American, 0.34% Asian, 0.02% Pacific Islander, 0.32% from other races, and 0.53% from two or more races. Hispanic or Latino of any race were 0.99% of the population.

There were 1,766 households, out of which 41.7% had children under the age of 18 living with them, 73.9% were married couples living together, 5.8% had a female householder with no husband present, and 17.1% were non-families. 13.8% of all households were made up of individuals, and 5.3% had someone living alone who was 65 years of age or older. The average household size was 2.85 and the average family size was 3.15.

In the township the population was spread out, with 29.2% under the age of 18, 4.6% from 18 to 24, 33.0% from 25 to 44, 24.5% from 45 to 64, and 8.8% who were 65 years of age or older. The median age was 37 years. For every 100 females there were 101.0 males. For every 100 females age 18 and over, there were 99.1 males.

The median income for a household in the township was $60,692, and the median income for a family was $63,931. Males had a median income of $42,784 versus $30,531 for females. The per capita income for the township was $21,611. About 3.2% of families and 4.1% of the population were below the poverty line, including 2.6% of those under age 18 and none of those age 65 or over.
