= Shrewsbury station =

Shrewsbury station may refer to:

- Shrewsbury railway station in England, United Kingdom
- Shrewsbury station (Pennsylvania), United States
