= Deer Creek Bridge, Stewartstown Railroad =

- Deer Creek Bridge, Railroad
- U.S. National Register of Historic Places
- Location within Pennsylvania Location within the United States
- Location: Railroad tracks over Deer Creek at Deer Creek Road, east of Shrewsbury, Hopewell Township and Shrewsbury Township, Pennsylvania
- Coordinates: 39°45′30″N 76°38′55″W
- Area: less than one acre
- Built: c. 1895
- Architectural style: Girder
- MPS: Railroad Resources of York County MPS
- NRHP reference No.: 95000544
- Added to NRHP: May 4, 1995

Deer Creek Bridge, Railroad was a historic railroad bridge in Hopewell Township and Shrewsbury Township, York County, Pennsylvania. It was built about 1895, and measures 34-foot-6-inch-long (10.52 m) and 9-foot-wide (2.7 m) overall. The girder bridge was built by the Stewartstown Railroad. The bridge crosses Deer Creek.

It was added to the National Register of Historic Places in 1995.
