= Southern York County School District =

School district in Pennsylvania

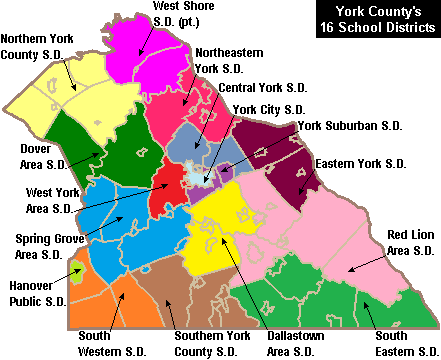

Address
- 3280 Fissels Church Rd Glen Rock, York County, Pennsylvania, 17327; United States

District information
- Type: Public
- Motto: An Absolute Commitment to the Highest Level of Academic Achievement

Other information
- Website: www.syc.k12.pa.us

The Southern York County School District is a suburban, public school district in York County in the South Central region of Pennsylvania. It serves Codorus Township, Glen Rock, Railroad, New Freedom, Shrewsbury Township, Shrewsbury, and a portion of Hopewell Township. Southern York County School District encompasses approximately 68 square miles (180 km^{2}). According to 2000 federal census data, it served a resident population of 18,592 people. By 2010, the district's population increased to 20,858 people. The educational attainment levels for the Southern York County School District population (25 years old and over) were 89.3% high school graduates and 26.5% college graduates.

According to the Pennsylvania Budget and Policy Center, 20.2% of the district's pupils lived at 185% or below the Federal Poverty level as shown by their eligibility for the federal free or reduced price school meal programs in 2012. In 2009, the Southern York County School District residents’ per capita income was $22,345, while the median family income was $60,438. In York County, the median household income was $57,494. In the Commonwealth, the median family income was $49,501 and the United States median family income was $49,445, in 2010.

Southern York County School District operates 5 schools: Friendship Elementary School, Shrewsbury Elementary School, Southern Elementary School, Southern Middle School, and Susquehannock High School. High school students may choose to attend York County School of Technology for training in the construction and mechanical trades. The Lincoln Intermediate Unit IU12 provides the district with a wide variety of services like specialized education for disabled students and hearing, speech and visual disability services and professional development for staff and faculty.

== History ==
In 2020 the district removed a Native American logo. The removal was effective in April 2021.

Circa January 2024, after a recent election, the composition of the school board change, with members of the Republican Party having five of seven seats. In 2024 the board of education reinstituted the Native American logo with seven voting for and two voting against.

== Extracurriculars ==
The district offers a variety of clubs, activities and an extensive sports program.

=== Sports ===
The district funds:

Boys

- Baseball – AA
- Basketball- AAA
- Cross Country – AA
- Football – AAA
- Golf – AAA
- Lacrosse – AA
- Soccer – AA
- Swimming and Diving – AA
- Tennis – AAA
- Track and Field – AAA
- Volleyball – A
- Wrestling – AAA

Girls

- Basketball – AAA
- Cross Country – AA
- Field Hockey – AA
- Lacrosse – AAAA
- Soccer (Fall) – AA
- Softball – AAA
- Swimming and Diving – AA
- Girls' Tennis – AAA
- Track and Field – AAA
- Volleyball – AAA

Middle School Sports

Boys

- Basketball
- Cross Country
- Football
- Track and Field
- Wrestling

Girls

- Basketball
- Cross Country
- Field Hockey
- Track and Field
- Volleyball

According to PIAA directory July 2012
