= Bridge 182+42, Northern Central Railway =

- U.S. National Register of Historic Places
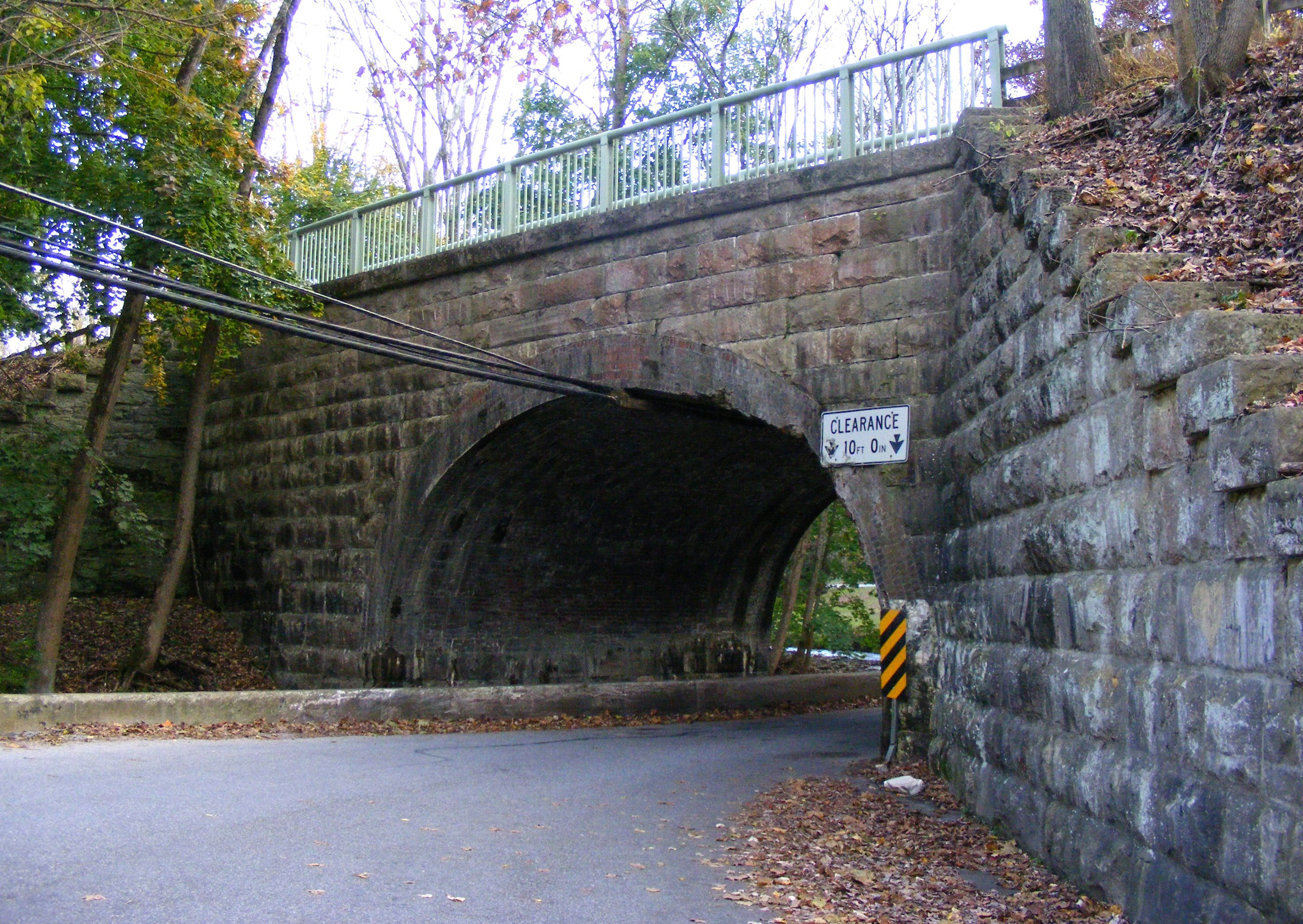
- Southbound PA 616 as it approaches NCRY Bridge 182+42

- Location within Pennsylvania Location within the United States
- Location: Northern Central railroad tracks over Pennsylvania Route 616 and Codorus Creek, south of Glen Rock, Shrewsbury Township, Pennsylvania
- Coordinates: 39°46′39″N 76°43′25″W
- Area: less than one acre
- Built: 1871
- Architectural style: Masonry Arch
- MPS: Railroad Resources of York County MPS
- NRHP reference No.: 95000542
- Added to NRHP: May 4, 1995

Bridge 182+42, Northern Central Railway is a historic stone arch railroad bridge in Shrewsbury Township, York County, Pennsylvania. It was built in 1871, and measures about 80-foot-long (24 m) overall. The limestone and granite bridge was built by the Northern Central Railway and crosses Codorus Creek.

It was added to the National Register of Historic Places in 1995.
