= Stone Arch Road Bridge, Stewartstown Railroad =

- U.S. National Register of Historic Places
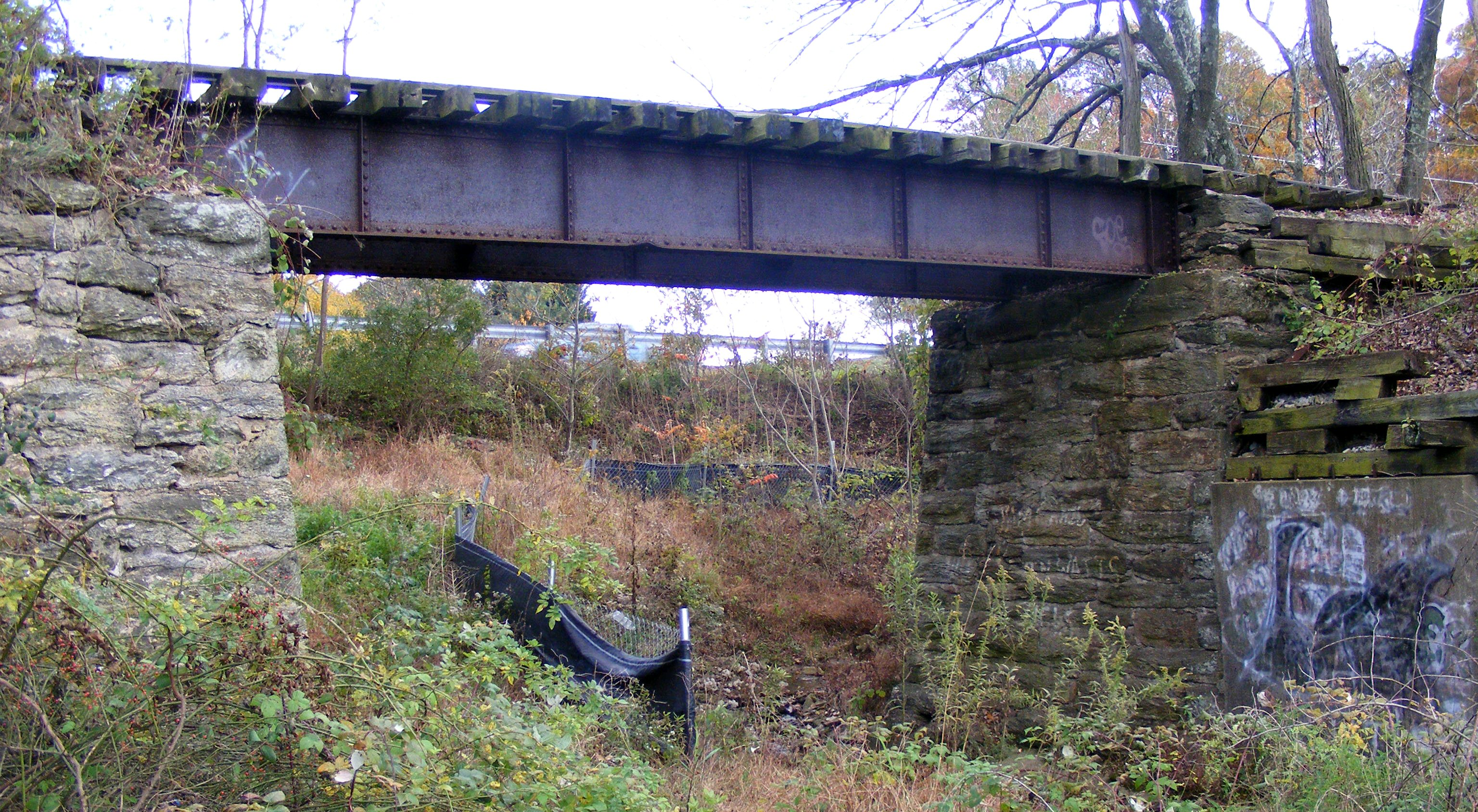

- Location within Pennsylvania Location within the United States
- Location: Stewartstown Railroad tracks over Stone Arch Road, east of Railroad, Shrewsbury Township, Pennsylvania
- Coordinates: 39°45′1″N 76°41′14″W
- Area: less than one acre
- Built: c. 1895
- Architectural style: Girder
- MPS: Railroad Resources of York County MPS
- NRHP reference No.: 95000547
- Added to NRHP: May 4, 1995

Stone Arch Road Bridge, Stewartstown Railroad is a historic railroad bridge in Shrewsbury Township, York County, Pennsylvania. It was built about 1895, and measures 27-foot-6-inch-long (8.38 m) overall. The girder bridge on stone abutments was built by the Stewartstown Railroad.

It was added to the National Register of Historic Places in 1995.
