= Ridge Road Bridge, Stewartstown Railroad =

- U.S. National Register of Historic Places
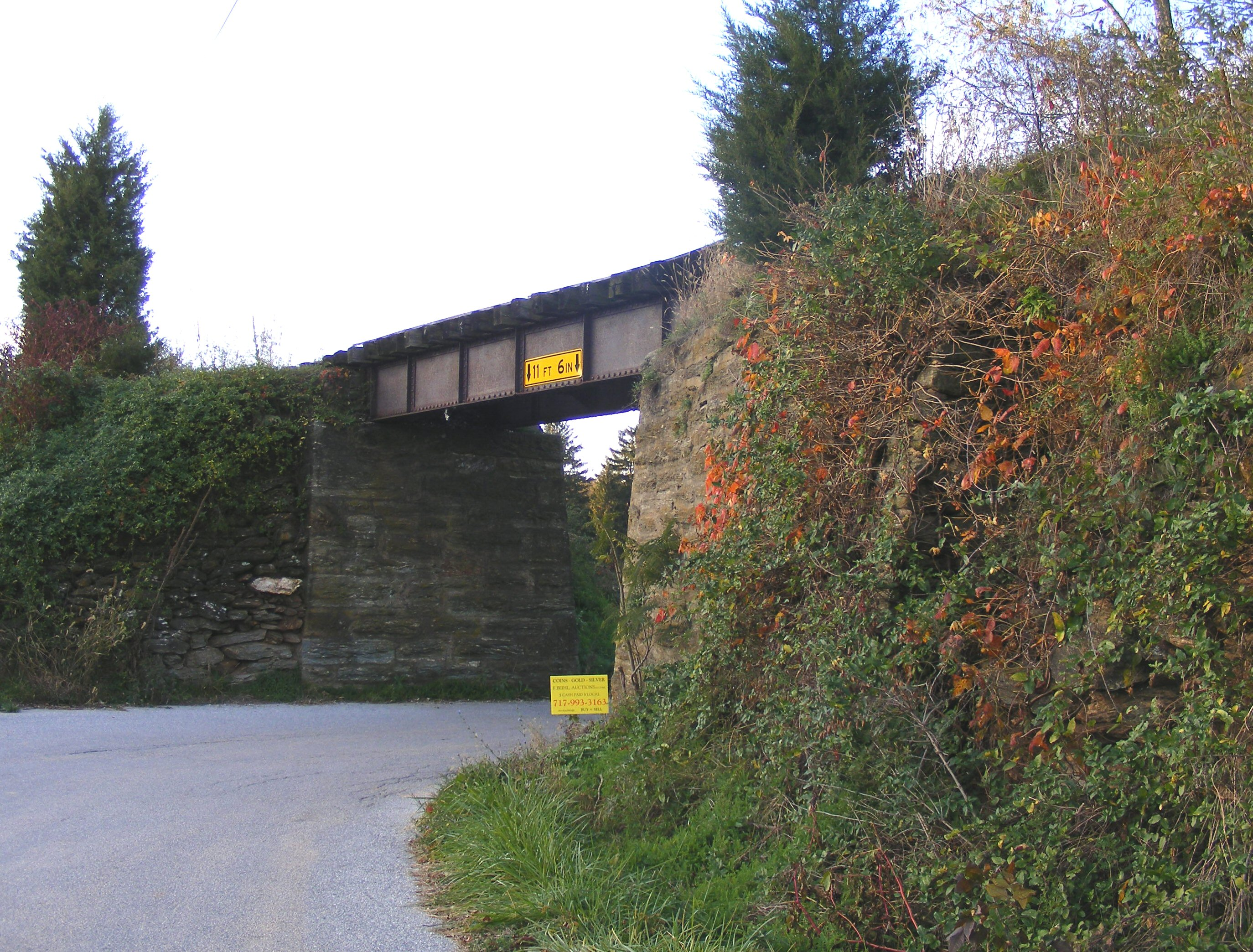

- Location within Pennsylvania Location within the United States
- Location: Stewartstown Railroad tracks over Valley Road, west of Stewartstown, Hopewell Township, Pennsylvania
- Coordinates: 39°45′35″N 76°37′33″W
- Area: less than one acre
- Built: c. 1895
- Architectural style: Girder
- MPS: Railroad Resources of York County MPS
- NRHP reference No.: 95000545
- Added to NRHP: May 4, 1995

Ridge Road Bridge, Stewartstown Railroad is a historic railroad bridge in Hopewell Township, York County, Pennsylvania. It was built sometime around 1895, and measures 72-foot-6-inch-long (22.10 m) and 10-foot-wide (3.0 m) overall. The girder bridge on stone abutments was built by the Stewartstown Railroad.

It was added to the National Register of Historic Places in 1995.
