= Susquehannock High School =

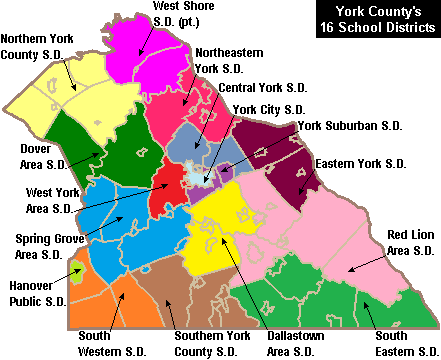

Location
- 3280 Fissels Church Road; Shrewsbury Township, York County, Pennsylvania 17327; United States
- Coordinates: 39.7705°N 76.7347°W

Information
- Type: Public
- Motto: An Absolute Commitment to the Highest Level of Academic Achievement
- Principal: James Sterner
- Faculty: 70 teachers (2013)
- Grades: 9-12
- Enrollment: 919 (2023–2024)
- Language: English
- Campus type: Suburban/Rural
- Mascot: Warriors
- Rival: Kennard-Dale
- Newspaper: The Susquehannock Courier
- Communities served: Shrewsbury, Glen Rock, New Freedom
- Feeder schools: Southern Middle School
- Website: http://www.syc.k12.pa.us/

Susquehannock High School is a mid-sized suburban public high school in Glen Rock, Pennsylvania. It is the sole high school operated by the Southern York County School District. In 2014, enrollment was reported as 946 pupils in 9th through 12th grades. Susquehannock High School employed 70 teachers.

Susquehannock High School students may choose to attend York County School of Technology for training in the construction and mechanical trades. The Lincoln Intermediate Unit IU12 provides the school with a wide variety of services like specialized education for disabled students and hearing, speech and visual disability services and professional development for staff and faculty.

== Extracurriculars ==
The district offers a variety of clubs, activities and an extensive sports program.

=== Sports ===
The district funds:

Boys

- Baseball - AA
- Basketball - AAA
- Cross country - AA
- Football - AAA
- Golf - AAA
- Lacrosse - AAAA
- Soccer - AA
- Swimming and diving - AA
- Tennis - AAA
- Track and field - AAA
- Volleyball - AA
- Wrestling - AAA

Girls

- Basketball - AAA
- Cross country - AAA
- Field hockey - AA
- Lacrosse - AAAA
- Soccer - AA
- Softball - AAA
- Swimming and diving - AA
- Tennis - AAA
- Track and field - AAA
- Volleyball - AA

According to PIAA directory July 2014

== Notable alumni ==
- Ron Wolf (class of 1956), Former GM of the Green Bay Packers, inducted into the Pro Football Hall of Fame in 2015
- Randy Edsall (class of 1976), Former college football coach for the University of Connecticut and University of Maryland
- Ronnie McCoury (class of 1985), bluegrass musician
- Rob McCoury (class of 1989), bluegrass musician
- Summer Britcher (class of 2012), 3x Olympic Luger
- Bailey Ryon (class of 2020), Broadway actress and Tony Honors winner
