= Cliff Heathcote =

American baseball player (1898–1939)

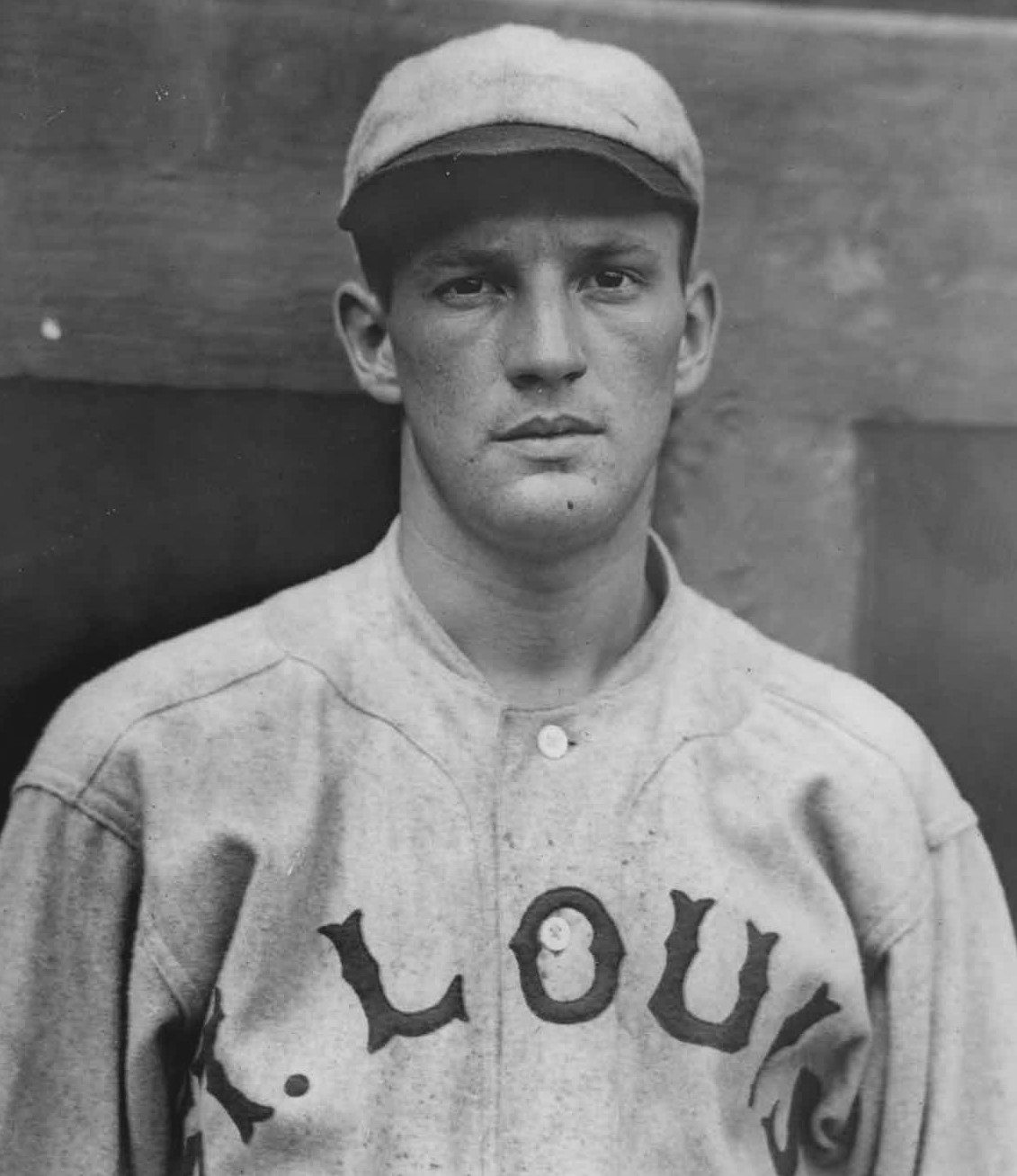
- Outfielder
- Born: January 24, 1898; Glen Rock, Pennsylvania, U.S.
- Died: January 18, 1939 (aged 40); York, Pennsylvania, U.S.
- Batted: Left Threw: Left

MLB debut
- June 4, 1918, for the St. Louis Cardinals

Last MLB appearance
- September 24, 1932, for the Philadelphia Phillies

MLB statistics
- Batting average: .275
- Home runs: 42
- Runs batted in: 448
- Stats at Baseball Reference

Teams
- St. Louis Cardinals (1918–1922); Chicago Cubs (1922–1930); Cincinnati Reds (1931–1932); Philadelphia Phillies (1932)

Clifton Earl Heathcote (January 24, 1898 – January 18, 1939) was an American center fielder in Major League Baseball who played for the St. Louis Cardinals (1918–1922), Chicago Cubs (1922–1930), Cincinnati Reds (1931–1932), and Philadelphia Phillies (1932).

== Biography ==
Heathcote batted and threw left-handed; in a 15-season career, Heathcote posted a .275 batting average with 42 home runs, 448 RBI, and 191 stolen bases in 1415 games played. He was born in Glen Rock, Pennsylvania, and died in York, Pennsylvania, at the age of 40 from a pulmonary embolism.

== Highlights ==
- Hit for the cycle on June 13, 1918, in only his sixth career game (the quickest player to do it in MLB history).
- On May 30, 1922, the Cardinals were playing a Memorial Day doubleheader at Cubs Park. Between games, Heathcote was traded for Max Flack. Both men appeared in both games that day.
- On August 25, 1922, when the Cubs and the Philadelphia Phillies played to a 26–23 Cubs win, Heathcote set a modern National League record by reaching base seven times in a nine-inning game, and set the record (which has since been surpassed) for most runs scored in a single major league game. He went 5-for-5 (3 singles, 2 doubles) that day, also walking twice, while driving in four runs and scoring five.
- 1926: 10 HR, 98 runs, 141 hits, and 33 doubles in 139 games – all career-highs.

== See also ==
- List of Major League Baseball career stolen bases leaders
- List of Major League Baseball players to hit for the cycle

Achievements
Preceded by Heinie Groh	Hitting for the cycle June 13, 1918	Succeeded by George Sisler
