= Bridge 634, Northern Central Railway =

- U.S. National Register of Historic Places
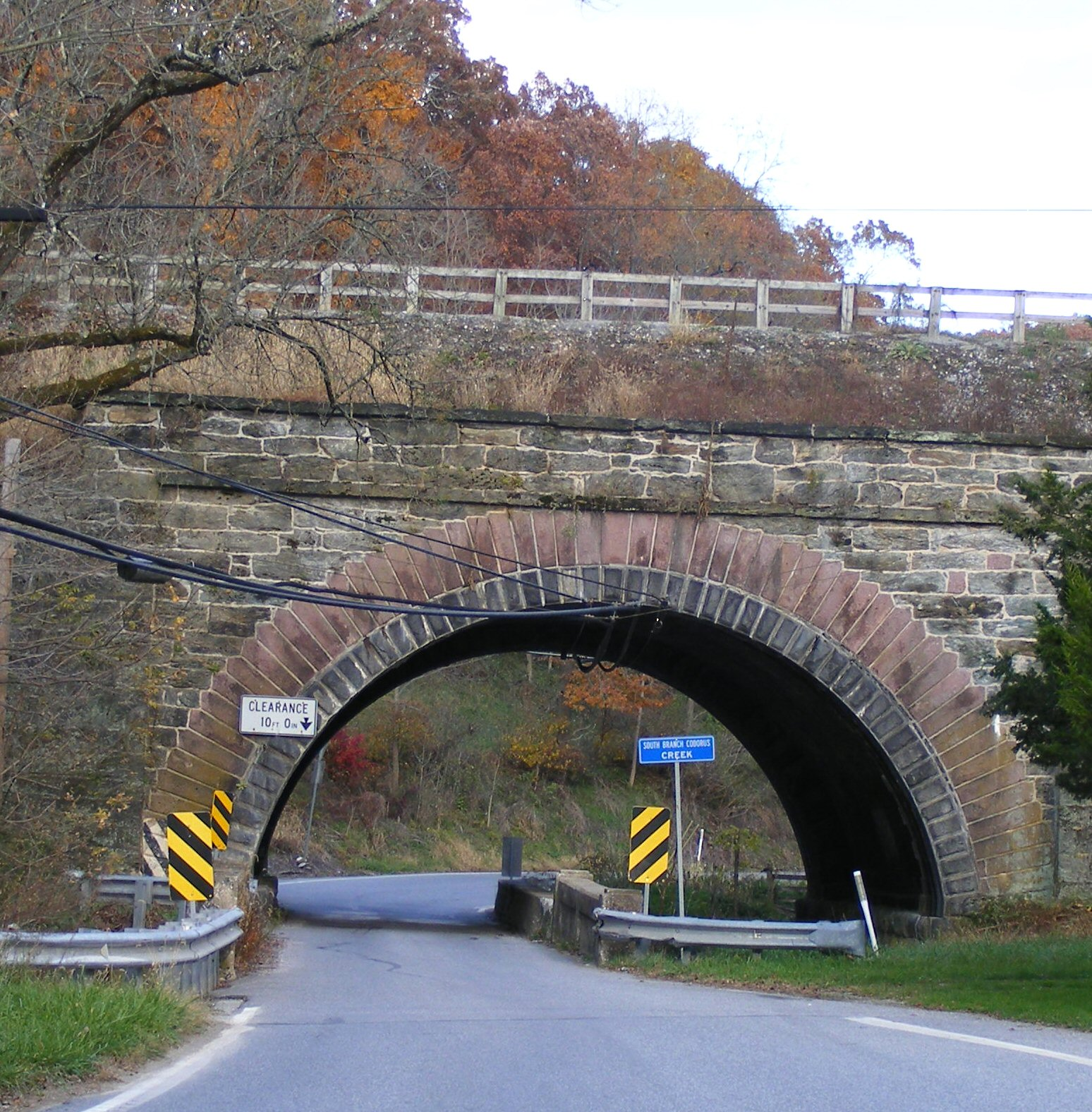
- Southbound PA 616 as it approaches NCRY Bridge 634, just before another one over Codorus Creek.

- Location within Pennsylvania Location within the United States
- Location: Northern Central Railroad tracks over an unnamed road and Codorus Creek, northwest of Railroad, Shrewsbury Township, Pennsylvania
- Coordinates: 39°46′23″N 76°43′14″W
- Area: less than one acre
- Built: 1871
- Architectural style: Masonry Arch
- MPS: Railroad Resources of York County MPS
- NRHP reference No.: 95000543
- Added to NRHP: May 4, 1995

Bridge 634, Northern Central Railway is a historic stone arch railroad bridge in Shrewsbury Township, York County, Pennsylvania. It was built in 1871, and measures about 80-foot-long (24 m) overall. The brown limestone and brick bridge was built by the Northern Central Railway and crosses a roadway and Codorus Creek.

It was added to the National Register of Historic Places in 1995.
