= Fissel's School =

- U.S. National Register of Historic Places
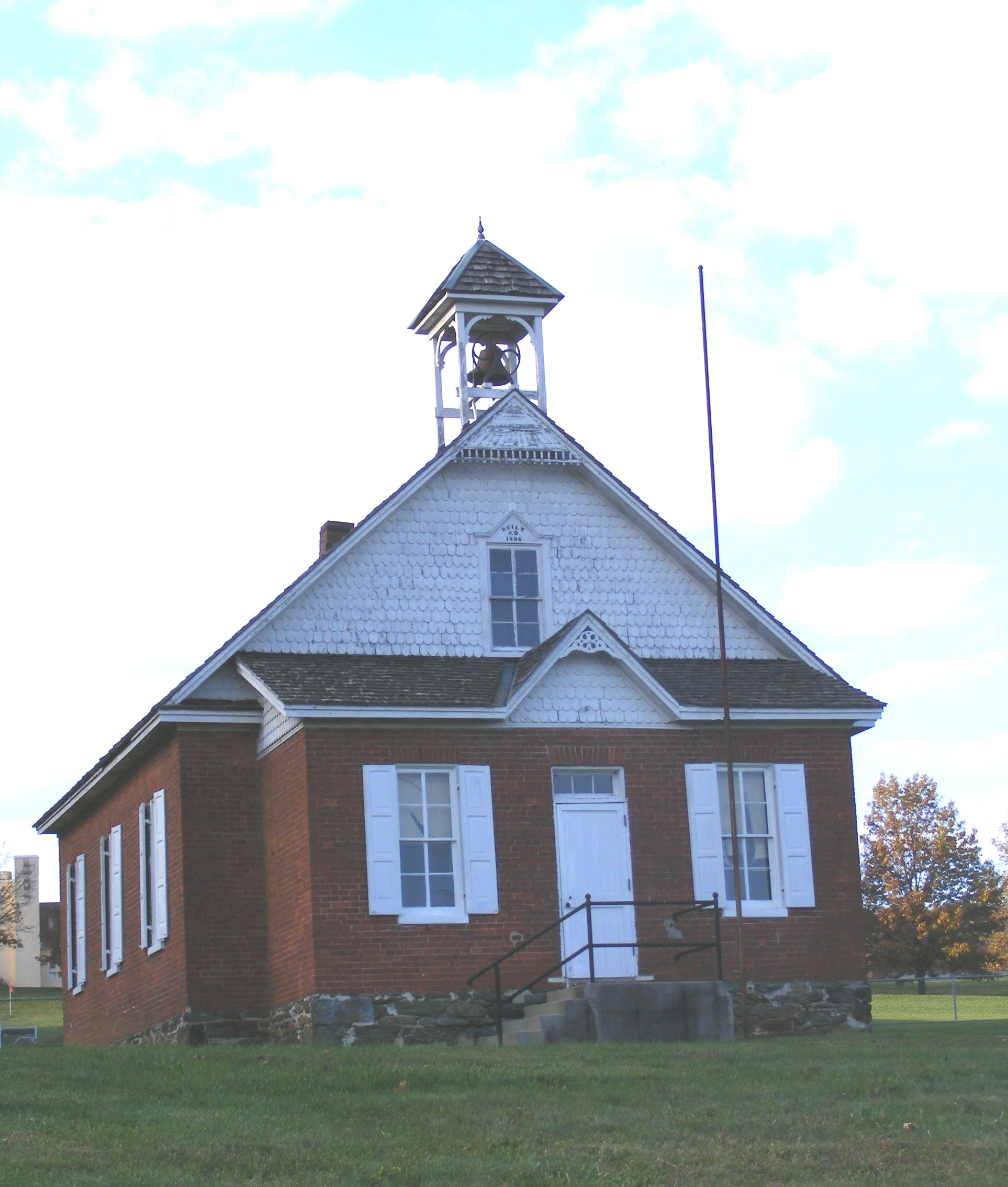
- Fissel's School, October 2012

- Location within Pennsylvania Location within the United States
- Location: Jct. of Fissel's Church Rd, and Country Club Rd., Shrewsbury Township, Pennsylvania
- Coordinates: 39°46′06″N 76°44′01″W
- Area: less than one acre
- Built: 1896
- Architectural style: Queen Anne
- NRHP reference No.: 97001253
- Added to NRHP: October 24, 1997

Fissel's School is a historic one-room school building located at Shrewsbury Township, York County, Pennsylvania. It was built in 1896, and is a 1 1/2-story, brick building with Queen Anne stylistic elements. It measures 28 feet, 6 inches, wide and 30 feet, 4 inches, deep with a 22 foot wide, 7 foot deep entrance portico. It has a gable roof with decorative bargeboard and fishscale shingles. Atop the roof above the entrance is a belfry. It ceased use as a school about 1946.

It was added to the National Register of Historic Places in 1997.
