= Valley Road Bridge, Stewartstown Railroad =

- U.S. National Register of Historic Places
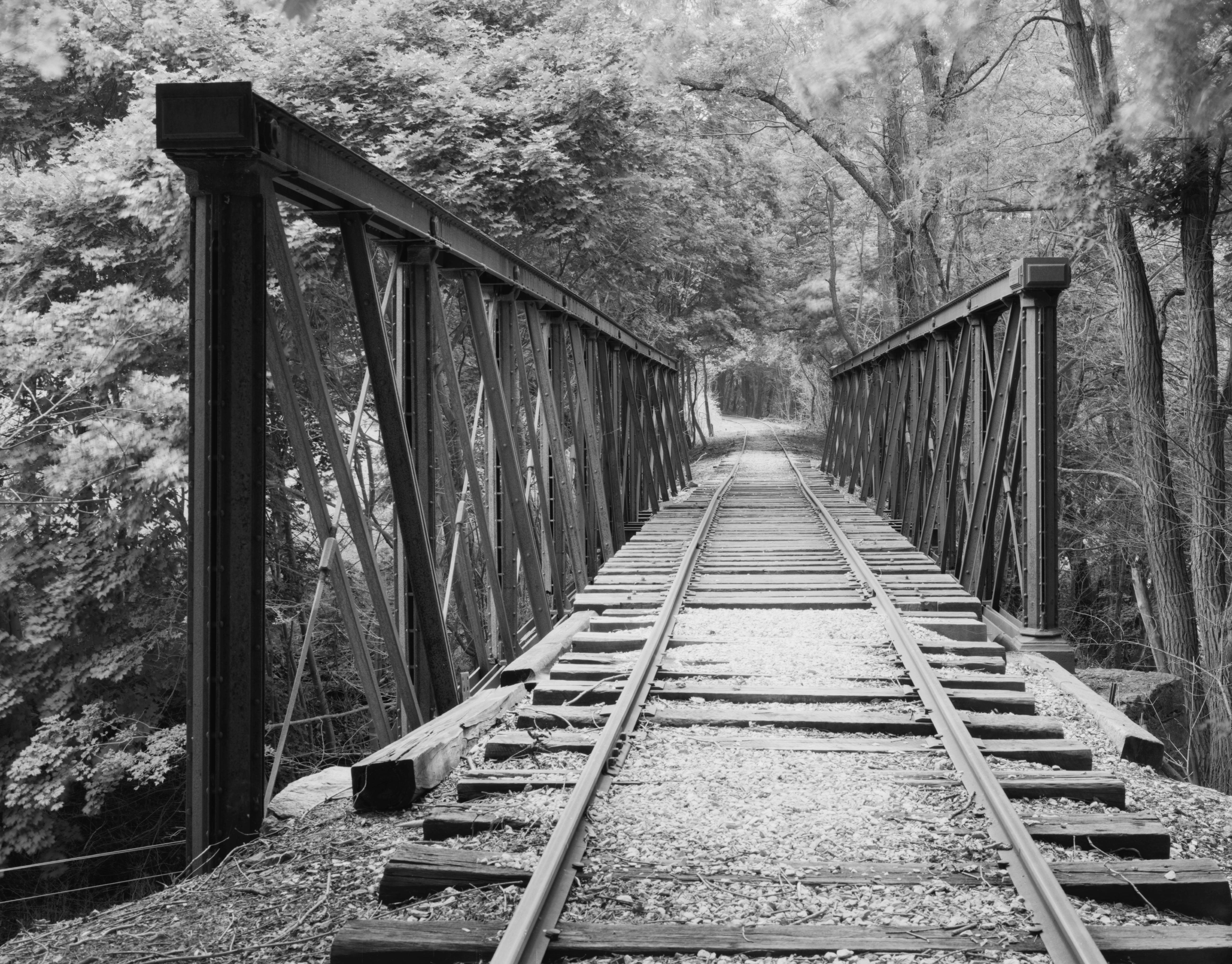
- Valley Road Bridge, Summer 1991

- Location within Pennsylvania Location within the United States
- Location: Stewartstown Railroad tracks over Valley Road, west of Stewartstown, Hopewell Township, Pennsylvania
- Coordinates: 39°45′19″N 76°36′34″W
- Area: less than one acre
- Built: 1870, Rebuilt 1920
- Architect: Keystone Bridge Co.
- Architectural style: Pratt Truss
- MPS: Railroad Resources of York County MPS
- NRHP reference No.: 95000552
- Added to NRHP: May 4, 1995

The Valley Road Bridge, Stewartstown Railroad is an historic railroad bridge in Hopewell Township, York County, Pennsylvania, United States.

It was added to the National Register of Historic Places in 1995.

== History and architectural features ==
Built for the Northern Central Railroad in 1870, this 190-foot-long bridge was disassembled and reassembled on the Stewartstown Railroad in 1885. A girder structure was added in 1920, and the original bridge structure was removed, although the original 1870 trusses are still in place. The bridge is still in active use, and services the Stewartstown Railroad passenger excursions.

== See also ==
- List of bridges documented by the Historic American Engineering Record in Pennsylvania
