= Shrewsbury Historic District (Shrewsbury, Pennsylvania) =

Historic district in Pennsylvania, United States

- U.S. National Register of Historic Places
- U.S. Historic district
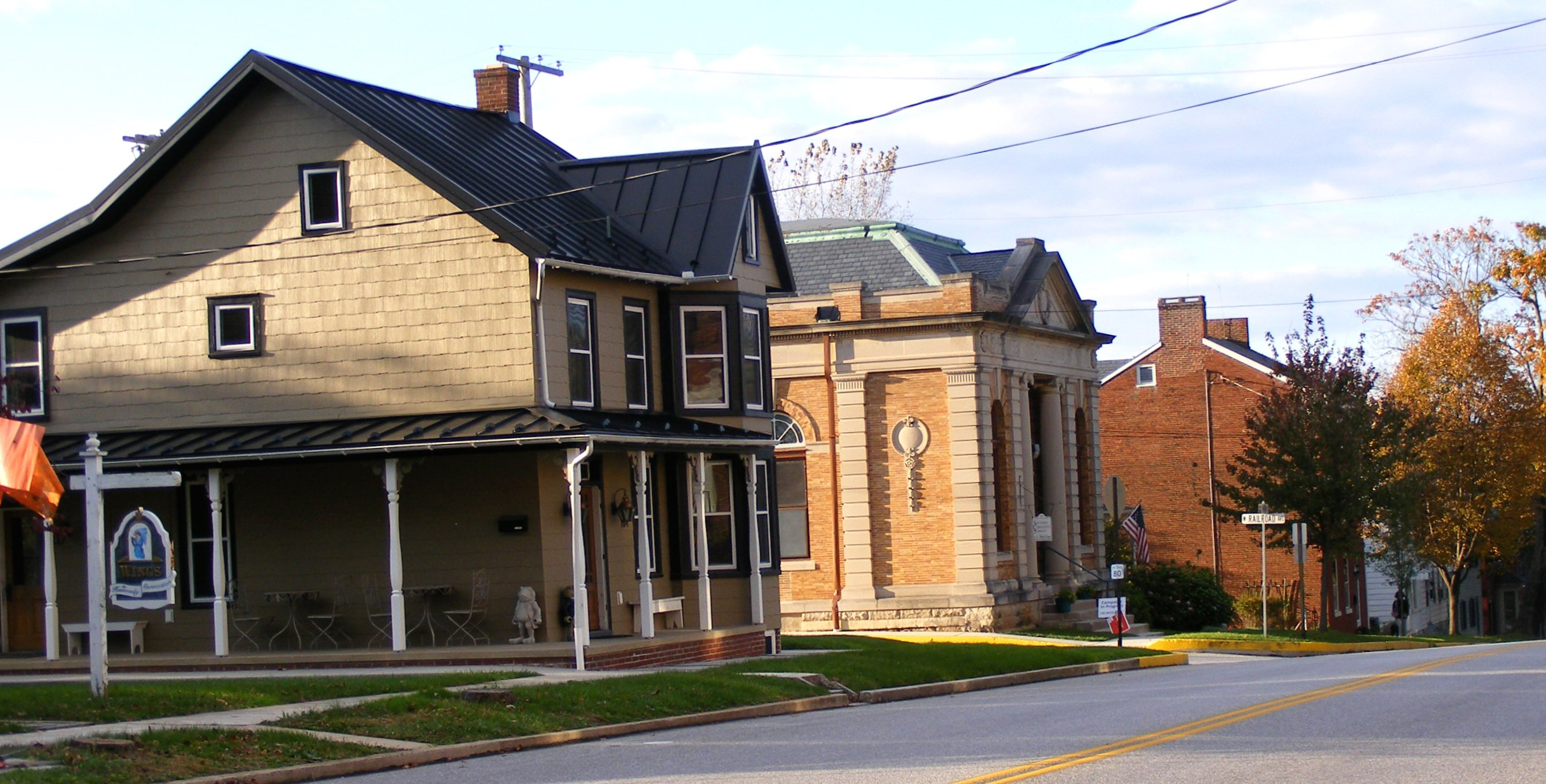
- Shrewsbury Historic District, view along Main Street, October 2012

- Location within Pennsylvania Location within the United States
- Location: Roughly bounded by Highland, Sunset Drs., Park Ave., Church, and Pine Sts., Shrewsbury, Pennsylvania
- Coordinates: 39°46′03″N 76°40′49″W
- Area: 56.7 acres (22.9 ha)
- Built: c. 1800
- Architectural style: Greek Revival, Other, Federal, Italianate
- NRHP reference No.: 84003605
- Added to NRHP: March 22, 1984

Shrewsbury Historic District is a national historic district located at Shrewsbury, Pennsylvania in York County, Pennsylvania. The district includes 152 contributing buildings in the central business district and surround residential areas of Shrewsbury. A few of the buildings are log dwelling built before 1800. Notable non-residential buildings include the Odd Fellows Hall (1853) and two Romanesque Revival churches.

It was listed on the National Register of Historic Places in 1984.
