= Glen Rock Historic District =

Historic district in Pennsylvania, United States

- U.S. National Register of Historic Places
- U.S. Historic district
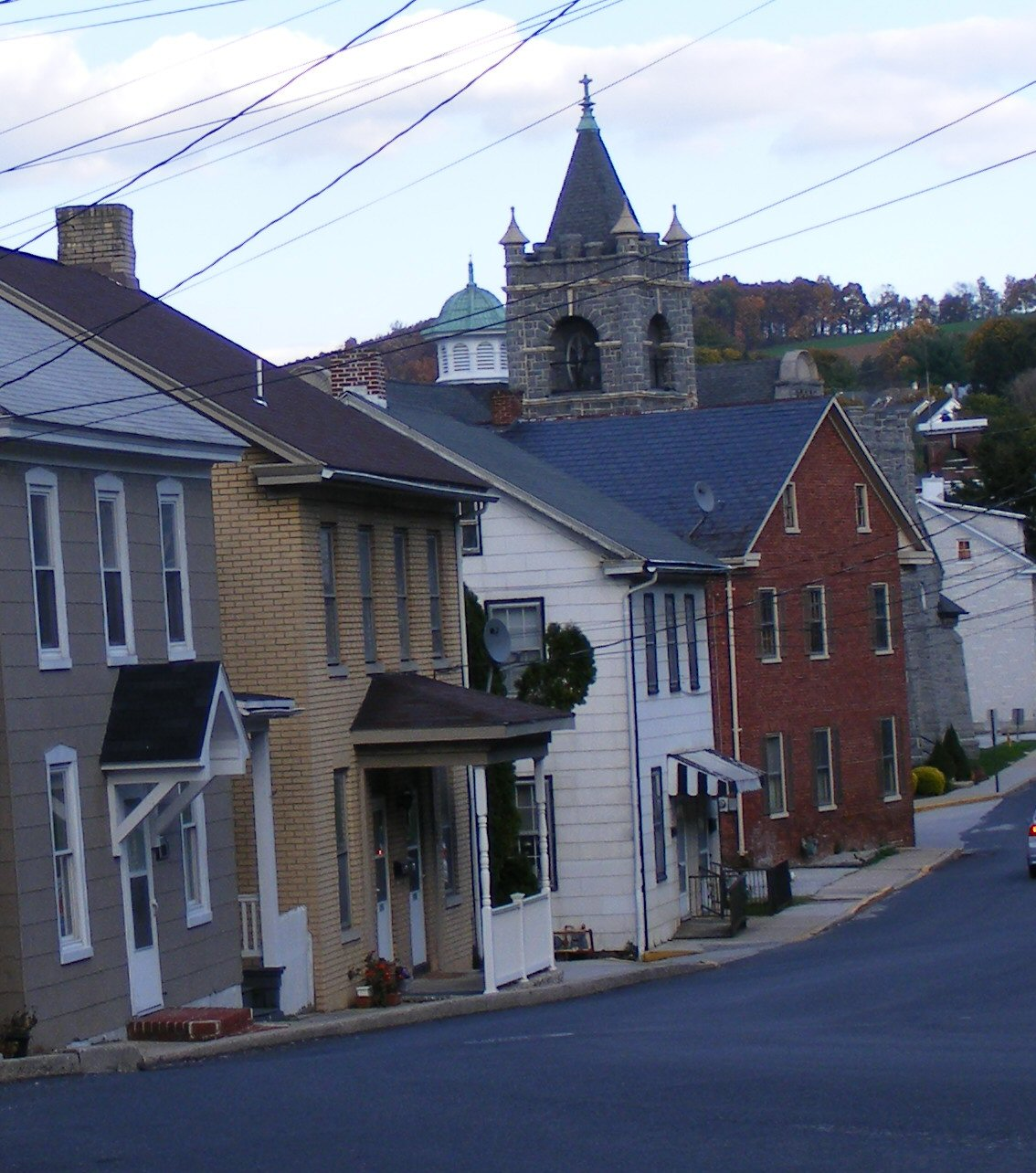
- Glen Rock PA Historic District, view along Hanover Street, October 2012

- Location within Pennsylvania Location within the United States
- Location: Roughly bounded by Glenvue Rd., Hanover, Manchester, Valley, Church and Center Sts., Shrewsbury Township, Glen Rock, Pennsylvania
- Coordinates: 39°47′34″N 76°43′58″W
- Area: 110 acres (45 ha)
- Built: 1838
- Architect: Dise, Joseph; Shewell, Jesse
- Architectural style: Queen Anne, Bungalow/craftsman
- NRHP reference No.: 97000518
- Added to NRHP: May 30, 1997

The Glen Rock Historic District is a national historic district which is located in Glen Rock in York County, Pennsylvania.

It was listed on the National Register of Historic Places in 1997.

== History and architectural features ==
This district includes two hundred and eighty-seven contributing buildings, one contributing site, and four contributing structures, which were erected in the central business district and surrounding residential area of Glen Rock. The houses are mostly two-and-one-half-story, vernacular, wood-frame buildings that were built between 1838 and 1945, with some notable Queen Anne and Bungalow/craftsman-style dwellings.

Notable buildings include the Philip Shaffer House, which was erected sometime around 1840, the "Castle," which was built in 1889, the Peoples Bank of Glen Rock, which was erected in 1912, the Glen Theatre, which was built in 1913, the Glen Rock Hose and Ladder Company, which was erected in 1904, the Zion Evangelical Lutheran Church, which was built in 1905, the Immanuel United Methodist Church, which was built in 1926, the Industrial Sewing Company, which was erected in 1916, the Glen Traditionals building, which was built in 1921, and the Accufab building, which was erected sometime around 1938.

The contributing structure is the Northern Central Railway bridge, which was erected circa 1871.

This district was listed on the National Register of Historic Places in 1997.
