= Shrewsbury station (Pennsylvania) =

- Shrewsbury Railroad Station, Stewartstown Railroad
- U.S. National Register of Historic Places
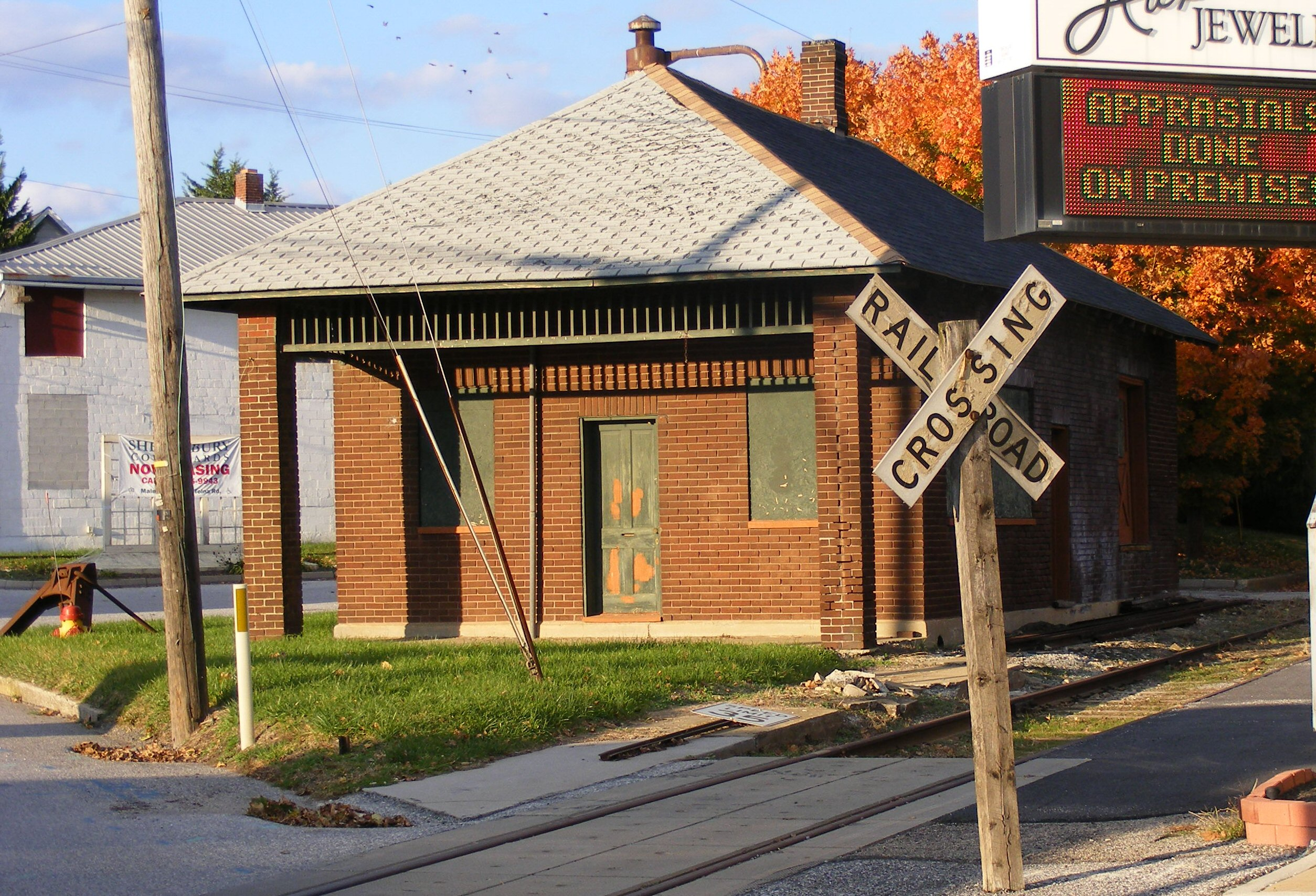

- Location within Pennsylvania Location within the United States
- Location: S. Main St. at Stewartstown RR tracks, Shrewsbury, Pennsylvania
- Coordinates: 39°45′26″N 76°40′41″W
- Area: less than one acre
- Built: c. 1910
- Architectural style: Late 19th And Early 20th Century American Movements
- MPS: Railroad Resources of York County MPS
- NRHP reference No.: 95000546
- Added to NRHP: May 4, 1995

Shrewsbury Railroad Station, Stewartstown Railroad is a historic railroad station located at Shrewsbury, York County, Pennsylvania. It was built in c. 1910, and is a one-story, three bay by four bay brick building built by the Stewartstown Railroad. It has a hipped roof that extends over a porch. It was used as both a freight and passenger station. It is currently being renovated by the railroad for eventual use for excursion service.

It was added to the National Register of Historic Places in 1995.
