= Stewartstown station =

- Stewartstown Railroad Station
- U.S. National Register of Historic Places
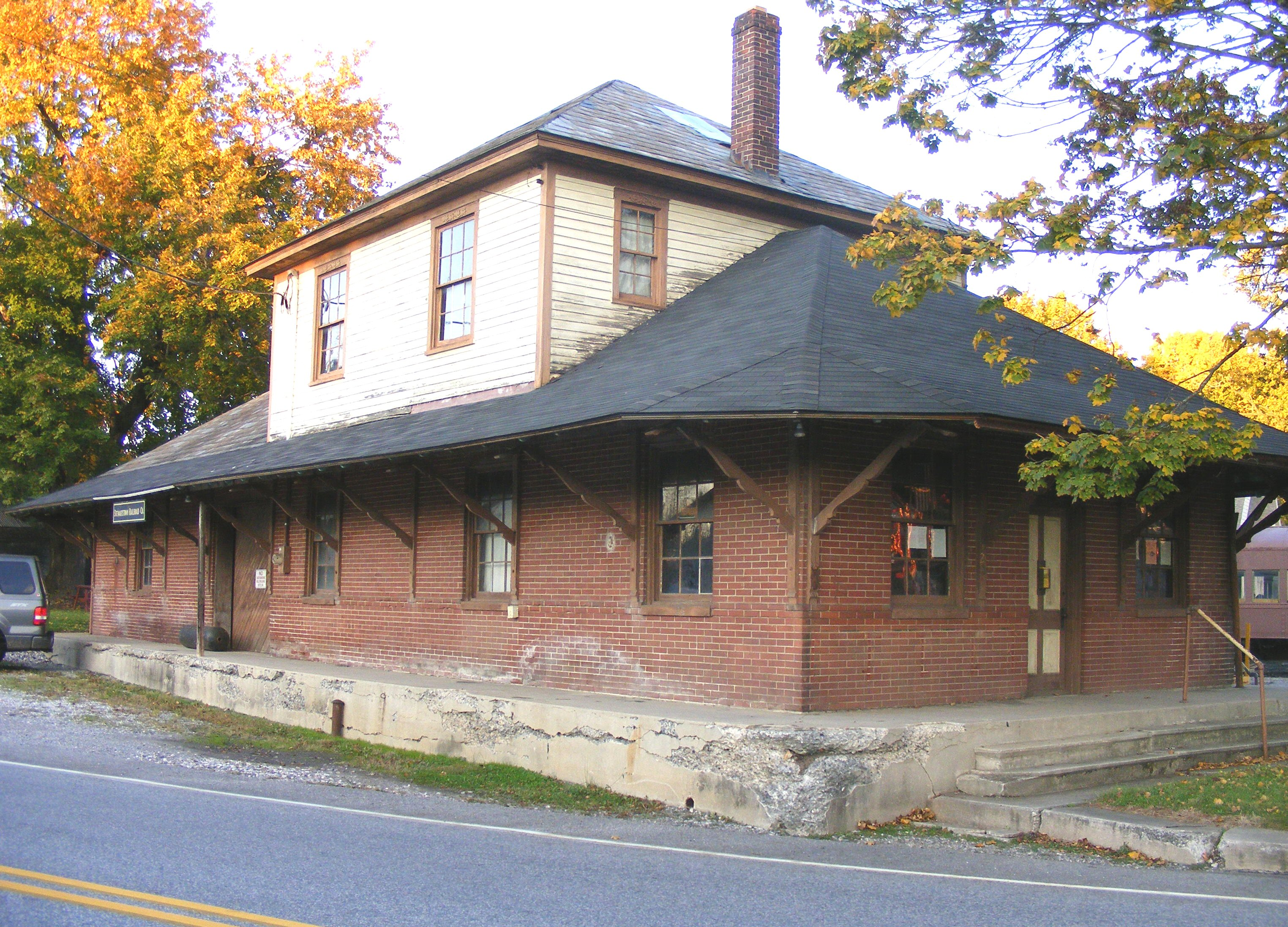

- Location within Pennsylvania Location within the United States
- Location: Jct. of W. Pennsylvania Ave. and Hill St., Stewartstown, Pennsylvania
- Coordinates: 39°45′15″N 76°35′43″W
- Area: less than one acre
- Built: 1914
- Architectural style: Late Victorian
- MPS: Railroad Resources of York County MPS
- NRHP reference No.: 95000553
- Added to NRHP: May 18, 1995

The Stewartstown Railroad Station is an historic railroad station in Stewartstown, York County, Pennsylvania, United States.

It was added to the National Register of Historic Places in 1995.

== History and architectural features ==
This 1 1/2-story, three-bay by five-bay, brick building was built by the Stewartstown Railroad in 1914 and has a slate covered hipped roof. It was used as both a freight and passenger station. It was the second station in Stewartstown, as the original 1884 station was taken out of service so the New Park & Fawn Grove Railroad, which interchanged with and was later operated by the Stewartstown, could be serviced easier. It was once the departing location for the now abandoned railroad's passenger excursion trains.

In 2018, the original slate roof was replaced with a new metal roof, after a tree planted at the station's opening dropped limbs on the roof, causing damage.
