= Stewartstown Engine House, Stewartstown Railroad =

- U.S. National Register of Historic Places
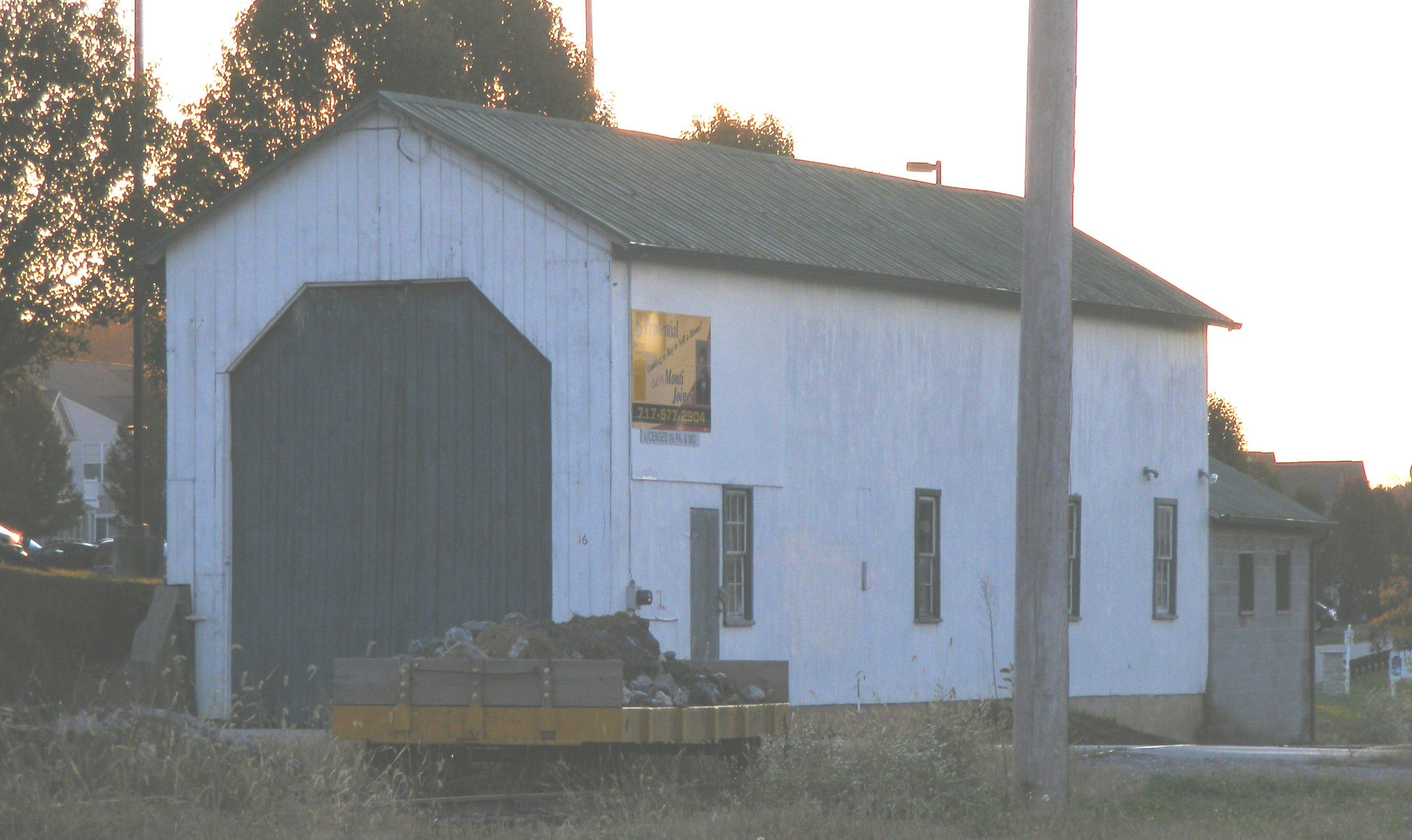

- Location within Pennsylvania Location within the United States
- Location: N. Hill St., Stewartstown, Pennsylvania
- Coordinates: 39°45′16″N 76°35′47″W
- Area: less than one acre
- Built: c. 1884
- MPS: Railroad Resources of York County MPS
- NRHP reference No.: 95000554
- Added to NRHP: May 4, 1995

Stewartstown Engine House, Stewartstown Railroad is a historic railroad engine house located at Stewartstown, York County, Pennsylvania. It was built about 1884, and is a simple weatherboard building with a metal covered gable roof built by the Stewartstown Railroad. It has two large bay doors on the front facade and a cement block addition.

It was added to the National Register of Historic Places in 1995.
