= Stewartstown Railroad =

Heritage railroad in the United States

Overview
- Headquarters: Stewartstown
- Locale: Stewartstown, Pennsylvania, US
- Dates of operation: Charted 09/22/1884 opened 1885–present

Technical
- Track gauge: 4' 8 1/2"
- Length: 7.4 miles

Other
- Website: stewartstownrailroadco.com

The Stewartstown Railroad is a heritage railroad in Stewartstown, Pennsylvania. Chartered in 1884 by local interests in the Stewartstown area and opened in 1885, the Stewartstown Railroad survives today in very much original condition and retains its original corporate charter.

== History ==
The railroad was organized by a group of local citizens in 1884 to connect Stewartstown and its agricultural base with the Northern Central Railway's Harrisburg–Baltimore route at nearby New Freedom. The 7.4-mile-long (11.9 km) route posed many obstacles, including steep grades and sharp curves, and took nearly a year to complete, opening in 1885. In the early years, there were six trains each day, carrying passengers and agricultural products.

The New Park & Fawn Grove Railroad opened in 1906, running for 9.2 mi (14.8 km) between Fawn Grove and the eastern terminus of the Stewartstown Railroad in Stewartstown. Efforts in 1906, 1909, and 1924 to extend the New Park & Fawn Grove from Fawn Grove to slate and marble quarries in Delta were never realized. The Stewartstown Railroad took over the New Park & Fawn Grove in 1923 and operated it until 1935.

The years of the Great Depression took their toll on the Stewartstown Railroad Company and revenues dropped sharply. The end of the steam locomotive era marked the introduction of a gasoline powered combination car that provided both passenger and express service. Passenger ridership plummeted from the mid-1920s onward and officially ceased in 1952.

The railroad closed in 1972 after Hurricane Agnes destroyed parts of the former Northern Central line between Harrisburg and Baltimore, severing the Stewartstown's link with the national rail network. The Stewartstown remained closed until 1985, when the former Northern Central line reopened between New Freedom and York. (Track from New Freedom south to Baltimore was never repaired and was eventually removed.) During this time, the Stewartstown ran excursion trips and occasional freight service, connecting at York with what was then Conrail and the Maryland & Pennsylvania Railroad.

== Present day ==
The Stewartstown later ran as a heritage railroad but ceased operating again in 2004. Until then, former president and shareholder George M. Hart had advanced the railroad with his funds to keep it afloat. After Hart died in 2008, his will stipulated that his executors should collect the debt, over $350,000, owed to his estate. While the railroad agreed that his contributions were loans, they also believed the debt would be forgiven after his death. The Bucks County Historical Society, a beneficiary of Hart's estate, demanded immediate payment while the railroad proposed a five-year repayment plan.

In July 2011, the estate filed an Adverse Abandonment application with the Surface Transportation Board, which was granted in November 2012. This allowed the estate to start foreclosue proceedings on the railroad and sell its assets. Eventually donors came forward to pay off the debt in 2013.

In 2006, when the railroad had been dormant for two years, a Friends group organized to help restore service. By 2008, the Stewartstown station was reopened for visitors and limited excursion service was restored later that year. The rail line's reactivation was not without some opposition: the local newspaper applauded preservation of the historic buildings but argued that conversion to a rail trail would be more cost-effective and draw more users. By 2015, the railroad had a crew of volunteers working on operations.

Currently, passenger and tourist trains operate out of the 1914 Stewartstown Railroad Station, for either Coach rides or Caboose rides, approximately two miles down the line and back. Former Reading Railroad coach 1341 was returned to service in December 2016 and in June 2018 a new open air car owned and built by the Friends of the Stewartstown Railroad, Inc. was available. In January 2021, it acquired a former Missouri-Kansas-Texas Railroad maintenance car that it was adapting for handicap access.

Motorcar rides operate out of the Stewartstown Railroad Station and run the entire length of the 7.4-mile line. Approximately one weekend a month motorcar trains run from Stewartstown to New Freedom, and return.

The Railroad offers holiday specific trains, such as Easter Bunny Trains, Fall Foliage Runs, Halloween Trains, and Santa Trains.

The Shrewsbury Railroad Station, Stewartstown Railroad Station, and Stewartstown Engine House at Stewartstown are listed on the National Register of Historic Places in York County, Pennsylvania. Also listed are the Deer Creek Bridge, Ridge Road Bridge, Stone Arch Road Bridge, and Valley Road Bridge.

== Equipment ==
=== Current Locomotives ===
Number	Builder	Type	Build date	Status	Notes	Image
6	Plymouth Locomotive Works	ML-6	1939	Private Restoration	Built new in 1939 by the Plymouth Locomotive Works for the Stewartstown Railroad, was sold 9/1972 to Wolfeboro Railroad, then to a number of equipment and scrap dealers. In 1993 it was on display in North Hampton, New Hampshire. In June 2022 it was purchased by a volunteer with the present-day railroad and brought back to York County, PA, pending a restoration. Dubbed "Little Mo"	Stewartstown Railroad #6 "Little Mo" undergoing private restoration
9	Plymouth Locomotive Works	ML-8 switcher	1943	Operational	Built in 1943 by the Plymouth Locomotive Works in Plymouth, Ohio, it originally served on the South Carolina Ports Authority until 1960 when it was purchased by the Stewartstown Railroad. Today, the engine serves as the motive power for regular passenger and caboose trains. Dubbed "Mighty Mo"	STRT 9 "Mighty Mo" at the Stewartstown Station
10	GE Transportation	44-ton switcher	1946	Operational	Built in 1946 by GE Transportation, an ex-Coudersport & Port Allegany and Wellsville, Addison & Galeton Railroad locomotive. In 1972, it was leased by the Lykens Valley Railroad where it served on the railway from 1972 to 1983. It was later operated by Rail Tours, Incorporated in Jim Thorpe, Pennsylvania from 1983 until 1985 when it was returned to the Stewartstown Railroad. The locomotive returned to active service in April 2019	STRT 10 in the siding at Stewartstown Station
12	GE Transportation	80-ton switcher	1953	Stored serviceable	Built in 1953 for the US Navy as a munitions base switcher. Later used by an Indiana-based metal recycler. Delivered to Stewartstown in 2015.	STRT 12 GE 80-tonner locomotive in the siding at Stewartstown Station
13	Plymouth Locomotive Works	DLH 10-Ton Switcher	1939	Private Restoration	Built new for Chris-Craft Boats for use in their Holland, MI factory. Undergoing restoration in the yard at Stewartstown. Dubbed "Mini-Mo"	Stewartstown Railroad #13 "Mini-Mo" undergoing restoration in the Stewartstown yard
84	EMD	SW9	1952	Undergoing Restoration	Built 1952 for the Pittsburgh & Lake Erie Railroad. Purchased by the Maryland & Pennsylvania in 1976. Donated by the York Railway in 2018. Currently stored in New Freedom, PA and undergoing operational restoration.	

=== Former Locomotives ===
Number	Builder	Type	Build date	Notes
1	Baldwin Locomotive Works	4-4-0	1885	Named "Hopewell", sold 1905 to Sabine Tram Co.
2	Baldwin Locomotive Works	4-4-0	1904	
3	Pennsylvania Railroad	D-8a (4-4-0)	1888	Purchased used from the PRR in 1905 or 1906, sold to New Park & Fawn Grove in 1906, scrapped 1921
3	Pennsylvania Railroad	D-8a (4-4-0)	1888	Purchased used from the PRR in 1907, sold 1913
4	Baldwin Locomotive Works	2-6-0	1913	Rebuilt following wreck in 1923, scrapped 1940s
5	Baldwin Locomotive Works	2-6-0	1914	Acquired via New Park & Fawn Grove merger in 1923, scrapped 1940s
7	Brill-White	Model 43 Gas Motorcar	1923	Nicknamed "Snookie", frame scrapped during WWII & body used as temporary housing for workers
8	Plymouth Locomotive Works	ML-8 Switcher	1942	Purchased used from the US Army in 1946, out of service 1960. Used for parts for #9
11	Electro-Motive Corporation	EMC SW	1937	Purchased used from the Maryland and Pennsylvania Railroad in 1986. Now Allentown & Auburn #206.

=== Current Passenger Equipment ===
Number	Former Owner	Build date	Notes	Image
Open-Air Car	Pennsylvania Railroad	1931, 2018	In service, constructed from an F30A flat car donated by Norfolk Southern	Stewartstown Railroad open air car at the Reimold picnic grove
1158	Reading Company	1925	Restored & returned to excursion service in spring 2025	Stewartstown Railroad Coach 1158 at the Reimold picnic grove
1341	Reading Company	1922	In service	Stewartstown Railroad coach 1341 in the yard at Stewartstown
783	Reading Company	1925	Stored, awaiting restoration	
1303	Reading Company	1930	Stored, awaiting restoration	

=== Former Passenger Equipment ===
Number	Type	Build/Purchase Date	Notes
1	Combine car	Built 1885	Out of service by 1919
3	Combine car	Purchased 1906	Ex-PRR, out of service by 1918
4	Combine car	Built 1908	
5	Combine car	Purchased 1914	Ex-PRR
113	Coach	Purchased 1916	

Cars 4, 5, and 113 were all retired from regular service by 1923, when motorcar #7 was purchased. None of the original wooden passenger cars are known to have survived to the current day.
