= Stewartstown, Pennsylvania =

Borough in Pennsylvania, US

- Borough
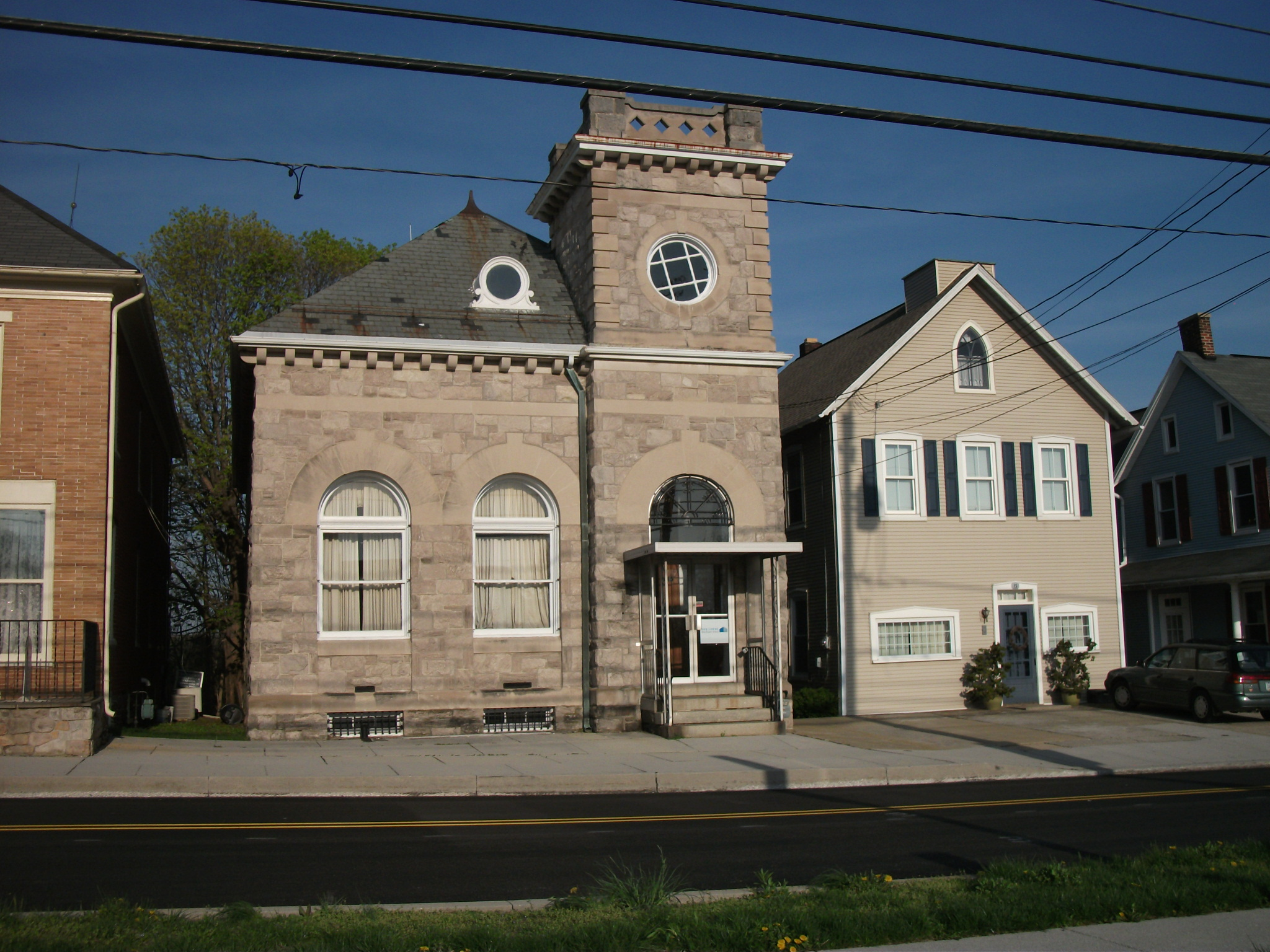

- Location in York County and the U.S. state of Pennsylvania.

- Location of Stewartstown in Pennsylvania Stewartstown (the United States)
- Coordinates: 39°45′15″N 76°35′35″W
- Country: United States
- State: Pennsylvania
- County: York
- Founded: 1767

Area
  - Total: 0.84 sq mi (2.18 km^{2})
  - Land: 0.84 sq mi (2.18 km^{2})
  - Water: 0.27 sq mi (0.69 km^{2})
- Elevation: 870 ft (265.2 m)

Population (2020)
  - Total: 2,129
  - Density: 2,525.4/sq mi (975.06/km^{2})
- Time zone: UTC-5 (Eastern (EST))
  - Summer (DST): UTC-4 (EDT)
- ZIP codes: 17363
- FIPS code: 42-74104
- Website: www.stewartstown.org

Stewartstown is a borough in York County, Pennsylvania, United States. The population was 2,125 at the time of the 2020 census. It is part of the York–Hanover metropolitan area.

== History ==
There were settlers in the Stewartstown area as early as 1750. This part of southern York County was claimed by both Maryland and Pennsylvania, and the boundary dispute was settled by the surveying of the Mason–Dixon line in 1767.

By 1777, a road had been well established between York and Baltimore, and Stewartstown's main street of today lies along a portion of the road. Around 1812, a group of farmers set out to establish a town in south central Hopewell Township. The earliest buildings were several houses, a workshop for making furniture and wheels, a store, and a tavern. Anthony Stewart, owner of the workshop, served as the village clerk, and his shop became the main meeting place.

The village was first known as Meadstown, after Benedict Meads, owner of the tavern and the store. Later it became known as Mechanicsburg because of a large number of tradesmen who lived in the community. By 1828, the town had its own post office, and Stewart was appointed the first postmaster. There was already another Pennsylvania town named Mechanicsburg, so postal officials assigned the name "Guilford" to the community. Through the efforts of Anthony Stewart, with the help of Judge Adam Ebaugh, the Post Office Department changed the town's postmark to "Stewartstown" on March 24, 1832.

The Stewartstown Engine House, Stewartstown Railroad and Stewartstown Railroad Station are listed on the National Register of Historic Places.

== Geography ==
Stewartstown is located at 39°45′15″N 76°35′35″W (39.754106, -76.593181).

According to the United States Census Bureau, the borough has a total area of 0.8 square miles (2.1 km^{2}), all land.

== Demographics ==
Historical population
Census	Pop.	Note	%±
1860	189		—
1870	212		12.2%
1880	303		42.9%
1890	441		45.5%
1900	573		29.9%
1910	674		17.6%
1920	718		6.5%
1930	863		20.2%
1940	985		14.1%
1950	1,133		15.0%
1960	1,164		2.7%
1970	1,157		−0.6%
1980	1,072		−7.3%
1990	1,308		22.0%
2000	1,752		33.9%
2010	2,089		19.2%
2020	2,129		1.9%
2021 (est.)	2,153	▲	1.1%
U.S. Decennial Census

As of the census of 2000, there were 1,752 people, 678 households, and 513 families residing in the borough. The population density was 2,091.9 inhabitants per square mile (807.7/km^{2}). There were 718 housing units at an average density of 857.3 per square mile (331.0/km^{2}). The racial makeup of the borough was 96.69% White, 1.60% African American, 0.29% Native American, 0.46% Asian, 0.23% from other races, and 0.74% from two or more races. Hispanic or Latino of any race were 1.26% of the population.

There were 678 households, out of which 39.5% had children under the age of 18 living with them, 58.4% were married couples living together, 13.0% had a female householder with no husband present, and 24.2% were non-families. 21.2% of all households were made up of individuals, and 7.7% had someone living alone who was 65 years of age or older. The average household size was 2.58 and the average family size was 2.99.

In the borough the population was spread out, with 29.0% under the age of 18, 5.9% from 18 to 24, 35.8% from 25 to 44, 20.0% from 45 to 64, and 9.4% who were 65 years of age or older. The median age was 34 years. For every 100 females there were 95.8 males. For every 100 females age 18 and over, there were 93.5 males.

The median income for a household in the borough was $50,000, and the median income for a family was $54,891. Males had a median income of $41,643 versus $28,500 for females. The per capita income for the borough was $22,095. About 2.9% of families and 4.1% of the population were below the poverty line, including 3.7% of those under age 18 and 8.8% of those age 65 or over.

== Education ==
Stewartstown is served by the South Eastern School District which provides a public education.

== Notable person ==
- Wendy Fulton, actress, graduate of Kennard-Dale HS, married to Dwight Schultz, an actor as well.

== See also ==
- Stewartstown Railroad
