= New Freedom, Pennsylvania =

Borough in Pennsylvania, US

- Borough
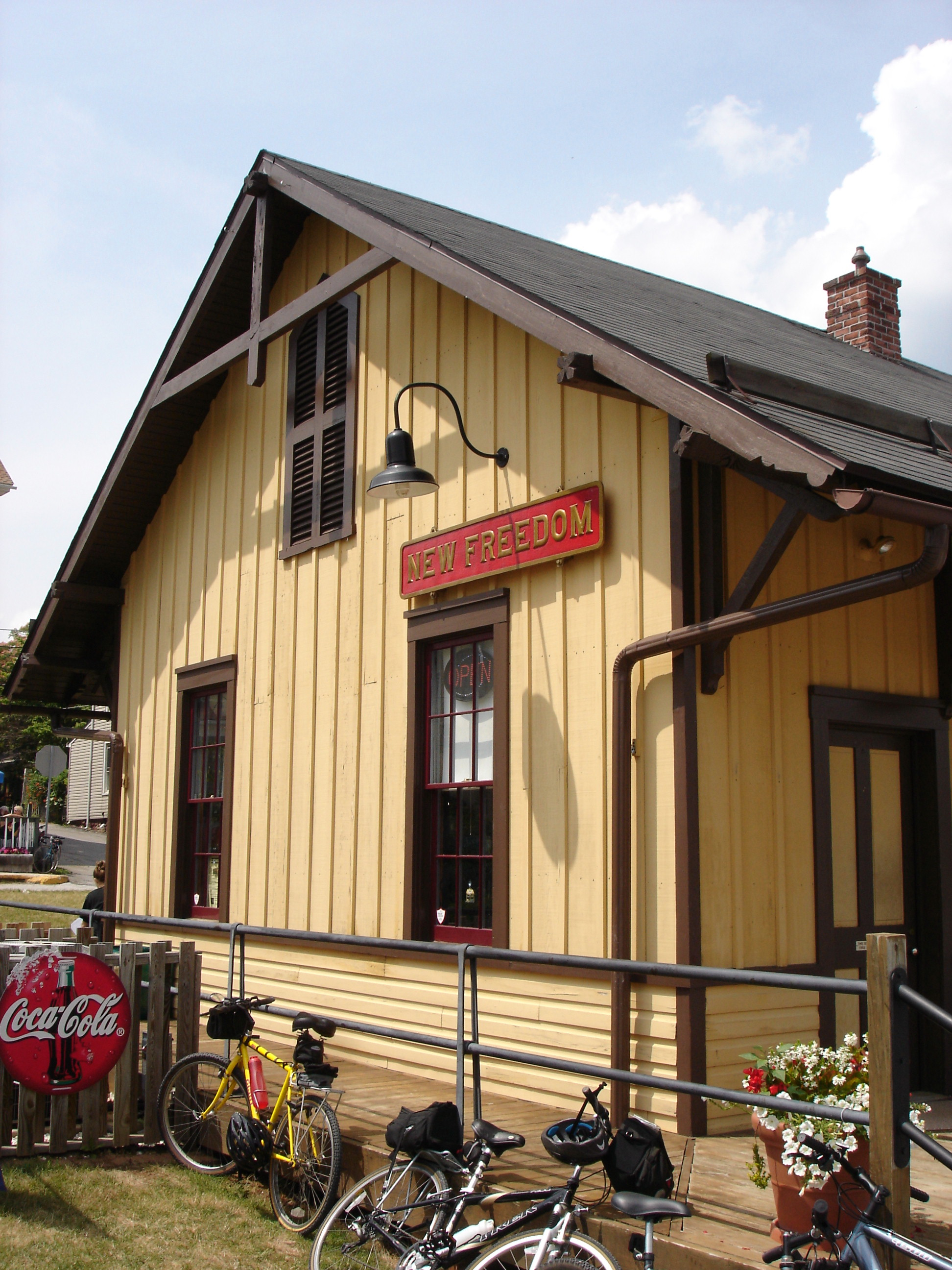
- Former Pennsylvania Railroad Station, now a restaurant and museum on the York County Heritage Rail Trail County Park

- Location in York County and the U.S. state of Pennsylvania.

- Location of New Freedom in Pennsylvania New Freedom (the United States)
- Coordinates: 39°44′12″N 76°41′55″W
- Country: United States
- State: Pennsylvania
- County: York
- Settled: 1783
- Incorporated: 1879

Government
  - Type: Borough Council
  - Mayor: Kim Butcher

Area
  - Total: 2.08 sq mi (5.39 km^{2})
  - Land: 2.08 sq mi (5.39 km^{2})
  - Water: 0 sq mi (0.00 km^{2})
- Elevation: 643 ft (196 m)

Population (2020)
  - Total: 4,877
  - Density: 2,344.1/sq mi (905.06/km^{2})
- Time zone: UTC-5 (Eastern (EST))
  - Summer (DST): UTC-4 (EDT)
- ZIP code: 17349
- Area code: 717
- FIPS code: 42-53568
- Website: New Freedom

New Freedom is a borough in York County, Pennsylvania, United States. As of the 2020 census, the borough had a population of 4,874. Once an industrial/railroad town, the community has evolved into a predominantly residential community.

== History ==
New Freedom Borough is located in the southern portion of York County, Pennsylvania. The borough borders the Mason–Dixon line and was incorporated in 1873. Originally named “Freedom” for the Free family, there was another town already in existence with that name, so New Freedom was chosen as the official name.

People of German, English, and Scotch-Irish descent settled the area. The rich, fertile soil provided a comfortable living for farming and agricultural opportunities. Summers Canning Company operated in the town for years, canning the freshest harvests and then shipping the final products. Summers Canning Company was sold to Hanover Foods in 1984. A mural depicting scenes from the Summers Canning Company is displayed on a building along the York County Heritage Rail Trail.

The Northern Central Railway was a primary factor for early growth of the town. The rail service established a vital means of commerce and transportation until Hurricane Agnes in 1972 destroyed much of the rail line and bridges in York County.

Located 30 miles north of Baltimore, Maryland and 38 miles south of Harrisburg, Pennsylvania, the town is changing from an area of commerce and minor industry to a commuter community.

== Geography ==
New Freedom is located at 39°44′12″N 76°41′55″W (39.736703, −76.698541).

According to the United States Census Bureau, the borough has a total area of 2.0 square miles (5.2 km^{2}), all land.

== Demographics ==
Historical population
Census	Pop.	Note	%±
1880	324		—
1890	364		12.3%
1900	550		51.1%
1910	726		32.0%
1920	906		24.8%
1930	1,125		24.2%
1940	1,137		1.1%
1950	1,271		11.8%
1960	1,395		9.8%
1970	1,495		7.2%
1980	2,205		47.5%
1990	2,920		32.4%
2000	3,512		20.3%
2010	4,464		27.1%
2020	4,877		9.3%
2021 (est.)	5,090	▲	4.4%

=== 2020 census ===
As of the 2020 census, New Freedom had a population of 4,877. The median age was 43.7 years. 23.6% of residents were under the age of 18 and 19.5% of residents were 65 years of age or older. For every 100 females there were 95.2 males, and for every 100 females age 18 and over there were 92.8 males age 18 and over.

100.0% of residents lived in urban areas, while 0.0% lived in rural areas.

There were 1,830 households in New Freedom, of which 35.4% had children under the age of 18 living in them. Of all households, 63.8% were married-couple households, 11.5% were households with a male householder and no spouse or partner present, and 19.7% were households with a female householder and no spouse or partner present. About 18.2% of all households were made up of individuals and 8.7% had someone living alone who was 65 years of age or older.

There were 1,882 housing units, of which 2.8% were vacant. The homeowner vacancy rate was 1.0% and the rental vacancy rate was 4.0%.

Racial composition as of the 2020 census
Race	Number	Percent
White	4,407	90.4%
Black or African American	118	2.4%
American Indian and Alaska Native	15	0.3%
Asian	60	1.2%
Native Hawaiian and Other Pacific Islander	0	0.0%
Some other race	44	0.9%
Two or more races	233	4.8%
Hispanic or Latino (of any race)	135	2.8%

=== 2000 census ===
As of the 2000 census, there were 3,512 people, 1,296 households, and 1,031 families residing in the borough. The population density was 1,711.8 people per square mile (660.9 people/km^{2}). There were 1,340 housing units at an average density of 653.1 per square mile (252.2/km^{2}). The racial makeup of the borough was 96.53% White, 0.77% African American, 0.14% Native American, 1.40% Asian, 0.03% Pacific Islander, 0.09% from other races, and 1.05% from two or more races. Hispanic or Latino of any race were 0.48% of the population.

There were 1,296 households, out of which 38.4% had children under the age of 18 living with them, 70.1% were married couples living together, 7.1% had a female householder with no spouse present, and 20.4% were non-families. 16.9% of all households were made up of individuals, and 7.3% had someone living alone who was 65 years of age or older. The average household size was 2.70 and the average family size was 3.04.

In the borough the population was spread out, with 26.2% under the age of 18, 5.8% from 18 to 24, 29.0% from 25 to 44, 27.8% from 45 to 64, and 11.3% who were 65 years of age or older. The median age was 40 years. For every 100 females there were 94.9 males. For every 100 females age 18 and over, there were 93.8 males.

The median income for a household in the borough was $66,458, and the median income for a family was $70,319. Males had a median income of $46,563 versus $31,576 for females. The per capita income for the borough was $24,828. About 1.3% of families and 2.7% of the population were below the poverty line, including 1.3% of those under age 18 and 11.7% of those age 65 or over.

== Community ==
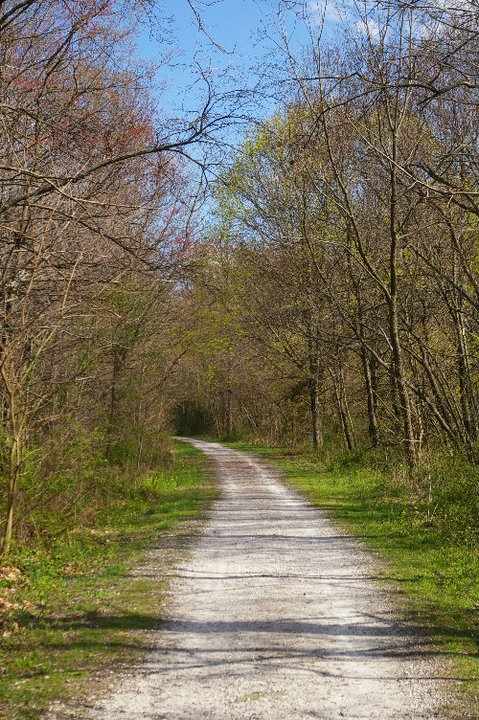
Section of the York County Heritage Rail Trail that runs through New Freedom.

The York County Heritage Rail Trail cuts through the center of New Freedom. The trail, which was established in 1992, runs from just south of New Freedom 21 miles (34 km) north into the city of York. The trail also connects to 20-mile-long (32 km) Northern Central Railroad Trail in Maryland, heading south from the Mason-Dixon line.

Popular seasonal events in New Freedom include:

- The New Freedom Lions Club Carnival, held annually in July since the 1930s
- The Annual New Freedom Fest held the third weekend of September, a revival of the New Freedom's Farmers Improvement Fair that was held this same weekend in the early 1900s for many years
- Outdoor Movie Night held three times each summer where families can gather with their blankets and lawn chairs and enjoy a classic movie.

A community park in the middle of town is known as the "Freedom Green".

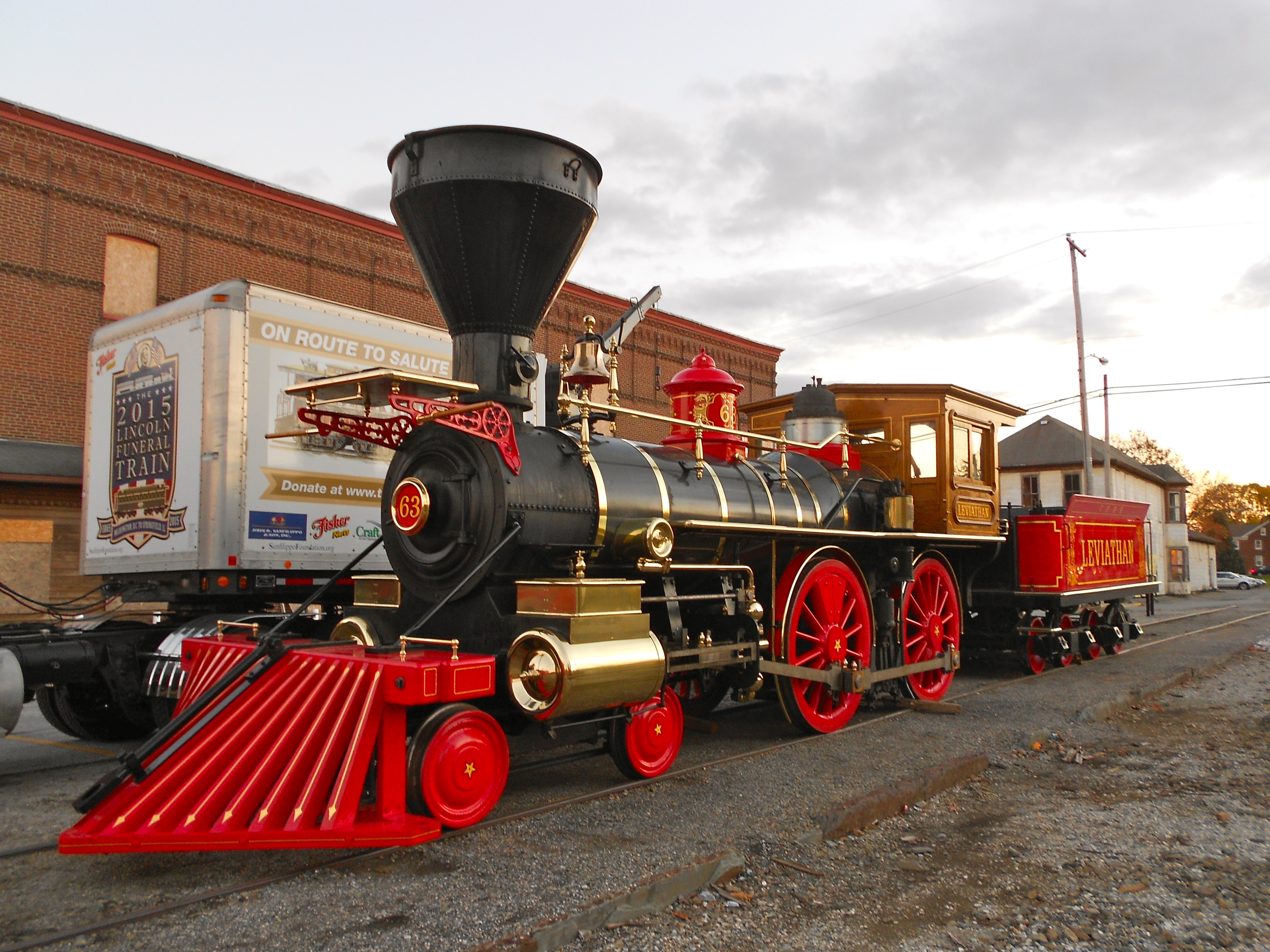
The Leviathan, a replica of Abraham Lincoln's funeral train, in New Freedom

New Freedom teens attend Susquehannock High School and Southern Middle School, part of Pennsylvania's Southern York County School District, as well as private schools including Shrewsbury Christian Academy, York Catholic High School, or York Country Day School. In 2010, St. John the Baptist opened a new Roman Catholic Parochial School in the New Freedom borough.

New Freedom is home to the D. Landreth Seed Company, which is the oldest seed company in America.

== Notable people ==
- Sterling Ruby, American artist who works in ceramics, painting, drawing, collage, sculpture and video.
- Jarace Walker, NBA basketball player who lived in New Freedom before moving away in 9th grade.
- Ron Wolf, former general manager of the National Football League's Green Bay Packers and 2015 inductee to the Professional Football Hall of Fame.
