= Glen Rock, Pennsylvania =

Borough in Pennsylvania, US

- Borough
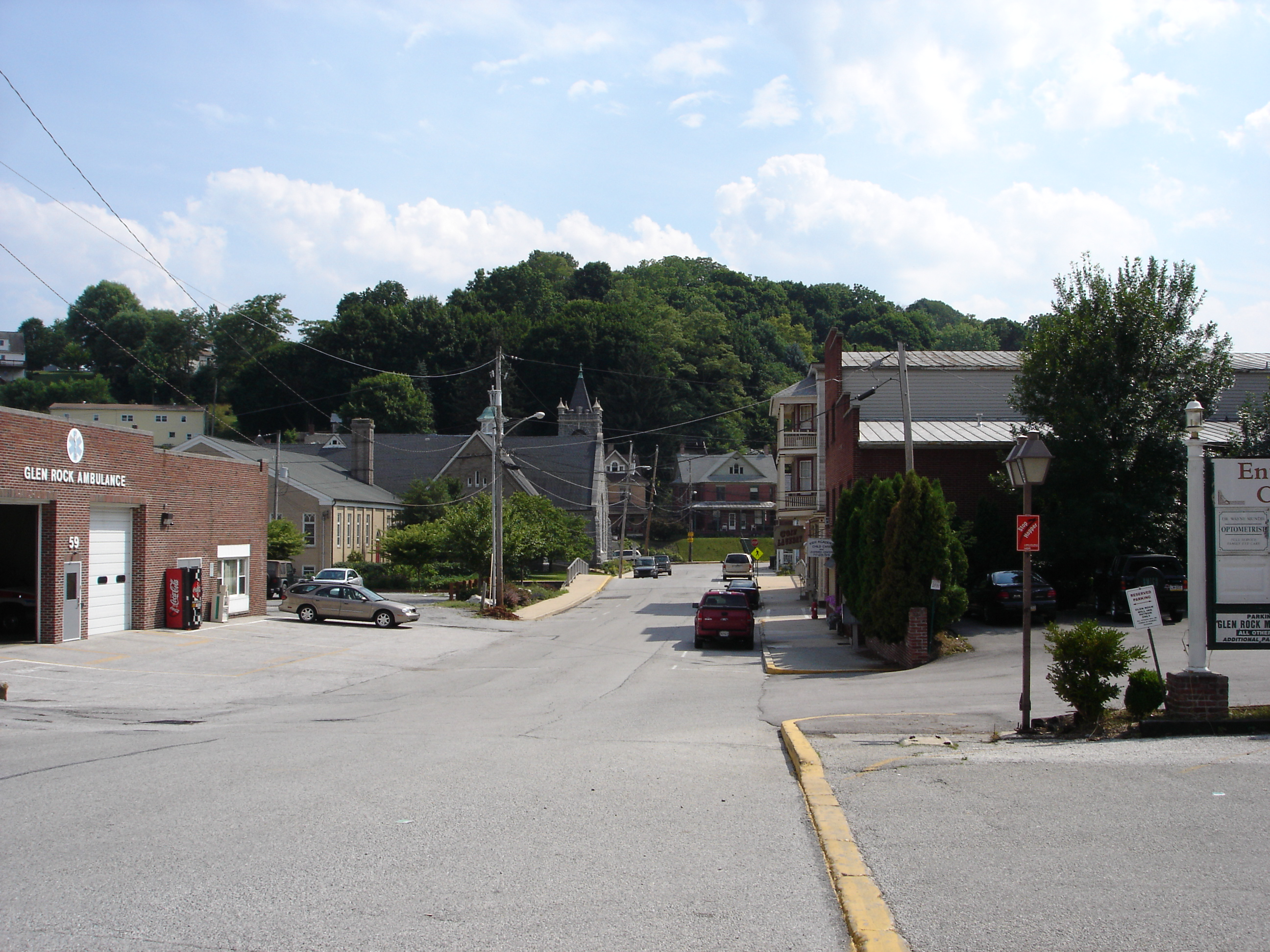
- Glen Rock, Pennsylvania

- Location in York County and the U.S. state of Pennsylvania.

- Location of Glen Rock in Pennsylvania Glen Rock (the United States)
- Coordinates: 39°47′36″N 76°43′53″W
- Country: United States
- State: Pennsylvania
- County: York
- Settled: 1838
- Incorporated: 1859

Government
  - Type: Borough Council
  - Mayor: Michelle Siesko

Area
  - Total: 0.80 sq mi (2.08 km^{2})
  - Land: 0.80 sq mi (2.08 km^{2})
  - Water: 0 sq mi (0.00 km^{2})
- Elevation: 636 ft (194 m)

Population (2020)
  - Total: 2,123
  - Estimate (2023): 2,122
  - Density: 2,647.3/sq mi (1,022.12/km^{2})
- Time zone: UTC-5 (Eastern (EST))
  - Summer (DST): UTC-4 (EDT)
- Zip code: 17327
- Area code: 717
- FIPS code: 42-29760
- Website: www.glenrockpa.org

Glen Rock is a borough in York County, Pennsylvania, United States. The population was 2,123 at the 2020 census. It is part of the York–Hanover metropolitan area.

== History ==
In 1826, William Heathcote, the town's founder and a native of Cheshire, England, moved to Pennsylvania in 1826. In 1837, he purchased a farm, hoping to tap into the adjacent river's hydropower potential, and constructed a brick woolen mill on the ruins of an abandoned sawmill on his property, attracting mill workers and farmers to the area. Later that decade, the area received its own passenger train station, followed by a post office, church, iron foundry and machine shop in 1840s. In December 1843, Heathcote suggested that the town be named Glen Rock, taking inspiration from various lines from the poem Marmion.

By 1858, Glen Rock had grown to a population of 200 people. It officially incorporated as a borough on August 29, 1859, following petitioning from its residents. The mill, currently the oldest surviving building in Glen Rock, closed for renovations in the 1980s and reopened as a boutique hotel and restaurant. In 2022, the mill received a Backing Historic Small Restaurants grant from the National Trust for Historic Preservation and American Express to outfit the building with architectural elements closer in-line with the era in which it was built.

The Glen Rock Historic District was listed on the National Register of Historic Places in 1997.

== Geography ==
Glen Rock is located at 39°47′36″N 76°43′53″W (39.793471, -76.731520).

According to the United States Census Bureau, the borough has a total area of 0.8 square miles (2.1 km^{2}), all land.

== Demographics ==
Historical population
Census	Pop.	Note	%±
1860	289		—
1870	537		85.8%
1880	651		21.2%
1890	687		5.5%
1900	1,117		62.6%
1910	1,263		13.1%
1920	1,232		−2.5%
1930	1,309		6.3%
1940	1,412		7.9%
1950	1,477		4.6%
1960	1,546		4.7%
1970	1,600		3.5%
1980	1,662		3.9%
1990	1,688		1.6%
2000	1,809		7.2%
2010	2,025		11.9%
2020	2,121		4.7%
2023 (est.)	2,122	▲	0.0%

As of the census of 2000, there were 1,809 people (2,025 in the 2010 census), 708 households (785 in the 2010 census), and 506 families (543 in the 2010 census) living in the borough. The racial makeup of the borough was 98.07% White(96.1% in the 2010 census), 1.00% African American(2.9% in the 2010 census), 0.17% Native American, 0.33% Asian, 0.06% Pacific Islander, and 0.39% from two or more races. Hispanic or Latino of any race were 0.44% of the population (2.3% in the 2010 census).

There were 708 households (785 in the 2010 census) out of which 38.7% had children under the age of 18 living with them (36.3% in the 2010 census), 55.4% were married couples living together, 11.0% had a female householder with no husband present, and 28.5% were non-families. 23.7% of all households were made up of individuals, and 9.0% had someone living alone who was 65 years of age or older. The average household size was 2.56 and the average family size was 3.04.

In the borough the population was spread out, with 29.0% under the age of 18, 6.7% from 18 to 24, 33.9% from 25 to 44, 19.2% from 45 to 64, and 11.2% who were 65 years of age or older. The median age was 35 years. For every 100 females there were 99.4 males. For every 100 females age 18 and over, there were 96.5 males.

The median income for a household in the borough was $41,188, and the median income for a family was $50,865. Males had a median income of $33,571 versus $27,067 for females. The per capita income for the borough was $19,076. About 6.3% of families and 8.7% of the population were below the poverty line, including 15.0% of those under age 18 and 4.5% of those age 65 or over.

== Education ==
Glen Rock is served by the Southern York County School District. Students attend either Southern Elementary School or Friendship Elementary School for elementary schooling. All students attend Southern Middle School and Susquehannock High School.

== Carolers ==
Every Christmas, the Glen Rock Carolers sing carols throughout the borough from midnight until morning. This tradition began in 1848 and has continued uninterrupted since then. The carolers, a group of 50+ men, sing in three-part harmony and are accompanied by instruments, currently trumpets and trombones. Most of the carols sung are old English or old American and are not commonly heard anymore; only four carols have been added since 1900. The carolers themselves are recognized by their distinctive uniform consisting of gray high hats, greatcoats, gloves, and multi-color scarves. A concert given at 10:45 pm on Christmas Eve regularly attracts a crowd of around 1,000.

== Recreation ==
The Heritage Rail Trail County Park is a National Recreation Trail rail-with-trail in Pennsylvania built in 1999 by the York County Rail Trail Authority (YCRTA). It connects with the Torrey C. Brown Rail Trail in Maryland. The trail runs along the active Northern Central Railway line and forms the southernmost part of Route J in the BicyclePA route system.

The rail trail runs north through the borough intersecting Valley, Main and Water Streets. The rail line is active with passenger freight from Steam Into History located in nearby New Freedom, Pennsylvania.

The Glen Rock Park is located at 5400 Fair School Road adjacent to the borough. The park features a dog park, two ball fields, playground equipment, basketball and volleyball court, restroom facilities and pavilions available for rent. The park is managed by the Glen Rock recreation board.

The Annual Glen Rock Arts & Brew Fest is held on the Saturday of Memorial Day weekend. The event is primarily held in the area of Water Street and the Rail Trail with the craft beer event in Ruins Hall. Food and art vendors, a 5k race and family-friendly events are featured.

== Notable people ==
- Summer Britcher, (1994–), three-time Olympic luger.
- Randy Edsall, (1958–), football coach who served as the head coach of the UConn Huskies and Maryland Terrapins.
- Cliff Heathcote, (1898–1939) was a center fielder in Major League Baseball who played for the Chicago Cubs.
- Roland F. Seitz, (1867–1946), composer, bandmaster, and music publisher.
