= Mike Jones (Pennsylvania politician) =

American politician

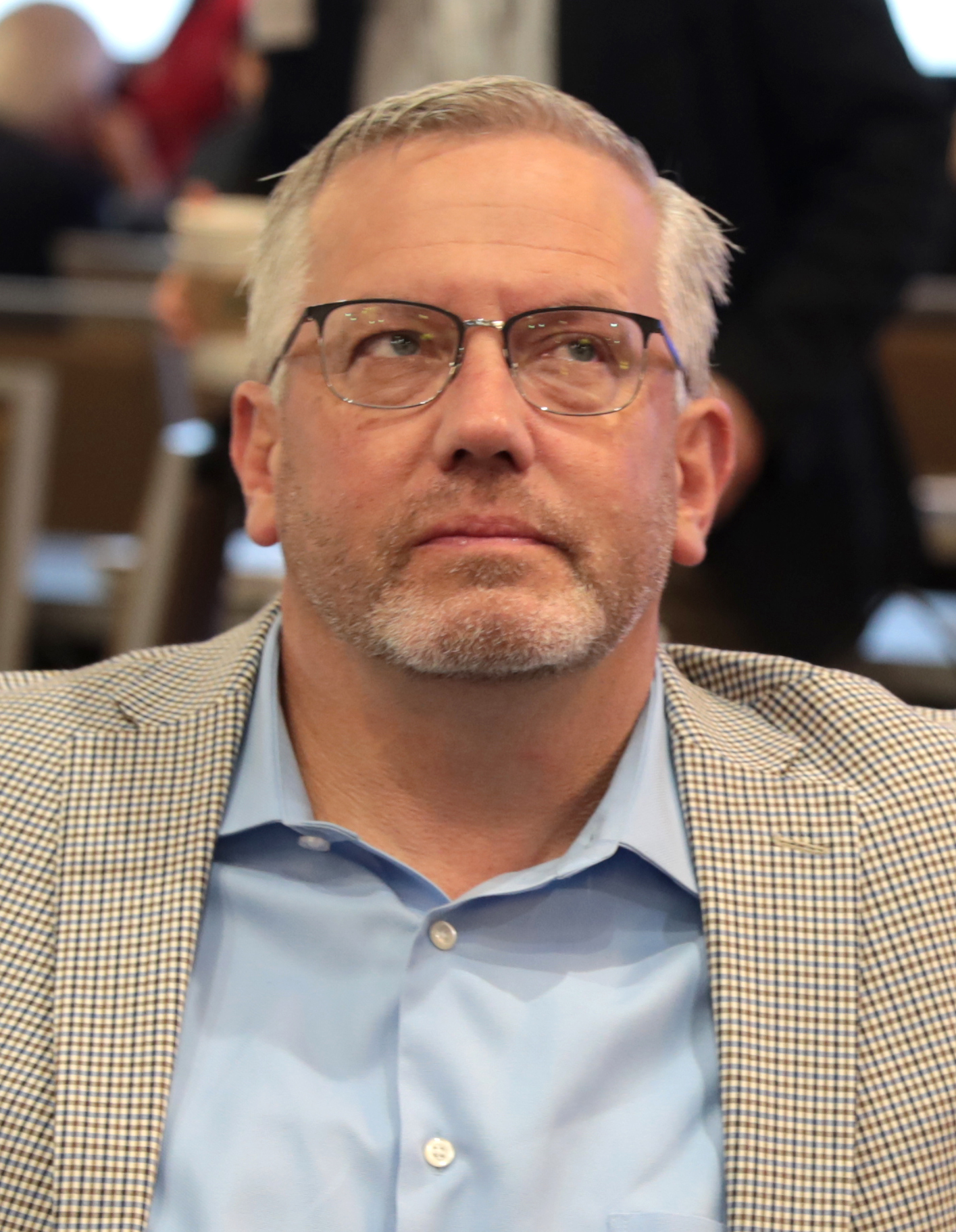
- Jones at the 2022 Hazlitt Summit hosted by Young Americans for Liberty Foundation

Member of the Pennsylvania House of Representatives from the 93rd district
- Incumbent
- Assumed office January 1, 2019
- Preceded by: Kristin Phillips-Hill

Personal details
- Born: c. 1969 York County, Pennsylvania, U.S.
- Party: Republican
- Spouse: Julie Anderson (m. 1992)
- Children: 4 (adopted)
- Education: DeVry University (BS)
- Alma mater: Dallastown Area High School
- Website: Official website

Paul Michael Jones (born c. 1969) is an American politician presently a member of the Pennsylvania House of Representatives. A member of the Republican Party, Jones has represented the 93rd District since 2019.

== Early life and education ==
Jones was born in York County, Pennsylvania, and grew up in Dallastown. He graduated from Dallastown Area High School in 1987, and earned a Bachelor of Science degree in electronic engineering technology from DeVry University in 1991.

== Business career ==
In 1994, Jones began working for St. Onge, a supply chain logistics company based in York, Pennsylvania. He was named president of the company in 2006. Jones served as president of St. Onge until his retirement in 2017.

== Political career ==
Jones served briefly served on the board of the Dallastown Area School District, having been elected in 2017, and resigning in 2019. His resignation came after he was elected to the Pennsylvania House of Representatives in 2018. Jones believed serving on both the school board and in the State House would constitute a conflict of interest.

Jones was first elected to represent the 93rd District in the Pennsylvania House of Representatives in 2018, winning re-election in 2020 and 2022.

In 2020, Jones founded the Economic Growth Caucus, made up of state representatives with backgrounds in business, Jones defined the group's purpose as promoting economic growth. Upon its founding Jones was made chairman of the caucus.

Jones opposed mitigation and lockdown measures imposed by Governor Tom Wolf during the COVID-19 pandemic. He claimed the economic impact of shutting down businesses to combat the spread of COVID would be "killing and devastating more lives than COVID ever will." He participated in the "Reopen Pennsylvania" rally outside the state capitol building, where protestors demanded Governor Wolf repeal lockdowns measures.

In 2020, Jones was among 26 Pennsylvania House Republicans who called for the reversal of Joe Biden's certification as the winner of Pennsylvania's electoral votes in the 2020 United States presidential election, citing false claims of election irregularities.

In 2022, Republican leadership removed Jones from three of his four committee assignments after he endorsed Joe D'Orsie and Wendy Fink in their primary challenges against incumbent Representatives Keith Gillespie and Stan Saylor, respectively. Jones said his decision to endorse the two challengers wasn't personal but "business" because Gillespie and Saylor didn't oppose COVID shutdowns. In response to his support for D'Orsie and Fink, the York County Republican Committee attempted to censure Jones. The censure vote reportedly failed, according to Jones. Both D'Orsie and Fink were successful in defeating the incumbent representatives.

Jones became a founding member of the Pennsylvania Freedom Caucus in late 2022 alongside twenty-two other Republicans in the State House.

== Personal life ==
Jones married his wife Julie (née Anderson) in 1992. The couple have four adoptive children from Russia.

== Electoral history ==
2017 Dallastown Area School Director Democratic primary election, Region 2
Party	Candidate	Votes	%
Democratic	Michael Jones	191	50.66
Democratic	Pamela D. Fraling	181	48.01
Write-in		5	1.33
Total votes		377	100.00

2017 Dallastown Area School Director Republican primary election, Region 2
Party	Candidate	Votes	%
Republican	Michael Jones	792	98.75
Write-in		10	1.25
Total votes		802	100.00

2017 Dallastown Area School Director election, Region 2
Party	Candidate	Votes	%
Democratic/Republican	Michael Jones	1,697	98.95
Write-in		18	1.05
Total votes		1,715	100.00

2018 Pennsylvania House of Representatives Republican primary election, District 93
Party	Candidate	Votes	%
Republican	Mike Jones	5,673	84.52
Republican	Matt Jansen	1,016	15.14
Write-in		23	0.34
Total votes		6,712	100.00

2018 Pennsylvania House of Representatives election, District 93
Party	Candidate	Votes	%
Republican	Mike Jones	18,036	65.83
Democratic	Delma Rivera-Lytle	9,341	34.09
Write-in		21	0.08
Total votes		27,398	100.00

2020 Pennsylvania House of Representatives election, District 93
Party	Candidate	Votes	%
Republican	Mike Jones	27,807	100.00
Total votes		27,807	100.00

2022 Pennsylvania House of Representatives election, District 93
Party	Candidate	Votes	%
Republican	Mike Jones	18,930	62.84
Democratic	Chris Rodkey	10,241	34.00
Keystone	Kristine Cousler-Womack	901	2.99
Write-in		52	0.52
Total votes		30,124	100.00
