= Scott Wagner =

American politician

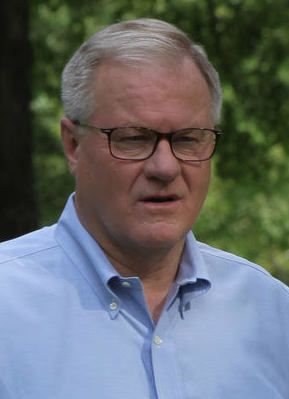

Member of the Pennsylvania Senate from the 28th district
- In office April 2, 2014 – June 4, 2018
- Preceded by: Mike Waugh
- Succeeded by: Kristin Phillips-Hill

Personal details
- Born: September 21, 1955 (age 70) York Township, Pennsylvania, U.S.
- Party: Republican
- Spouse(s): Candy Overlander (divorced); Ellen Beecher (divorced) Silvia Rodriguez (m. 1991; div. 2008) Tracy Higgs (m. 2014)
- Children: 2
- Education: Pennsylvania College of Technology (no degree)
- Website: State Senate website

Scott R. Wagner (born September 21, 1955) is an American businessman and politician from the Commonwealth of Pennsylvania. He represented the 28th district in the Pennsylvania State Senate. He was the Republican nominee for Governor of Pennsylvania in the 2018 election, losing by more than 800,000 votes to the incumbent Democrat Tom Wolf.

== Early life and education ==
Wagner is from Spring Garden Township in York County, Pennsylvania. He was raised on a farm. Wagner graduated from Dallastown Area High School in 1973. He then spent one semester at Williamsport Area Community College (now Pennsylvania College of Technology), but left school to pursue business ventures.

== Business career ==
Wagner bought his first plot of land for $8,500 at age 19, selling it two years later for a $4,000 profit. He then had several successful business ventures including a laundromat and ski shop, as well as buying a number of rental buildings. He also worked as a bail bondsman.

In 1985, Wagner co-founded the waste management company York Waste Disposal, a company which made $40 million a year, and which he sold in 1997. He then started Penn Waste in 2000, a company with 400 employees in 2018. The company has received over 30 violations and citations from the Pennsylvania Department of Environmental Protection over sixteen years, which Wagner claims have been unfair and overreaching (his company picks up garbage from 180,000 homes). In December 2019, Wagner sold Penn Waste to the Canadian company Waste Connections.

Wagner also owns three other companies, including a trucking company called KBS Trucking.

== Political career ==
=== Pennsylvania Senate (2014–2018) ===
Wagner ran in a March 2014 special election for the 28th district in the Pennsylvania Senate. When Ron Miller, an incumbent member of the Pennsylvania House of Representatives, declared his intentions to run for the seat, Wagner charged the Republican Party with cronyism. Wagner withdrew his name from consideration, but remained a candidate for the regularly scheduled primary election in May 2014. The York County Republicans selected Miller as their nominee, and Wagner chose to run in the special election as a write-in candidate against Miller and Linda Small, the Democratic Party nominee. Wagner ran on a fiscal conservative platform. He ran as an outsider, accusing party leaders of rigging the system against him, and became the first write-in candidate to win election to the Pennsylvania State Senate in history. In the election, Wagner received 10,595 votes (47.7%), Miller received 5,920 votes (26.6%) and Small received 5,704 votes (25.7%). Turnout was less than 14% of all registered voters in the district. He was sworn in on April 2, 2014.

In office, Wagner moved the General Assembly in a more fiscally conservative direction. He led efforts to replace Republican Dominic F. Pileggi as Senate majority leader and to install plaques under the Capitol portraits of Senate and House leaders with criminal convictions. Wagner used his own money in campaigns to help Republicans win seats in various parts of the state, and as Chairman of the Senate Republican Campaign Committee, he led Senate Republicans to achieve a 34-16 supermajority in the 2016 Pennsylvania Senate election.

As Chairman of the Senate Housing and Urban Affairs Committee, Wagner ushered the passage of a bill from the committee that would have established protections from discrimination in employment, housing, and public accommodation based on "sex, sexual orientation, gender identity or expression." It was the first time in eleven years of introducing such legislation that it passed a committee, though it did not advance to a vote by the full Senate.

Working with Democratic senator Anthony H. Williams of Philadelphia, Wagner introduced Clean Slate legislation to automatically seal non-violent misdemeanor conviction records after someone remains crime-free for ten years. Wagner and Williams' bill passed the Senate unanimously, and is nearly identical to the House's version which ultimately became law.

In the state Senate, Wagner supported natural gas drilling on state lands and called for reducing regulations on the oil and gas industry. Wagner inaccurately asserted in March 2017 that climate change is the result of Earth moving closer to the Sun and from greater body heat emanating from a greater number of humans; this debunked claim is contrary to the scientific consensus on climate change.

In December 2017, Wagner voted in favor of a bill in the state legislature that would ban abortion after 20 weeks of pregnancy. Governor Wolf vetoed the bill. Wagner later came out in support of a U.S. House bill that would ban abortion as soon as the fetus has a heartbeat. Wagner has also cosponsored bills that would prevent the use of state funds for non-abortion services, such as birth control and cancer screening, at Planned Parenthood.

Wagner has been critical of labor unions, and has stated that he supports right-to-work legislation. In 2014, he compared public sector unions to Adolf Hitler and Vladimir Putin, later apologizing for the "unfortunate analogy."

Wagner resigned from the Senate in June 2018 after winning the Republican nomination for governor.

=== 2018 gubernatorial campaign ===
Wagner ran as a Republican candidate for Governor of Pennsylvania in the 2018 election, challenging Democratic incumbent governor Tom Wolf; Wagner became the Republican nominee after winning the primary on May 15, 2018. Wagner contracted Red Mavericks, a media, strategy and fundraising firm led by Harrisburg political operative and lobbyist Ray Zaborney, after having previously decried the use of political consultants. Wagner resigned from the state senate on June 4, 2018, to focus on his gubernatorial campaign. Prior to the 2018 gubernatorial election, Wagner declined to release his tax returns, suggesting that labor unions will use it to try to organize workers at his company. Wagner's company Penn Waste, which reported $75 million in revenue in 2017, is non-unionized.

Wagner and Wolf had a televised debate moderated by Alex Trebek. Wagner originally called for debates in all 67 counties in Pennsylvania. He called Wolf a "chicken" for not having more debates.

In a campaign video, Wagner threatened to "stomp all over" his opponent's face, saying: "Gov. Wolf, let me tell you between now and Nov 6, you better put a catcher's mask on your face because I'm going to stomp all over your face with golf spikes. Because I'm going to win for the state of Pennsylvania, and we are throwing you out of office because, you know what, I'm sick and tired of your negative ads." In a later video, Wagner said, "I may have chosen a poor metaphor. I may have had poor choice of words. I shouldn't have said what I said."

During the campaign, Wagner was endorsed by the NRA Political Victory Fund, which had given him an "A" rating in the past. Wagner said that he would roll back Wolf's Medicaid expansion under the Affordable Care Act (in 2015, Wolf expanded Medicaid to 700,000 Pennsylvanians). After initially suggesting that he might support a bill that would end recognition of same-sex marriage in Pennsylvania, Wagner issued a clarification saying that, if governor, he would veto any bill that restricts marriage rights for same-sex couples. Wagner pledged to eliminating property taxes, including school taxes, statewide, and adopting zero-based budgeting. During his campaign, Wagner said he favored a tougher stance on school bullying, supported school uniforms for all students, and spoke out against standardized testing. Wagner supported leasing Pennsylvania's wholesale liquor industry and privatizing the sale of alcohol, using $500 million in projected savings for education programs. He expressed support for "clear sentencing and bail guidelines" but did not endorse the elimination of cash bail. Wagner also pledged to reverse Wolf's moratorium on the death penalty, supporting restoration of capital punishment in Pennsylvania. Regarding the opioid epidemic, Wagner said that if elected governor, he would sue pharmaceutical companies. Wagner proposed the creation of a fund to extent loans to people, especially those in poor communities, to open new businesses; he also criticized the state's existing public assistance programs.

In a 2018 campaign appearance, a student challenged Wagner's claim that climate change is being caused by human body heat and asked whether his belief was the result of the money he received from the fossil fuel industry. Wagner responded by calling the student "young and naive" and said that Pennsylvanians are trying to elect a governor, not a scientist.

In the November 2018 election, Wagner was easily defeated by Wolf. Wagner spent more than $23 million on his primary campaign and $22 million on his general election campaign. Wagner self-funded most of his campaign, and was his own largest contributor.

=== Republican Party financing and Trump support ===
A lifelong member of the Republican Party, Wagner has donated more than $3.2 million to state and local campaigns since 2007.

Wagner is a supporter of President Donald Trump. Wagner has compared himself to Trump, and similarities of style have been commented upon by others. Wagner expressed support for the Trump travel ban and called the Russia investigation "a lot of propaganda." Trump endorsed Wagner for governor in 2018. Wagner and the Republican nominee for U.S. Senate, Lou Barletta, appeared with Trump at an October 2018 rally in Erie, Pennsylvania.

=== Antisemitism controversies ===
In 2017, Wagner denounced billionaire businessman and political donor George Soros (a U.S. citizen since 1961) as a "Hungarian Jew" who has a "hatred for America." Wagner rejected calls from Jewish and Christian clergy asking him to apologize for the remarks, and the Democratic Party in the state denounced his comments as anti-Semitic. In September 2018, Wagner approvingly cited an anonymous anecdote circulating on the conspiratorial website InfoWars that complained that "America is 'becoming a nation of victims where every Tom, Ricardo and Hasid is part of a special group with special rights."

=== 2024 Republican primary campaign ===
Wagner had a leadership role the Never Back Down Super PAC which supported Ron DeSantis' campaign in the 2024 Republican Party presidential primaries. After serving as a board member of the Super PAC, he was appointed chairman after the resignation of Adam Laxalt in November 2023 and chief executive officer after CEO Kristin Davison was fired in December 2023.

== Personal life ==
Wagner has been married four times. His marriages to legal secretary Candy Overlander, receptionist Ellen Beecher, and translator Silvia Rodriguez ended in divorce. Following his divorce from Rodriguez in 2012, Wagner married former trucking company owner Tracy Higgs in 2014. He has two daughters, Katharine and Cristina. Katharine filed a protection-from-abuse order against him in 2006 but no charges were filed. They later reconciled and she has been employed by him for several years and worked on his Senate campaign.

== Electoral history ==
2014 Special Election 28th Senatorial District
Party	Candidate	Votes	%
Write-In	Scott Wagner	10,654	47.51
Republican	Ron Miller	5,951	26.54
Democratic	Linda E. Small	5,744	25.61
Write-In	Other Scattered Write-Ins	76	0.34
Total votes		22,425	100.00

2014 Primary Election 28th Senatorial District
Party	Candidate	Votes	%
Republican	Scott Wagner (inc.)	13,214	84.91
Republican	Zachary A. Hearn	2,349	15.09
Total votes		15,563	100.00

2014 General Election 28th Senatorial District
Party	Candidate	Votes	%
Republican	Scott Wagner (inc.)	46,247	64.72
Democratic	Linda Small	25,205	35.28
Total votes		71,452	100.00
Republican hold			

2018 Pennsylvania gubernatorial election, Republican Primary
Party	Candidate	Votes	%
Republican	Scott Wagner	324,013	44.3
Republican	Paul Mango	270,014	36.9
Republican	Laura Ellsworth	137,650	18.8
Total votes		731,677	100.0

2018 Pennsylvania gubernatorial election
Party	Candidate	Votes	%	±%
Democratic	Tom Wolf (incumbent) John Fetterman	2,895,652	57.77%	+2.84%
Republican	Scott Wagner Jeff Bartos	2,039,882	40.70%	−4.37%
Libertarian	Ken Krawchuk Kathleen Smith	49,229	0.98%	N/A
Green	Paul Glover Jocolyn Bowser-Bostick	27,792	0.55%	N/A
Total votes		5,012,555	100.00%	N/A
Democratic hold				

Pennsylvania State Senate
Preceded by Mike Waugh	Member of the Pennsylvania Senate from the 28th district 2014–2018	Succeeded by Kristin Phillips-Hill
Party political offices
Preceded by Tom Corbett	Republican nominee for Governor of Pennsylvania; 2018	Succeeded by Doug Mastriano
