= Pennsylvania House of Representatives, District 93 =

American legislative district

Pennsylvania's 93rd State House of Representatives district
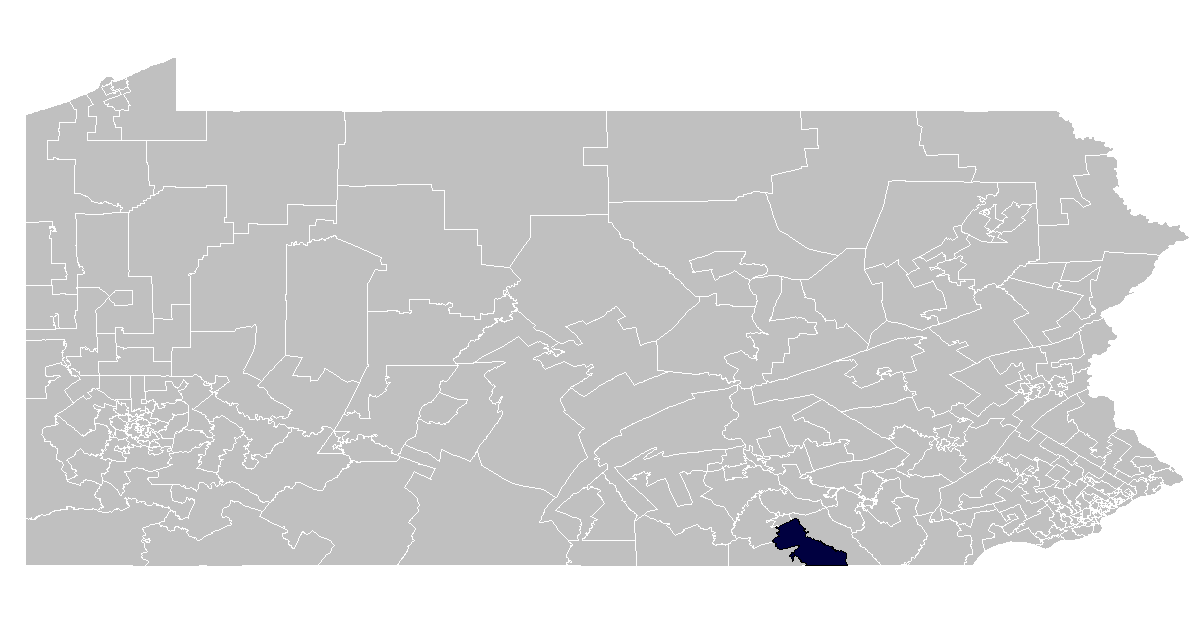
Representative
Mike Jones; R–York Township
- Population (2022): 65,319

The 93rd Pennsylvania House of Representatives District is located in South Central Pennsylvania and has been represented by Mike Jones since 2019.

== District profile ==
The 93rd District is located in York County and includes the following areas:

- Cross Roads
- Dallastown
- East Hopewell Township
- Fawn Grove
- Fawn Township
- Hopewell Township
- Jacobus
- Loganville
- North Hopewell Township
- Shrewsbury
- Springfield Township
- Stewartstown
- Winterstown
- Yoe
- York Township

== Representatives ==
Representative	Party	Years	District home	Note
Prior to 1969, seats were apportioned by county.
Harold B. Rudisill	Democrat	1969		Died on May 18, 1969
Raymond L. Hovis	Democrat	1969 – 1972		Elected November 1969 to fill vacancy.
A. Carville Foster, Jr.	Republican	1973 – 1992		
Mike Waugh	Republican	1993 – 1998	Glen Rock	
Ron Miller	Republican	1999 – 2014	Jacobus	
Kristin Phillips-Hill	Republican	2015 – 2019	York Township	
Mike Jones	Republican	2019 – present		Incumbent
