= Pennsylvania's 28th Senate district =

American legislative district

Pennsylvania's 28th State Senate district
Senator
Kristin Phillips-Hill; R–York Township
- Population (2021): 262,475

Pennsylvania State Senate District 28 includes part of York County. It is currently represented by Republican Kristin Phillips-Hill.

== District profile ==
The district includes the following areas:

- Chanceford Township
- Codorus Township
- Cross Roads
- Dallastown
- Delta
- East Hopewell Township
- East Prospect
- Fawn Grove
- Fawn Township
- Felton
- Glen Rock
- Hallam
- Hanover
- Heidelberg Township
- Hellam Township
- Hopewell Township
- Jackson Township
- Jacobus
- Jefferson
- Loganville
- Lower Chanceford Township
- Lower Windsor Township
- Manheim Township
- New Freedom
- New Salem
- North Codorus Township
- North Hopewell Township
- North York
- Paradise Township
- Peach Bottom Township
- Penn Township
- Railroad
- Red Lion
- Seven Valleys
- Shrewsbury
- Shrewsbury Township
- Spring Garden Township
- Spring Grove
- Springettsbury Township
- Springfield Township
- Stewartstown
- West Manheim Township
- Windsor
- Windsor Township
- Winterstown
- Wrightsville
- Yoe
- York Township
- Yorkana

== Senators ==
Representative	Party	Years	District home	Note	Counties
Guy Leader	Democratic	1943–1951			York
George M. Leader	Democratic	1951–1954		Elected as governor	York
Harry E. Seyler	Democratic	1955–1962			York
Robert O. Beers	Republican	1963–1966			York
Robert O. Beers	Republican	1967–1970			York (part)
Ralph W. Hess	Republican	1971–1972			York (part)
Ralph W. Hess	Republican	1973–1982			Lancaster (part), York (part)
Ralph W. Hess	Republican	1983–1990			York (part)
Michael E. Bortner	Democratic	1991–1994			York (part)
Daniel S. Delp	Republican	1995–1998			York (part)
Michael L. Waugh	Republican	1999–2014		Resigned after battling cancer and accepted appointment as executive director of the Pennsylvania Farm Show Complex & Expo Center	York (part)
Scott Wagner	Republican	2014–2018		Resigned to run for governor	York (part)
Kristin Phillips-Hill	Republican	2019–present			York (part)
