= Kenny Johnson (wide receiver) =

American football player (born 2005)

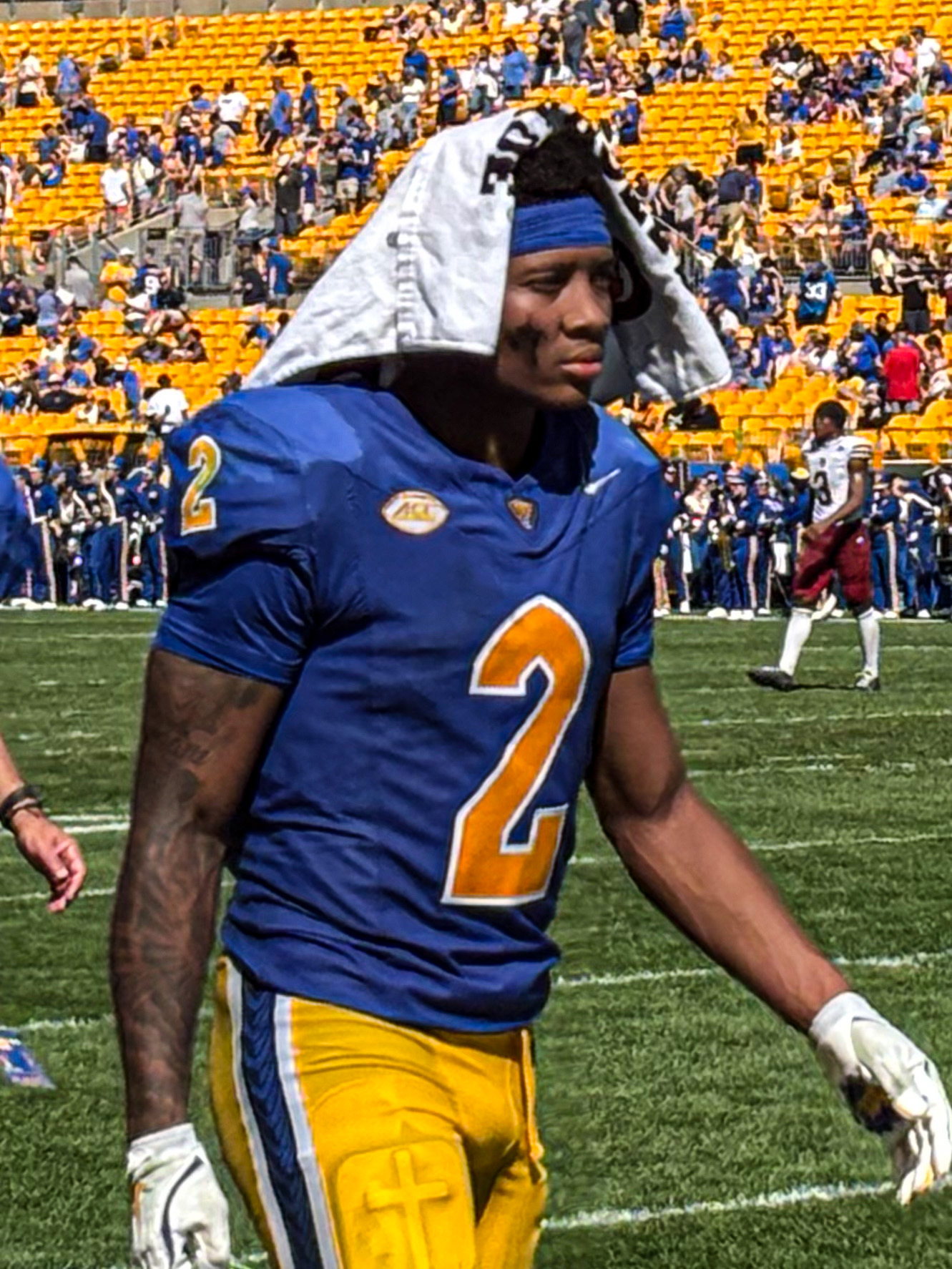
- Johnson with Pittsburgh in 2025

No. 4 – Texas Tech Red Raiders
- Position: Wide receiver
- Class: Senior

Personal information
- Born: March 28, 2005 (age 21); Baltimore, MD, U.S.
- Listed height: 6 ft 1 in (1.85 m)
- Listed weight: 200 lb (91 kg)

Career information
- High school: Dallastown Area (Dallastown, Pennsylvania)
- College: Pittsburgh (2023–2025); Texas Tech (2026–present)
- Stats at ESPN

Kenny Johnson (born March 28, 2005) is an American college football wide receiver for the Texas Tech Red Raiders. He previously played for the Pittsburgh Panthers.

== Early life ==
Johnson attended Dallastown Area High School in Dallastown, Pennsylvania, and was invited to play in the 2023 Big 33 Game, where he earned game MVP honors after posting nine receptions for 161 yards and a touchdown. Coming out of high school, he was rated as a three-star recruit and committed to play college football for the Pittsburgh Panthers over offers from schools such as Toledo, Penn State, Rutgers, and West Virginia.

== College career ==
=== Pittsburgh Panthers ===
In week 4 of the 2023 season, Johnson recorded his first career touchdown, returning a kickoff 100 yards against North Carolina. In week 8, he hauled in four receptions for 31 yards as well as his first receiving touchdown in a loss to Wake Forest. During Johnson's first collegiate season in 2023, he played in 12 games where he made four starts, totaling 15 receptions for 122 yards and a touchdown, while also rushing ten times for 72 yards, and adding 347 yards and a touchdown as a kick returner.

Johnson finished his 2024 season with 45 catches for 537 yards and three touchdowns. He also rushed for 26 yards on six carries. In 2025, he recorded 48 receptions for 659 yards and five touchdowns in 13 games played.

On December 30, 2025, Johnson entered the NCAA transfer portal.

=== Texas Tech Red Raiders ===
On January 7th, 2026, Johnson committed to the Texas Tech Red Raiders. In week 3 of the 2026 season against the Houston Cougars, Johnson caught four receptions for 113 yards and a touchdown in the Red Raiders' 28-26 win.
