= Ron DeSantis 2024 presidential campaign =

American political campaign

Ron DeSantis for President
- Campaign: 2024 Republican primaries; 2024 U.S. presidential election
- Candidate: Ron DeSantis; 46th Governor of Florida (2019–present); U.S. Representative (2013–2018)
- Affiliation: Republican Party
- Announced: May 24, 2023
- Suspended: January 21, 2024
- Headquarters: Tallahassee, Florida
- Key people: Casey DeSantis (wife and advisor); James Uthmeier (campaign manager); Dustin Carmack (policy director); Bryan Griffin (press secretary)
- Receipts: US$39,134,022.96 (January 31, 2024)
- Slogan(s): Our Great American Comeback; Never Back Down

Website
- rondesantis.com (archived – January 1, 2024)

On May 24, 2023, Ron DeSantis, the 46th and current governor of Florida, announced his candidacy for the 2024 United States presidential election. On January 21, 2024, DeSantis suspended his campaign and endorsed former President Donald Trump. DeSantis's campaign finished after having won nine delegates from the Republican National Convention in the 2024 Republican Party presidential primaries.

DeSantis won election to the U.S. House of Representatives in 2012 and was reelected in 2014 and 2016. He sought Marco Rubio's U.S. Senate seat in 2016, withdrawing when Rubio announced he would seek reelection. In 2018, he was elected governor of Florida, winning reelection in 2022 in a landslide. DeSantis's aggressive decisions during his governorship led to speculation that he would run for president. Rupert Murdoch's New York Post, The Wall Street Journal, and Fox News promoted DeSantis as an alternative to former president Donald Trump following the January 6 Capitol attack. In early 2023, he began a book tour for his newly published memoir The Courage to Be Free in early voting states.

DeSantis officially announced his campaign in a Twitter Spaces discussion with Elon Musk, following the release of his plans to the Associated Press a day earlier. Technical issues affected the discussion and became a focal point for critics. His campaign began with an in-person event in Iowa, followed by a tour in early voting states. DeSantis focused on his governorship and his policy record. In particular, he touted his stance on LGBT issues and his handling of the COVID-19 pandemic in Florida in an effort to differentiate himself from Trump. Although DeSantis initially had competitive support to Trump according to aggregate FiveThirtyEight polls, the margin between Trump and DeSantis steadily widened over the course of 2023.

== Background ==
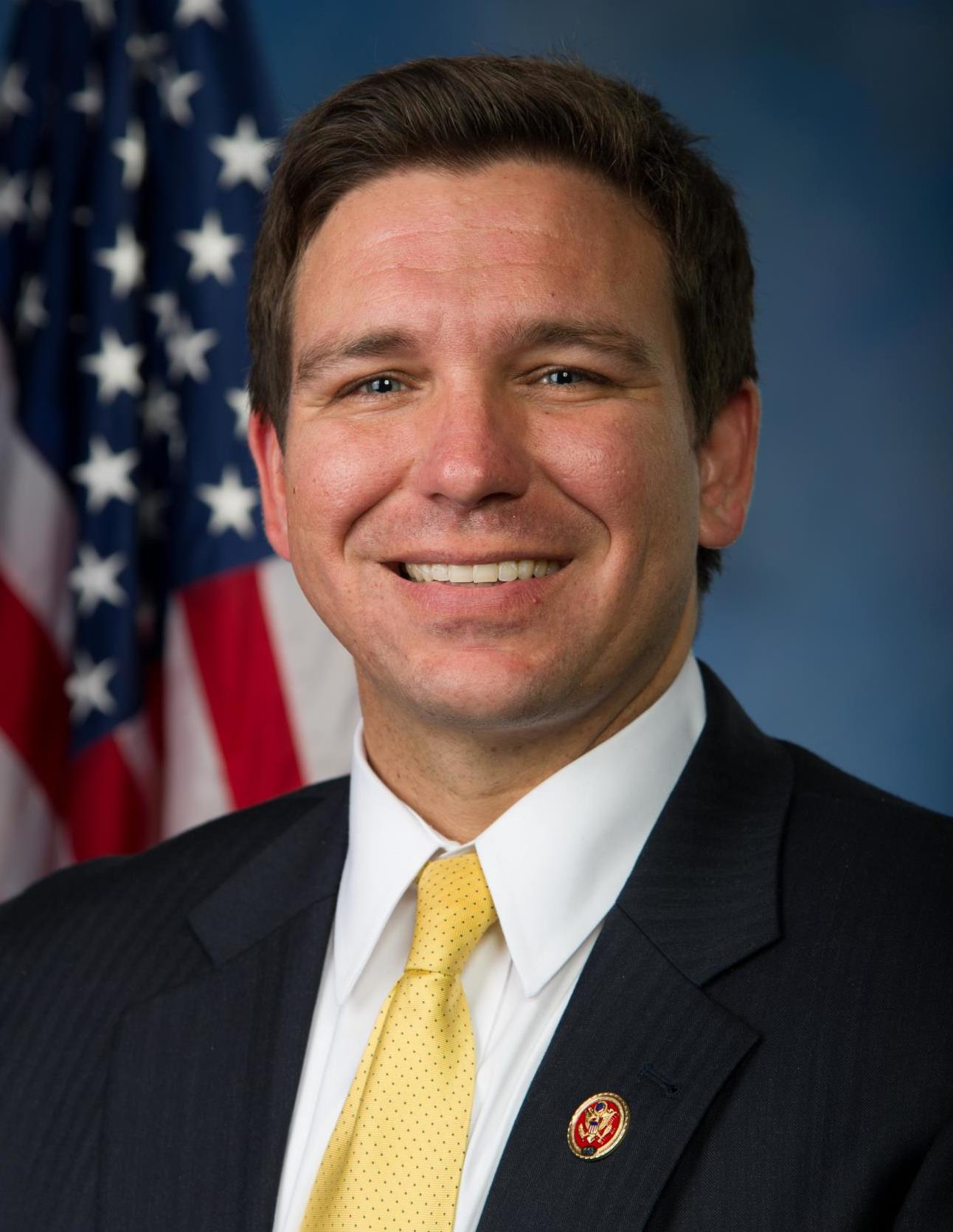
Ron DeSantis's congressional portrait, 2013

In 2012, DeSantis secured a seat in the House of Representatives for Florida's 6th congressional district. He was reelected in 2014 and 2016. DeSantis served on the Committee on Foreign Affairs and the Committee on Oversight and Accountability, chairing the latter's Subcommittee on National Security, the Border and Foreign Affairs. During the 2016 Senate election in Florida, he ran for the seat held by Marco Rubio, who abstained from running for reelection due to his presidential campaign. Following Rubio's withdrawal and subsequent reelection campaign, DeSantis dropped out of the race. In January 2018, DeSantis filed to run for governor of Florida in the state's gubernatorial election to succeed Republican incumbent Rick Scott. Supported by then-president Donald Trump, DeSantis won the Republican primary in August and resigned from Congress in September. DeSantis and his running mate, Jeanette Núñez were confirmed the winners, following a statewide recount that led to Democratic gubernatorial nominee Andrew Gillum conceding. DeSantis signaled his intent to run in the 2022 gubernatorial election in September 2021, launching his reelection bid in November. In a landslide victory, he defeated Democratic nominee Charlie Crist, the governor of Florida from 2007 to 2011.

DeSantis's tenure as the governor of Florida has seen several major developments. The COVID-19 pandemic in Florida began in March 2020; subverting scientific consensus, DeSantis downplayed the effectiveness of face masks against COVID-19 and attempted to reopen Florida while following Trump's advice. He appointed Joseph Ladapo, a noted COVID-19 vaccine skeptic and a signee of the Great Barrington Declaration, as Florida's surgeon general in September 2021, while fining local governments for enforcing vaccine mandates. DeSantis signed the Parental Rights in Education Act in March 2022, prohibiting public schools in Florida from discussing or having classroom instruction on sexual orientation or gender identity from kindergarten through third grade and beginning a feud with The Walt Disney Company. In April 2023, Disney sued DeSantis. DeSantis signed a six-week abortion ban while supporting limited government and taking a hard stance on crime. He downplayed running for president in August 2020, calling the speculation around a potential bid "total garbage".

== Pre-candidacy developments ==
=== Early speculation ===
By January 2021, DeSantis had been a potential candidate in the 2024 presidential election. He was invited to the Republican National Committee's January meeting in Amelia Island, despite supporting then-president Donald Trump at the time. DeSantis's response to the COVID-19 pandemic in Florida elevated him further within the Republican Party; Josh Holmes, an advisor to Senate Minority Leader Mitch McConnell, said that DeSantis was "having a moment with conservatives". In October 2022, former Florida governor Jeb Bush praised DeSantis as a potential 2024 candidate, and in February 2023, repeated his hopes that DeSantis would run, while reserving he was "praising, not endorsing" DeSantis. A Conservative Political Action Conference (CPAC) straw poll saw DeSantis second only to Trump, and the only other Republican to receive double digit polling numbers in the poll. In May, DeSantis spoke to the Republican Party in Allegheny County, Pennsylvania, further fueling speculation of a potential bid, as some Democrats began seeking to mount a campaign against him. Despite various endorsements, he publicly opposed a presidential bid, saying that the discussion over his candidacy was "purely manufactured" in a press conference in September 2021. State straw polls suggested a strong connection with college-educated voters within the Republican Party and narrow victories against Trump.

In conservative media, DeSantis was frequently featured and developed a mutual relationship. In an email obtained by the Tampa Bay Times, a Fox News producer said that he "could host [Fox & Friends]". DeSantis forged alliances with conservative pundits, hosting political commentator Dave Rubin and Newsmax reporter Benny Johnson to the Governor's Mansion in January 2022. In The American Conservative and the National Review, he was lauded as a strong alternative to Trump. As the New York Post and The Wall Street Journal—owned by Rupert Murdoch's News Corp—began to appear critical of Trump for the January 6 Capitol attack, Murdoch's Fox News began shifting coverage to DeSantis and worked with his team to portray him in a positive light; The New York Times journalist Maggie Haberman's book, Confidence Man (2022), states Murdoch was willing to "throw [Trump] over" following his loss in the 2020 presidential election. The New York Post ran the headline, "DeFuture", after DeSantis was reelected, while The Wall Street Journal proclaimed it the "DeSantis Florida tsunami".

DeSantis's speculative campaign was targeted by conspiracy theorists, particularly followers of QAnon. In February 2023, Hungarian-American businessman George Soros expressed his hope that DeSantis would defeat Trump for the Republican nomination, although he qualified this as a hope that such an outcome would result in Trump running as a third-party candidate and splitting the Republican vote rather than a DeSantis presidency, and therefore was not an endorsement. Opponents of DeSantis later seized upon this, putting forward conspiracy theories that DeSantis was "a tool of the Deep State", with "more than 12,000 mentions of 'DeSoros' on social media and news sites" from January to May 2023. Former Arizona gubernatorial candidate Kari Lake falsely claimed that Soros had endorsed DeSantis, which she referred to as "the kiss of death". As speculation continued, Trump mounted attacks against DeSantis, referring to him as "Ron DeSanctimonious" at a rally in Pennsylvania in November 2022, in advance for a presidential campaign. The New York Times reported that Trump has casually used the nickname "Meatball Ron"; DeSantis is Italian-American. Several days after the article was published, Trump said on Truth Social that he "will never call Ron DeSanctimonious 'Meatball' Ron", and that it is "totally inappropriate".

=== Preparing for a run ===
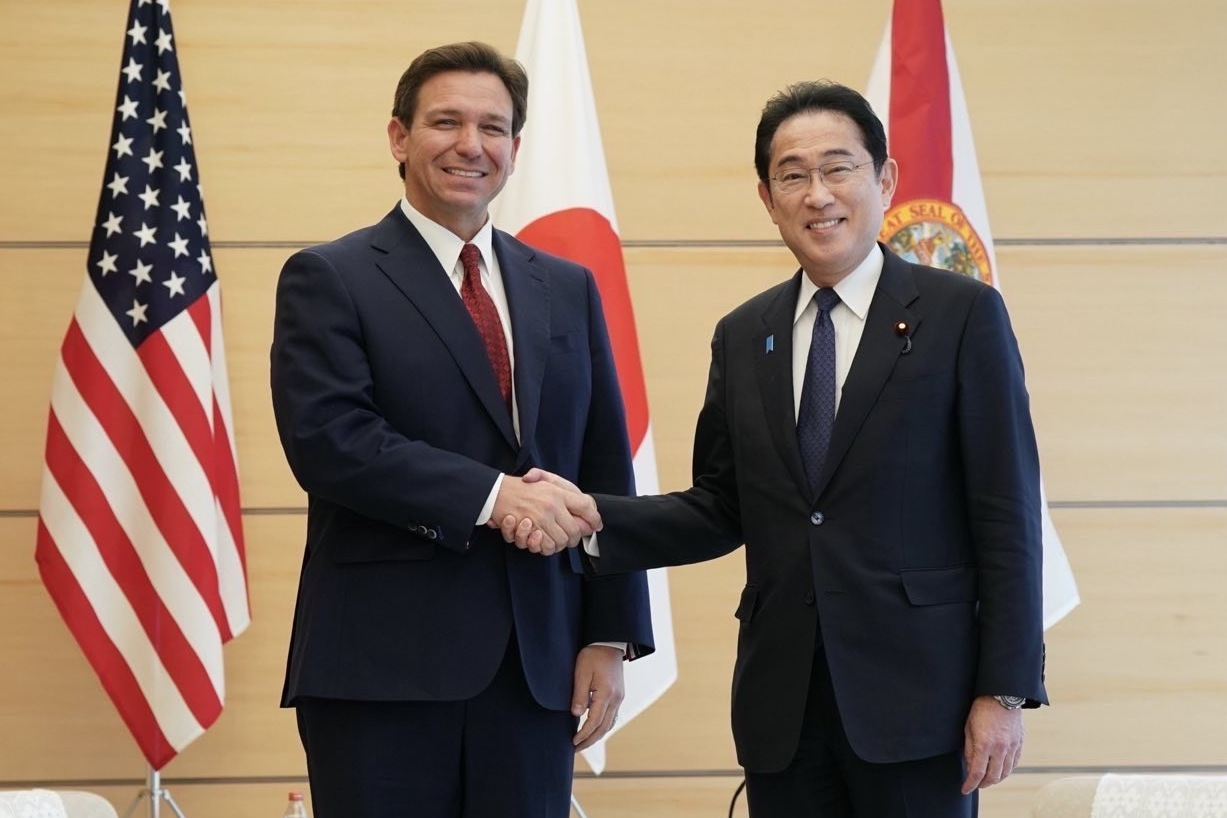
DeSantis's international visits were considered to improve his credentials on foreign policy

In February 2023, DeSantis released The Courage to Be Free, a memoir overviewing his political beliefs, and subsequently embarked on a book tour in the early-voting states of Iowa, New Hampshire, Nevada, and South Carolina, among other states. Despite teasing a potential presidential bid, DeSantis stated that the tour was intended to advocate for his record as the governor of Florida, rather than Trump. In April, he visited Japan, South Korea, Israel, and the United Kingdom, in a move considered to improve his credentials on foreign policy. DeSantis was criticized for an apparent lackluster performance over the course of the trip. According to The Guardian, DeSantis began assembling senior staff on February 27. The Florida Legislature passed an elections bill in April that removes the requirement that DeSantis must resign as the governor of Florida if he launches a presidential campaign. The bill was signed into law by DeSantis hours before he was expected to announce his candidacy. At the end of the Florida legislature session on May 12, DeSantis told reporters that he'll "put up or shut up" on a campaign announcement soon. A person affiliated with DeSantis's campaign told The Hill on May 19 that DeSantis would file paperwork with the Federal Election Commission the following week, and DeSantis's Twitter handle was changed from @RonDeSantisFL to @RonDeSantis on May 23.

Ahead of a potential presidential bid, reports of DeSantis's aloof personality began to form. In the most notable of these instances, The Daily Beast reported in March 2023 that—during a private plane trip in March 2019 from Tallahassee to Washington, D.C.—DeSantis ate a "chocolate pudding dessert" using three fingers, according to two sources. A former staffer told the publication that DeSantis would eat "like a starving animal who has never eaten before" as part of a section about his tenuous social skills. Although he denied the incident, it quickly garnered press attention. A political action committee (PAC) aligned with Trump ran a political message in April titled "Pudding Fingers" and featuring claims DeSantis had made across a backdrop of a man eating pudding with three fingers. Speaking to NBC News, multiple Republican colleagues said that DeSantis was "a loner" who was often seen on his cellphone. The New York Times reported that DeSantis used bike racks to separate himself from the crowd during his visit to Iowa. A video of DeSantis laughing loudly and awkwardly at an Iowa campaign event went viral and drew comparison to the Dean scream, a political gaffe in Howard Dean's 2004 presidential campaign.

Prior to the campaign announcement, allies of DeSantis established a political action committee known as Friends of Ron DeSantis. Although the PAC raised US$86 million, its funds cannot be transferred to Ron DeSantis for President because they were raised under looser laws. On May 15, Friends of Ron DeSantis filed paperwork with the Florida Division of Elections changing its name to "Empower Parents" and devoted its new mission to "protecting parental rights in education", in an apparent effort to distribute the funds and circumvent federal law. The watchdog group Campaign Legal Center has stated that it will file a complaint with the Federal Election Commission if the funds are transferred. Empower Parents may transfer its funds to Never Back Down, a federal super PAC that has raised US$30 million. Never Back Down has run ads in key early-voting states that directly target Trump, and expects to have a budget of US$200 million. The PAC intends to transfer US$80 million from one of DeSantis's political accounts. Although the transfer would have been prevented under state law, the Florida Department of State changed its handbook to allow such a transfer, citing Citizens United v. FEC (2010).

== Campaign ==
=== Announcement ===
Ron DeSantis
(@RonDeSantis)
tweeted:

I'm running for president to lead our Great American Comeback.

May 24, 2023

On May 23, 2023, a campaign insider revealed plans to the Associated Press for DeSantis to announce his candidacy on Twitter Spaces with Twitter CEO Elon Musk at 6:00 p.m. EDT the following day, after meeting with donors at the Four Seasons Hotel Miami. Musk then officially announced the live conversation. Hours before the discussion took place, DeSantis officially filed with the Federal Election Commission (FEC). DeSantis tweeted a launch video minutes before the Twitter Space began. During the call, which attracted over 600,000 Twitter users, technical issues severely affected the announcement as DeSantis was unable to speak for 20 minutes. The Twitter Space was restarted, but lost a significant number of listeners. The conversation was moderated by David Sacks, a confidant of Musk's during his acquisition of Twitter and a Republican donor who praised DeSantis and gave him US$50,000. Following the meeting, DeSantis appeared on Fox News Tonight and spoke to former Republican congressman Trey Gowdy, joking about the technical issues. Protesters gathered at the Four Seasons hotel prior to the DeSantis announcement. Although Sacks claimed that the event was the "biggest room ever held on social media", BuzzFeed's Facebook Live livestream of an exploding watermelon stunt and a livestream of April, a then-pregnant giraffe at the Animal Adventure Park in Harpursville, New York, exceeded it in viewership. An estimated 3.4 million people listened to the interview or a recording of it, according to Twitter. Following the announcement, DeSantis appeared on a variety of conservative media, including Erick Erickson's Erick Erickson Show and The Clay Travis and Buck Sexton Show, suggesting that he would pardon Trump if convicted, as well as participants of the January 6 Capitol attack. On The Ben Shapiro Show, he pledged to repeal the First Step Act, signed by Trump in 2018 at the behest of his son-in-law Jared Kushner. These appearances have antagonized Trump; in his interview with Shapiro, DeSantis criticized Trump for his response to the COVID-19 pandemic.

The technical issues experienced during the Twitter Space overshadowed DeSantis's message. President Joe Biden, who was running for reelection, tweeted "This link works", followed by a link to his own campaign donation. Trump wrote on Truth Social that DeSantis's collar was "too big" in his launch video; he later released a satirical video of a fake Twitter Spaces event, with figures such as George Soros, Klaus Schwab, Adolf Hitler, and the Devil in attendance. Trump followed the video up with another video of a rocket—labeled "Ron 2024", referencing Jeb Bush's 2016 presidential campaign logo—falling over. Both videos appear to be generated by artificial intelligence. Florida representative Matt Gaetz, a prominent Trump ally, tweeted, "DeSedative". Conservative media quickly used the technical issues to lampoon DeSantis. National Review editor Philip Klein called it a disaster, as did Fox News. The Daily Mail ran the headline, "Ron's Desaster"—a term that became a trending hashtag on Twitter—while Breitbart News called it a "DeBacle for DeSantis". Conversely, conservative commentator Ben Shapiro wrote that those concerned about the "optics of the Twitter Spaces glitch" are unlikely to vote for DeSantis. Musk positioned the discussion as a success, pointing to media coverage of its failure. DeSantis's campaign later released a statement clarifying that the issues experienced during the Twitter Space were due to an influx of people listening to the audio discussion at once; campaign spokesperson Dave Abrams called it "Internet-breaking excitement." According to The New York Times, employees had not run a stress test beforehand. The Tampa Bay Times attributed the lack of a response from late-night talk show hosts, such as Stephen Colbert and John Oliver, to the 2023 Writers Guild of America strike.

=== Initial stages and opposition ===
On May 30, DeSantis held his first in-person event at Eternity Church in Clive, Iowa, in a decision considered by the Associated Press to strengthen his connection with evangelical Christian voters. He subsequently appeared in other cities across Iowa, including Sioux City, Council Bluffs, Pella, and concluding his visit in Cedar Rapids. In a Fox & Friends interview, DeSantis called Iowa "very important" and drew parallels to the six-week abortion ban he signed into law with Iowa's. The event was part of a tri-state tour billed the "Great American Comeback Tour", in which he would visit twelve cities in the United States, including those in the key early voting states of New Hampshire and South Carolina. During his visit to New Hampshire, DeSantis sparred with an Associated Press reporter in Laconia, asking him, "Are you blind?" The incident attracted media attention; Never Back Down framed it as an instance of him shutting down "fake news". In Manchester, DeSantis was met by reproductive rights protesters. On June 7, DeSantis visited the Mexico–United States border in Arizona, meeting Cochise County sheriff Mark Dannels. Simultaneously, he began a US$100 million door-knocking effort. The DeSantis campaign established a boot camp—referred to by allies as "Fort Benning"—to encourage canvassing efforts. DeSantis fielded questions at a town hall event in New Hampshire on June 27. In a pluvial event, DeSantis marched in an Independence Day parade in New Hampshire. DeSantis's wife, Casey DeSantis, announced she would launch a grassroots group called "Mamas for DeSantis" with Iowa governor Kim Reynolds days after DeSantis and Trump crossed paths at a Moms for Liberty convention. In a subsequent video, she called for mothers to mobilize to "protect the innocence of our children and to protect the rights of parents". DeSantis made her first independent appearance on July 6 with Reynolds. Through her words—both privately and publicly, Reynolds has created an environment that has favored DeSantis, drawing ire from Trump. Trump attacked Reynolds and will skip out on a gathering in Des Moines, Iowa, for The Family Leader hosted by politician Bob Vander Plaats, to which DeSantis came to her defense and indirectly told him, "Nobody is entitled to this nomination", on The Howie Carr Show.

This is a war of a certain kind, and what you do is, generally speaking, the person that's in second place, you go after that person as opposed to the person in eighth or ninth place.

— Trump explaining his feud with DeSantis

The Trump campaign sought to directly attack DeSantis, with the two campaigns often employing imagery generated by artificial intelligence (AI) or other synthetic media. Days after DeSantis announced his candidacy, prominent Trump allies—such as his son, Donald Trump Jr.—shared a scene of The Office episode "The Negotiation" with DeSantis's face digitally imposed onto Michael Scott's face; the scene involved a meeting with Scott and Darryl Philbin in which Scott wears a women's suit and is called out for it. Shortly thereafter, the DeSantis campaign used a sequence of images featuring Trump with former National Institute of Allergy and Infectious Diseases director Anthony Fauci in a campaign commercial. While some of the images are real, the DeSantis campaign interspersed the sequence with AI-generated images of Trump kissing and hugging Fauci, as first noted by Agence France-Presse. Congresspersons and Trump allies JD Vance and Marjorie Taylor Greene criticized the advertisement, with Greene asking for its removal. Rapid response director Christina Pushaw posted an AI-generated image of DeSantis riding a rhinoceros, referencing the pejorative term Republican in Name Only (RINO). Despite remaining allies during the COVID-19 pandemic, Trump and DeSantis disagreed with each other's handling of the pandemic. Trump has released advertisements with DeSantis—dubbed "Lockdown Ron"—issuing stay-at-home orders. The two men's feud extended into Never Back Down mockingly following Trump in a bus. In a series of Truth Social posts, Trump claimed that DeSantis is attempting to "get out" of the 2024 presidential election. Trump launched a "Farmers for Trump" coalition in June, criticizing DeSantis's stance on the Renewable Fuel Standard and questioning his support for the agricultural industry, particularly in Iowa. DeSantis also faced opposition from Rupert Murdoch's media outlets. Fox News's Will Cain and Maria Bartiromo questioned DeSantis on the vitality of his campaign, while The Wall Street Journal criticized him for an immigration bill he signed in May and the New York Post covered his campaign struggles.

During Pride Month, his campaign shared an ad described as both homophobic and homoerotic, which criticized Trump for his supportive comments toward LGBT rights during the 2016 presidential campaign. The DeSantis ad contrasts Trump's comments with news headlines about DeSantis' anti-LGBT policies, interwoven with a "jarring series" of clips, including a heavily muscled man known as Gigachad, images of DeSantis shooting lasers out of his eyes, obscure right-wing memes, and movie clips of Patrick Bateman in American Psycho, Jordan Belfort in The Wolf of Wall Street, and Achilles in Troy, who is often depicted as a gay man in Ancient Greek literature. The video was criticized by many Democrats and Republicans. In response, DeSantis doubled down on his criticism of Trump as a "pioneer in injecting gender ideology into the mainstream". The video was removed from Twitter on July 7 for copyright violations. According to The New York Times, the video was produced by a DeSantis staffer and handed off to a supporter, to make the ad appear independent of the campaign.

=== First campaign reset ===
In July, two senior advisors left the DeSantis campaign to work on an outside campaign effort. Amid financial issues, the campaign let go fewer than ten aides involved in event planning, according to Politico, leaving the campaign with at least 90 employees. Never Back Down has received résumés from the laid off staffers. In a perceived slight towards Trump's comments at a Dairy Queen in Council Bluffs, Iowa, in which he asked what a Blizzard was, DeSantis visited a Dairy Queen and ordered a Blizzard. He did not appear at the Turning Point Action Conference that month, in contrast with Trump, who dismissed his candidacy and seized on his absence. Campaign press secretary Bryan Griffin stated that DeSantis was instead in Iowa and spoke at the Tennessee Republican Party Statesman's Dinner. According to organizers, he declined to speak at the conference. Other speakers at the event—such as representatives Matt Gaetz, Byron Donalds, and Anna Paulina Luna—supported Trump. At a fundraising event in Ankeny, Iowa, DeSantis told reporters that he would consider Kim Reynolds as a potential vice president if he wins the Republican nomination. DeSantis scaled back his travel schedule to prioritize early voting states and focusing on media interviews, including an interview with CNN's Jake Tapper on The Lead with Jake Tapper, marking the first time he has appeared on a non-conservative outlet. Griffin told the New York Post that the DeSantis campaign prioritizes fundraising over media attention, chiding mainstream media. The campaign's acceptance of the mainstream media is a departure from the isolationist strategy seen in the days following DeSantis's announcement that was once described as a "safe space" by Axios.

DeSantis became the first major candidate to file in South Carolina, but that day his campaign events in Tega Cay and West Columbia were overshadowed by news that Jack Smith was advancing the investigation into the January 6 Capitol attack by naming Trump as a target. That month, Never Back Down ran a political advertisement that—while using a post written by him on Truth Social—used an audio deepfake of Trump as part of an Iowa advertisement buy worth at least US$1 million. Trump campaign senior adviser Chris LaCivita criticized the use of artificial intelligence in the advertisement. According to NBC News, DeSantis will run as an insurgent rather than an incumbent governor and will lean less into his governorship as a whole. He appeared at the Utah State Capitol with Utah governor Spencer Cox, where he appealed to the state's evangelical base. Later that month, Politico reported that DeSantis had cut his campaign staff by a third, or the jobs of 38 aides, signaling a need to rein in funding. On the same day, he was involved in a car crash at approximately 8:15 a.m in Chattanooga, Tennessee, that lightly injured one aide, and on the same day as a donor retreat in Park City, Utah. A pro-DeSantis Twitter account received criticism for posting a video that depicted a Sonnenrad, a symbol used by neo-Nazis, in the video's background. The video was retweeted by a DeSantis campaign staffer but was eventually deleted after massive criticism and backlash. The campaign aide who had retweeted the video was dismissed after it drew public criticism, but subsequent reporting indicated that the video’s creation involved multiple members of the campaign’s online media team. It was later revealed that the DeSantis campaign was directly involved in the creation of this and similar "meme videos", after chat logs from a campaign "war room" were revealed by Semafor. On August 8, DeSantis replaced campaign manager Generra Peck with James Uthmeier. Peck became the chief strategist.

=== Second campaign reset ===
DeSantis reset his campaign for a second time on August 11. The following day, DeSantis attended the Iowa State Fair, but his presence was interrupted by Trump's arrival. A memo from Never Back Down released that month suggested that then-candidate Vivek Ramaswamy would implement the caste system in the United States, viewing Ramaswamy as an opponent gaining in strength. Republican consulting firm Axiom Strategies released hundreds of advice, memos, and polling information online, revealing that DeSantis's debate strategy is to "take a sledgehammer" to Ramaswamy and attack Biden, but defend Trump in absentia. DeSantis distanced himself from the documents, claiming that he had not read them; following the advice would be perceived as having no control over his campaign. At a speech in New Hampshire, DeSantis adjusted his approach to appear more personal, offering an anecdote about going to Fenway Park while on the Yale Bulldogs baseball team. Later that month, DeSantis received criticism from Trump supporters for referring to them as "listless vessels".

=== Iowa caucus and withdrawal ===
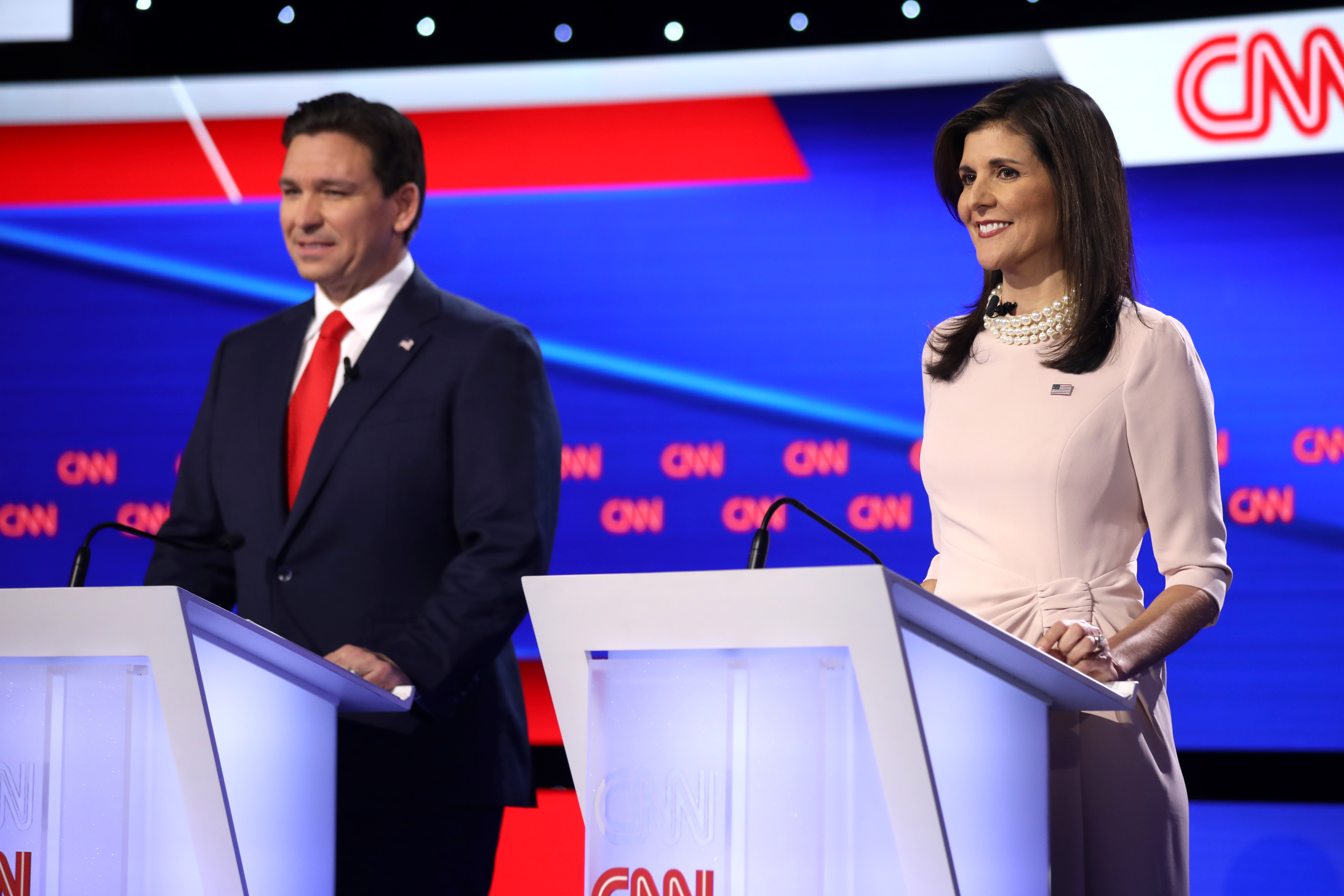
Ron DeSantis and Nikki Haley at the CNN Republican Presidential Debate in Des Moines, Iowa.

The 2024 Iowa Republican presidential caucuses were held on January 15, 2024. DeSantis placed second, winning 21.23% of the vote and 9 delegates, losing to Trump by a 30-point margin. Analysts described the results as heavily damaging DeSantis's campaign.

On January 21, 2024, DeSantis suspended his campaign prior to the New Hampshire Republican presidential primary, endorsing Trump. Prior to his announcement, The New York Times had reported that DeSantis was expected to withdraw his candidacy. According to a donor, DeSantis lacked financial support. The Trump campaign was aware that DeSantis was tendering a campaign suspension but did not expect him to endorse Trump. Candidate Nikki Haley said DeSantis ran a "great race" and she wished him well. Her campaign said it did not expect her chances to be affected by DeSantis's withdrawal.

DeSantis got 353,615 or 1.6% votes during the whole 2024 Republican Party presidential primaries.

== Financials ==
=== Fundraising ===
The DeSantis campaign announced that DeSantis raised a total of US$8.2 million from online donations and donations made at the Four Seasons Miami, outpacing Trump, who had raised US$9.5 million in the six weeks after he announced his campaign. His campaign was also supported by Bigelow Aerospace founder Robert Bigelow, whose US$20 million donation to Never Back Down is one of the largest of a single donor in a presidential primary. In a USA Today interview, donors expressed indifference for DeSantis's declining poll numbers, comparing it to a marathon. The donor network of Charles Koch, one of the biggest spenders in American politics, considered supporting DeSantis, but early campaign stumbles dissuaded Koch. Never Back Down raised an "unprecedented" US$500,000 through the Draft DeSantis 2024 Fund in the days following DeSantis's announcement. By July 6, the DeSantis campaign had raised US$20 million, while Never Back Down touted that it had raised US$130 million. According to a campaign finance disclosure that month, a majority of the money earned by the campaign came from donors who gave the legal maximum, suggesting potential long term solvency issues. To reach these donors, DeSantis used private planes, cutting into his funding. The report shows funding slowed down after he announced his candidacy.

In fundraising emails, DeSantis has focused on culture war issues—such as transgender men getting pregnant—with his emails mentioning "woke" more than any other Republican candidate. Seeking to contrast him with Trump, the DeSantis campaign has sought to avoid the beseeching undertone present in many of Trump's fundraising emails. DeSantis's campaign website promises to avoid "smoke and mirrors" and unrealistic donation matching promises. His advisors have argued that transparency with donors could effectively counter the advantage Democratic candidates have had with ActBlue, an online fundraising software, while its Republican alternative, WinRed, was created 15 years later; Never Back Down chief operating officer Kristin Davison stated that a challenge for Republicans is "building out the small-dollar universe". DeSantis's approach has been tried by senator Bernie Sanders, who utilized grassroots donors in his 2016 and 2020 presidential campaigns. Despite this, he has siphoned off former Trump donors, earning more than twice as much from former donors than Nikki Haley; nearly half of all total donations came from precincts that supported Democrat Joe Biden in 2020.

Never Back Down has taken aggressive measures to attract door knockers in a mass national canvassing measure. By July 2023, the organization had an estimated 350 to 400 canvassers, according to Davison. The PAC's canvassing efforts contrast with traditional presidential field organizing efforts, which typically use volunteers. Never Back Down tracks canvassers through an app and must write down their interactions with voters. Although door knockers are reportedly trained and vetted, The Washington Post obtained several videos from Ring doorbells. In one video, a cannabis intoxicated canvasser used "lewd remarks", leading to his firing. Virginia representative Barbara Comstock spoke critically of this practice, stating that campaigns want volunteers who are local and well-versed in the politics of the state. Door knockers are trained at a facility in west Des Moines, Iowa, known as "Fort Benning", where they are coached to avoid reporters and Trump supporters and respect "no trespassing" signs but not "no soliciting" signs. They are managed by subcontractors, including Vanguard Field Strategies, a subsidiary of Axiom Strategies, whose founder—Jeff Roe—is the chief strategist for Never Back Down.

In August 2023, financial filings revealed that Never Back Down had US$97 million in cash on hand and spent US$34 million. The filings show a reliance on wealthy donors, including Bigelow.

=== Legality ===
In May 2023, NBC News reported that staff for the DeSantis administration sent text messages soliciting donations from Florida lobbyists, a potentially legally strenuous maneuver. During a campaign effort in the border city of Eagle Pass, Texas, DeSantis shared a photo op of himself posing in front of a helicopter on Twitter. Although the photo was intended to boost his campaign, DeSantis received criticism when The Daily Beast stated that the helicopter was taxpayer-funded. The publication also noted that DeSantis took a tour of the Rio Grande on a boat owned by the Florida Fish and Wildlife Conservation Commission as part of Operation Lone Star, accompanied by a Fox News reporter; The New York Times confirmed the boat's status. The Federal Election Commission requires candidates to reimburse government entities when using aircraft given to them. In July, NBC News obtained a confidential campaign memo intended to quell donor concerns; the memo shows that DeSantis is focusing on early voting states and that he views only former President Donald Trump as a significant threat.

== Polling and endorsements ==
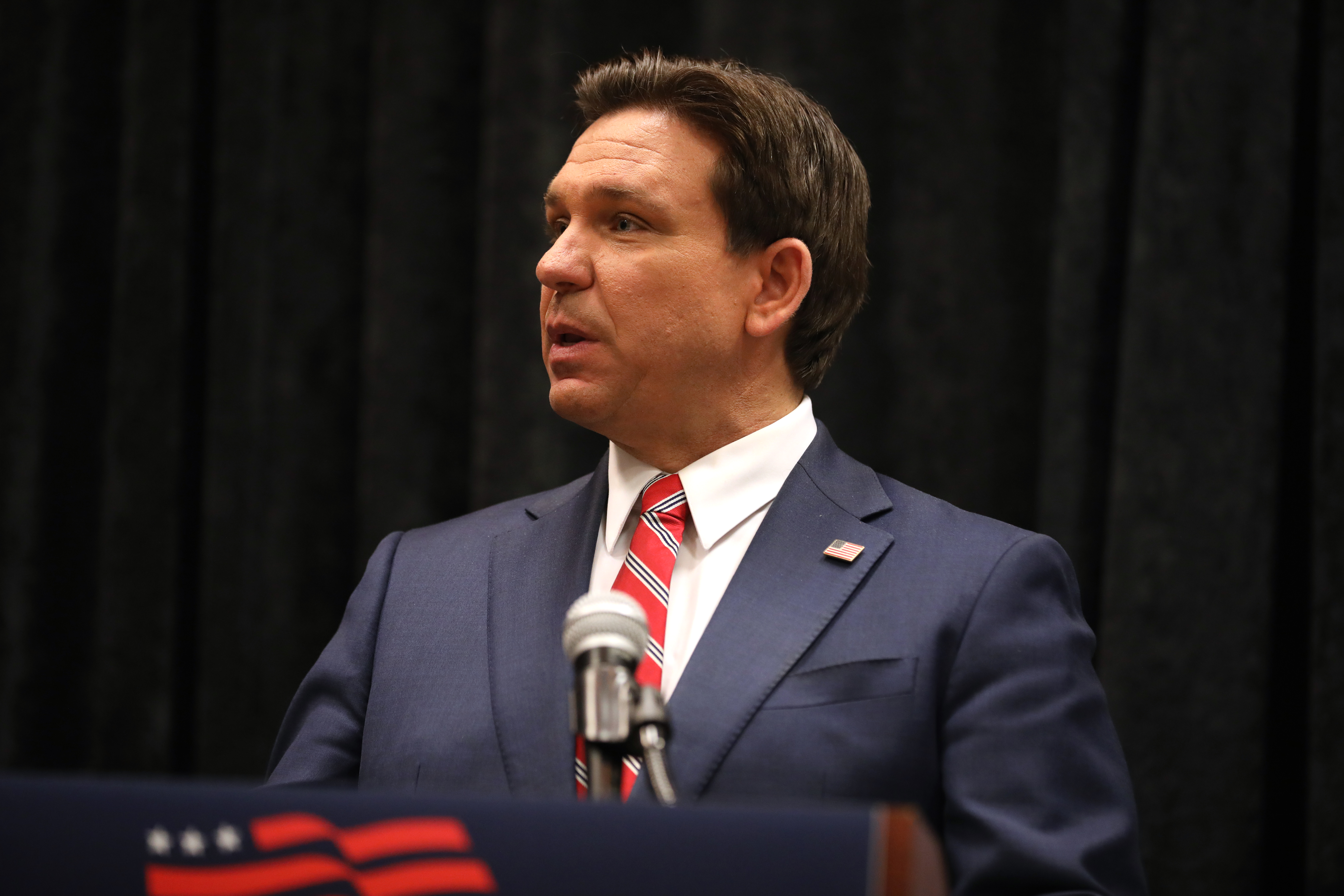
DeSantis in West Des Moines, Iowa, January 9, 2024.

Although DeSantis initially faced competitive support to Trump according to aggregate FiveThirtyEight polls, the margin between Trump and DeSantis increased over the course of 2023. According to the Quinnipiac University Polling Institute between May 18 to 22, DeSantis attracted 25% of Republican voters compared to Trump's 56% hold. FiveThirtyEight's Geoffrey Skelley noted Trump's rise in the time between November 2022, when he declared his candidacy, and May 2023. In that time, Trump was able to attack DeSantis for following many of the beliefs established by the Freedom Caucus, which he co-founded. Trump convinced many Florida congressional Republicans to back him and garnered endorsements, and his indictment bolstered his ratings. In April 2023, DeSantis signed a six-week abortion ban, which led Republican megadonors to worry that he had shifted too far to the right.

Trump's presence in the 2024 Republican Party presidential primaries and his core followers, as well as an increasing field, presented challenges for the DeSantis campaign. Ryan Tyson, a senior advisor to DeSantis, said that the campaign seeks to accrue voters who will neither vote exclusively for Trump nor identify with the Never Trump movement. According to Tyson, additional entrants split up the Never Trump electorate. Other candidates, such as Nikki Haley and Vivek Ramaswamy, have focused on attacking DeSantis rather than Trump; Ramaswamy dined with Trump and his son-in-law Jared Kushner—a close friend of Ramaswamy—at Trump's property in Bedminster, New Jersey, in 2021. Following Trump's second indictment, DeSantis fell nine percent in the RealClearPolitics national average. Former Trump advisor and Never Back Down spokesperson Steve Cortes called Trump the "runaway frontrunner" and admitted to being "way behind." Despite the field thinning out with Burgum, Pence, and Scott dropping out, DeSantis struggled to consolidate those supporters. Additionally, as the field thinned, Haley rose to challenge DeSantis, both nationally and in the early states.

Local regression graph of all polls conducted since January 2023.

== See also ==
- List of Ron DeSantis 2024 presidential campaign endorsements
