= A. Carville Foster =

American politician (1932–2022)

A. Carville Foster, Jr.

Member of the Pennsylvania House of Representatives from the 93rd district
- In office January 4, 1973 – November 30, 1992
- Preceded by: Raymond L. Hovis
- Succeeded by: Mike Waugh

Personal details
- Born: October 21, 1932 Parkton, Maryland, U.S.
- Died: September 20, 2022 (aged 89) Dallastown, Pennsylvania
- Party: Republican

A. Carville Foster, Jr. (October 21, 1932 –September 20, 2022) was an American politician and Republican member of the Pennsylvania House of Representatives. Foster died on September 20, 2022, at the age of 89.
