= Ray Shearer =

American baseball player (1929-1982)

- Ray Shearer
- Outfielder
- Born: September 19, 1929; Jacobus, Pennsylvania, U.S.
- Died: February 21, 1982 (aged 52); York, Pennsylvania, U.S.
- Batted: Right Threw: Right

MLB debut
- September 18, 1957, for the Milwaukee Braves

Last MLB appearance
- September 29, 1957, for the Milwaukee Braves

MLB statistics
- Games played: 2
- At bats: 2
- Hits: 1
- Stats at Baseball Reference

Teams
- Milwaukee Braves (1957)

Ray Solomon Shearer (September 19, 1929 – February 21, 1982) was an American professional baseball player. He played in two Major League Baseball games for the Milwaukee Braves in 1957, one as a left fielder and the other as a pinch hitter.

== Early career ==
Born in Jacobus, Pennsylvania, Shearer was signed by the Brooklyn Dodgers before the 1950 season and had a big year in his first season in pro ball, hitting .317 for the Sheboygan Indians and leading the class D Wisconsin State League with 30 home runs and 137 RBIs. He spent the next eight seasons (1950–57) in the minors, hitting over .300 three different times with double-digit figures in home runs seven of those years. The Dodgers traded Shearer to the Milwaukee Braves for Jim Frey on July 4, 1956.

== 1957: MLB cup of coffee ==
Shearer played for the Wichita Braves of the American Association in 1957, hitting .316 with 29 home runs in 138 games. He was given a late-season promotion to the majors, and made his MLB debut on September 18, with the Milwaukee Braves. He started the game in left field for the Braves who were hosting the New York Giants. In his first plate appearance, Shearer struck out against Johnny Antonelli. He walked in his second plate appearance before being lifted for a pinch-hitter in the sixth inning.

=== Moment in the spotlight ===
On September 29, on the final day of the 1957 season in front of 45,000 fans at County Stadium, Shearer helped the Milwaukee Braves to a come-from-behind victory. The Braves, who had already clinched the pennant, were trailing the Cincinnati Redlegs 3–2 in bottom of the ninth inning when Joe Adcock led off the inning with a base hit off new Redlegs' pitcher Bill Kennedy. The Braves brought in Mel Roach to pinch run for Adcock, and Del Crandall to pinch-hit for pitcher Don McMahon. After Crandall flied out to center field, Shearer was brought in to pinch-hit for catcher Carl Sawatski. Shearer came through with a single to right field advancing Roach to third base with the tying run, and becoming the potential winning run on first base.

Andy Pafko struck out against Kennedy for the second out of the inning, bringing up Red Schoendienst, who kept the inning alive with another single, his league-leading 200th hit of the year, advancing Shearer to second base while Roach scored the tying run. Light-hitting shortstop Félix Mantilla then came to bat and drove a single to left field, scoring Shearer and giving the Braves a 4–3 victory for their 95th win. Shearer's base hit was the only one for the 28-year-old outfielder, giving him a lifetime .500 batting average in the major leagues. It was also Kennedy's final major league appearance.

== Return to the minors ==
After his late season call-up to County Stadium in Milwaukee in 1957, his only shot at the big leagues, Shearer spent the rest of his career in the minors, playing five more seasons, all in class A ball or better. He played with teams like the Nashville Vols, Atlanta Crackers, Louisville Colonels and Richmond Virginians and finished out his 13-season minor league run in 1962 with the York White Roses and the Augusta Yankees. Shearer was 32 years old when he left baseball and had put together a minor league stat sheet with a .288 average and 204 home runs while appearing in 1,614 games.

Shearer died in York, Pennsylvania at the age of 52.
