= Senator Beers =

Senator Beers may refer to:

- Bob Beers (politician, born 1959), Nevada State Senate
- George D. Beers (1812–1880), New York State Senate
- Robert O. Beers (1916–2005), Pennsylvania State Senate
- Seth Preston Beers (1781–1863), Connecticut State Senate
