= Kristin Phillips-Hill =

American politician

Member of the Pennsylvania Senate from the 28th district
- Incumbent
- Assumed office January 1, 2019
- Preceded by: Scott Wagner

Member of the Pennsylvania House of Representatives from the 93rd district
- In office January 6, 2015 – January 1, 2019
- Preceded by: Ron Miller
- Succeeded by: Mike Jones

Personal details
- Born: December 2, 1965 (age 60) Camden, New Jersey
- Party: Republican
- Spouse: Richard
- Children: Victoria, Gavin, Spencer
- Education: Rutgers University (BA in Political Science); Rutgers University, Eagleton Institute of Politics (MA in Public Policy)
- Occupation: Small business owner, Legislative aide
- Website: Official website

Kristin Lee Phillips-Hill is a member of the Pennsylvania State Senate, representing the 28th Senate district. Prior to being elected to the Senate, she was a member of the Pennsylvania House of Representatives, representing the 93rd House district in York County, Pennsylvania from 2015 to 2019. Before entering state politics, she was a member of the Dallastown Area School Board from 2011 to 2014.

Born in Camden, New Jersey, she graduated in 1984 from Cinnaminson High School.

For the 2025-2026 Session, Phillips-Hill serves as the Majority Caucus Chair and sits on the following committees:

- Communications & Technology (Vice Chair)
- Appropriations
- Banking & Insurance
- Consumer Protection & Professional Licensure
- State Government

== Electoral history ==
PA House election, 2014: Republican Primary, District 93
Party	Candidate	Votes	%
Republican	Kristin Phillips-Hill	2,564	53.27
Republican	Ernie Merisotis	2,233	46.40
Total votes		4,797	100.00

PA House election, 2014: Pennsylvania House, District 93
Party	Candidate	Votes	%
Republican	Kristin Phillips-Hill	Unopposed	
Total votes		16,031	100.00
Republican hold			

PA House election, 2016: Pennsylvania House, District 93
Party	Candidate	Votes	%
Republican	Kristin Phillips-Hill	Unopposed	
Total votes		26,741	100.00
Republican hold			

2018 Pennsylvania Senate election: Republican Primary, District 28
Party	Candidate	Votes	%
Republican	Kristin Phillips-Hill	14,294	65.42
Republican	Julie Dietz Wheeler	7,556	34.58
Total votes		21,850	100.00

2018 Pennsylvania Senate election: District 28
Party	Candidate	Votes	%
Republican	Kristin Phillips-Hill	62,380	62.62
Democratic	Judith Higgins	37,105	37.25
Total votes		99,485	100.00
Republican hold			
