= Never Back Down Inc. =

Super PAC for Ron DeSantis's 2024 campaign

- Legal status: Super PAC
- Leader: Ken Cuccinelli; Chris Jankowski; Kristin Davison; Scott Wagner

Never Back Down Inc. is a Super PAC which supported Ron DeSantis in his campaign for the 2024 Republican presidential nomination. According to OpenSecrets, the Super PAC raised $145,709,450.

== Description ==
Never Back Down began as a Super PAC to draft Ron DeSantis to compete for the Republican presidential nomination. It was established by Ken Cuccinelli in February 2023. Cabell Hobbs was its treasurer, and Republican political consultant Jeff Roe was the Super PAC's chief strategist. It reportedly raised $30 million between March 9 and April 3 2023, but later filings showed they had only raised $23 million, primarily from Robert Bigelow.

As of April 3, 2023 the Super PAC also employed Republican political consultant and strategist Jeff Roe. By May 24, New Back Down had reportedly raised $40 million and was being "helm[ed]" by Roe, with Chris Jankowski as its chief executive officer, Adam Laxalt as its chairman, and Kristin Davison as its chief operating officer. At the end of June 2023 the group and had receive donations of over $1 million from seven donors and had $97 million cash on hand, including $82.5 million which had been transferred from Empower Parents PAC, DeSantis' state-level PAC.

The Campaign Legal Center filed a complaint with the Federal Election Commission in December 2023 which argued that the transfer of funds from the state committee violated the Federal Election Campaign Act.

CEO Chris Jankowski resigned his position on November 22, 2023 after disagreements on strategy with Roe and Scott Wagner, a board member of the organization, and was replaced by Davison. Laxalt resigned as chairman on November 26 and was replaced by Wagner, while Roe resigned on December 16. Davison was fired as CEO after holding the position for nine days, and was also replaced by Wagner.

== Activities ==
In May 2023, Never Back Down- (separate entities with no ties to NBDLLC or NBD INC) outlined a plan to spend $200 million in support of DeSantis candidacy and planned to have a staff of 2,600 field organizers active by Labor Day, which was described by the New York Times as "an extraordinary number of people for even the best-funded campaigns".

By August 2023, the New York Times reported that the Super PAC "[wasn't] just supplementing the campaign’s work; it [had] taken over nearly every aspect of the DeSantis campaign."

The New York Times reported in February 2024 that Never Back Down spent $130 million on DeSantis' campaign, which OpenSecrets reports a total expenditure of over $145 million.
