= Dan Delp =

American politician

Daniel S. Delp

Member of the Pennsylvania Senate from the 28th district
- In office January 3, 1995 – November 30, 1998
- Preceded by: Michael E. Bortner
- Succeeded by: Mike Waugh

Personal details
- Born: December 26, 1964 (age 61) York, Pennsylvania
- Party: Republican
- Education: Lebanon Valley College; Penn State-Reading
- Occupation: Businessman, State Senator

Daniel S. Delp (born December 26, 1964) was a Republican member of the Pennsylvania State Senate for the 28th District from 1995 to 1998.

== Life ==
Born in York, Pennsylvania on December 26, 1964, Delp earned a degree in chemistry from Lebanon Valley College and an engineering degree from Penn State-Reading. Delp was elected to represent the state's 28th senatorial district in 1994.

He did not run for re-election in 1998 after he was prosecuted for hiring an underage prostitute and buying her alcohol with his Senate expense account.
