= Ralph Hess =

American politician

Ralph W. Hess

Member of the Pennsylvania Senate from the 28th district
- In office January 3, 1971 – November 30, 1990
- Preceded by: Robert O. Beers
- Succeeded by: Michael Bortner

Personal details
- Born: December 25, 1939 (age 86) Fawn Grove, Pennsylvania

Ralph W. Hess (born December 25, 1939) is a former member of the Pennsylvania State Senate, serving from 1971 to 1990.
