= Raymond Hovis =

American politician

Raymond Leader Hovis

Member of the Pennsylvania House of Representatives from the 93rd district
- In office November, 1969 – November 30, 1972
- Preceded by: Harold B. Rudisill
- Succeeded by: Carville Foster

Personal details
- Born: January 13, 1934 (age 92) Phoenixville, Pennsylvania
- Party: Democratic

Raymond L. Hovis (born January 13, 1934) is a former Democratic member of the Pennsylvania House of Representatives.
