= Ron Miller (Pennsylvania politician) =

Pennsylvania politician

Ronald E. Miller

Member of the Pennsylvania House of Representatives from the 93rd district
- In office January 5, 1999 – January 6, 2015
- Preceded by: Michael L. Waugh
- Succeeded by: Kristin Phillips-Hill

Personal details
- Born: September 20, 1951 (age 75) York, Pennsylvania
- Party: Republican
- Spouse: Catherine Miller
- Education: Mansfield University
- Website: www.repmiller.com

Ronald E. Miller (born September 20, 1951) is a Republican former member of the Pennsylvania House of Representatives for the 93rd District and was elected in 1998. He served on the House Appropriations, Transportation and Veterans Affairs and Emergency Preparedness Committees.

== Personal ==
He was raised in Loganville and graduated from Dallastown Area High School. He later attended the Mansfield University of Pennsylvania, where he earned a bachelor of science degree in secondary education. He and his wife live in Jacobus.
