= Mike Waugh =

American politician

Michael L. Waugh
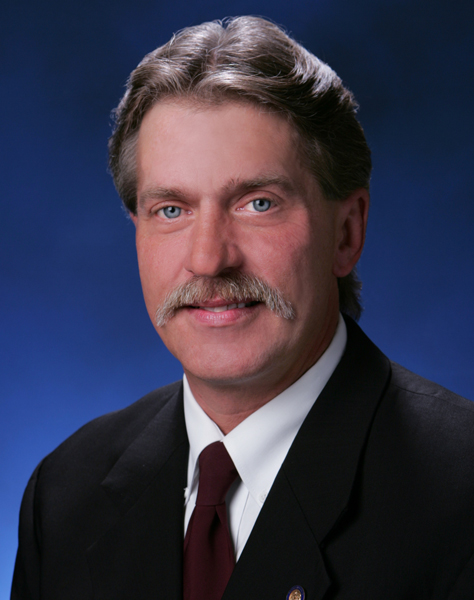

Member of the Pennsylvania Senate from the 28th district
- In office January 5, 1999 – January 13, 2014
- Preceded by: Daniel S. Delp
- Succeeded by: Scott Wagner

Member of the Pennsylvania House of Representatives from the 93rd district
- In office January 5, 1993 – November 25, 1998
- Preceded by: Carville Foster
- Succeeded by: Ron Miller

Personal details
- Born: December 17, 1955 York, Pennsylvania
- Died: October 8, 2014 (aged 58) Glen Rock, Pennsylvania
- Party: Republican
- Spouse: Wanda C. Waugh
- Education: Penn State York
- Occupation: General contractor

Michael L. Waugh (December 17, 1955 – October 8, 2014) was an American politician who served a Republican member of the Pennsylvania State Senate for the 28th District from 1998 until 2014. Prior to this, Waugh was a member of the Pennsylvania House of Representatives from 1993 through 1998.

Waugh resigned from the State Senate on January 13, 2014, following a cancer diagnosis. He accepted an appointment by Governor Corbett as executive director of the Pennsylvania Farm Show Complex & Expo Center, but died due to the disease on October 8, 2014.
