= Harold Rudisill =

American politician

Harold B. Rudisill

Member of the Pennsylvania House of Representatives from the 93rd district
- In office January 7, 1969 – May 18, 1969
- Preceded by: District Created
- Succeeded by: Raymond L. Hovis

Member of the Pennsylvania House of Representatives from the York County district
- In office 1955–1968

Personal details
- Born: May 14, 1898 Hanover, Pennsylvania
- Died: May 18, 1969 (aged 71) Hanover, Pennsylvania
- Party: Democratic

Harold B. Rudisill (May 14, 1898 – May 18, 1969) was a Democratic member of the Pennsylvania House of Representatives. He graduated from Gettysburg College in 1920, where he was a member of Tau Kappa Epsilon fraternity.
