= Dallastown Area High School =

Coordinates: 39.893°N 76.653°W

- 700 New School Lane; Dallastown, Pennsylvania 17313; United States

Information
- Motto: Dedication to Excellence
- Opened: September 1, 1958
- School district: Dallastown Area School District
- Principal: Misty Wilson
- Teaching staff: 118.13 (FTE)
- Grades: 9-12
- Enrollment: 2,012 (2023-2024)
- Student to teacher ratio: 17.03
- Colors: Blue & white
- Athletics conference: YAIAA Division I
- Mascot: Wildcat
- Newspaper: The Beacon
- Yearbook: The Spectator
- Website: hs.dallastown.net

Dallastown Area High School is a high school in the Dallastown Area School District. The school is located at 700 New School Lane, Dallastown, Pennsylvania in York County, Pennsylvania. Dallastown Area High School is commonly referred to as Dallastown, Dallastown High, DAHS, and DHS. According to the National Center for Education Statistics, in the 2021-2022 school year, Dallastown Area High School reported an enrollment of 1,952 pupils in grades nine through twelve.

== History ==
The first Dallastown High School class graduated in 1898. The first constructed building to house the newly created Dallastown High School, a combination of local schoolhouses, was on Charles St. in Dallastown, now Dallastown Elementary. This building became too small, and effective July 1, 1958; the school districts of Loganville, Springfield and York Township became the York Imperial Union School District. Accordingly, the Dallastown Area School System, which operated all of the schools in the area, grades 1 through 12, was composed of three member districts: Dallastown Borough, Yoe Borough and York Imperial Union. Realizing an immediate need for a building for secondary school purposes, a site was selected and construction of a 167,262-square-foot (15,539.1 m^{2}) building began. On September 1, 1958, the doors of the new Dallastown Area High School opened. The Dallastown Area High School was first constructed in 1958 and underwent a major renovation and remodel in 2001. The current building contains the longest school hallway in Pennsylvania, at almost one third of a mile long.

== Campus ==
The Dallastown High School is adjoined with Dallastown Area Middle School to form the Dallastown Middle-High School Campus. Due to growing overcrowding, the district administration determined building a new school to host grades four to six, the Dallastown Area Intermediate School, would help to alleviate this problem. The district removed the sixth grade from the Middle School in 2010, the year the Intermediate School was completed, allowing the High School to obtain some of the former Middle School classrooms. An enclosed hallway was built to connect the high school to the former middle school wing. In 2011, the high school became more energy efficient with solar panels on the roof of the campus; the panels were dedicated to long-time Dallastown Area School District board member Earl Miller.

== Extracurricular activities ==
Dallastown's school newspaper, The Beacon, is published monthly; the yearbook, The Spectator, is produced annually. Each is student-run.

== Athletics ==
=== The York Dispatch Cup ===
Awarded annually since 2006, the York Dispatch Cup recognizes the most successful athletic programs in the York-Adams League. Dallastown competes in the Large School Division.

== Notable alumni ==
- Rick Ufford-Chase, Class of 1982, Presbyterian activist and moderator of 216th General Assembly of the Presbyterian Church (USA), the youngest in history
- Kenny Johnson, Class of 2023, college football wide receiver for the Texas Tech Red Raiders
- Tina Kotek, Class of 1984 or 1985, Speaker of the Oregon House of Representatives and Governor of Oregon as of January 2023.
- Scott Wagner, Class of 1974, politician, former owner of York Waste Disposal and Penn Waste, current owner of KBS Trucking.
