= Axiom Strategies =

Republican political consulting firm

- Type: Private
- Industry: Political consulting
- Founded: 2005
- Founder: Jeff Roe
- Headquarters: Kansas City, Missouri
- Website: axiomstrategies.com/

Axiom Strategies is one of the largest Republican political consulting firms in the United States. Founded in 2005 by Jeff Roe, who has been described as "Ted Cruz's Karl Rove", it has been described as a "mega firm" by industry professionals. Originally based in Kansas City, Missouri, it has thirteen offices across the country and approximately 150 full-time employees.

As of 2021, Axiom Strategies owns ten vendor companies. Through the company or its vendor network Axiom Strategies offers services including polling, fundraising, advertising, and public affairs to candidates. From 2018 to 2020, Axiom Strategies' Clout Public Affairs division lobbied on behalf of the Government of Cameroon.

== History ==
In 2016, Axiom Strategies was enlisted by Kelli Ward in her unsuccessful Senate candidacy in Arizona versus incumbent John McCain. In August 2019, Axiom hired former acting US Attorney General Matthew Whitaker as managing director of its Clout Public Affairs division. In 2017 Axiom merged with Revolvis, a west coast consulting firm.

In 2018, the company entered into a partnership with The Prosper Group, a digital marketing agency. In 2019 Axiom acquired the Kozlow Group and the Momentum Strategy Group, both of which are based in Florida. The firm opened an office in Orange County, California in 2019 preparation for multiple competitive House elections in the area in 2020.

Axiom Strategies has been credited with assisting client Glenn Youngkin's victory in the 2021 Virginia gubernatorial election. In the 2022 Missouri Senate election, the firm has provided services on behalf of Republican candidate Eric Schmitt.

In 2024 Axiom Strategies advised the Royals and Chiefs efforts to pass a County tax Ballot Initiative which failed by a wide margin.

== Cameroon lobbying ==
In September 2018, Axiom Strategies' Clout Public Affairs division signed on to lobby for the Government of Cameroon for $55,000/month. Former HuffPost managing director Jimmy Soni and David Polyansky, the former Chief of Staff to Ted Cruz, were hired through the Clout Public Affairs division to advocate for Cameroonian interests in Washington.

Axiom consultants were contracted to promote a “positive and favorable image” of Cameroon’s government through digital ads and to place "targeted op eds in conservative-oriented outlets in order to foster a robust and growing partnership narrative into the future...” according to Department of Justice filings.

In 2020, Axiom Strategies terminated its contract with the Cameroonian government.

== Ponzi scheme ==
In August 2026, Siddharth Jawahar retained Axiom Strategies leading up to a trial for a $35 million Ponzi scheme. Prison recordings of conversations between Jawahar and Roe included plans for favorable news coverage in the judge's locality and positive recommendations from elected officials. Shortly after, Sam Graves sent a letter to the judge urging a lenient sentence and the Jefferson City News Tribune ran a story by Jake Kroesen describing Jawahar as starting an educational program at Ste. Genevieve County jail, which the facility denied existing.
