= Robert O. Beers =

American politician

Member of the Pennsylvania Senate from the 28th district
- In office January 3, 1963 – November 30, 1970
- Preceded by: Harry E. Seyler
- Succeeded by: Ralph W. Hess

Personal details
- Born: February 29, 1916 Scranton, Pennsylvania
- Died: October 8, 2005 (aged 89) York, Pennsylvania
- Education: Bucknell University; Harvard Law School

Robert O. Beers (February 29, 1916 – October 8, 2005) was a member of the Pennsylvania State Senate, serving from 1963 to 1970.
