= Jeff Roe =

American political consultant

Personal details
- Born: September 25, 1970 (age 56) Brookfield, Missouri, U.S.
- Party: Republican
- Spouse: Missy Roe
- Children: 3
- Education: Northwest Missouri State University (BA)
- Website: Official website

Jeff Roe (born September 25, 1970) is an American political consultant and strategist for the Republican Party. He is the founder and principal of Axiom Strategies, a political consulting firm based in Kansas City, Missouri, with twelve offices in eight states. He formerly served as a chief of staff, campaign manager, and longtime aide for United States Representative Sam Graves.

Known for his aggressive campaign techniques, Roe has earned a reputation as a "bare-knuckle" political operative who "plays to win." Roe has been called "the next Karl Rove". His political consulting firm, Axiom Strategies, has won over 50 "Pollie" & Reed awards on its way to an "81% win rate".

Roe has consulted for a variety of local, state, and federal political campaigns including the presidential campaigns of Mike Huckabee, Rick Perry and Ted Cruz. Roe was the senior strategist and campaign manager for Cruz's 2016 presidential bid. Roe has also advised numerous members of Congress, U.S. Senate, governors and other statewide candidates including Virginia Governor Glenn Youngkin, Florida Governor Ron DeSantis, Speaker of the House Kevin McCarthy and House Majority Leader Steve Scalise.

Roe has served as a strategist for the Club for Growth on various issue and candidate campaigns. This includes U.S. Senator Josh Hawley's 2018 victory against Democratic incumbent Claire McCaskill. Additionally, he has worked on numerous ballot measures and issue campaigns; examples include passing Jackson County's bond initiative in 2006 to renovate the Arrowhead and Kaufman stadiums, financing the Raiders stadium in Las Vegas in 2016, and the enactment of Proposition B in Missouri in 2010 to reform puppy mill regulations.

== Background ==
Roe is a native of Brookfield, Missouri. He grew up on his family's farm, which grew corn and soybean, and raised hogs and cattle. When asked how his upbringing prepared him for a career in politics, Roe said "hog farms are a lot cleaner." Roe credits his grandmother - president of her local Republican women's group – with causing him to develop his interest in politics. Roe earned the rank of Eagle Scout at age 15 and joined the Army National Guard at age 17. He served in a 155 mm Howitzer Unit in South Korea, leaving the military in 1994. He graduated from Northwest Missouri State University in 1994 where he wrote conservative columns for his college's newspaper. Roe is an avid baseball fan. During his early political career, he worked part time as a professional baseball umpire, eventually progressing to Division I in 1997 before leaving to pursue campaigns and politics full time. He currently lives with his wife and three children in Houston, Texas.

== Political career ==
Roe's political career began in 1994, working for then-Missouri State Representative Sam Graves. Following Graves' election to the Missouri State Senate in 1994 and then the United States Congress in 2000, Roe became Graves' Chief of Staff.

Roe then got involved in campaign management. One of his early forays included work that saw the Missouri Republican Party win a majority position in the Missouri General Assembly in 2002, for the first time in fifty years. Subsequently, in 2006, Roe founded Axiom Strategies, a Republican campaign consulting firm. By 2008, Axiom Strategies had grown into a multimillion-dollar-a-year company.

Roe and Axiom Strategies became involved with presidential politics for the first time when the firm managed grassroots outreach for Mike Huckabee's 2008 presidential campaign.

In 2006, Congressman Sam Graves' brother Todd Graves was wrongfully dismissed from his position as a U.S. Attorney. It was discovered that Todd Graves' firing was retaliation from Senator Kit Bond's office over Sam Graves' refusal to fire Roe.

Roe and his consulting firm widened their national footprint in 2010, contributing to the election efforts of Congressmen Allen West (FL-22), Rick Crawford (AR-1), Kevin Yoder (KS-3), Blaine Luetkemeyer (MO-9), Sam Graves (MO-6), Billy Long (MO-7), Chuck Fleischmann (TN-3), Jo Ann Emerson (MO-8) and Senators Roy Blunt (MO), Jerry Moran (KS) and John Boozman (AR). Roe also counted a number of high-profile losing clients the same year, including Wink Harman, Jim Barnett, Bill Stouffer, and Van Tran.

In 2011, The Kansas City Star wrote that Roe had "evolved into a mainstream player," citing his work to pass a Kansas City sales tax increase to create a nicer home for wild animals at the Kansas City Zoo. Democratic campaign consultant Steve Glorioso said Roe's work on behalf of the zoo tax increase "raised Roe's stature with the civic community" and that Roe's opponents "probably discovered his horns have smooth, not sharp, edges." His staff grew from eight people in 2008 to seventeen by 2011.

Roe regularly provides commentary for news outlets and publications such as The Kansas City Star, Washington Post, Wall Street Journal, Roll Call, The Hill, Fox News, Politico and radio stations such as KMBC and WPHT.

Roe is well known for using sophisticated polling and campaign data to make strategic decisions, including targeting phone calls and other campaign messages to hit the ideas most likely to resonate with particular voters. Political columnist Al Hunt said that if Cruz is successful, "Roe may become a rock star in politics, on a par with Lee Atwater, James Carville, and David Plouffe." The New Republic called the Cruz campaign "a vintage Jeff Roe campaign: obsessively disciplined, well-funded, laser-focused on the base" and described Roe as "equal parts drill sergeant, data junkie, brawler, and entrepreneur."

=== Election cycles ===
==== 2012-2013 ====
In the 2012 election cycle, Axiom Strategies worked for Rick Perry's presidential campaign and for Richard Mourdock in his upset over Dick Lugar in the Indiana Senate primary. Roe also played a role in Christi Craddick's successful bid for Texas Railroad Commissioner and David Dewhurst's unsuccessful United States Senate campaign. Following the 2012 election cycle, Axiom Strategies won 20 Pollie awards, winning twice as many as their nearest competitor. Axiom was recognized for winning the most Pollies of any Republican mail firm in the United States.

Other clients included the National Association of Realtors, Congressman Richard Hudson (NC-8) and Congresswoman Ann Wagner (MO-2). For his role defeating Proposition B in Missouri, the closest ballot initiative in Missouri since 1992, Roe was named Missouri's "2012 General Consultant All Star." He was also named one of Missouri's top 5 GOP "Influencers" by Campaigns & Elections Magazine.

In 2013, Roe was chosen to speak at the Conservative Political Action Conference (CPAC). Gregg Keller, at the time the executive director of the American Conservative Union, said Roe was invited to speak at the event because he was "one of the most successful political consultants in the country." Roe said the speaking invitation validated a career path which he had launched by knocking on doors for political candidates.

==== 2014-2015 ====
In 2014, Roe hired Travis Smith, the former chief-of-staff for Congressman Kevin Yoder. That same year, Roe was the lead consultant for Martha McSally's successful bid for Congress, in which she defeated incumbent Ron Barber by 167 votes in the closest congressional election in Arizona history. McSally's victory was the closest congressional race in the nation for 2014. Roe was also involved in Mark Walker and David Rouzer's elections to open congressional seats in North Carolina and Glenn Grothman's election to the open congressional seat in Wisconsin. He also consulted for the re-election bids of Kevin Yoder, Ann Wagner, Sam Graves, Blaine Luetkemeyer, Billy Long, Chuck Fleischmann and Jason Smith.

Roe was part of the team in Bruce Rauner's successful campaign for governor in Illinois, Greg Abbott's successful campaign for governor in Texas, and Scott Walker's successful Wisconsin gubernatorial bid. In Texas State Senate races, Roe consulted for Bob Hall, who ousted 12-year incumbent Bob Deuell, and for Don Huffines, who unseated nearly 20-year incumbent John Carona. Roe was involved in five of the top ten Republican takeover seats in the country.

In 2014, Roe was hired by Ted Cruz as a political strategist. According to Politico, Roe was brought on board to build out Cruz's political organization.

==== 2016-2017 ====
After Cruz announced his candidacy for president on March 23, 2015, it was reported that Roe was the campaign manager and senior strategist for Cruz. In December 2015, U.S. News & World Report named Cruz's campaign "best of the 2016 campaign in 2015."

Roe was hired by Catherine Hanaway for her 2016 gubernatorial campaign in Missouri. After the suicide of Republican candidate Tom Schweich, the State Auditor of Missouri, Roe's campaign tactics have been criticized by former U.S. Senator John Danforth.

On January 24, 2016, Roe was featured on Fox News Sunday with Chris Wallace as "Power Player of the Week". At the opening of his interview, Roe said "I think the rigors of democracy require us to have a real full-throated conversation about our beliefs, defend our beliefs, and point out the differences in our opponent's beliefs."

Ted Cruz's victory in the 2016 Republican Iowa caucus put Roe into the spotlight. Roe was credited as "the architect of Cruz's first-place finish." MSNBC commentator Willie Geist called Roe "the David Axelrod of Cruz's campaign". Commenting on Roe's prediction that Cruz would win and Marco Rubio would come close to challenging Donald Trump, Geist said: "They knew to the decimal point what their model could handle and that was almost exactly what the results were."

National Review wrote that Roe was instrumental in the launch of Cruz's presidential campaign that defined him as the evangelical choice in the 2016 presidential election cycle, branding Cruz as "a divinely inspired warrior fighting a two-front battle against cultural secularism and big government."

==== 2018-2019 ====
In 2018, Roe was the senior strategist for Ted Cruz's successful U.S. Senate re-election bid. Roe consulted on Martha McSally's unsuccessful campaign for an open U.S. Senate seat in Arizona. On December 18, 2018, McSally was appointed by Arizona Governor Doug Ducey to fill the remainder of John McCain's U.S. Senate term. Roe also worked on behalf of Ron DeSantis' successful bid for Florida Governor. In his home state of Missouri, Roe served as the chief strategist for Club for Growth's independent expenditure campaign to support Josh Hawley's successful bid for U.S. Senate. Roe's company worked to re-elect more than 90% of his 74 previously elected congressmen, and added Ross Spano (FL-15), Kevin Hern (OK-1), Ron Wright (TX-6), and Lance Gooden (TX-5) to their roster.

==== 2020-2021 ====
In 2020, Roe advised the campaigns of several dozen Republican candidates. These included Tommy Tuberville, Mike Parson, and Eric Schmitt, as well as several congressmen including House minority leader Kevin McCarthy, House minority whip Steve Scalise, Troy Nehls, and Stephanie Bice. This was the year that Axiom Strategies assisted in the election of its 100th member of Congress since the company's founding.

In 2021, Roe managed the campaign of Glenn Youngkin for the office of Governor of Virginia. Youngkin won the Republican primary in a six-way ranked choice election and then faced off against former Democratic governor Terry McAuliffe. The media noted that in Youngkin's victory, he picked up more than 50% of the Hispanic vote, 55% of the Asian vote, and 25% of the vote of Black Americans.

==== 2023-2024 ====
In March 2023, Roe was hired by the Never Back Down Super PAC, a group supporting Florida Governor Ron DeSantis for President in 2024. Roe stepped down from his role with the PAC in December 2023.

Following Roe's stint at Never Back Down, former President Donald Trump and his allies reportedly began warning Republican candidates against hiring Roe or his firm Axiom. This was a means to get revenge on Roe for supporting DeSantis over Trump.

=== Expansion of campaign services ===
Roe's footprint has grown partly by acquiring companies that provide specific campaign services, or by building these services.

Roe founded a creative agency and direct mail firm called "Command" and the polling and public opinion research company Remington Research Group. Roe restructured his business model in August 2013 in order to handle an uptick in business. Axiom's internal direct mail capability was spun off into a standalone business called Candidate Command, and both the mail firm and Axiom grew by 40%. Roe also owns Capitol Franking Group, which creates franked mail for members of Congress.

In 2017, Axiom acquired research firm Cannon Research Group and campaign management firm Revolvis out of California. It also expanded its own in-house digital and traditional media buying firm, AxMedia, and purchased the fundraising firm High Cotton Consulting and HenryAlan, a compliance shop.

In 2018, Roe's political operation grew to include a ground game firm called Vanguard Field Strategies. Vanguard Field Strategies worked on 52 individual campaigns in 19 different states in 2018. Roe also announced a strategic partnership with Prosper Group, a digital marketing agency, that combined represented a quarter of GOP lawmakers at the time. As reported by Roll Call, the partnership presented a significant strategic value in that "general consultants who manage campaigns will now have more of a voice inside the digital teams of each campaign when they partner with Prosper."

In 2019, Axiom acquired Wright, Williams and Associate, a grassroots and field management operation, and merged it into its Vanguard Strategies shop. They also launched "Candidate Command." The write-up in Campaigns & Elections said, "One of the biggest full-service shops on the right is getting into the self-service mail game… with clients able to send a single mail piece or an entire campaign and hit from 30-30,000 households."
