= Dallastown Area School District =

School district in Pennsylvania

Coordinates: 39.89312°N 76.65171°W

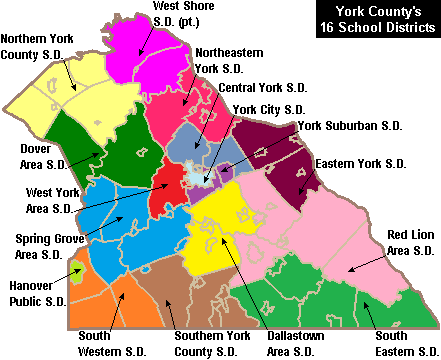

Address
- 700 New School Lane Dallastown, York County, Pennsylvania, 17313; United States

District information
- Type: Public
- Motto: "Dedication to Excellence"

Students and staff
- District mascot: Wildcats
- Colors: Blue and White

Other information
- Website: Dallastown Area School District website

The Dallastown Area School District is a large, suburban, public school district serving the Boroughs of Dallastown, Jacobus, Loganville, and Yoe and Springfield Township and York Township in York County, Pennsylvania. The district covers 52.5-square-mile (136 km^{2}). There were approximately 35,000 residents in 2009. The US Census reported that the population had increased to 41,142 people in 2010.

Dallastown Area School District operates five elementary schools (K-3), one intermediate school (4-6), one middle school (7-8), and one high school (9-12).

== Extracurriculars ==
=== Sports ===
Dallastown Area High School and Middle School teams are part of the PIAA triple or quad A, District 3, and York/Adams Interscholastic Athletic Association (YAIAA) Division I. In 2007, all of Dallastown Area High School's fall sports teams went on to compete in District III post-season play.

The District funds:

Boys

- Baseball - AAAA
- Basketball- AAAA
- Cross Country - AAA
- Football - AAAA
- Golf - AAA
- Indoor Track and Field - AAAA
- Lacrosse - AAAA
- Soccer - AAA
- Swimming and Diving - AAA
- Tennis - AAA
- Track and Field - AAA
- Volleyball - AAA
- Wrestling - AAA

Girls

- Basketball - AAAA
- Cross Country - AAA
- Indoor Track and Field - AAAA
- Field Hockey - AAA
- Lacrosse - AAAA
- Soccer (Fall) - AAA
- Softball - AAAA
- Swimming and Diving - AAAA
- Girls' Tennis - AAA
- Track and Field - AAA
- Volleyball - AAA

Middle School Sports

Boys

- Basketball
- Cross Country
- Football
- Soccer
- Track and Field
- Wrestling

Girls

- Basketball
- Cross Country
- Field Hockey
- Softball
- Track and Field
- Volleyball

According to PIAA Directory July 2012
