= Jacobus, Pennsylvania =

Borough in Pennsylvania, US

- Borough
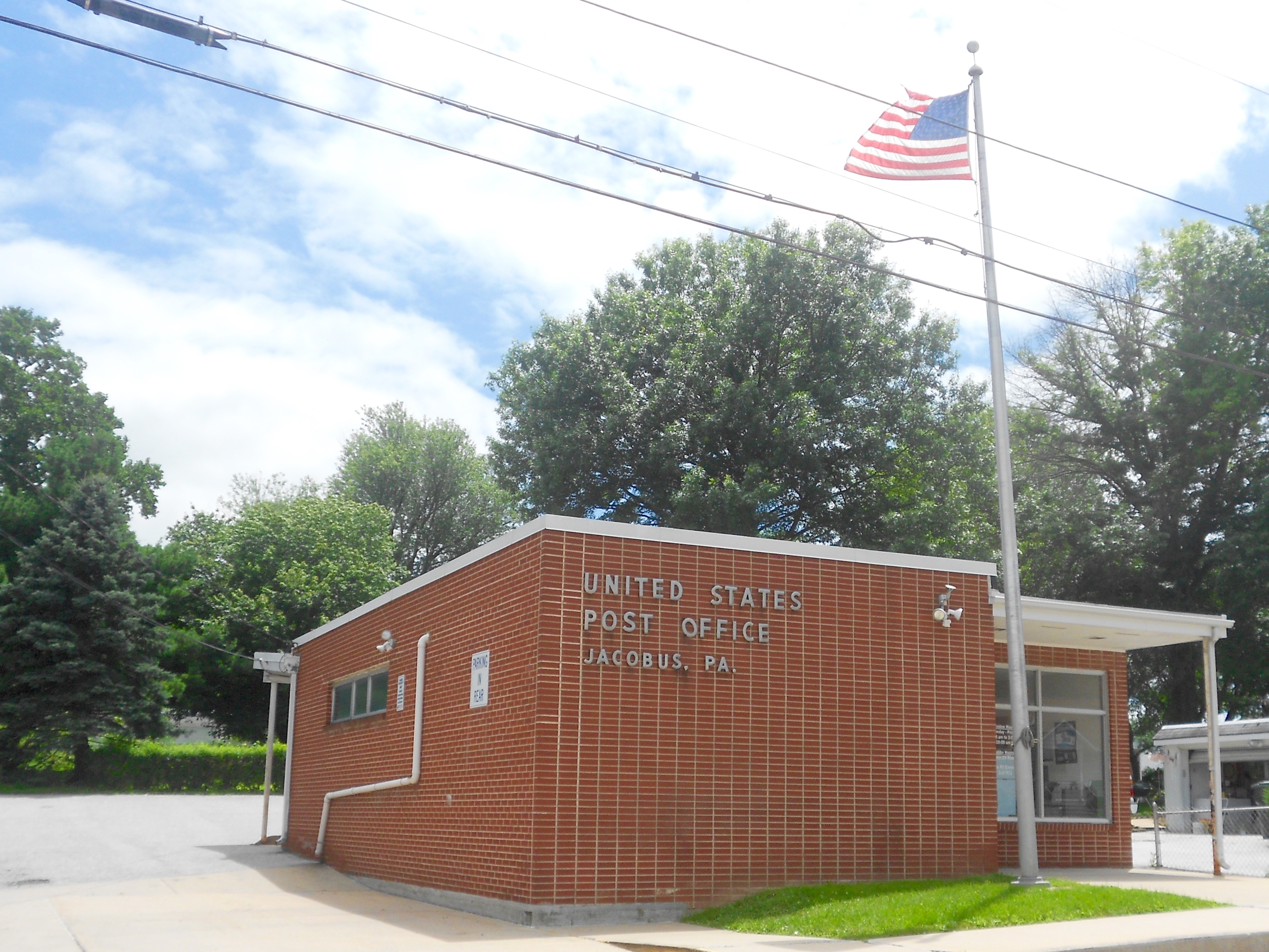
- Post office

- Location in York County and the U.S. state of Pennsylvania.

- Location of Jacobus in Pennsylvania Jacobus (the United States)
- Coordinates: 39°52′57″N 76°42′43″W
- Country: United States
- State: Pennsylvania
- County: York
- Settled: 1837
- Incorporated: 1929

Government
  - Type: Borough Council
  - Mayor: Lance E. Beard

Area
  - Total: 0.93 sq mi (2.41 km^{2})
  - Land: 0.93 sq mi (2.41 km^{2})
  - Water: 0 sq mi (0.00 km^{2})
- Elevation: 623 ft (190 m)

Population (2020)
  - Total: 1,830
  - Density: 1,966.3/sq mi (759.19/km^{2})
- Time zone: UTC-5 (Eastern (EST))
  - Summer (DST): UTC-4 (EDT)
- Zip code: 17407
- Area code: 717
- FIPS code: 42-37640
- Website: www.jacobuspa.com

Jacobus (/dʒɑːkoʊbʌs/) is a borough in York County, Pennsylvania. The population was 1,829 at the time of the 2020 census. The borough is located to the south of nearby York.

== History ==
Founded in 1837, Jacobus was originally called "New Paradise." The name was later changed because of misdelivered mail between New Paradise and the town of Paradise, in neighboring Lancaster County.

The name "Jacobus" was derived from the name of the town's postmaster, Jacob Geiselman (1829–1909). To correct the problem of the misdelivered mail, the United States Post Office Department notified Geiselman to change the name of the post office; however, Geiselman was unable to think of another name. Therefore, the mail was sorted and forwarded to Geiselman labeled as "Jacob-US Mail"; which was later shortened to "Jacob-US." The post office was then renamed Jacobus, and the town was renamed accordingly. In 1929, Jacobus became an incorporated borough under Pennsylvania law.

== Notable Places and Surrounding Area ==
Jacobus and its surrounding area is home to a number of parks, trails, lakes, and other places of natural beauty as well as being just off the historic York County Rail Trail. The surrounding area of Jacobus in Springfield Township also features farms and agricultural land.

Richard M. Nixon County Park, a 187-acre wildlife park, is located just outside the borough. The park features foot traffic only trails and a variety of natural habitats, has wildlife feeding areas, and operates the Nixon Park Nature Center. First opened in 1978 and then expanded in 1992, the 14,000 square foot Nature Center houses displays of past and present wildlife of York County, various Native American artifacts, mounts of wildlife from all over the world, among other displays.

The Jacobus area also features Lake Redman and Lake Williams, two reservoirs operated by the York Water Company. Both lakes lie within the William Kain County Park. The park is a 1,637-acre park which features fishing, boating, hunting, horseshoe pits, RC aircraft landing strip, among others. The park also operates the William Kain County Trail System; a system of 12 marked trails open to mountain biking, horseback riding, or walking.

== Geography ==
Jacobus is located at 39°52′57″N 76°42′43″W (39.882516, -76.712068).

According to the United States Census Bureau, the borough has a total area of 0.9 square miles (2.3 km^{2}), all land.

== Demographics ==
Historical population
| Census | Pop. | Note | %± |
|---|---|---|---|
| 1930 | 445 | | — |
| 1940 | 552 | | 24.0% |
| 1950 | 706 | | 27.9% |
| 1960 | 968 | | 37.1% |
| 1970 | 1,360 | | 40.5% |
| 1980 | 1,396 | | 2.6% |
| 1990 | 1,370 | | −1.9% |
| 2000 | 1,203 | | −12.2% |
| 2010 | 1,841 | | 53.0% |
| 2020 | 1,830 | | −0.6% |
| 2021 (est.) | 1,824 | ▼ | −0.3% |

As of the census of 2000, there were 1,203 people, 481 households, and 379 families living in the borough. The population density was 1,316.0 inhabitants per square mile (508.1/km^{2}). There were 500 housing units at an average density of 547.0 units per square mile (211.2 units/km^{2}).

The racial makeup of the borough was 99.42% White, 0.25% Native American, 0.17% Asian, and 0.17% from two or more races. Hispanic or Latino of any race were 0.25% of the population.

There were 481 households, out of which 31.0% had children under the age of eighteen living with them; 68.0% were married couples living together, 7.9% had a female householder with no husband present, and 21.2% were non-families. 19.3% of all households were made up of individuals, and 9.6% had someone living alone who was 65 years of age or older. The average household size was 2.49 and the average family size was 2.84.

In the borough the population was spread out, with 22.3% under the age of 18, 4.8% from 18 to 24, 28.2% from 25 to 44, 28.1% from 45 to 64, and 16.6% who were 65 years of age or older. The median age was 42 years. For every 100 females there were 94.3 males. For every 100 females age 18 and over, there were 90.4 males.

The median income for a household in the borough was $44,185, and the median income for a family was $52,500. Males had a median income of $35,903 versus $25,139 for females. The per capita income for the borough was $23,224. None of the families and 1.3% of the population were living below the poverty line, including no one under eighteen and 1.7% of those over 64.

== Emergency Services ==
Jacobus Borough is primarily served by Goodwill Fire Company #1 of Jacobus (Station 18) for fire/rescue services, Jacobus Lions Ambulance Club (Station 18) for emergency medical services, and York County Regional Police Department for law enforcement services.

Founded in 1879, the fire department operates 2 engines (Engines 18–1 and 18–2), a brush truck for brush fires (Brush 18), a water rescue team, and a fire police unit (Traffic 18). The ambulance department is Advanced Life Support capable and staffs a 24-hour 911 ambulance.
