= Dallastown, Pennsylvania =

Borough in Pennsylvania, US

- Borough
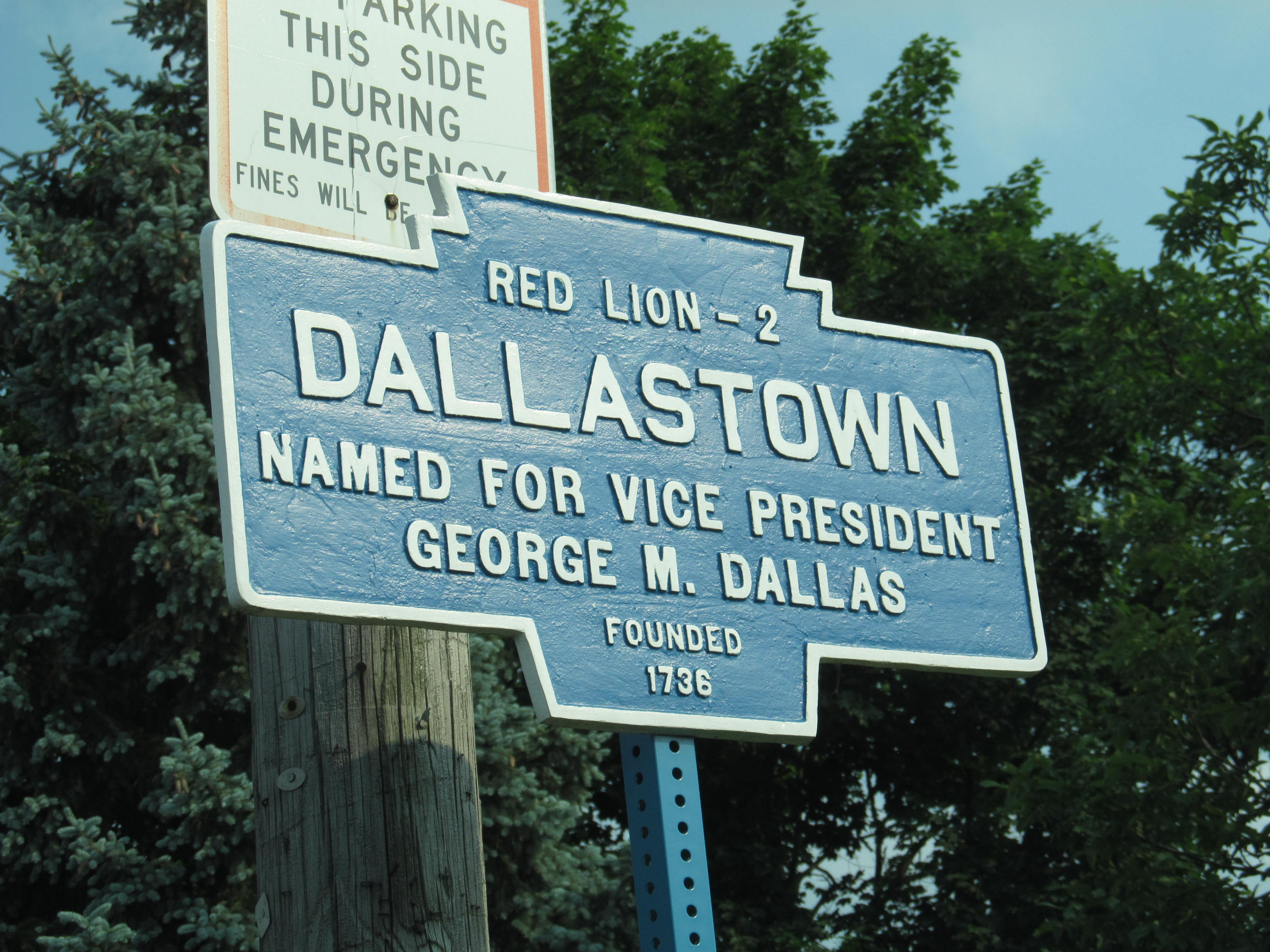
- Keystone Marker

- Location in York County and the U.S. state of Pennsylvania.

- Location of Dallastown in Pennsylvania Dallastown (the United States)
- Coordinates: 39°54′0″N 76°38′27″W
- Country: United States
- State: Pennsylvania
- County: York
- Settled: 1736
- Incorporated: 1866

Government
  - Type: Borough Council
  - Mayor: Kristine Cousler-Womack

Area
  - Total: 0.78 sq mi (2.03 km^{2})
  - Land: 0.78 sq mi (2.03 km^{2})
  - Water: 0 sq mi (0.00 km^{2})
- Elevation: 876 ft (267 m)

Population (2020)
  - Total: 4,187
  - Density: 5,342.2/sq mi (2,062.63/km^{2})
- Time zone: UTC-5 (Eastern (EST))
  - Summer (DST): UTC-4 (EDT)
- Zip code: 17313
- Area code: 717
- FIPS code: 42-18072
- Website: Dallastown

Dallastown is a borough in York County, Pennsylvania, United States. The population was 4,187 at the 2020 census. It is part of the York–Hanover metropolitan area.

== History ==
Settled in 1736, the town was renamed after George M. Dallas of Philadelphia (Vice President of the United States during the Polk administration) during the presidential campaign of 1844. Dallastown was incorporated as a borough in April 1866.

President Lyndon Johnson visited Dallastown in 1966 as part of the town's centennial celebration.

== Geography ==
According to the U.S. Census Bureau, the borough has a total area of 0.8 square miles (2.1 km^{2}), all land.

== Demographics ==
Historical population
Census	Pop.	Note	%±
1870	287		—
1880	482		67.9%
1890	779		61.6%
1900	1,181		51.6%
1910	1,884		59.5%
1920	2,124		12.7%
1930	2,849		34.1%
1940	2,917		2.4%
1950	3,304		13.3%
1960	3,615		9.4%
1970	3,560		−1.5%
1980	3,949		10.9%
1990	3,974		0.6%
2000	4,087		2.8%
2010	4,049		−0.9%
2020	4,195		3.6%
2023 (est.)	4,174	▼	−0.5%

=== 2020 census ===
As of the 2020 census, Dallastown had a population of 4,195. The median age was 36.0 years. 24.9% of residents were under the age of 18 and 13.7% of residents were 65 years of age or older. For every 100 females there were 102.3 males, and for every 100 females age 18 and over there were 99.1 males age 18 and over.

100.0% of residents lived in urban areas, while 0.0% lived in rural areas.

There were 1,688 households in Dallastown, of which 33.8% had children under the age of 18 living in them. Of all households, 38.7% were married-couple households, 23.0% were households with a male householder and no spouse or partner present, and 26.5% were households with a female householder and no spouse or partner present. About 28.0% of all households were made up of individuals and 9.1% had someone living alone who was 65 years of age or older.

There were 1,780 housing units, of which 5.2% were vacant. The homeowner vacancy rate was 1.2% and the rental vacancy rate was 5.0%.

Racial composition as of the 2020 census
Race	Number	Percent
White	3,579	85.3%
Black or African American	221	5.3%
American Indian and Alaska Native	9	0.2%
Asian	15	0.4%
Native Hawaiian and Other Pacific Islander	2	0.0%
Some other race	90	2.1%
Two or more races	279	6.7%
Hispanic or Latino (of any race)	302	7.2%

=== 2000 census ===
At the 2000 census there were 4,087 people, 1,622 households, and 1,026 families living in the borough. The population density was 5,567.2 inhabitants per square mile (2,149.5/km^{2}). There were 1,707 housing units at an average density of 2,325.2 units per square mile (897.8 units/km^{2}). The racial makeup of the borough was 97.19% White, 0.78% African American, 0.20% Native American, 0.34% Asian, 0.12% Pacific Islander, 0.39% from other races, and 0.98% from two or more races. Hispanic or Latino of any race were 1.79%.

Of the 1,622 households 31.6% had children under the age of 18 living with them, 46.4% were married couples living together, 12.5% had a female householder with no husband present, and 36.7% were non-families. 29.8% of households were one person and 12.4% were one person aged 65 or older. The average household size was 2.36 and the average family size was 2.91.

The age distribution was 23.3% under the age of 18, 9.7% from 18 to 24, 31.1% from 25 to 44, 17.6% from 45 to 64, and 18.3% 65 or older. The median age was 36 years. For every 100 females there were 90.2 males. For every 100 females age 18 and over, there were 82.6 males.

The median household income was $37,500 and the median family income was $44,500. Males had a median income of $35,679 versus $25,169 for females. The per capita income for the borough was $18,249. About 3.4% of families and 8.7% of the population were below the poverty line, including 6.7% of those under age 18 and 19.2% of those age 65 or over.

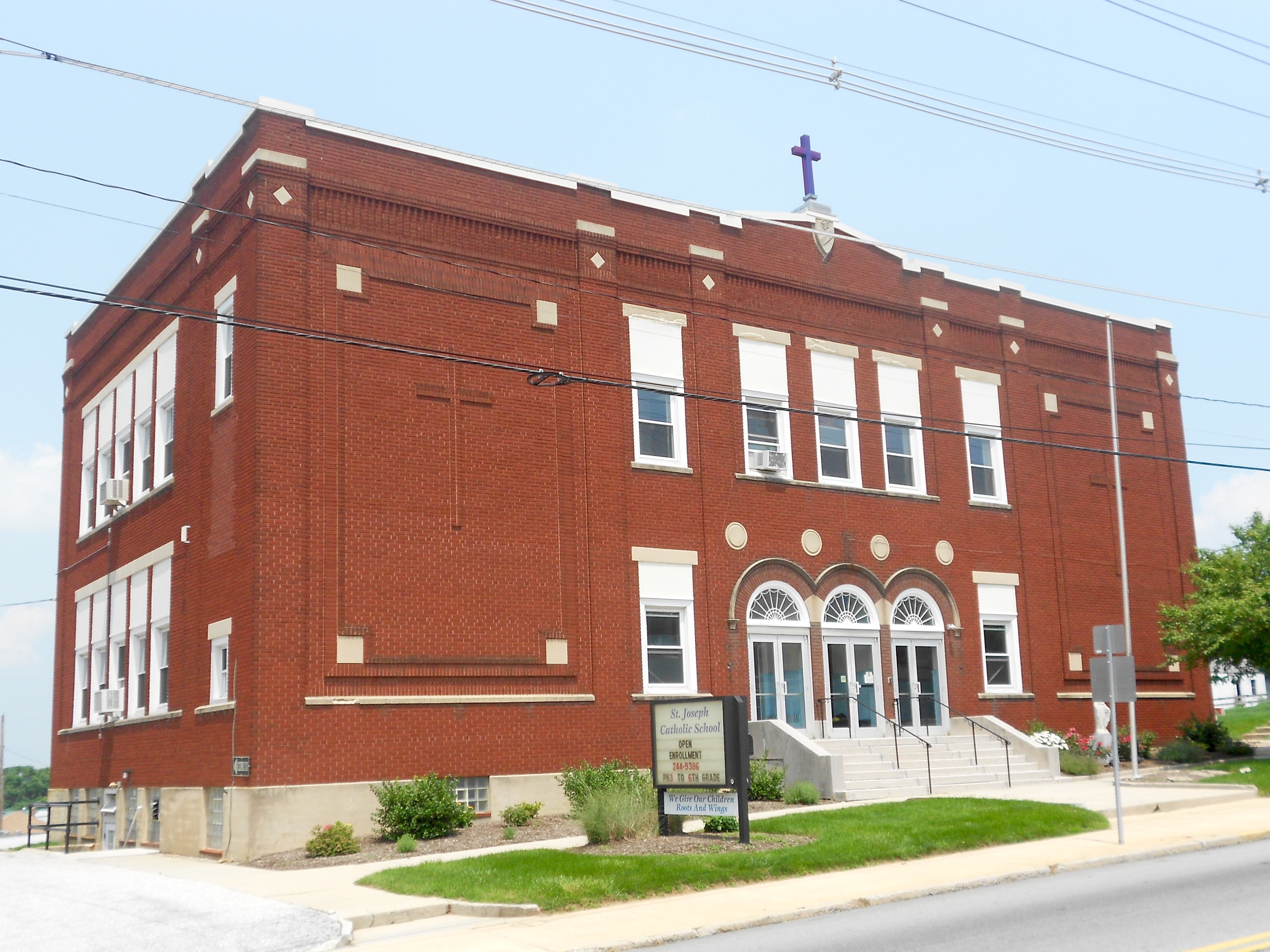
St. Joseph's Catholic School

== Education ==
Dallastown Borough is home to Dallastown Elementary School, Dallastown Area High School, and Middle School, which is part of the Dallastown Area School District, which consists of eight local schools, including the Dallastown Intermediate School, built in 2010.

St. Joseph's Catholic School was also in Dallastown. It provided Catholic education to students in grades Pre-K to 6. It is now closed.

Dallastown Area Senior High School has the longest hallway in a school in Pennsylvania, almost 1/3 of a mile (1,800 feet; 540 meters).

== Notable people ==
- Kim Jones, sports reporter, was born in Dallastown.
- Tina Kotek, Oregon politician and current Governor, attended high school in Dallastown.
- Cameron Mitchell, film and television actor, was born in Dallastown.
