= National Register of Historic Places listings in York County, Pennsylvania =

Location of York County in Pennsylvania

This is a list of the National Register of Historic Places listings in York County, Pennsylvania.

This is intended to be a complete list of the properties and districts on the National Register of Historic Places in York County, Pennsylvania, United States. The locations of National Register properties and districts for which the latitude and longitude coordinates are included below, may be seen in a map.

There are 101 properties and districts listed on the National Register in the county.

This National Park Service list is complete through NPS recent listings posted June 6, 2026.

== Current listings ==
	Name on the Register	Image	Date listed	Location	City or town	Description
1	Ashley and Bailey Company Silk Mill	Ashley and Bailey Company Silk Mill	February 21, 1991 (#91000090)	1237 West Princess Street; 39°57′07″N 76°45′03″W	West York	Mixed-income apartment building. Currently occupied and in serious need of exterior repair
2	Ashton-Hursh House	Ashton-Hursh House	November 15, 2003 (#03001155)	204 Limekiln Road, south of New Cumberland; 40°12′54″N 76°52′23″W	Fairview Township	
3	Henry and Elizabeth Berkheimer Farm	Henry and Elizabeth Berkheimer Farm	November 15, 2000 (#00001382)	240 Bentz Mill Road; 40°02′26″N 77°00′50″W	Washington Township	
4	Billmeyer House	Billmeyer House	November 10, 1970 (#70000557)	East Market Street; 39°57′51″N 76°43′23″W	York	
5	Michael and Magdealena Bixler Farmstead	Michael and Magdealena Bixler Farmstead	July 27, 2000 (#00000850)	400 Mundis Race Road; 40°01′15″N 76°42′16″W	East Manchester Township	
6	Barnett Bobb House	Barnett Bobb House	October 29, 1975 (#75001682)	Rear of 157 West Market Street; 39°57′43″N 76°43′54″W	York	
7	Bridge 182+42, Northern Central Railway	Bridge 182+42, Northern Central Railway	May 4, 1995 (#95000542)	Northern Central railroad tracks over Pennsylvania Route 616 and Codorus Creek, south of Glen Rock; 39°46′39″N 76°43′25″W	Shrewsbury Township	
8	Bridge 5+92, Northern Central Railway	Bridge 5+92, Northern Central Railway	May 4, 1995 (#95000548)	Northern Central railroad tracks over South Main Street, north of Pennsylvania Route 214; 39°51′15″N 76°46′18″W	Seven Valleys	
9	Bridge 634, Northern Central Railway	Bridge 634, Northern Central Railway	May 4, 1995 (#95000543)	Northern Central Railroad tracks over an Pleasant Valley Rd. and Codorus Creek, northwest of Railroad; 39°46′23″N 76°43′14″W	Shrewsbury Township	
10	Bridge between East Manchester and Newberry Townships	Bridge between East Manchester and Newberry Townships	June 22, 1988 (#88000795)	York-Haven Rd. (State Route 181) over Conewago Creek; 40°04′53″N 76°43′03″W	East Manchester and Newberry Townships	
11	Bridge in Washington Township	Bridge in Washington Township	June 22, 1988 (#88000817)	Legislative Route 66150 over Bermudian Creek, south of Kralltown; 40°00′31″N 76°58′29″W	Washington Township	Demolished c.2011
12	S. B. Brodbeck Housing	S. B. Brodbeck Housing	September 6, 1990 (#90001413)	Main Street in Brodbecks; 39°46′13″N 76°49′39″W	Codorus Township	
13	Burgholtshouse	Burgholtshouse	June 22, 1979 (#79002369)	South of East Prospect on Pennsylvania Route 124; 39°57′57″N 76°30′54″W	Lower Windsor Township	
14	Chestnut Hill	Chestnut Hill	September 1, 2001 (#01000952)	1105 Windsor Road; 39°56′22″N 76°37′01″W	Windsor Township	
15	Clear Spring Mill	Clear Spring Mill	November 4, 1996 (#96001199)	Western corner of the junction of Capitol Hill and Clear Spring Roads, south of Dillsburg; 40°03′25″N 77°03′53″W	Franklin Township	
16	Codorus Forge and Furnace Historic District	Codorus Forge and Furnace Historic District	September 6, 1991 (#91001132)	Junction of River Farm and Furnace Roads, southeast of Saginaw; 40°03′05″N 76°39′26″W	Hellam Township	
17	Consumers Cigar Box Company	Consumers Cigar Box Company	September 24, 1999 (#99001196)	121 First Avenue; 39°53′48″N 76°36′21″W	Red Lion	Factory building converted to apartments
18	Cookes House	Cookes House	October 5, 1972 (#72001182)	438-440 Cookes House Lane; 39°57′18″N 76°44′09″W	York	
19	Coulsontown Cottages Historic District	Coulsontown Cottages Historic District	January 31, 1985 (#85000175)	Ridge Road and Main, east of Delta; 39°43′29″N 76°18′28″W	Peach Bottom Township	
20	Deer Creek Bridge, Stewartstown Railroad	Deer Creek Bridge, Stewartstown Railroad	May 4, 1995 (#95000544)	Stewartstown Railroad tracks over Deer Creek at Deer Creek Road, east of Shrewsbury; 39°45′30″N 76°38′55″W	Hopewell and Shrewsbury Townships	
21	Delta Historic District	Delta Historic District	September 15, 1983 (#83002288)	Main Street; 39°43′27″N 76°19′53″W	Delta	
22	Delta Trestle Bridge, Maryland and Pennsylvania Railroad	Delta Trestle Bridge, Maryland and Pennsylvania Railroad	May 4, 1995 (#95000550)	Maryland and Pennsylvania Railroad tracks over an unnamed stream, east of Bunker Hill Road, north of Delta; 39°43′44″N 76°19′49″W	Peach Bottom Township	
23	Diamond Silk Mill	Diamond Silk Mill	July 24, 1992 (#92000949)	Junction of Ridge Avenue and Hay Street in East York; 39°58′35″N 76°42′00″W	Springettsbury Township	
24	Dill's Tavern	Dill's Tavern	March 18, 2004 (#04000195)	227 North Baltimore Street; 40°06′55″N 77°02′14″W	Dillsburg	
25	Dritt Mansion	Dritt Mansion	August 16, 1977 (#77001206)	3.5 miles (5.6 km) south of Wrightsville on Pennsylvania Route 624; 39°58′39″N 76°29′48″W	Lower Windsor Township	
26	East York Historic District	East York Historic District	March 12, 1999 (#99000326)	Bounded by Oxford Street, Wallace Street, Royal Street, and Eastern Boulevard; 39°58′27″N 76°41′17″W	Springettsbury Township	
27	Eichelberger High School	Eichelberger High School	April 27, 1995 (#95000517)	195 Stock Street; 39°48′21″N 76°59′11″W	Hanover	
28	Emig Mansion	Emig Mansion	September 7, 1984 (#84003586)	3342 North George Street in Emigsville; 40°01′10″N 76°43′42″W	Manchester Township	
29	Etters Bridge	Etters Bridge	February 27, 1986 (#86000308)	Green Lane Drive and Yellow Breeches Creek; 40°13′26″N 76°53′51″W	Fairview Township	Extends into Cumberland County
30	Fairmount Historic District	Fairmount Historic District	November 30, 1999 (#99001428)	Roughly bounded by Cherry Lane, Stevens Avenue, and Cottage Hill Road; 39°58′03″N 76°43′59″W	York	
31	Farmers Market	Farmers Market	November 25, 1977 (#77001207)	380 West Market Street; 39°57′33″N 76°44′13″W	York	
32	Fissel's School	Fissel's School	October 24, 1997 (#97001253)	Junction of Fissel's Church Road and Country Club Road; 39°46′05″N 76°44′00″W	Shrewsbury Township	
33	Forry House	Forry House	December 27, 1977 (#77001208)	149 North Newberry Street; 39°57′46″N 76°44′09″W	York	
34	Gen. Horatio Gates House	Gen. Horatio Gates House	December 6, 1971 (#71000737)	157-159 West Market Street; 39°57′43″N 76°43′47″W	York	
35	Gilbert Bridge	Gilbert Bridge	May 5, 1989 (#89000355)	Bishop Road / Gilbert Road over Yellow Breeches Creek, northwest of Siddonsburg; 40°09′13″N 76°58′52″W	Monaghan Township	Extends into Upper Allen Township in Cumberland County
36	Glen Rock Historic District	Glen Rock Historic District	May 30, 1997 (#97000518)	Roughly bounded by Glenvue Road and Hanover, Manchester, Valley, Church, and Center Streets; 39°47′34″N 76°43′58″W	Glen Rock	
37	Goldsboro Historic District	Goldsboro Historic District	June 14, 1984 (#84003589)	Roughly bounded by North, 3rd, Fraser, and Railroad Streets; 40°09′11″N 76°45′02″W	Goldsboro	
38	Guinston United Presbyterian Church	Guinston United Presbyterian Church	January 11, 1976 (#76001682)	East of Laurel off Pennsylvania Route 74 (14130 Guinston Forge Road); 39°50′04″N 76°29′30″W	Chanceford Township	
39	Hammersly-Strominger House	Hammersly-Strominger House	December 20, 1978 (#78002487)	Northeast of Lewisberry on Pennsylvania Route 177; 40°08′37″N 76°51′01″W	Newberry Township	
40	Hanover Historic District	Hanover Historic District	January 2, 1997 (#96001552)	Roughly bounded by Elm Avenue, Broadway, Eisenhower Drive, Hollywood Avenue, and the Hanover borough boundary line 39°48′23″N 76°58′58″W	Hanover	
41	Hanover Junction Railroad Station	Hanover Junction Railroad Station	December 29, 1983 (#83004258)	Pennsylvania Route 616 at Hanover Junction; 39°50′37″N 76°46′38″W	North Codorus Township	
42	Howard Tunnel, Northern Central Railway	Howard Tunnel, Northern Central Railway	May 19, 1995 (#95000541)	Northern Central railroad tracks near the South Branch of Codorus Creek, southeast of New Salem; 39°53′28″N 76°45′02″W	North Codorus Township	
43	Hyson Schools Historic District	Hyson Schools Historic District	January 30, 2023 (#100008595)	Round Hill Church Rd., south of intersection with Hyson School Rd. 39°47′25″N 76°34′29″W	East Hopewell Township	
44	Indian Steps Cabin	Indian Steps Cabin	March 9, 1990 (#90000416)	Indian Steps Road, north of Airville; 39°51′48″N 76°22′33″W	Lower Chanceford Township	
45	Kise Mill Bridge	Kise Mill Bridge	June 22, 1988 (#88000799)	Legislative Route 66003 over Bennett Run, east of Lewisberry; 40°06′56″N 76°48′38″W	Newberry Township	
46	Kise Mill Bridge Historic District	Kise Mill Bridge Historic District	October 15, 1980 (#80003650)	Junction of Kise Mill and Roxberry Roads, east of Lewisberry; 40°07′00″N 76°48′36″W	Newberry Township	
47	Laurel-Rex Fire Company House	Laurel-Rex Fire Company House	October 8, 1976 (#76001683)	South Duke Street; 39°57′42″N 76°43′31″W	York	
48	Byrd Leibhart Site (36YO170)	Byrd Leibhart Site (36YO170)	January 14, 2009 (#84003955)	Native Lands County Park; 39°58′41″N 76°29′54″W	Lower Windsor Township	
49	Oscar Leibhart Site (36YO9)		May 24, 1984 (#84003597)	Along the Susquehanna River, south of Trinity Church Road and west of Long Level Road; 39°59′20″N 76°30′01″W	Lower Windsor Township	
50	McCalls Ferry Farm	McCalls Ferry Farm	November 8, 2000 (#00001344)	447 McCalls Ferry Road; 39°49′30″N 76°21′22″W	Lower Chanceford Township	
51	Englehart Melchinger House	Englehart Melchinger House	August 12, 1992 (#92000990)	5 North Main Street; 40°00′06″N 76°51′03″W	Dover	
52	Merchants Cigar Box Company	Merchants Cigar Box Company	December 2, 2021 (#100007193)	100 East Broad St. 39°54′07″N 76°38′15″W	Dallastown	
53	Mifflin Farm		June 18, 2026 (#100012738)	202 Cool Springs Road; 40°01′42″N 76°32′36″W	Wrightsville	
54	Muddy Creek Bridge, Maryland and Pennsylvania Railroad		May 4, 1995 (#95000540)	Maryland and Pennsylvania railroad tracks over Muddy Creek, east of Creek Ridge Road, south of Sunnyburn; 39°45′37″N 76°21′05″W	Lower Chanceford and Peach Bottom Townships	
55	Muddy Creek Forks Historic District	Muddy Creek Forks Historic District	April 29, 1994 (#94000397)	Junction of Muddy Creek Forks and New Park Roads at Muddy Creek Forks; 39°48′27″N 76°28′31″W	East Hopewell, Fawn, and Lower Chanceford Townships	
56	George Nace (Neas) House	George Nace (Neas) House	April 26, 1972 (#72001181)	113-115 West Chestnut Street; 39°48′03″N 76°59′10″W	Hanover	
57	New Freedom Railroad Station, Northern Central Railway	New Freedom Railroad Station, Northern Central Railway	May 4, 1995 (#95000539)	Front Street; 39°44′24″N 76°42′04″W	New Freedom	
58	The Nook	The Nook	March 1, 1982 (#82003821)	1101 Farquhar Drive, south of York; 39°56′44″N 76°43′27″W	Spring Garden Township	
59	Northwest York Historic District	Northwest York Historic District	September 12, 1983 (#83002289)	Roughly bounded by Carlisle, Texas, Pennsylvania, Newberry, Park, and Linden Avenues; 39°57′42″N 76°44′54″W	York	
60	Old Columbia-Wrightsville Bridge	Old Columbia-Wrightsville Bridge	June 22, 1988 (#88000764)	Legislative Route 128 over the Susquehanna River and a railroad line 40°01′50″N 76°30′41″W	Wrightsville	Extends into Lancaster County
61	Payne's Folly	Payne's Folly	March 6, 1986 (#86000422)	Watters Road; 39°43′32″N 76°30′06″W	Fawn Township	
62	Pettit's Ford	Pettit's Ford	May 3, 1983 (#83002290)	4400 Colonial Road, west of Dover; 39°59′17″N 76°55′50″W	Dover Township	
63	Pierceville Run Agricultural Historic District	Pierceville Run Agricultural Historic District	February 1, 2013 (#12000902)	Roughly bounded by Fair School, Myers, Meckley, Rockville, & Narrow Gauge Rds., & Pierceville Run; 39°46′32″N 76°45′51″W	Codorus Township	
64	Pleasureville Historic District	Pleasureville Historic District	February 18, 2000 (#00000057)	Roughly along North Sherman Street between Cherry Lane and Park View Road in Springettsbury; 40°00′09″N 76°42′17″W	Springettsbury Township	
65	Rev. Anderson B. Quay House	Rev. Anderson B. Quay House	October 24, 1997 (#97001255)	22 North Baltimore Street; 40°06′41″N 77°02′09″W	Dillsburg	
66	Railroad Borough Historic District	Railroad Borough Historic District	March 22, 1984 (#84003601)	Shaub Road North, East, and South Main Street; 39°45′37″N 76°41′54″W	Railroad	
67	Red Lion Borough Historic District	Red Lion Borough Historic District	August 10, 2000 (#00000847)	Roughly bounded by Edgewood Avenue, the Windsor Township line, a Maryland and Pennsylvania line, Chestnut Road, Country Club Road, and the York Township line 39°53′55″N 76°36′35″W	Red Lion	
68	Ridge Road Bridge, Stewartstown Railroad	Ridge Road Bridge, Stewartstown Railroad	May 4, 1995 (#95000545)	Stewartstown Railroad tracks over Ridge Road, west of Stewartstown; 39°45′35″N 76°37′33″W	Hopewell Township	
69	Martin Schultz House	Martin Schultz House	March 11, 1993 (#93000057)	155 Emig Street; 40°00′02″N 76°36′33″W	Hallam	
70	Scott Creek Bridge-North, Maryland and Pennsylvania Railroad	Scott Creek Bridge-North, Maryland and Pennsylvania Railroad	May 4, 1995 (#95000551)	Maryland and Pennsylvania railroad tracks over Scott Creek, west of Watson's Corner and south of Pennsylvania Route 851; 39°44′46″N 76°20′29″W	Peach Bottom Township	
71	William Shelly School and Annex	William Shelly School and Annex	May 2, 2001 (#01000464)	201 North Adams Street; 39°57′22″N 76°45′40″W	West York	
72	Shrewsbury Historic District	Shrewsbury Historic District	March 22, 1984 (#84003605)	Roughly bounded by Highland and Sunset Drives, Park Avenue, and Church and Pine Streets; 39°46′03″N 76°40′49″W	Shrewsbury	
73	Shrewsbury Railroad Station, Stewartstown Railroad	Shrewsbury Railroad Station, Stewartstown Railroad	May 4, 1995 (#95000546)	South Main Street at the Stewartstown Railroad tracks 39°45′26″N 76°40′41″W	Shrewsbury	
74	Sinking Springs Farms	Sinking Springs Farms	July 27, 2000 (#00000848)	Roughly bounded by Church Road, Sinking Springs Ln., North George Street, Locust Lane, the Susquehanna Trail, and Pennsylvania Route 238; 40°00′37″N 76°44′33″W	Manchester Township	
75	South Road Bridge, Northern Central Railway	South Road Bridge, Northern Central Railway	May 4, 1995 (#95000549)	Former Northern Central railroad tracks over an unnamed creek at the South Branch of the Codorus Creek, at Larue; 39°49′14″N 76°45′39″W	Springfield Township	
76	Spring Grove Borough Historic District	Spring Grove Borough Historic District	May 25, 1984 (#84003608)	Roughly bounded by College Avenue and Jackson, Water, East, and Church Streets; 39°52′25″N 76°51′55″W	Spring Grove	
77	Springdale Historic District	Springdale Historic District	August 30, 2001 (#01000926)	Bounded by South George Street, Lombardy Alley, South Queen Street, and Rathon Road; 39°56′58″N 76°43′04″W	York	
78	Stevens School	Stevens School	December 29, 1983 (#83004263)	606 West Philadelphia Street; 39°57′31″N 76°44′40″W	York	
79	Stewartstown Engine House, Stewartstown Railroad	Stewartstown Engine House, Stewartstown Railroad	May 4, 1995 (#95000554)	North Hill Street; 39°45′16″N 76°35′47″W	Stewartstown	
80	Stewartstown Railroad Station	Stewartstown Railroad Station	May 18, 1995 (#95000553)	Junction of West Pennsylvania Avenue and Hill Street; 39°45′15″N 76°35′43″W	Stewartstown	
81	Stone Arch Road Bridge, Stewartstown Railroad	Stone Arch Road Bridge, Stewartstown Railroad	May 4, 1995 (#95000547)	Stewartstown Railroad tracks over Stone Arch Road, east of Railroad; 39°45′01″N 76°41′14″W	Shrewsbury Township	
82	Samuel Stoner Homestead	Samuel Stoner Homestead	January 30, 1976 (#76001684)	South of York off Pennsylvania Route 182; 39°55′25″N 76°45′48″W	West Manchester Township	
83	Strickler Family Farmhouse	Strickler Family Farmhouse	February 21, 1991 (#91000093)	1205 Williams Road, east of York; 39°59′16″N 76°39′33″W	Springettsbury Township	
84	Swigart's Mill	Swigart's Mill	July 23, 1980 (#80003649)	North of Hanover on Berlin Road; 39°56′04″N 76°58′18″W	Paradise Township	
85	United Cigar Manufacturing Company	United Cigar Manufacturing Company	October 28, 1999 (#99001289)	201 North Penn Street; 39°57′45″N 76°44′19″W	York	
86	US Post Office-Hanover	US Post Office-Hanover	December 24, 1992 (#92001719)	141 Broadway; 39°48′07″N 76°58′56″W	Hanover	
87	Valley Road Bridge, Stewartstown Railroad	Valley Road Bridge, Stewartstown Railroad	May 4, 1995 (#95000552)	Stewartstown Railroad tracks over Valley Road, west of Stewartstown; 39°45′19″N 76°36′35″W	Hopewell Township	
88	Wallace-Cross Mill	Wallace-Cross Mill	December 22, 1977 (#77001204)	South of Felton; 39°47′58″N 76°32′27″W	East Hopewell Township	
89	Warrington Meetinghouse	Warrington Meetinghouse	February 20, 1975 (#75001681)	Pennsylvania Route 74, east of Wellsville; 40°03′11″N 76°55′49″W	Warrington Township	
90	Wellsville Historic District	Wellsville Historic District	December 6, 1977 (#77001205)	Pennsylvania Route 74; 40°03′04″N 76°56′26″W	Wellsville	
91	West Side Sanitarium	West Side Sanitarium	May 5, 2004 (#04000400)	1253-1261 West Market Street; 39°57′14″N 76°45′24″W	West York	
92	Hugh and Elizabeth Ross Whiteford House	Hugh and Elizabeth Ross Whiteford House	September 21, 2018 (#100002988)	306 Broad St. 39°43′51″N 76°19′21″W	Delta	
93	Willis House	Willis House	April 20, 1979 (#79002370)	135 Willis Run Road, north of York; 39°58′20″N 76°44′15″W	Manchester Township	
94	Wrightsville Historic District	Wrightsville Historic District	September 12, 1983 (#83002291)	Roughly bounded by the Susquehanna River and Vine, 4th, and Willow Streets; 40°01′26″N 76°31′41″W	Wrightsville	
95	York Armory	York Armory	April 18, 1990 (#90000421)	369 North George Street; 39°58′07″N 76°43′50″W	York	
96	York Casket Company		June 10, 2008 (#08000523)	700-710 Linden Ave. 39°57′35″N 76°44′51″W	York	
97	York Central Market	York Central Market	June 9, 1978 (#78002488)	Philadelphia and Beaver Streets; 39°57′46″N 76°43′47″W	York	
98	York Dispatch Newspaper Offices	York Dispatch Newspaper Offices	March 8, 1978 (#78002489)	15 and 17 East Philadelphia Street; 39°57′50″N 76°43′41″W	York	
99	York Historic District	York Historic District	August 29, 1979 (#79002371)	Roughly bounded by railroad tracks, Hartley Street, Lilac Lane, and Cordorus Creek; 39°57′30″N 76°43′34″W	York	
100	York Iron Company Mine	York Iron Company Mine	March 15, 1985 (#85000580)	North of Green Valley Road, south of Spring Grove; 39°50′29″N 76°48′35″W	North Codorus Township	
101	York Meetinghouse	York Meetinghouse	May 6, 1975 (#75001683)	134 West Philadelphia Street; 39°57′42″N 76°44′10″W	York	

== See also ==
- List of National Historic Landmarks in Pennsylvania
- National Register of Historic Places listings in Pennsylvania
- List of Pennsylvania state historical markers in York County
