= List of Pennsylvania state historical markers in York County =

Location of York County in Pennsylvania

This is a list of the Pennsylvania state historical markers in York County.

This is intended to be a complete list of the official state historical markers placed in York County, Pennsylvania by the Pennsylvania Historical and Museum Commission (PHMC). The locations of the historical markers, as well as the latitude and longitude coordinates as provided by the PHMC's database, are included below when available. There are 62 historical markers located in York County.

== Historical markers ==
Marker title	Image	Date dedicated	Location	Marker type	Topics
Abraham Lincoln		September 14, 1954	PA 94 (Carlisle St.) & Park Ave., Hanover; 39.80283°N 76.98579°W	City	Abraham Lincoln, Government & Politics, Government & Politics 19th Century
Amanda Berry Smith		October 2, 1993	108 S. Main St., Grace U.M. Church, Shrewsbury; 39.76704°N 76.67964°W	Roadside	African American, Education, Music & Theater, Publishing, Religion, Women
America's First Iron Steamboat		October 23, 1947	Pa. 462 (old U.S. 30), .3 mile W of Wrightsville; 40.02154°N 76.54821°W	Roadside	Business & Industry, Transportation
Articles of Confederation		December 19, 2001	NE Corner of Continental Square (Market & George Sts.), York; 39.962671°N 76.72756°W	City	Government & Politics, Government & Politics 18th Century
Battle of Hanover		September 14, 1954	SW section of square, Hanover; 39.80052°N 76.98354°W	City	American Civil War, Military
Black Horse Tavern		December 15, 1949	NW section of square, York; 39.96269°N 76.72818°W	City	Business & Industry, Inns & Taverns, William Penn
Bob Hoffman (promoter)		November 9, 1998	3300 Board Rd. (SR 1031) W of Emigsville, just off I-83 exit, York; 40.02343°N 76.74147°W	Roadside	Government & Politics, Sports
Camp Security		July 17, 1947	E Market St (PA 462/old US 30), 3 miles E of York at Stonybrook; 39.98382°N 76.64833°W	Roadside	American Revolution, Military
Captain Thomas Cresap (1703-1790) (PLAQUE)		September 27, 1942	PA 624 at Bank Hill Rd., 2.4 NE of Craley; 39.97296°N 76.49993°W	Plaque	Early Settlement, Government & Politics 17th Century, Houses & Homesteads, Military, Native American
Codorus Furnace		August 12, 1954	PA 24 at SR 1008, Starview; 40.04842°N 76.68839°W	Roadside	Business & Industry, Coal, Furnaces, Iron
Colonel Thomas Hartley		December 14, 1949	W. Market St. between Beaver & George Sts., York; 39.96196°N 76.72888°W	City	Government & Politics, Government & Politics 18th Century
Cresap's Fort		June 6, 1960	Pa. 624, 2.4 miles NE of Craley; 39.97359°N 76.49425°W	Roadside	Buildings, Forts
First Pinchot Road		May 25, 1963	PA 177 (Rossville Rd.) & Bull Rd., 1.5 miles S of Lewisberry; 40.116114°N 76.86717°W	Roadside	Roads, Transportation
Gen. Horatio Gates		December 14, 1949	W. Market St. between Pershing Ave. & Beaver St., York; 39.961144°N 76.73135°W	City	American Revolution, George Washington, Military
Gen. Wayne Headquarters		December 14, 1949	NW corner, Market & Beaver Sts., York; 39.96175°N 76.72975°W	City	American Revolution, Military
Gettysburg campaign		November 12, 1947	PA 74 (Carlisle Rd.) & Davidsburg Rd., Weiglestown, S of Dover; 39.98382°N 76.82382°W	Roadside	Civil War, Military, Roads
Gettysburg campaign		October 8, 1947	PA 462 (old US 30), John & W Market Sts., W of York; 39.94873°N 76.77977°W	Roadside	Civil War, Military
Gettysburg campaign		November 11, 1947	PA 116 near PA 216, just E of Hanover (at Snyder's of Hanover); 39.80301°N 76.95273°W	Roadside	Civil War, Military
Gettysburg campaign		November 11, 1947	PA 194, just SW of Hanover; 39.793384°N 76.99142°W	Roadside	Civil War, Military
Gettysburg campaign		November 12, 1947	PA 462 (old US 30) at Susquehanna River Bridge, Wrightsville; 39.94744°N 76.78095°W	Roadside	Civil War, Military
Gettysburg Campaign - Raid on Jefferson		June 27, 2009	Town Sq. @ York St. (SR 3041) & Baltimore St. (Rt. 516), Jefferson; 39.8171°N 76.8416°W	Roadside	Cities & Towns, Civil War, Military
Globe Inn		December 15, 1949	SW section of Square, York; 39.96235°N 76.72807°W	City	Buildings, Business & Industry, Inns & Taverns
Golden Plough Tavern		June 23, 1967	462 (W Market St.), just E of Pershing Ave., York; 39.96129°N 76.73148°W	City	Buildings, Business & Industry, Inns & Taverns
Hall & Sellers Press		December 14, 1949	SW corner, Market & Beaver Sts., York; 39.96186°N 76.72992°W	City	Business & Industry
Hanover Junction Railroad Station		May 31, 1953	PA 616, 4 miles S of New Salem at Hanover Junction (off rd. at train station/museum); 39.84329°N 76.77706°W	Roadside	Abraham Lincoln, Civil War, Military, Railroads, Transportation
Jacob L. Devers		June 26, 1999	254 Roosevelt Avenue, York; 39.963°N 76.74134°W	City	Military, Military Post-Civil War
James Smallwood Schoolhouse		May 4, 2002	200 Block of South Pershing Avenue, York; 39.95749°N 76.72982°W	City	African American, Civil Rights, Education
James Smith		December 14, 1949	E. Market St., Presbyterian churchyard, York; 39.96386°N 76.72331°W	City	Government & Politics, Government & Politics 18th Century, Iron, Professions & Vocations
Kilpatrick Headquarters		September 14, 1954	NW section of Square, Hanover; 39.80047°N 76.98377°W	City	Civil War, Military
Major John Clark		December 6, 1949	S. Beaver St. near W. Market St., York; 39.96149°N 76.72989°W	City	American Revolution, Military
Market House		September 14, 1954	NE section of Square, Rt. 94 (Baltimore St.) & Frederick St./Broadway, Hanover; 39.80046°N 76.98284°W	City	Buildings, Business & Industry, Houses & Homesteads, Police and Safety
Mason–Dixon line		May 27, 1970	Rt. 94 at state line 39.72042°N 76.91578°W	Roadside	Early Settlement, Government & Politics 18th Century
Mason–Dixon line		May 27, 1970	PA 74 (MD 165) at State Line; 39.92182°N 76.34297°W	Roadside	Government & Politics, Government & Politics 18th Century
McAllister Tavern		October 6, 1954	Baltimore (PA 94) & Middle Sts., Hanover; 39.78949°N 76.79809°W	City	Buildings, Business & Industry, Inns & Taverns
McClean House		December 15, 1949	NE section of Square, George & Market Sts., York; 39.96269°N 76.72763°W	City	Buildings, Government & Politics, Government & Politics 18th Century, Houses & Homesteads, Professions & Vocations
Penn Common		December 6, 1949	College Ave. at Penn Park, York (MISSING)	City	Government & Politics, Government & Politics 19th Century, William Penn
Philip Livingston		December 14, 1949	N. George St. (Bus. I83) at Prospect Hill Cemetery, York; 39.97297°N 76.73182°W	City	Government & Politics, Government & Politics 18th Century
Phineas Davis		December 6, 1949	NW corner, King & Newberry Sts., York; 39.95887°N 76.73416°W	City	Business & Industry, Transportation
Provincial Courthouse		December 15, 1949	Market & George Sts., SE section of Square, York; 39.9623°N 76.7274°W	City	American Revolution, Government & Politics, Government & Politics 18th Century
Springetsbury Manor		November 20, 1950	PA 624, .1 mile S of Wrightsville; 40.02468°N 76.52708°W	Roadside	Buildings, Government & Politics 17th Century, Mansions & Manors, William Penn
Spurgeon Milton Keeny (1893-1988)		July 17, 1993	155 South Main St., Shrewsbury; 39.76524°N 76.67917°W	City	Ethnic & Immigration, Government & Politics, Government & Politics 20th Century
Susquehanna and Tidewater Canal		April 2, 1948	Long Level Rd.(PA 624), .1 mile S of Wrightsville; 40.02457°N 76.5267°W	Roadside	Canals, Navigation, Railroads, Transportation
Susquehanna and Tidewater Canal		April 2, 1948	Furnace Rd. (PA 425) at York Furnace; 39.84501°N 76.38181°W	Roadside	Canals, Navigation, Railroads, Transportation
Susquehanna and Tidewater Canal		April 2, 1948	PA 624, 1.8 miles NE of Craley; 39.96592°N 76.49015°W	Roadside	Canals, Navigation, Railroads, Transportation
Susquehanna Canal		April 2, 1948	PA 624, 1.8 miles NE of Craley; 39.96592°N 76.4903°W	Roadside	Canals, Navigation, Transportation
Susquehanna Canal		April 5, 1948	Long Level Rd. (PA 624), .1 mile S of Wrightsville (MISSING)	Roadside	Canals, Navigation, Transportation
Susquehanna Canal		April 5, 1948	Furnace Rd. (PA 425) at York Furnace; 39.87516°N 76.38225°W	Roadside	Canals, Navigation, Transportation
Warrington Meetinghouse		July 17, 1947	York St. / Carlisle Rd. (PA 74) at Quaker Meeting Rd., E of Wellsville; 40.05317°N 76.93008°W	Roadside	Houses & Homesteads, Religion
William C. Goodridge		December 17, 1987	123 E. Philadelphia St. (PA 74 & 462), York; 39.96458°N 76.72583°W	City	African American, Business & Industry, Professions & Vocations, Underground Railroad
York		July 17, 1947	1415 E Market St. (PA 462), just W of I-83, York (MISSING); 39.84324°N 76.77706°W	Roadside	Cities & Towns, Government & Politics 18th Century
York		July 17, 1947	US 30 (westbound), just west of I-83, York	Roadside	Cities & Towns, Government & Politics 18th Century
York		July 17, 1947	PA 462 (W Market St.), W of York (MISSING)	Roadside	Cities & Towns, Government & Politics 18th Century
York		July 17, 1947	US 111 (S George St.) & Rathton St., at hospital, York; 39.9452°N 76.72095°W	Roadside	Cities & Towns, Early Settlement, Government & Politics, Government & Politics 18th Century
York County		August 19, 1982	Colonial Courthouse, 205 W. Market St., York; 39.96131°N 76.73176°W	City	Government & Politics, Government & Politics 18th Century
York County Academy		September 16, 1949	N. Beaver St. at building (Missing)	Roadside	Education, Religion
York County Prison		December 6, 1949	NE corner, King & George Sts., York; 39.95887°N 76.3416°W	City	American Revolution, Government & Politics, Government & Politics 18th Century, Military
York House		July 25, 1967	225 E. Market St., York; 39.96397°N 76.72299°W	City	Buildings, Houses & Homesteads, Mansions & Manors, Railroads
York Imperial Apple		April 5, 1948	S. George St. (SR 3001 / old US 111), just S of intersection w/ Old Baltimore Pk. & Monument Rd., ~2 miles S of York; 39.92337°N 76.71844°W	Roadside	Agriculture, Business & Industry
York Inter-State Fair		September 10, 1978	Pa. 462 (W. Market St.) at fairgrounds, York; 39.95424°N 76.75471°W	Roadside	Agriculture, Business & Industry, Sports
York Iron Company Mine		n/a	Hoff Rd., N of Green Valley Rd. (SR 3041) between Seven Valleys & Jefferson, at mine entrance 39.84841°N 76.81222°W	Roadside	Business & Industry, Ethnic & Immigration, Iron, Labor
York Liberty Bell		December 6, 1949	N. Beaver St. near W Gay Ave., in Episcopal Churchyard, York; 39.96919°N 76.73095°W	City	Government & Politics, Government & Politics 18th Century
York Meeting		October 3, 1953	135 W Philadelphia St. (Rts. 74/462) near N Pershing Ave., at meetinghouse, York; 39.96293°N 76.73164°W	City	Buildings, Religion

== See also ==
- List of Pennsylvania state historical markers
- National Register of Historic Places listings in York County, Pennsylvania
