= United Cigar Manufacturing Company building =

- United Cigar Manufacturing Company
- U.S. National Register of Historic Places
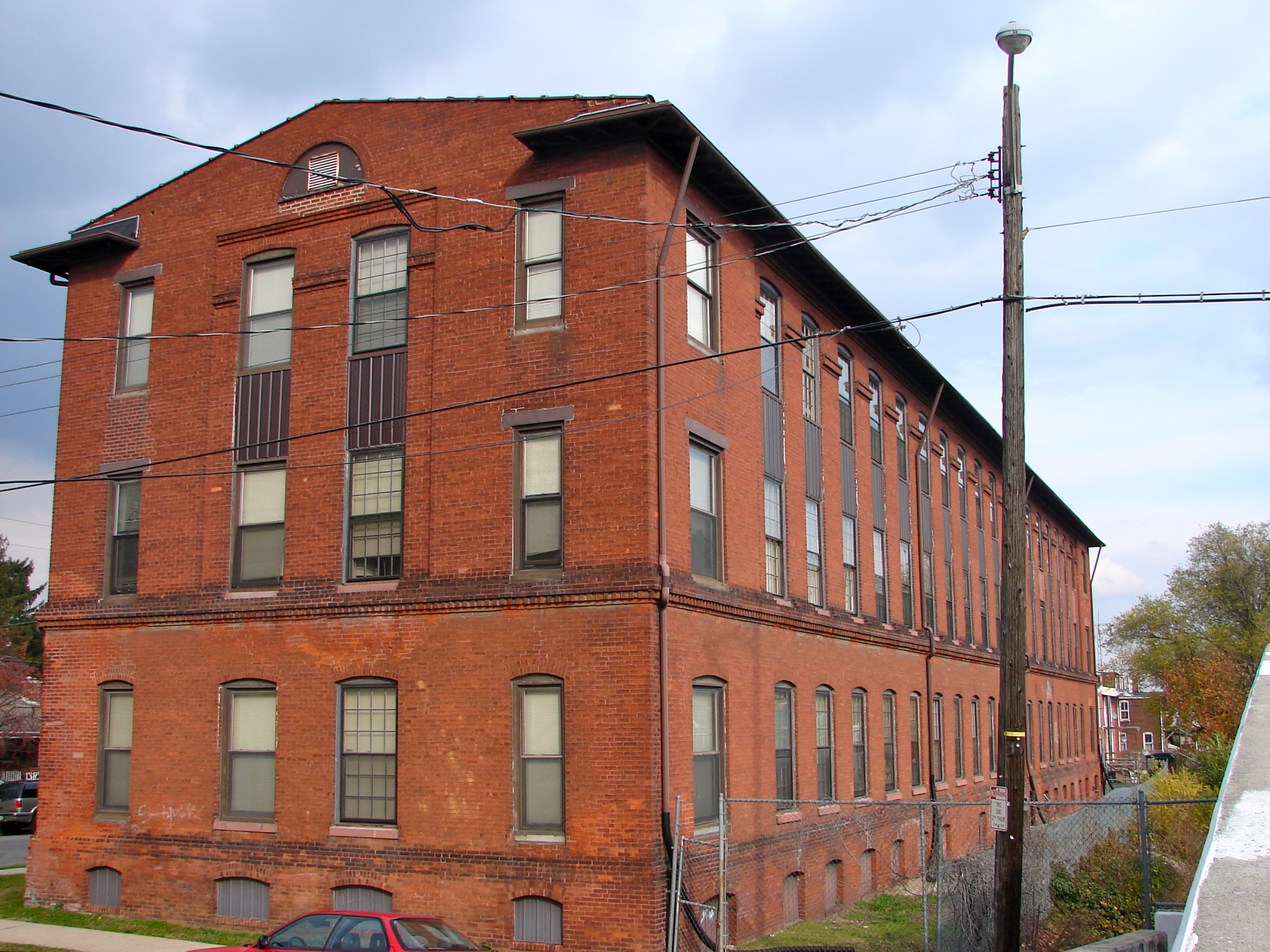
- United Cigar Manufacturing Company, November 2010

- Location within Pennsylvania Location within the United States
- Location: 201 N. Penn St., York, Pennsylvania
- Coordinates: 39°57′45″N 76°44′19″W
- Area: less than one acre
- Built: 1907
- Architectural style: Late Victorian
- NRHP reference No.: 99001289
- Added to NRHP: October 28, 1999

The United Cigar Manufacturing Company building is a historic building that is located in York, York County, Pennsylvania.

== History ==
The building was constructed as a cigar factory in 1907 by the United Cigar Manufacturing Company of New York City.

United Cigar was formed in 1902 by the consolidation of Kerbs, Wertheim & Schiffer; Hirschhorn, Mack & Company; and Stratton & Storm Company. It was subsequently incorporated in New York under the same name in 1906. As of 1907, the company owned and operated nineteen factories in New York, Pennsylvania and New Jersey and manufactured 400 million cigars annually for the wholesale market. It became the General Cigar Company about 1917.

The cigar factory was operated for an undetermined period as the York City Cigar Company. After 1932, the building housed printers and clothing manufacturers and is currently used as an apartment building.

The building was added to the National Register of Historic Places in 1999.

== Construction ==
This three-story, brick building sits on a stone foundation and has a low-pitched gable roof. The main facade is eighteen bays wide and has a four-bay-wide, one-bay-deep, center pavilion. The building measures 174 feet wide by forty-one feet deep.

== See also ==
- National Register of Historic Places listings in York County, Pennsylvania
