= The York Dispatch =

Newspaper published in York, Pennsylvania

- Type: Daily newspaper
- Owner: Gannett
- Founder: Hiram Young
- Founded: 1876
- Language: English
- Headquarters: York, Pennsylvania
- Sister newspapers: York Daily Record
- OCLC number: 11148520
- Website: yorkdispatch.com

The York Dispatch is a morning newspaper serving the people of York County, Pennsylvania. The paper is printed in a broadsheet format and published Monday through Friday, with the exception of certain holidays.

Founded by Hiram Young in 1876 as The Evening Dispatch, it is the oldest newspaper still published in York County, Pennsylvania. The newspaper was aligned with Republican politics for about 115 years. Gannett bought the Dispatch in mid-2015.

The Dispatch is in a joint operating agreement with the York Daily Record. The newspapers are to return to more independent operations after the agreement expires in June 2024. The York Dispatch is the former publisher of the York Sunday News.

In December 2025, the newspaper announced it will be merged into the Daily Record.

The York Dispatch Newspaper Offices building was listed on the National Register of Historic Places in 1978.
