= Billmeyer House =

Historic house in Pennsylvania, United States

- U.S. National Register of Historic Places
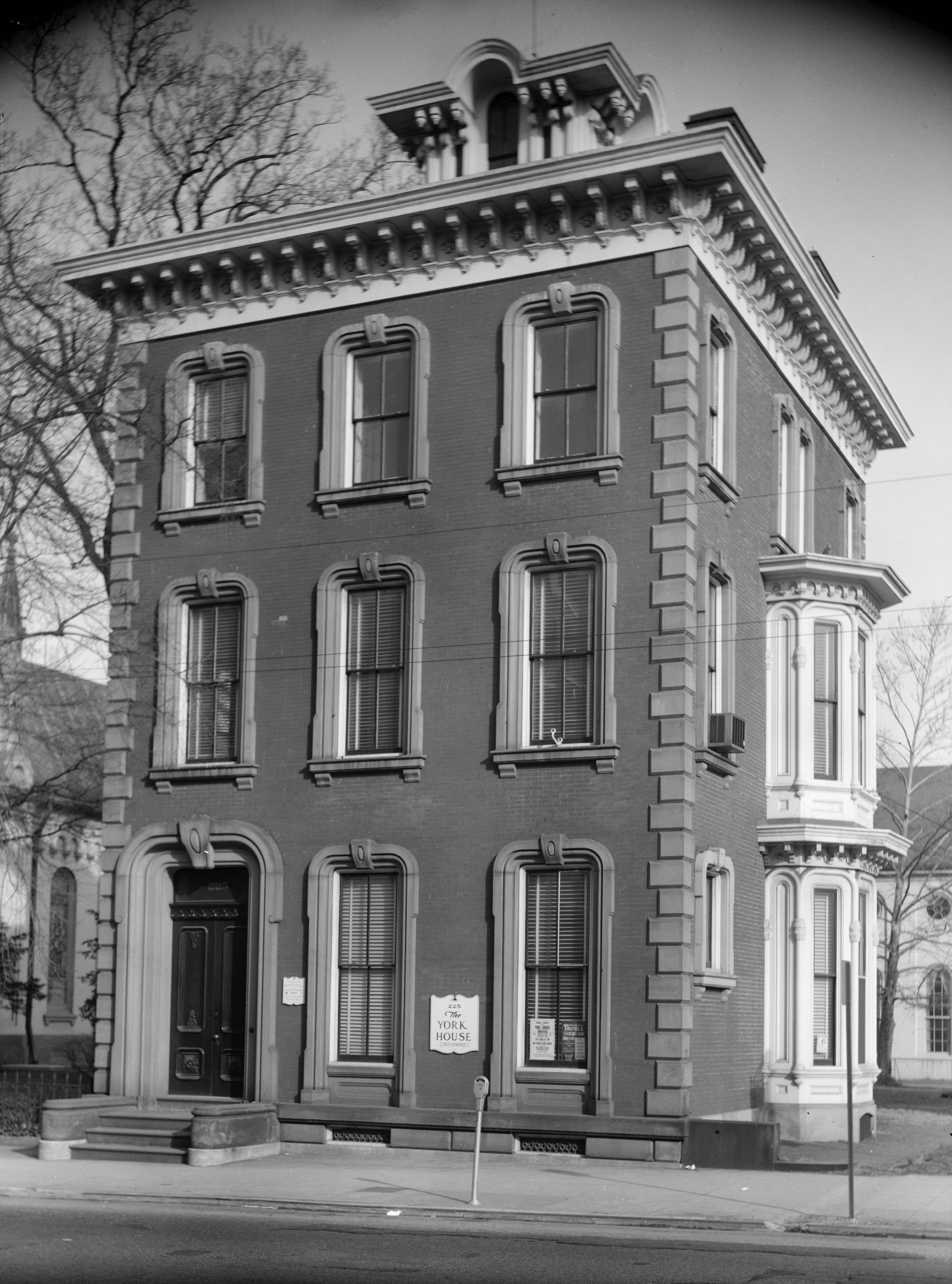
- Billmeyer House, March 1963

- Location within Pennsylvania Location within the United States
- Location: E. Market St., York, Pennsylvania
- Coordinates: 39°57′51″N 76°43′23″W
- Area: 0.1 acres (0.040 ha)
- Built: 1860
- Architect: Billmeyer, Charles
- Architectural style: Italian Villa
- NRHP reference No.: 70000557
- Added to NRHP: November 10, 1970

The Billmeyer House, also known as York House, is a historic home located at York, Pennsylvania, York County, Pennsylvania. It was built in 1860, and is a three-story, brick Italian Villa style dwelling. It consists of a "head house" with rear wing, and topped by flat roof with a 10 feet square cupola. The interior features a parlor ceiling and walls decorated by noted artist Filippo Costaggini (1839–1904).

It was added to the National Register of Historic Places in 1970.

== See also ==
- National Register of Historic Places listings in York County, Pennsylvania
