= York Dispatch Newspaper Offices =

- U.S. National Register of Historic Places
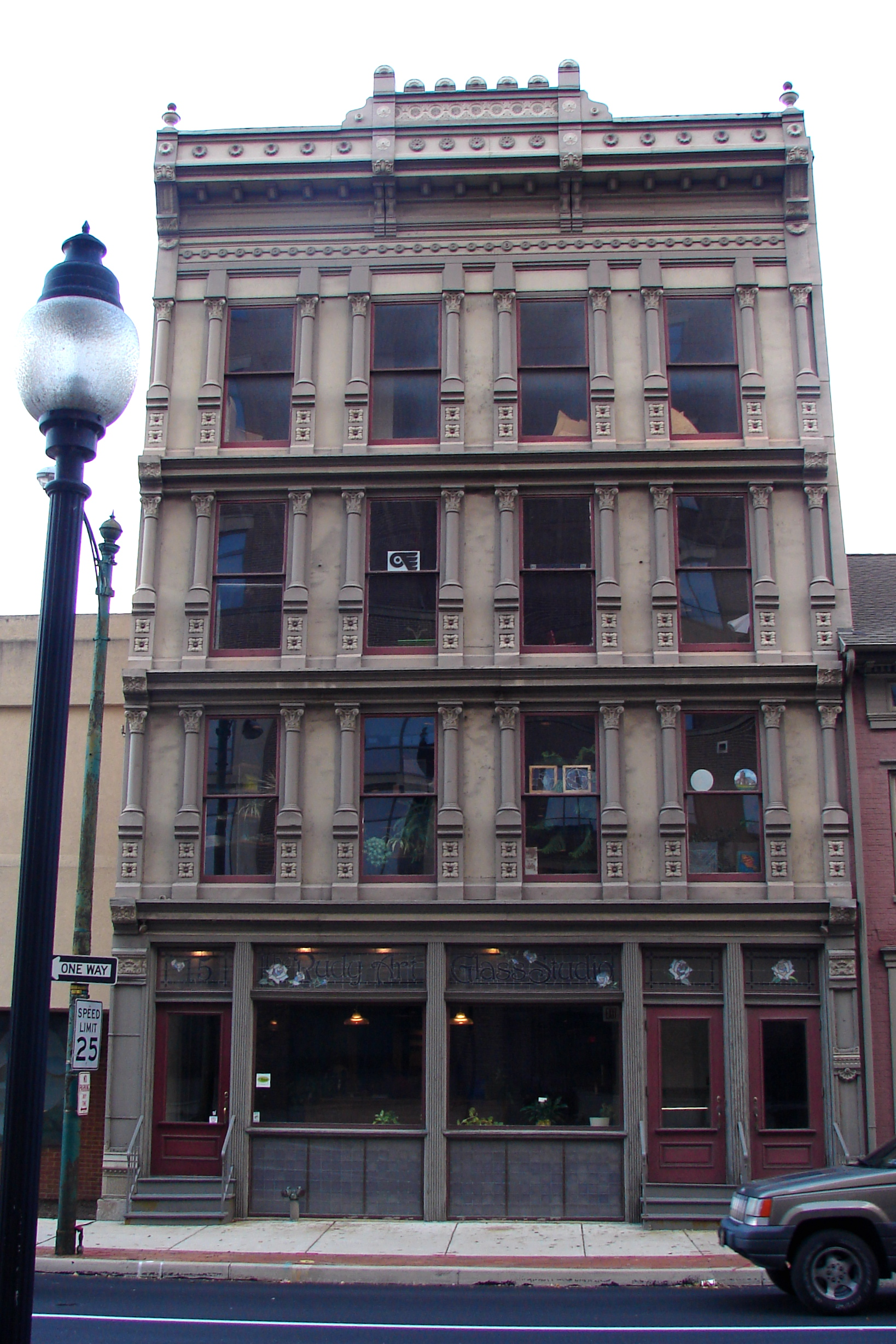
- York Dispatch Newspaper Offices, November 2010

- Location within Pennsylvania Location within the United States
- Location: 15 and 17 E. Philadelphia St., York, Pennsylvania
- Coordinates: 39°58′24″N 76°43′41″W
- Area: 0.2 acres (0.081 ha)
- Built: 1887
- Architect: Mesker, George L.
- Architectural style: Italianate Revival
- NRHP reference No.: 78002489
- Added to NRHP: March 8, 1978

The York Dispatch Newspaper Offices is an historic commercial building that is located in York, Pennsylvania, York County, Pennsylvania, United States.

It was added to the National Register of Historic Places in 1978.

== History and architectural feature ==
Built in 1887, this historic structure is a four-story, four-bay brick building that was designed in the Italianate Revival style and was used as the office space of the editors and reporters employed by The York Dispatch newspaper.

The building consists of two independent sections connected by an overhead walkway. The front facade was built using cast iron and pressed metal and features decorative pilasters and long, slender windows.

== See also ==
- National Register of Historic Places listings in York County, Pennsylvania
