= Laurel–Rex Fire Company House =

- U.S. National Register of Historic Places
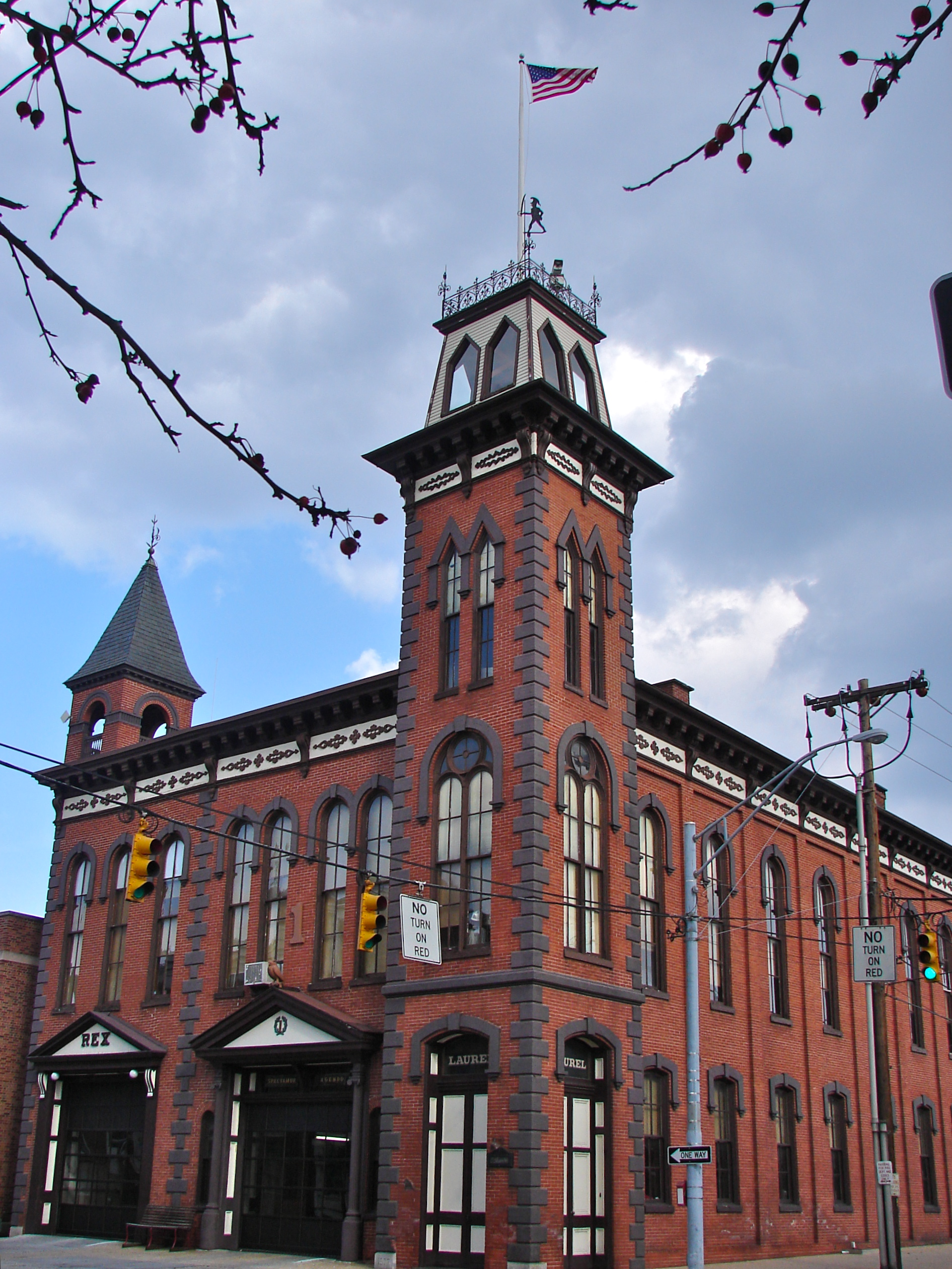
- Laurel–Rex Fire Company House, November 2010

- Location within Pennsylvania Location within the United States
- Location: S. Duke St., York, Pennsylvania
- Coordinates: 39°57′42″N 76°43′31″W
- Area: 1 acre (0.40 ha)
- Built: 1878, 1887, 1892
- Architectural style: Italianate
- NRHP reference No.: 76001683
- Added to NRHP: October 8, 1976

The Laurel–Rex Fire Company House, consisting of the Laurel Fire Company's engine house and the Rex Hook & Ladder Company's truck house, is a historic fire station located in York City, York County, Pennsylvania. The oldest building, the Laurel engine house, was built in 1878, and is a two-story, brick building in the Italianate style. The original engine house was expanded in 1887 with a horse stable and in 1892 with a ladder truck house. It has a three-story bell tower on the southwest corner and a second faux tower atop the roof on the northwest corner. It measures 48 by 96 feet (15 by 29 m).

It was added to the National Register of Historic Places in 1976.

== Laurel Engine House ==
On Thursday May 10, 1877, at a meeting of the Laurel Fire Company, the contract for the construction of the Laurel engine house was awarded to Philip H., Schnable and Harrison Stair for $6,780. Both men were active members of the fire company.

At the June 1877 meeting of the Laurel Fire Company, H.P. Schnable notified the Laurel that the firm of Schnable and Stair had been dissolved. By unanimous vote of the members in attendance the Laurel awarded the contract to build the engine house to Harrison Stair. Stair submitted his bond to the Laurel and a crew began tearing down the old building standing on the lot to prepare the lot for construction.

On Tuesday evening, July 24, 1877, a ceremonial laying of the cornerstone was held at the construction site for the Laurel engine house. The ceremony was opened with music from Professor Kissinger's Worth Infantry Band, followed by a prayer from Reverend J. O. Miller, D.D. James B. Ziegler, Esq., President of the Laurel Fire Company, delivered the address, followed by the laying of the cornerstone in place. Reverend Doctor Miller again addressed the crowd, and the band played again as the crowd dispersed.

On Saturday November 17, 1877, the Little General weather vane was relocated to the tower of the Laurel's new engine house.

On February 22, 1878, the new Laurel engine house was completed and occupied.

On Thursday May 2, 1878, the Laurel engine house was dedicated with a grand parade and a ceremony at the new engine house, followed by a banquet on the second floor of the fire station. At 9:00 p.m. a grand reception soiree was held in the hall on the second floor. Approximately 80 couples attended the dance.

The new Laurel engine house was situated on the northeast corner of South Duke Street and East King Street. The engine house was 33 feet wide on the Duke Street side, 80 feet on the King Street side, and had an open yard of 33 by 50 feet. The main building is 42 feet tall, and a tower, 12 feet square, stands 57 feet tall to the top of the brick work, with a wood belfry of 19.5 feet, atop which was a flag pole of 35.5 feet. The tower projects 24 inches from the main building on both sides. The building was painted a light stone color, with the hoods, quoins and cornice painted an imitation of brown sandstone. Two double doors enter the tower on the west and south sides, a double door was on the south side of the building near the southeast corner of the building, and on the east side a double door on the northern half opened into the yard. Mr. Beaton Smith was the architect.

On the interior of the building, on the ground floor was an apparatus room with 15 foot high ceilings, The walls were covered with plaster with a sand finish, laid off in courses of ashlar. The walls had four foot high wainscoting. Running down the center of the room was a girder supported by two Corinthian columns. Behind the apparatus room was a parlor or meeting room, 19.5 feet by 32 feet, separated from the apparatus room by a partition wall. The floor was covered by a Brussels carpet. At the rear of the parlor was a door leading to the lobby at the King Street exterior door, and a stairway led to the second floor from the lobby.

On the second floor, was a large hall, 30 by 70 feet with 18 foot ceilings. The walls were finished with a plaster cornice, and the ceiling had three plaster center pieces from which three chandeliers were to be hung. A small ante room in the tower provided access to a stage at the west end of the hall. At the east end of the hall was a small room that could serve as a cloakroom or dressing room.

== Laurel Stables ==
In January 1886, the members of the Laurel erected horse stalls in the apparatus room for the purpose of acquiring horses for the company. By January 18, 1886, the Laurel had acquired a pair of iron-gray horses for use by the company. On Friday, March 12, 1886, the members of the Laurel agreed to purchase two large bay horses from Mr. Ben Kendig after testing the horses and finding them satisfactory.

On Thursday, March 11, 1886, the Laurel received permission to remove the columns running down the center of the apparatus room that support a beam in the ceiling, and to replace the columns with trusses, to make more room for using their newly acquired horses to pull the fire apparatus. The request was approved by the Town Council.

In late February 1887, the Laurel had built temporary stables onto the rear of the Engine house until permanent stables would be built around them. They also removed the horse stalls from the apparatus room of the engine house. The two arched doorways to the apparatus room on the front facade were replaced by a single rectangular doorway.

== Rex Truck House ==
The first truck house for the Rex Hook and Ladder Company was built in the 100 block of East Market Street, and was occupied on Tuesday July 26, 1887. It was a frame building, 16 feet wide and 65 feet deep.

By 1891, the Rex was in need of new quarters. The truck house on East Market Street was too small, and could not be properly heated. The stable was without sufficient light or proper ventilation, and was damp. The horses contracted a chronic cough.

On July 7, 1891, the city passed an ordinance that, in part, authorized "six thousand, two hundred and fifty dollars; -for the erection of a building on South Duke Street, on lot adjoining the Laurel Fire Company building, for the use of the Rex Hook and Ladder Company", Common Council Bill No. 28, authorizing the building of a truck house for the Rex Hook and Ladder Company passed on August 10, 1891. The Select Council passed the bill on September 1, 1891.

At a meeting of the Fire Committee on September 3, 1891, plans submitted by architect Dempwolf were accepted by the committee, and a notice to contractors to bid was approved. The truck house would be 21 feet wide, with a truck room 56 feet deep and stables 24 feet deep. The front was designed to look as a continuation of the Laurel engine house, and a small turret on the roof to conform with the laurel's tower.

Four contractors submitted bids to construct the building. The Fire Committee awarded the contract to Jacob Seachrist & Son for $3,300. Work was expected to commence the following week.

The first meeting of the Rex Hook & Ladder Company in their new home was held on Wednesday, February 24, 1892. Two double doors and a small entrance door opened into the apparatus room, 60 feet long and 19 feet wide. The walls and ceiling were of a block sanded finish, and were wainscoted on the first floor. At the rear, an arch traversing the width of the apparatus room leads to the horse stalls, with two stalls and the ability to add a third stall. The stables were 20 feet deep.

On the second floor was the meeting room or parlor, 52 feet long, 19 feet wide and 19 feet high, the walls and ceiling finished in white. The room was prepared to have two sets of chandeliers installed. To the rear of the hall was the driver's room, a small room for the department's alarm battery, and a passage to the roof.

On Memorial Day, Monday May 30, 1892, the Rex truck house was officially dedicated, along with the dedication of the Rex's new Hayes aerial ladder truck and the Laurel's new LaFrance steam fire engine. A parade was held upon the streets of York, followed by a demonstration of the Rex's new Hayes aerial ladder truck in the square, and a banquet later that evening in the Laurel engine house. The dedication ceremony, originally planned to take place in the morning prior to the parade, was postponed due to rain and conducted after the banquet that evening.

== Changes To The Buildings ==
On May 17, 1883, during a regular meeting of the Laurel Fire Company, an order of $8.00 was granted to F. H. Heckert for the installation of a bathroom in the engine house.

On August 5, 1884, during a regular meeting of the Laurel Fire Company, a motion is passed authorizing the installation of electric lights in the engine house. Lights were installed by 1886.

In the fall of 1893, the facade of the Rex was altered to enlarge the bay door. The small entrance door was removed from the front of the building.

In March and April 1895, carpenters remodeled the rear of the Laurel engine house. The second floor above the horse stalls was raised several feet, and a section of the second floor, 15 by 20 feet was partitioned off to provide a sleeping room for the drivers.

In July 1895, Spangler Brothers, contractors and builders of East York, completed renovations to the Rex truck house. Most of the wood work on the first floor was replaced, including rotten and decaying flooring and joists. The stables were set back even with the Laurel's engine house, enlarging the apparatus room by twenty feet. A large skylight was placed over the stables.

In 1906, the Laurel engine house was outfitted to be heated by steam.

On Friday December 20, 1907, the Rex Hook and Ladder Company was instructed by the Fire Committee not to respond to fire calls with the exception of a large fire in the business section of the city. The condition of the flooring in the Rex was so bad that the horses were to be carefully walked outside, the apparatus pulled out of the station by hand, and the horses hitched to the ladder truck outside to respond to a fire. A new asphalt floor was not completed until Monday, January 20, 1908. The Rex ladder truck was stored in a temporary frame and canvas structure erected on Duke Street until the floor was completed.

In January 1914, the stables of the Laurel engine house were being renovated, and a new wood block flooring was being laid in the stables. The horses were temporarily quartered in the Keystone stables at Queen and King Streets. The Laurel would be delayed in answering alarms as they had to bring the horses back to the engine house to answer alarms.

In July 1940, a new frame belfry was constructed on top of the tower of the Laurel station. The belfry was painted a cream color, and the wrought iron work was re-attached to the top. The Little General weather vane was also returned to the top of the tower. The work was performed by a crew of Works Progress Administration (WPA) workers. New window sills and a new exterior paint job followed that summer.

On Monday, March 11, 1957, city workers cut a doorway between the Laurel and Rex fire stations. Prior to that, firemen would have to walk around the exterior of the building to go from one station to the other.

== Fires and Other Incidents ==
On Wednesday, March 13, 1912, at about 5:45 p.m., an electric wire running to the tower of the Laurel engine house snagged on a guard of the Rex truck house, causing a fire on the roof of the Rex station. A hole of about 4 inches in diameter was burned in the roof.

On Thursday June 19, 1913, at about 10:15 p.m. fire was discovered in the frame hayloft located to the rear of the stables of the Laurel and Rex fire houses. The fire started in the floor area of the Rex loft, at the north end of the structure, among the bailed hay and loose straw. The fire extended to a frame back building at 117 East King Street. Lost in the fire was six tons of hay, seven tons of straw, a number of ladders, hay forks, stable tools and about $1,000 worth of fire hose.

On the evening of Wednesday April 2, 1919, a chimney fire occurred at the Laurel station. Accumulated soot in the chimney was ignited by heat from the steam plant. The Laurel firemen extinguished the fire.

On Tuesday August 26, 1924, at 8:24 p.m. Laurel Driver Edward Kroll was in front of the station when the apparatus room lights got unusually bright, and then the power went out. Kroll saw that the lights in the adjoining Rex station were still lit. Just then a man came running to the station to report that the building was on fire. Fireman John "Gummy" Blymire was ill with heart disease and was sleeping in the bedroom when he awoke to smoke filling the room. Driver Kroll saw flames shooting from the windows of the tower, and sounded the alarm. He then pulled out the Laurel's rig and began to fight the fire. The fire damaged the tower, including a number of items being stored in the tower. The fire, caused by a short circuit, caused several thousand dollars in damage. The Laurel, Vigilant Union, Rescue and Rex fire companies responded. Fireman Paul Kennedy received a hand injury while fighting the fire.

On Wednesday October 1, 1947, shortly after noon, a fire was discovered on the roof of the Rex truck house. Workmen from the General Roofing Company had just broke for lunch, as they were in the process of replacing the roof on the Rex station. The fire was extinguished in several minutes and the damage was negligible.

On Wednesday, July 1, 1987, at about 6:00 p.m. the flag pole atop the tower of the Laurel engine house was struck by lightning. The 35 foot fir pole was split in half, with a section the size of a two-by-four falling to the street.

== See also ==
- National Register of Historic Places listings in York County, Pennsylvania
- Laurel-Rex fire station web site
