= James L. Smallwood =

American educator (1845–1885)

- Born: 1845; Mulberry Ward, Philadelphia, U.S.
- Died: November 3, 1885 (aged 39–40)
- Education: Institute for Colored Youth
- Occupation: Educator
- Era: Reconstruction
- Mother: Lydia Smallwood

James L. Smallwood (1845–1885) was an American educator and barber who was born in Mulberry Ward, Philadelphia.

Smallwood was both the first African-American juror in York County, Pennsylvania, and the founder of the James Smallwood Schoolhouse in York, Pennsylvania. He was also one of the original charter members of Lebanon Cemetery in York, as well as an active member of the African Methodist Episcopal Zion Church.

Smallwood died on November 3, 1885, due to paralysis.

== Early life and education ==
Born in 1845 in Mulberry Ward, Philadelphia, to mother Lydia Smallwood, James L. Smallwood grew up with two sisters (Lydia Smallwood, Mary A.C. Smallwood Gray) and three brothers. One of the brothers became a private secretary for former Supreme Court Justice Salmon P. Chase.

Smallwood attended the Institute of Colored Youth and graduated in 1864.

== Career and life ==
Smallwood was one of the original charter members of Lebanon Cemetery, located in North York, Pennsylvania. Due to cemeteries in York originally only allowing Whites to be buried there, cemeteries for African Americans and other people of color were located outside of the city.

Smallwood was a member of the African Methodist Episcopal Zion Church. Smallwood worked with the church on multiple occasions including speaking at the celebration of the 16th anniversary of the organization that ran Sunday school for the church. In addition, Smallwood also ran events such as performances by young church members

He was the first African-American juror in York County, Pennsylvania. The case was Chambers v Hess (1878), with the charge Fornication & Bastardy. The Defendant (Milton Chambers) was ultimately found guilty.

=== James L. Smallwood Schoolhouse ===
Smallwood became an educator in 1867 at a segregated school in York, Pennsylvania.

In 1871, Smallwood opened the first school for African Americans in York, now known as the James L. Smallwood Schoolhouse. The school was founded through a partnership with the local chapter of the African Methodist Episcopal Zion Church. Smallwood often received praise for his work as a successful educator in his field, and for the work that his students and school did.

The School was located in several different locations ranging from a room in the local chapter of the African Methodist Episcopal Zion Church to a building opened in 1892, named in memory of Smallwood. This building was located near the intersection of S. Pershing Avenue and W. College Street in York, and it stayed open until the 1960s when York City schools were desegregated.

==== Historical Marker ====
The site where the school was located was deemed a historical site in Pennsylvania on May 4, 2002.

The marker has text saying: "Built in 1892, this school was part of a movement to create schools for the education of black students by black teachers, and is representative of the national struggle for equal education, regardless of race. Named in memory of James Smallwood, elected teacher of the city's first 'colored school' in 1871."
