= Warrington Township, York County, Pennsylvania =

Township in Pennsylvania, US

Coordinates: 40°05′00″N 76°56′59″W

- Township
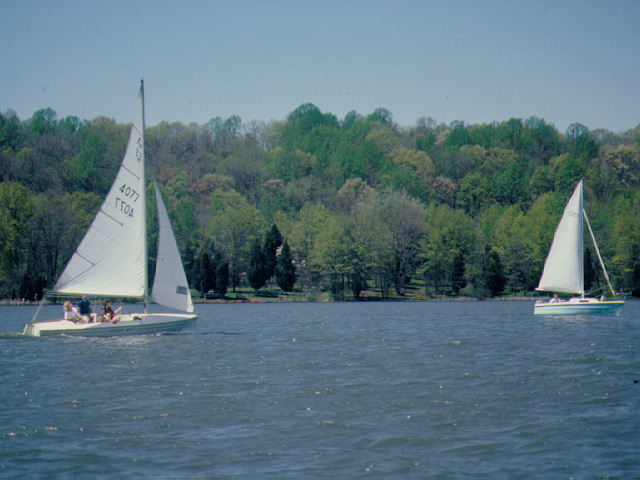
- Gifford Pinchot State Park is in Warrington Township

- Location in York County and the state of Pennsylvania.
- Country: United States
- State: Pennsylvania
- County: York
- Settled: 1735
- Incorporated: 1744

Government
  - Type: Board of Supervisors

Area
  - Total: 36.10 sq mi (93.50 km^{2})
  - Land: 35.30 sq mi (91.42 km^{2})
  - Water: 0.80 sq mi (2.08 km^{2})

Population (2020)
  - Total: 4,548 ▲
  - Estimate (2023): 4,611
  - Density: 130.1/sq mi (50.25/km^{2})
- Time zone: UTC-5 (Eastern (EST))
  - Summer (DST): UTC-4 (EDT)
- Area code: 717
- FIPS code: 42-133-81056

Historical population
Census	Pop.	Note	%±
1930	1,349		—
1940	1,520		12.7%
1950	1,806		18.8%
1960	2,041		13.0%
1970	2,494		22.2%
1980	3,586		43.8%
1990	4,275		19.2%
2000	4,435		3.7%
2010	4,532		2.2%
2020	4,548		0.4%
2023 (est.)	4,611		1.4%
U.S. Decennial Census

Warrington Township is a township in York County, Pennsylvania, United States. The population was 4,548 at the 2020 census. The township is named after Warrington, England, like many townships having English names in York County. Others dispute the origin, believing it may be named after Waringstown, County Down, now in Northern Ireland.

== History ==
The Warrington Meetinghouse was added to the National Register of Historic Places in 1975.

== Geography ==
According to the United States Census Bureau, the township has a total area of 36.0 square miles (93 km^{2}), of which 35.4 square miles (92 km^{2}) is land and 0.6 square miles (1.6 km^{2}), or 1.75%, is water. The township completely surrounds the borough of Wellsville.

== Demographics ==
As of the census of 2000, there were 4,435 people, 1,702 households, and 1,329 families living in the township. The population density was 125.4 inhabitants per square mile (48.4/km^{2}). There were 1,766 housing units at an average density of 49.9 per square mile (19.3/km^{2}). The racial makeup of the township was 98.47% White, 0.23% African American, 0.11% Native American, 0.43% Asian, 0.07% from other races, and 0.70% from two or more races. Hispanic or Latino of any race were 1.04% of the population.

There were 1,702 households, out of which 32.6% had children under the age of 18 living with them, 67.9% were married couples living together, 6.3% had a female householder with no husband present, and 21.9% were non-families. 16.2% of all households were made up of individuals, and 5.1% had someone living alone who was 65 years of age or older. The average household size was 2.59 and the average family size was 2.89.

In the township the population was spread out, with 23.8% under the age of 18, 6.6% from 18 to 24, 30.9% from 25 to 44, 29.3% from 45 to 64, and 9.4% who were 65 years of age or older. The median age was 40 years. For every 100 females, there were 99.5 males. For every 100 females age 18 and over, there were 101.4 males.

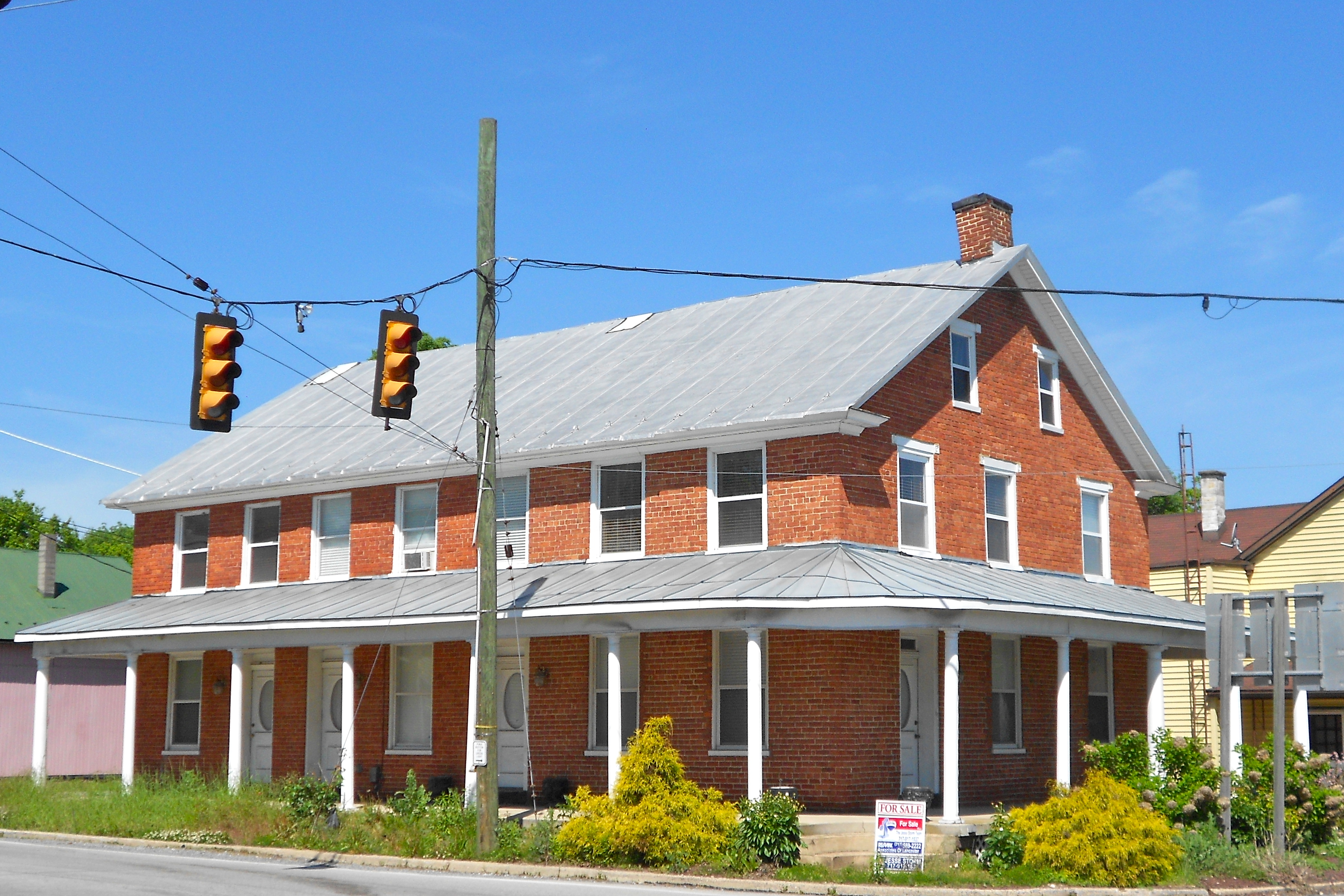
Building in Rossville

The median income for a household in the township was $47,425, and the median income for a family was $51,941. Males had a median income of $37,940 versus $26,203 for females. The per capita income for the township was $21,368. About 1.5% of families and 2.6% of the population were below the poverty line, including 0.5% of those under age 18 and 5.2% of those age 65 or over.
