= Forry House =

Historic house in Pennsylvania, United States

- U.S. National Register of Historic Places
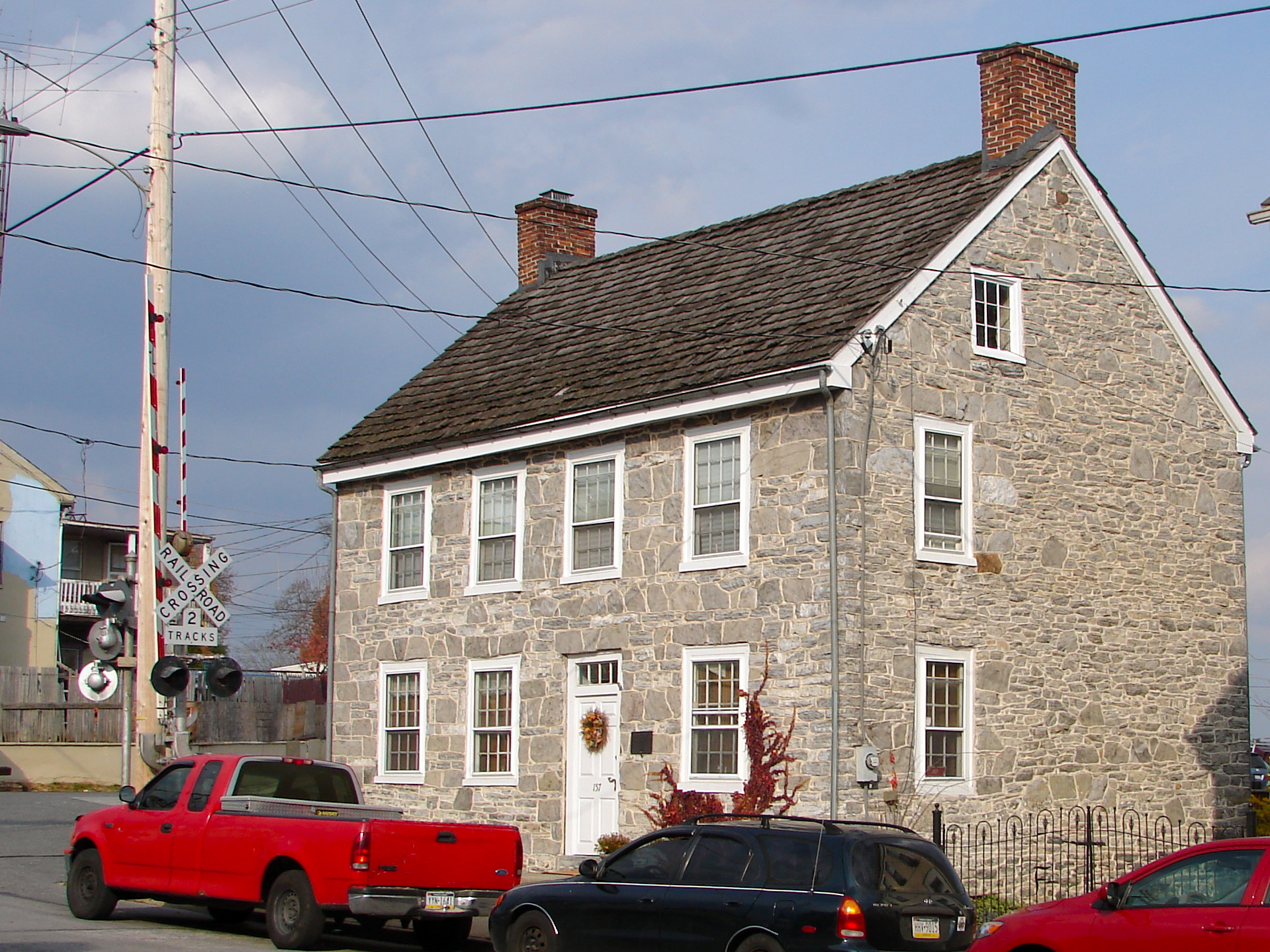
- Forry House, November 2010

- Location within Pennsylvania Location within the United States
- Location: 149 N. Newberry St., York, Pennsylvania
- Coordinates: 39°57′46″N 76°44′9″W
- Area: 0.5 acres (0.20 ha)
- Built: 1809
- Built by: Forry, Rudolph
- NRHP reference No.: 77001208
- Added to NRHP: December 27, 1977

Forry House is a historic home located at York, York County, Pennsylvania. Built in 1809 by Rudolph Forry, it is a 2 1/2-story, limestone dwelling with a gable roof and two gable end brick chimneys.

It was added to the National Register of Historic Places in 1977.
