= York Armory =

- U.S. National Register of Historic Places
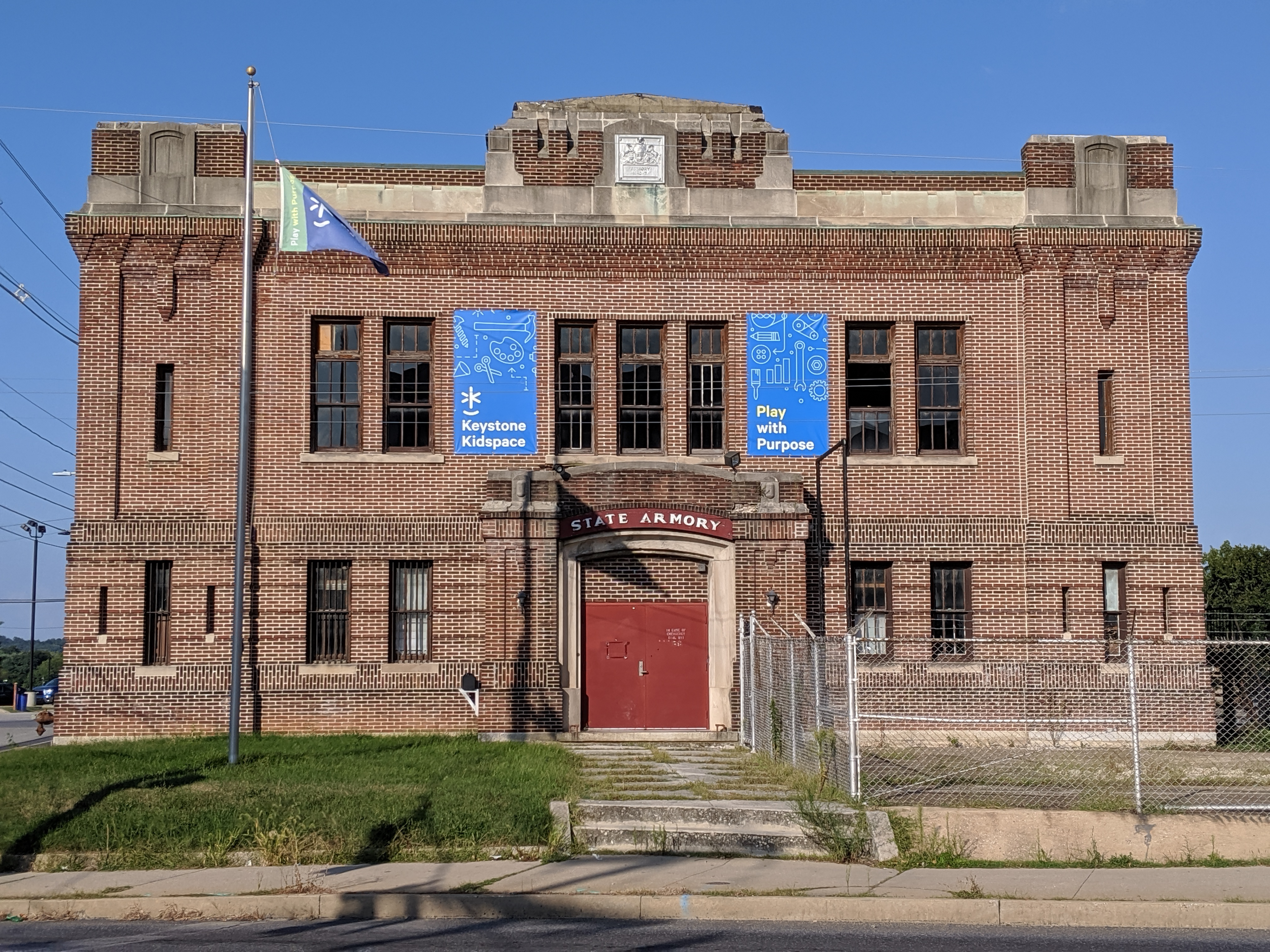

- Location within Pennsylvania Location within the United States
- Location: 369 N. George St. York, Pennsylvania
- Coordinates: 39°58′7″N 76°43′50″W
- Area: 0.7 acres (0.28 ha)
- Built: 1913
- Architect: McCormick & French
- Architectural style: Late Gothic Revival
- MPS: Pennsylvania National Guard Armories MPS
- NRHP reference No.: 90000421
- Added to NRHP: April 18, 1990

The York Armory is an historic National Guard armory that is located in York, York County, Pennsylvania.

It was added to the National Register of Historic Places in 1989.

== History and architectural features ==
Built in 1913, this historic structure is a two-story brick building that was designed in the Late Gothic Revival style and measures five bays by six bays in size. The drill hall is located on the second floor above the administrative area. A brick maintenance shop was added behind the building in the 1950s.
