= North Codorus Township, Pennsylvania =

Township in Pennsylvania, US

Coordinates: 39°50′00″N 76°52′35″W

- Township
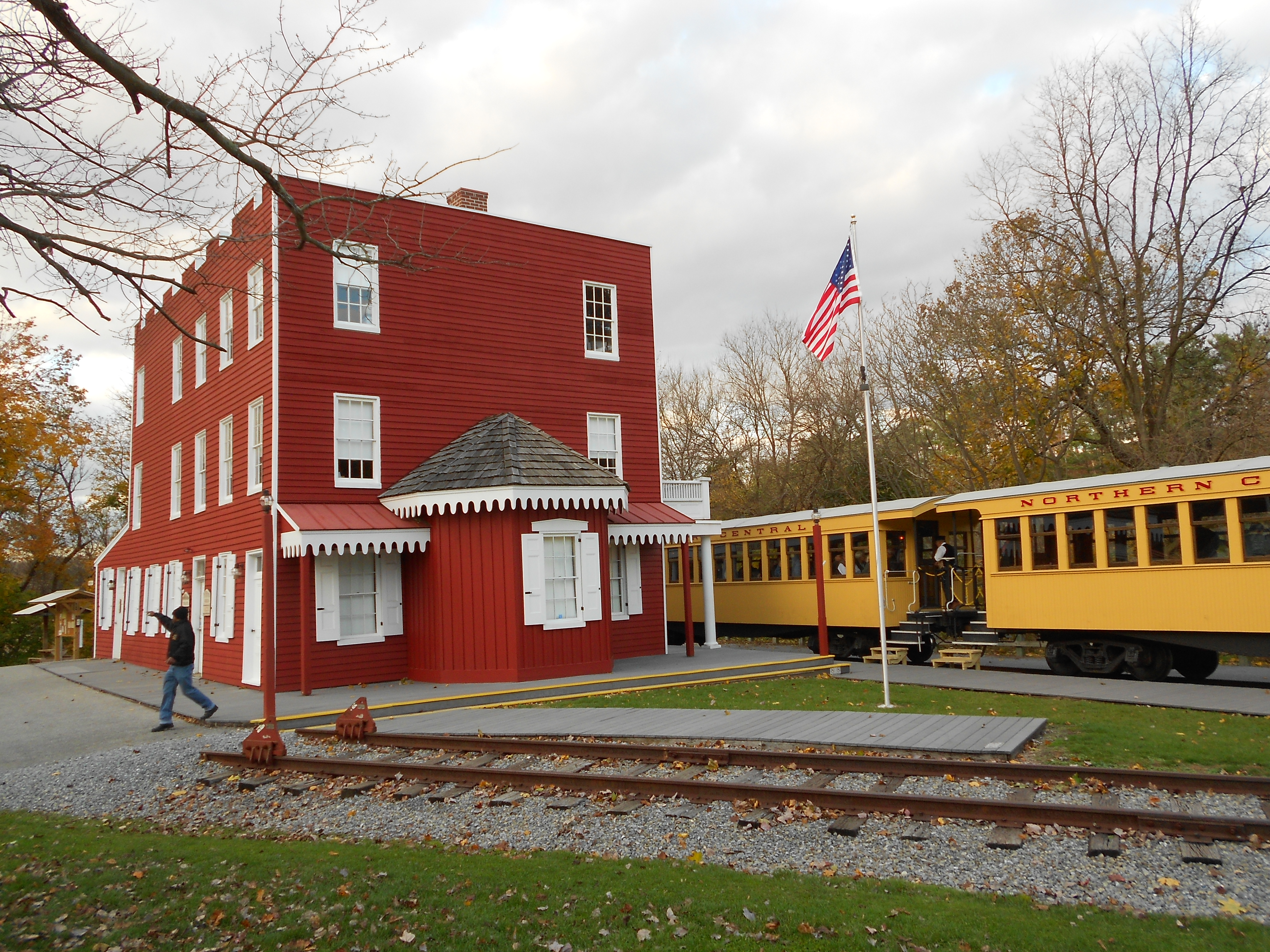
- Railroad station at Hanover Junction

- Location in York County and the state of Pennsylvania.
- Country: United States
- State: Pennsylvania
- County: York
- Settled: 1832
- Incorporated: 1838

Government
  - Type: Board of Supervisors

Area
  - Total: 32.29 sq mi (83.63 km^{2})
  - Land: 32.22 sq mi (83.44 km^{2})
  - Water: 0.073 sq mi (0.19 km^{2})

Population (2020)
  - Total: 9,153 ▲
  - Estimate (2023): 9,226
  - Density: 280.4/sq mi (108.28/km^{2})
- Time zone: UTC-5 (Eastern (EST))
  - Summer (DST): UTC-4 (EDT)
- Area code: 717
- FIPS code: 42-133-54904
- Website: https://northcodorustwp.org/

Historical population
Census	Pop.	Note	%±
2000	7,915		—
2010	8,905		12.5%
2020	9,153		2.8%
2023 (est.)	9,226		0.8%
U.S. Decennial Census

North Codorus Township is a township in York County, Pennsylvania, United States. The population was 9,153 at the 2020 census.

== History ==
North Codorus Township was split off from Codorus Township, Pennsylvania in 1840.

The Hanover Junction Railroad Station, Howard Tunnel, Northern Central Railway, and York Iron Company Mine are listed on the National Register of Historic Places.

On September 17, 2025, Matthew Ruth, shot five police officers, killing three, while serving an arrest warrant. He was later shot and killed by police.

== Geography ==
According to the United States Census Bureau, the township has a total area of 32.4 square miles (84 km^{2}), of which 32.3 square miles (84 km^{2}) is land and 0.1 square miles (0.26 km^{2}), or 0.22%, is water. The township surrounds the borough of New Salem.

== Demographics ==
As of the census of 2000, there were 7,915 people, 2,924 households and 2,356 families living in the township. The population density was 244.8 inhabitants per square mile (94.5/km^{2}). There were 2,987 housing units at an average density of 92.4 per square mile (35.7/km^{2}). The racial makeup of the township was 98.28% White, 0.28% African American, 0.10% Native American, 0.21% Asian, 0.43% from other races, and 0.69% from two or more races. Hispanic or Latino of any race were 0.92% of the population.

There were 2,924 households, out of which 35.2% had children under the age of 18 living with them, 71.9% were married couples living together, 5.8% had a female householder with no husband present, and 19.4% were non-families. 15.4% of all households were made up of individuals, and 5.5% had someone living alone who was 65 years of age or older. The average household size was 2.69 and the average family size was 3.00.

In the township the population was spread out, with 24.7% under the age of 18, 6.6% from 18 to 24, 30.4% from 25 to 44, 27.6% from 45 to 64, and 10.7% who were 65 years of age or older. The median age was 39 years. For every 100 females there were 102.2 males. For every 100 females age 18 and over, there were 100.2 males.

The median income for a household in the township was $48,315, and the median income for a family was $51,677. Males had a median income of $40,279 versus $25,326 for females. The per capita income for the township was $19,912. About 2.6% of families and 3.8% of the population were below the poverty line, including 1.9% of those under age 18 and 12.1% of those age 65 or over.
