= Spring Grove Borough Historic District =

Historic district in Pennsylvania, United States

- U.S. National Register of Historic Places
- U.S. Historic district
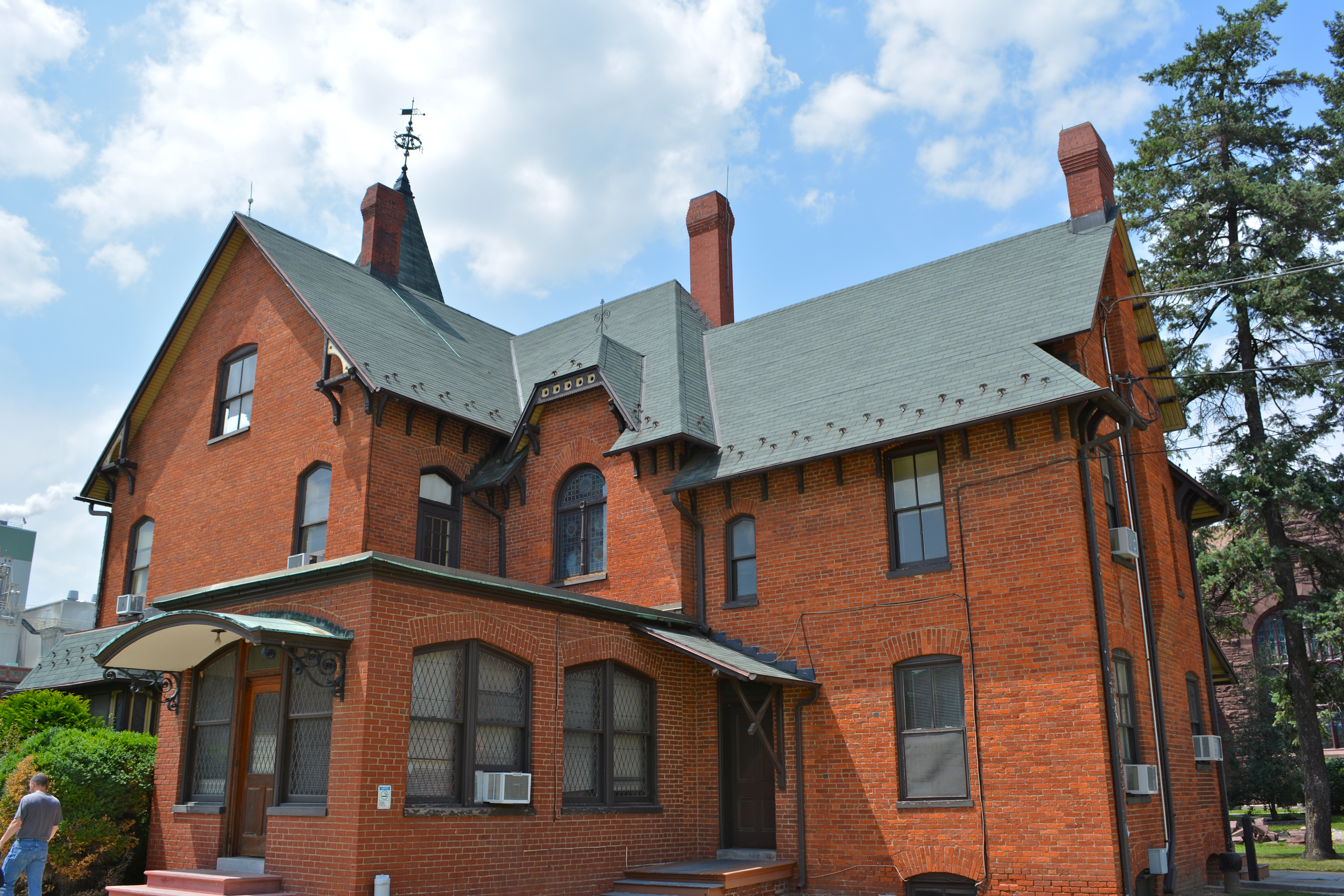
- Glatfelter House on Main Street

- Location within Pennsylvania Location within the United States
- Location: Roughly bounded by College Ave., Jackson, Water, East, and Church Sts., Spring Grove, Pennsylvania
- Coordinates: 39°52′25″N 76°51′55″W
- Area: 48.8 acres (19.7 ha)
- Architectural style: Queen Anne, Italianate, Georgian
- NRHP reference No.: 84003608
- Added to NRHP: May 25, 1984

The Spring Grove Borough Historic District is a national historic district that is located in Spring Grove Borough in York County, Pennsylvania.

It was listed on the National Register of Historic Places in 1984.

== History and architectural features ==
This district includes 199 contributing buildings that are located in the central business district and surrounding residential areas of the paper mill borough of Spring Grove. Most of the buildings date between 1880 and 1900, and include notable examples of the Queen Anne, Georgian Revival, and Italianate styles.

== Gallery ==
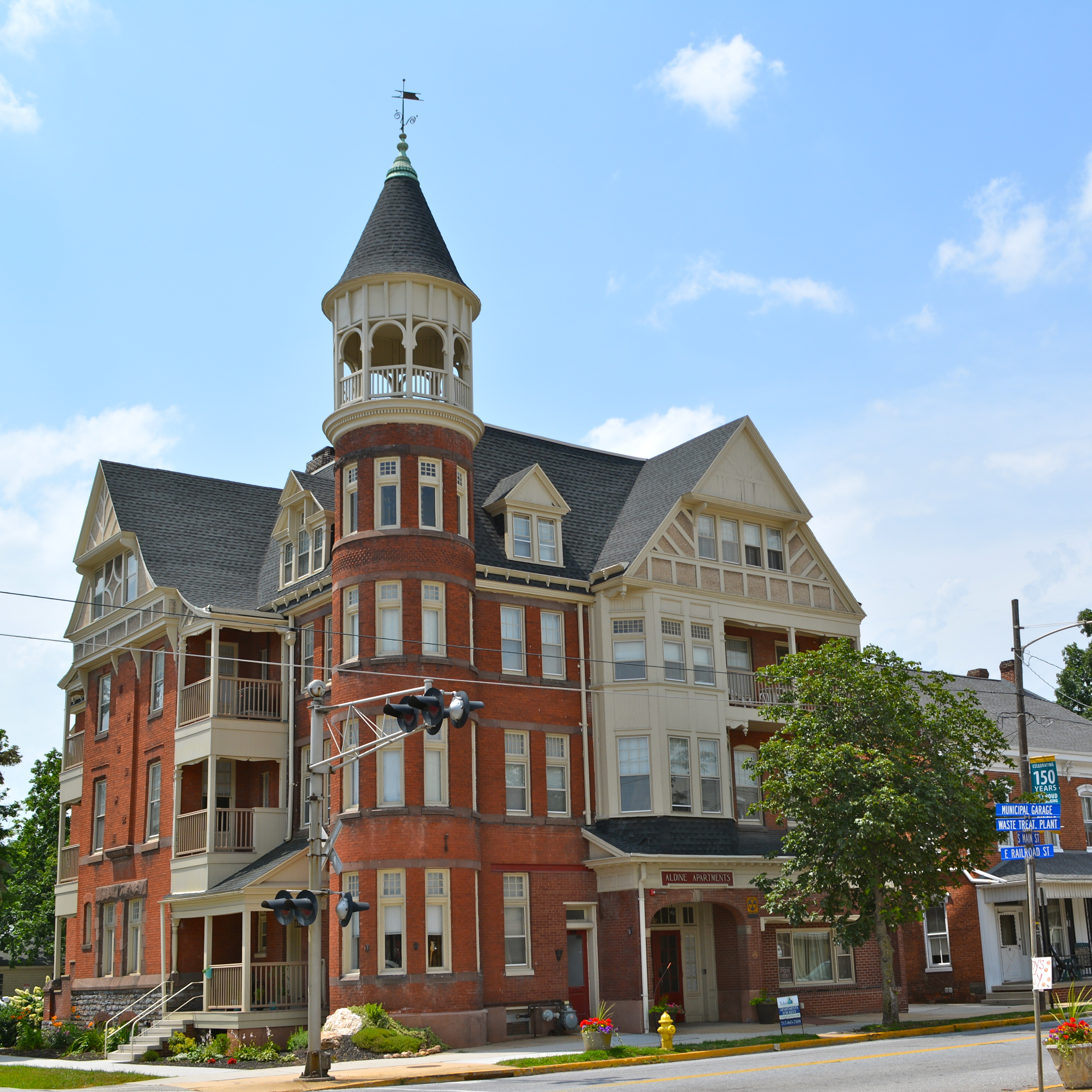
Aldine Apartments

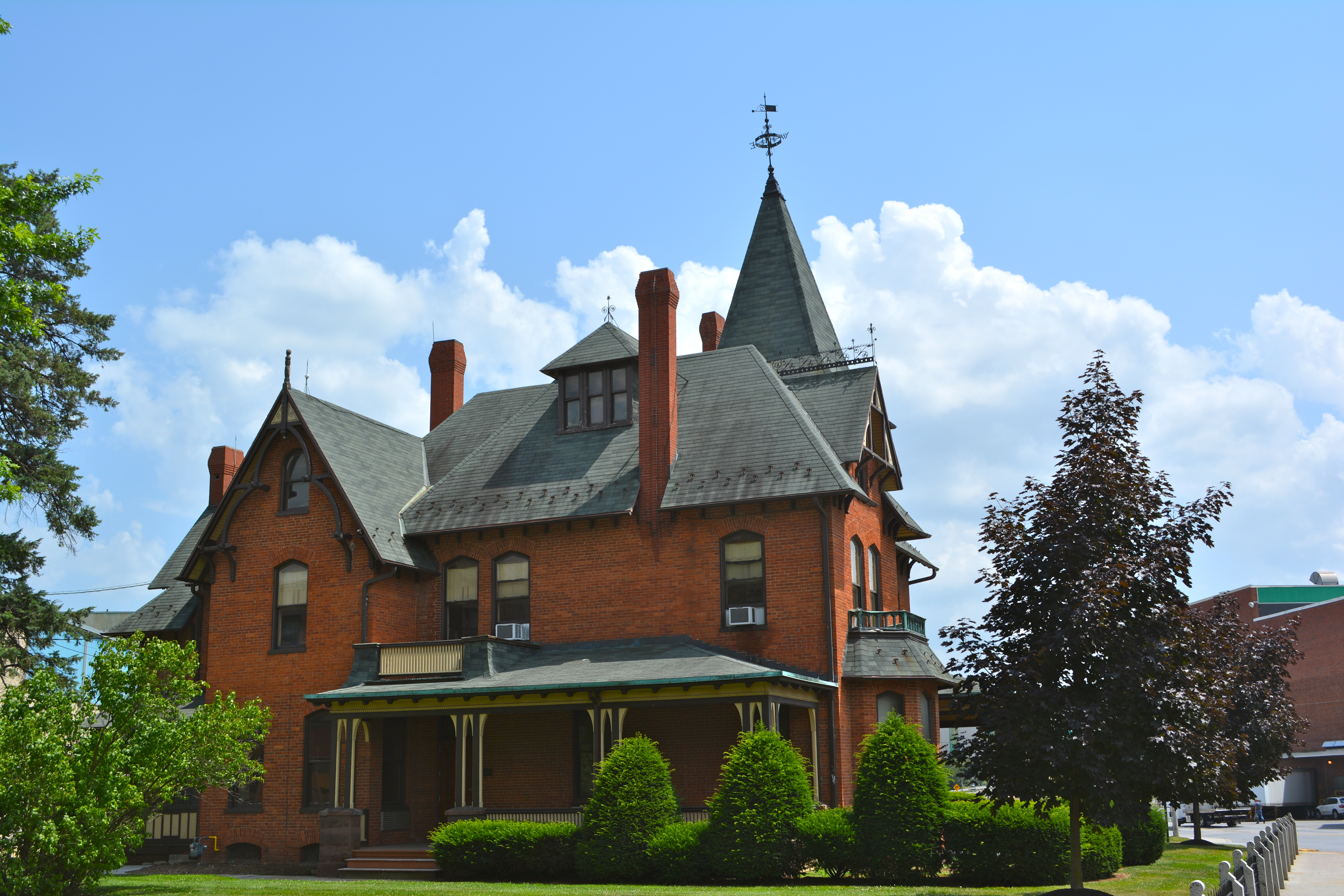
Glatfelter house

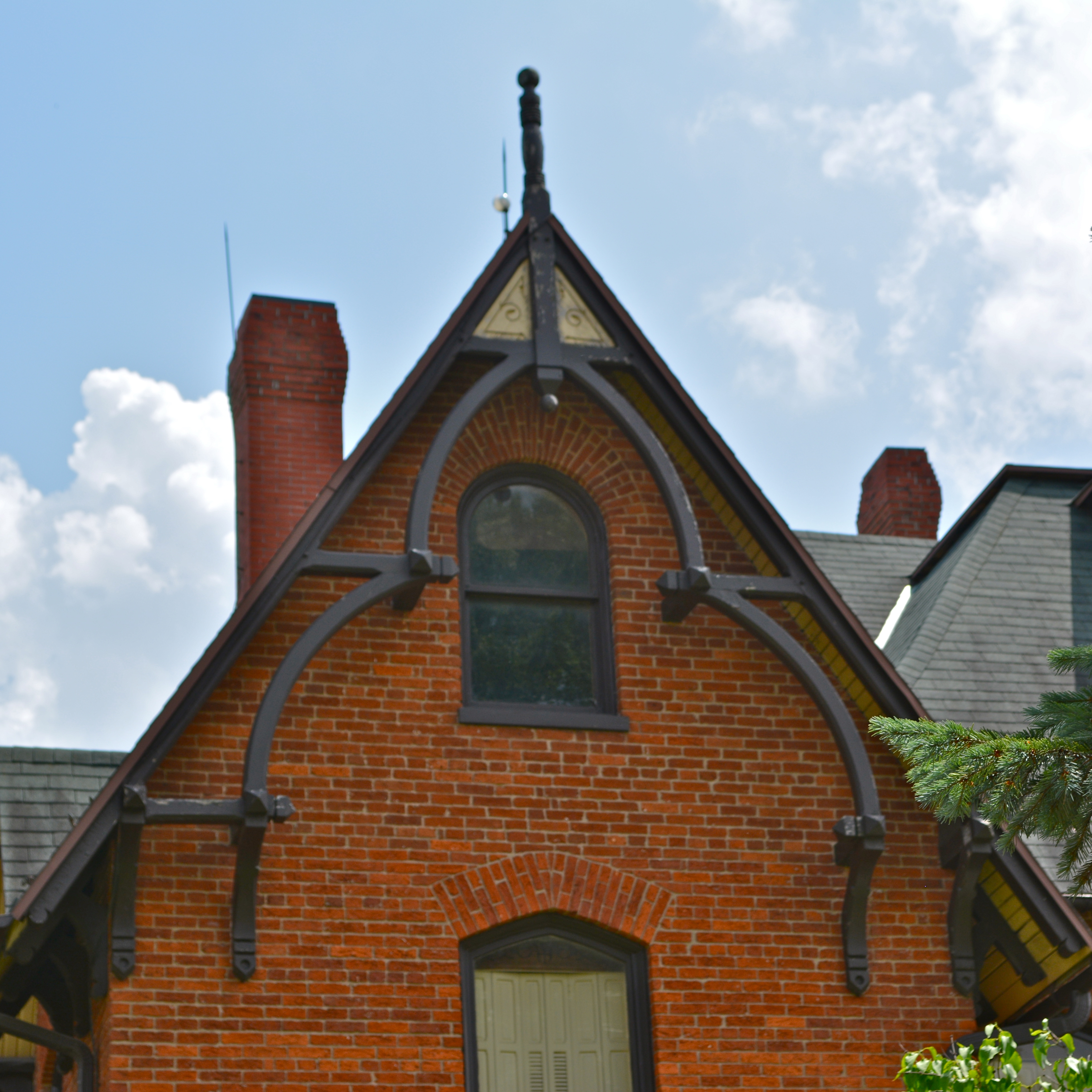
Gable of the Glatfelter house

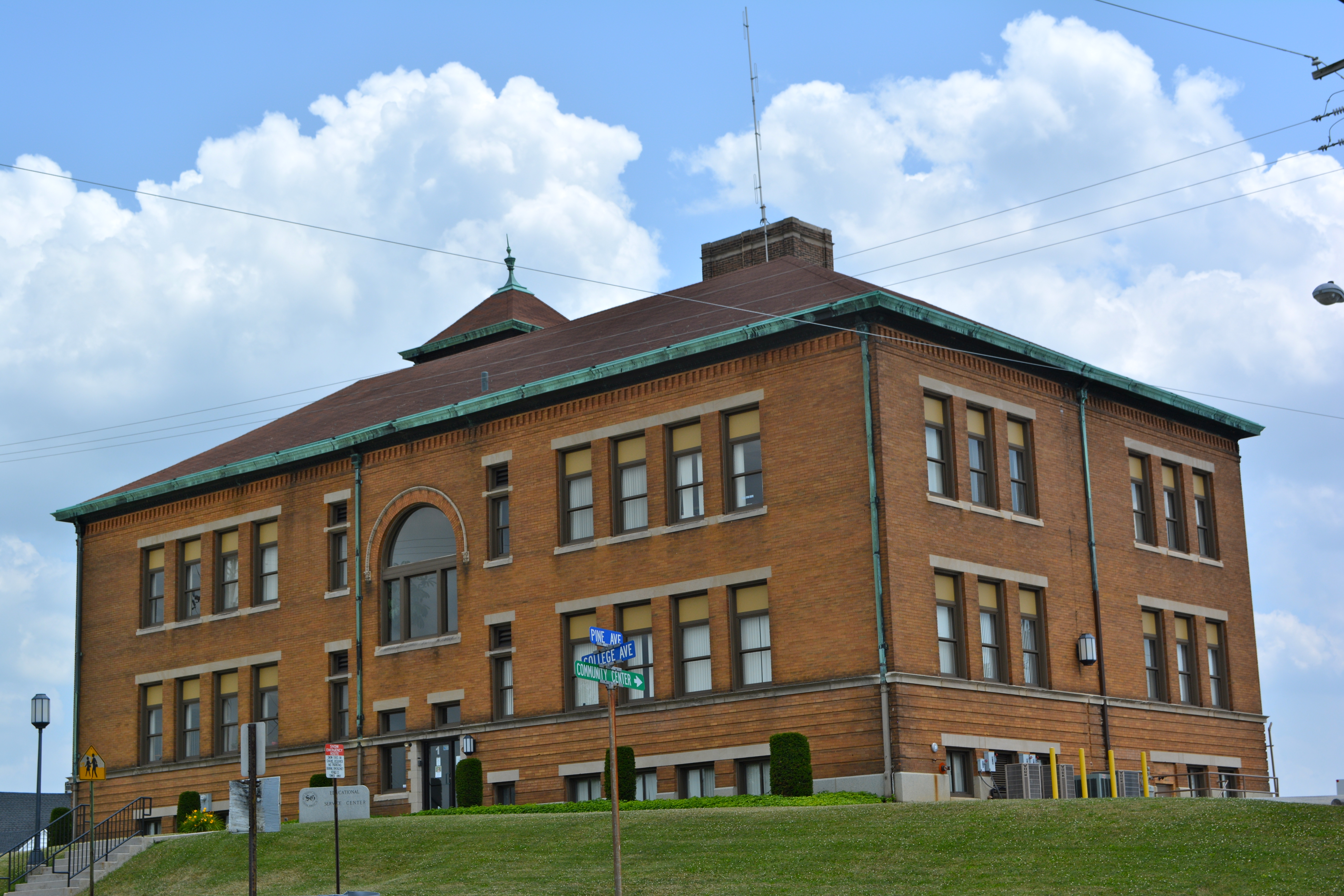
School on East Street

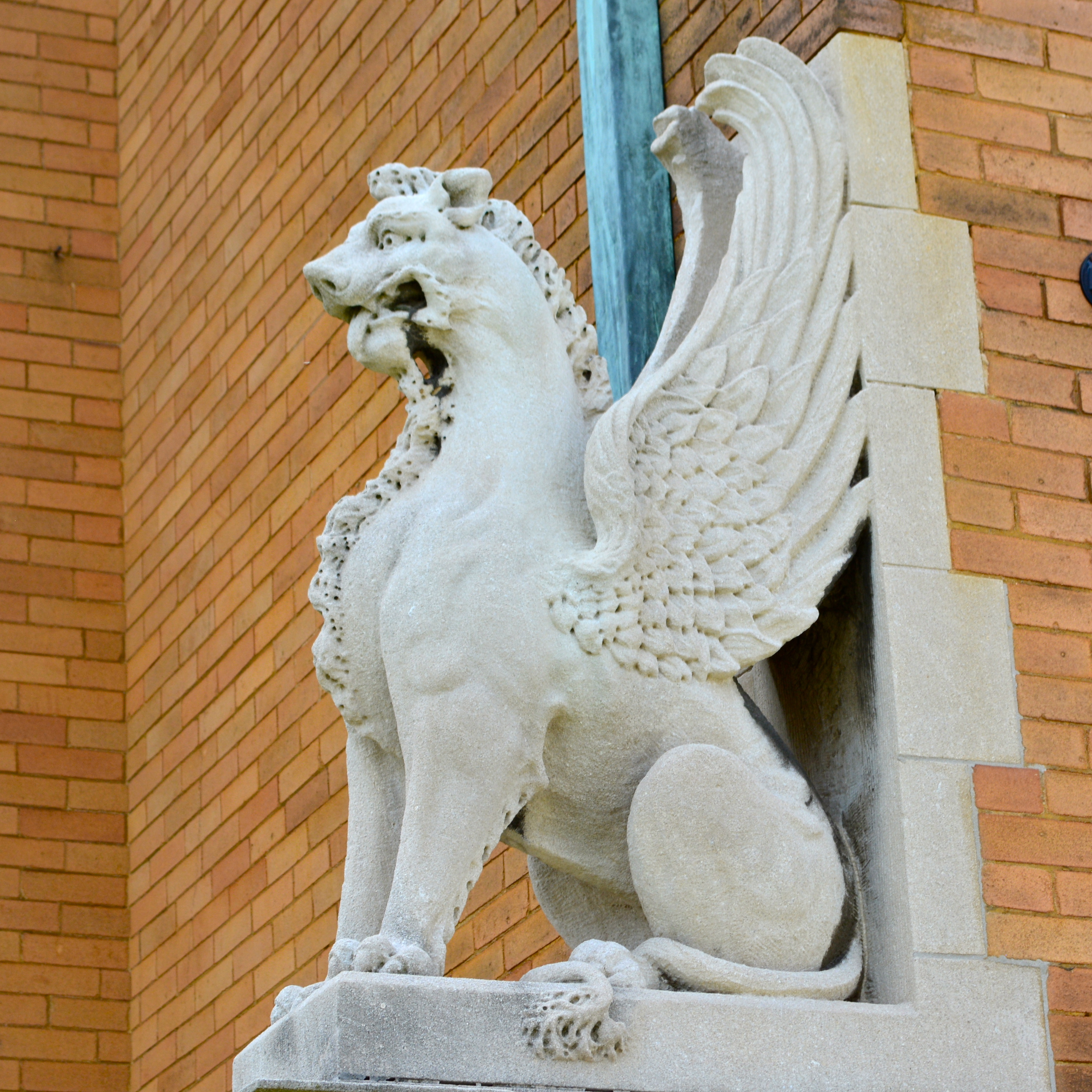
Griffen at the East Street school

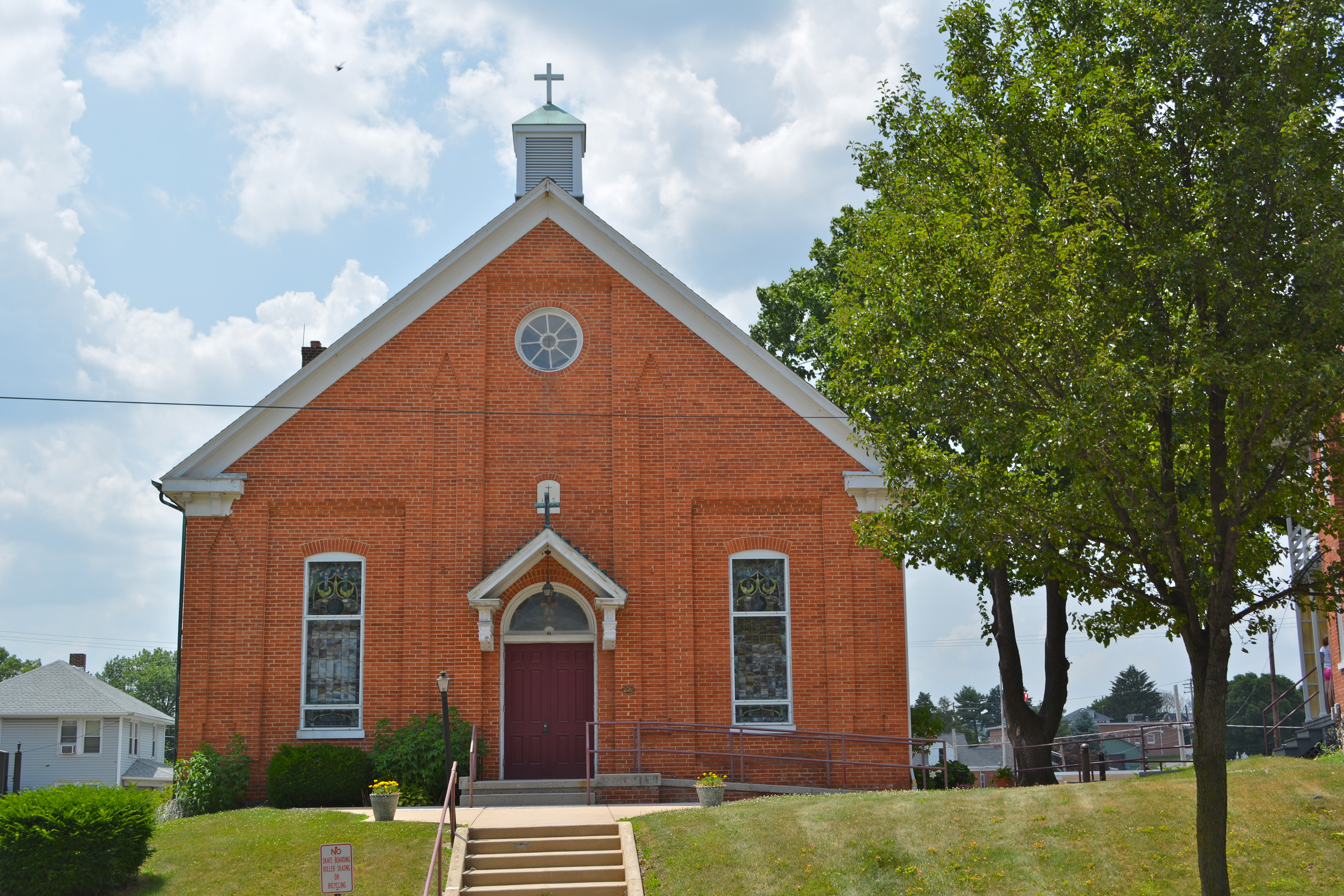
Sacred Heart Church on Main Street
