= Farmers Market (York, Pennsylvania) =

- U.S. National Register of Historic Places
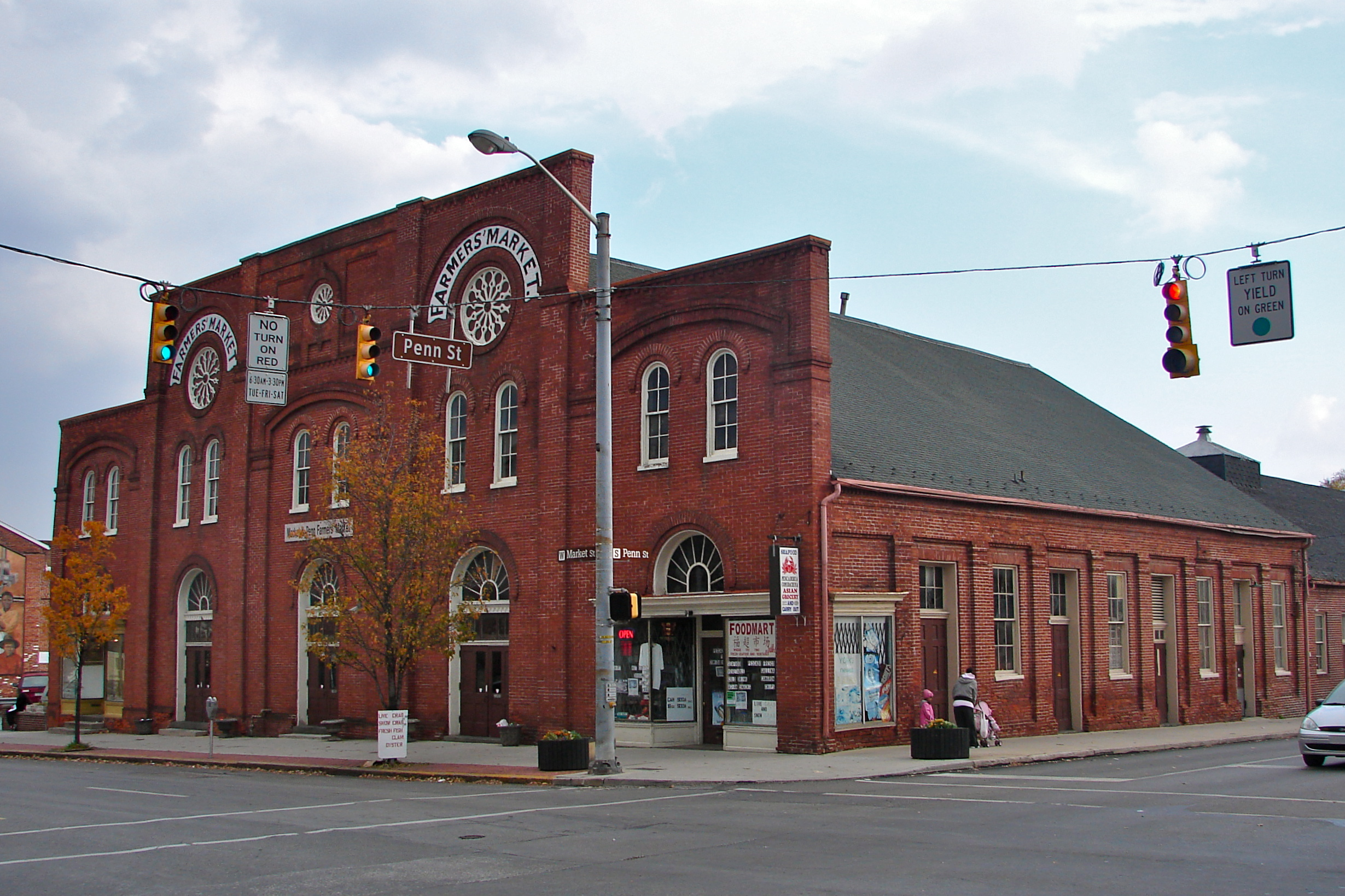
- Farmers Market, November 2010

- Location within Pennsylvania Location within the United States
- Location: 380 W. Market St., York, Pennsylvania
- Coordinates: 39°57′33″N 76°44′13″W
- Area: 0.6 acres (0.24 ha)
- Built: 1876, c. 1890
- Architectural style: Queen Anne
- NRHP reference No.: 77001207
- Added to NRHP: November 25, 1977

Farmers Market, more commonly called Penn Market and also known as York Farmers' Market or Market & Penn Street Farmers' Market, is a historic public market located in York, Pennsylvania. It was built in 1876 and expanded about 1890. The original section is a simple 60 feet wide and 80 feet long gable roofed brick building. A 40 foot wide rectangular section was added in the expansion, and the two sections were joined under a single, moderately pitched gable roof. With the expansion, a five bay wide false front was added to unify the building. The front facade features two ornamental circular windows. Attached to the main building are three auxiliary buildings, including a Queen Anne style stable.

It was added to the National Register of Historic Places in 1976.
