= Northwest York Historic District =

Historic district in Pennsylvania, United States

- U.S. National Register of Historic Places
- U.S. Historic district
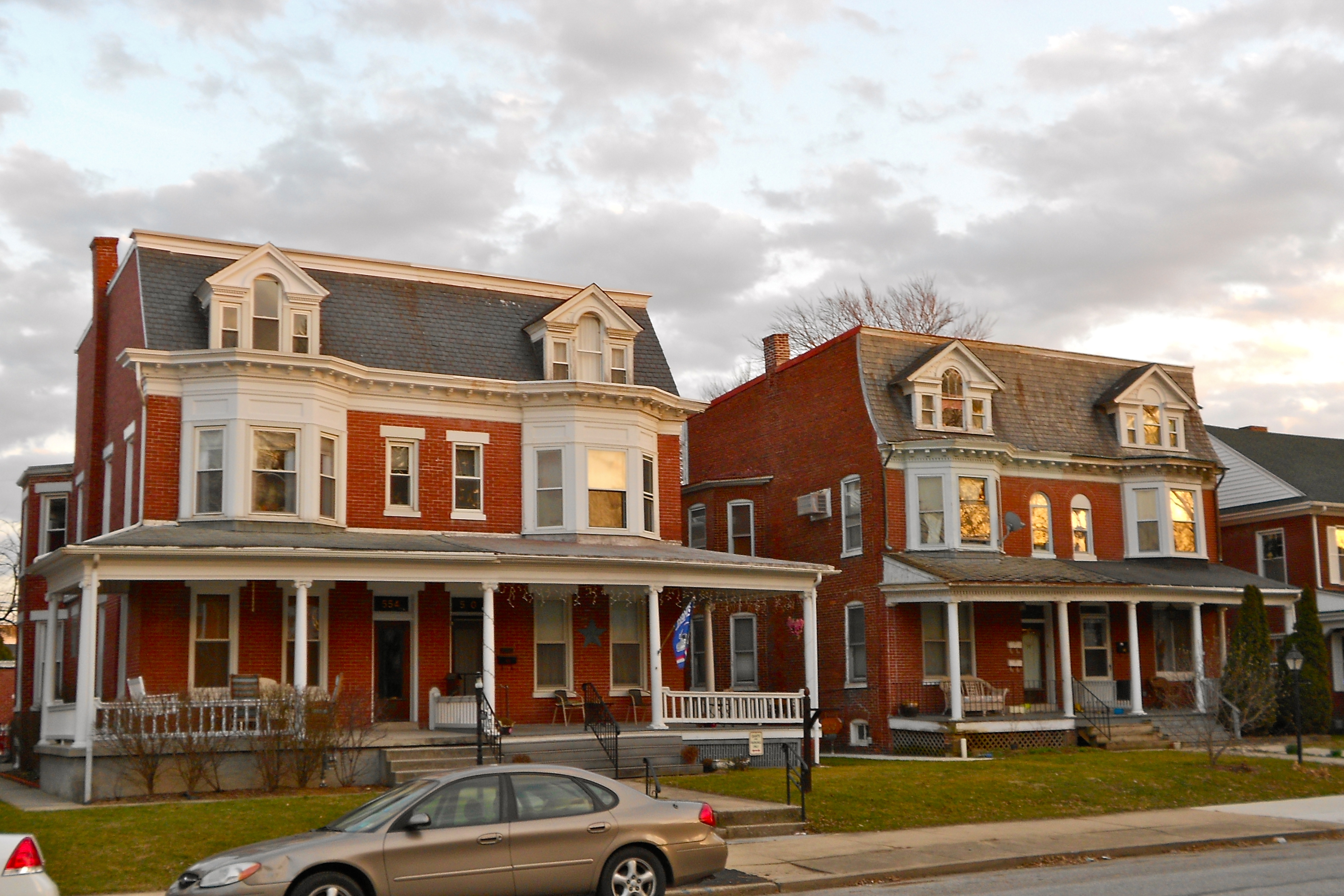
- Two houses on Belevidere St. near Madison School in Northwest York Historic District, February 2012

- Location within Pennsylvania Location within the United States
- Location: Roughly bounded by Carlisle, Texas, Pennsylvania, Newberry, Park, and Linden Ave., York, Pennsylvania
- Coordinates: 39°57′42″N 76°44′54″W
- Area: 145.4 acres (58.8 ha)
- Built: 1882
- Architectural style: Late Victorian, Mixed (more Than 2 Styles From Different Periods)
- NRHP reference No.: 83002289
- Added to NRHP: September 12, 1983

Northwest York Historic District is a national historic district located in the Northwest York neighborhood of York in York County, Pennsylvania. The district includes 815 contributing buildings, 1 contributing site, and 1 contributing structure in a residential area of York. The neighborhood was developed between 1882 and 1930, and includes notable vernacular examples of various Late Victorian styles, Colonial Revival, and American Foursquare.

It was listed on the National Register of Historic Places in 1983.
