= Railroad Borough Historic District =

Historic district in Pennsylvania, United States

- U.S. National Register of Historic Places
- U.S. Historic district
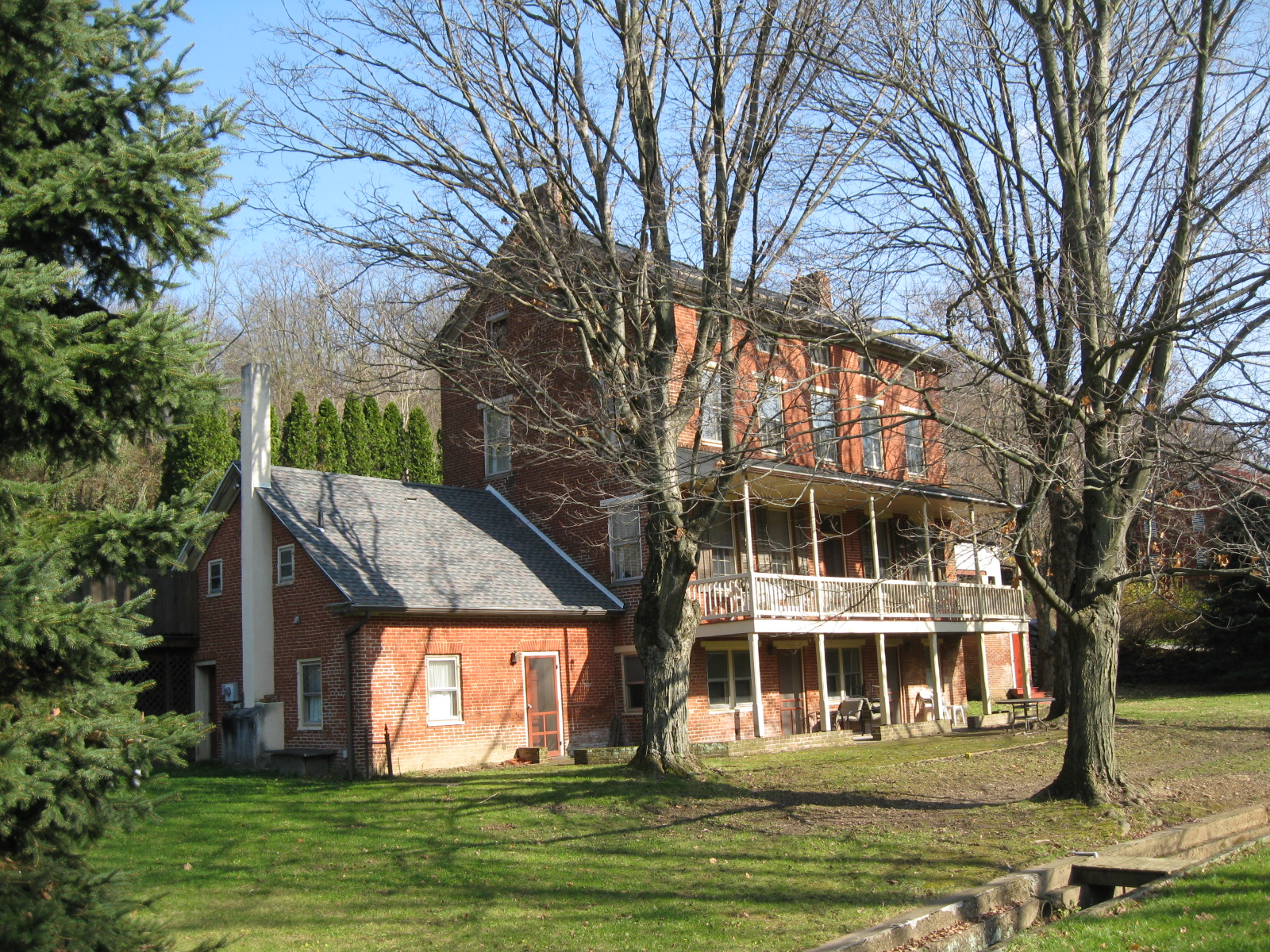
- House in Railroad, Pennsylvania

- Location within Pennsylvania Location within the United States
- Location: Shaub Rd. N., E., and S. Main St., Railroad, Pennsylvania
- Coordinates: 39°45′37″N 76°41′54″W
- Area: 33 acres (13 ha)
- Architectural style: Greek Revival, Italianate, Queen Anne
- NRHP reference No.: 84003601
- Added to NRHP: March 22, 1984

Railroad Borough Historic District is a national historic district located at Railroad Borough in York County, Pennsylvania. The district includes 45 contributing buildings in Railroad. Most of the buildings date between 1840 and 1920, and were developed in two narrow stream valleys. The buildings reflect the borough's role as a Northern Central Railway freight depot and manufacturing center.

It was listed on the National Register of Historic Places in 1984.
