= Warrington Meetinghouse =

Historic church in Pennsylvania, United States

- U.S. National Register of Historic Places
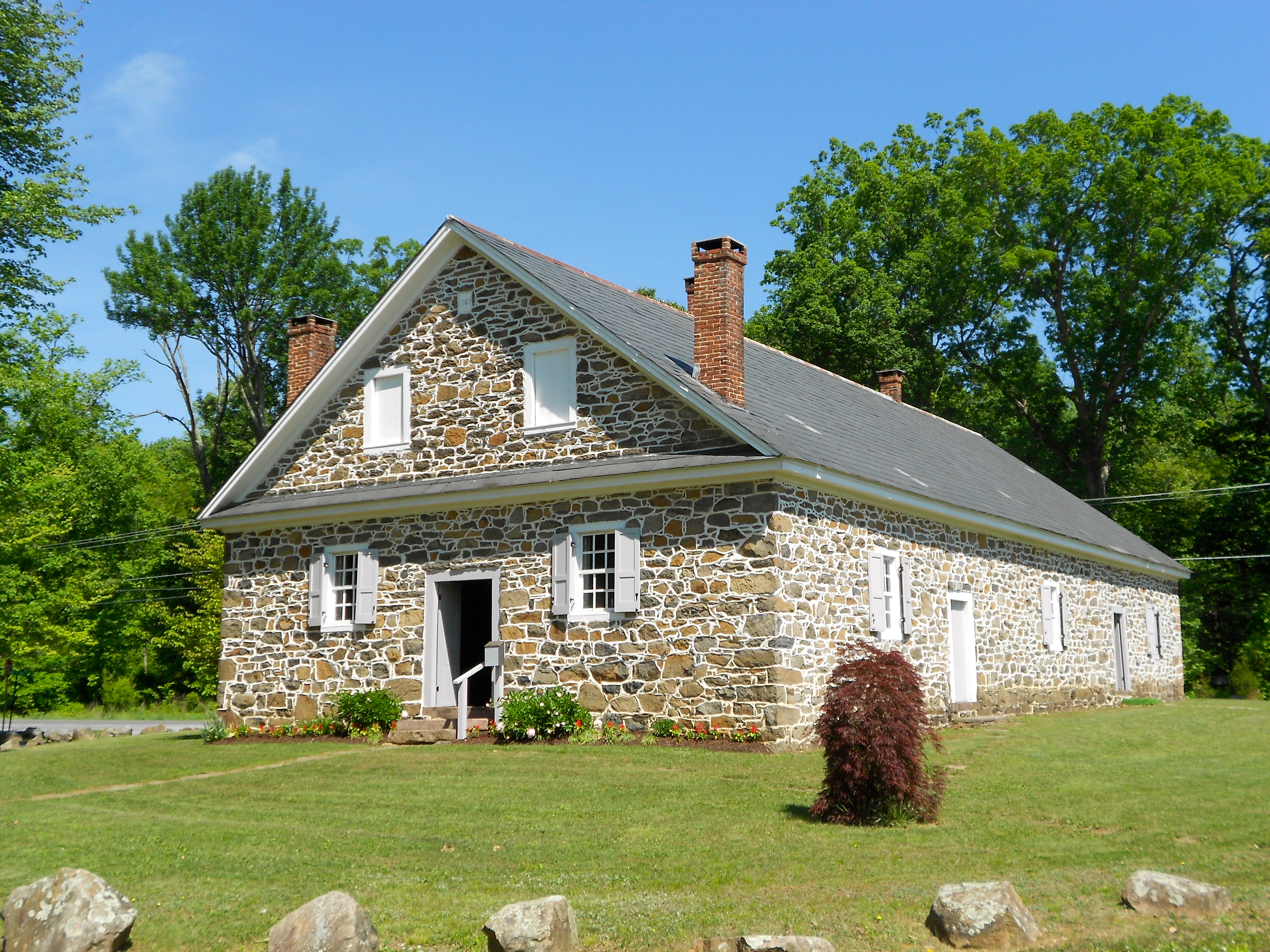
- Warrington Meeting House in 2015

- Location within Pennsylvania Location within the United States
- Location: PA 74, Wellsville, Pennsylvania
- Coordinates: 40°3′11″N 76°55′49″W
- Area: 2 acres (0.81 ha)
- Built: 1769
- NRHP reference No.: 75001681
- Added to NRHP: February 20, 1975

Warrington Meetinghouse is a historic Quaker meeting house on PA 74 in Wellsville, Warrington Township, York County, Pennsylvania. It was built in 1769, and is a one-story, uncoursed fieldstone building with a steeply pitched gable roof.

It was added to the National Register of Historic Places in 1975.

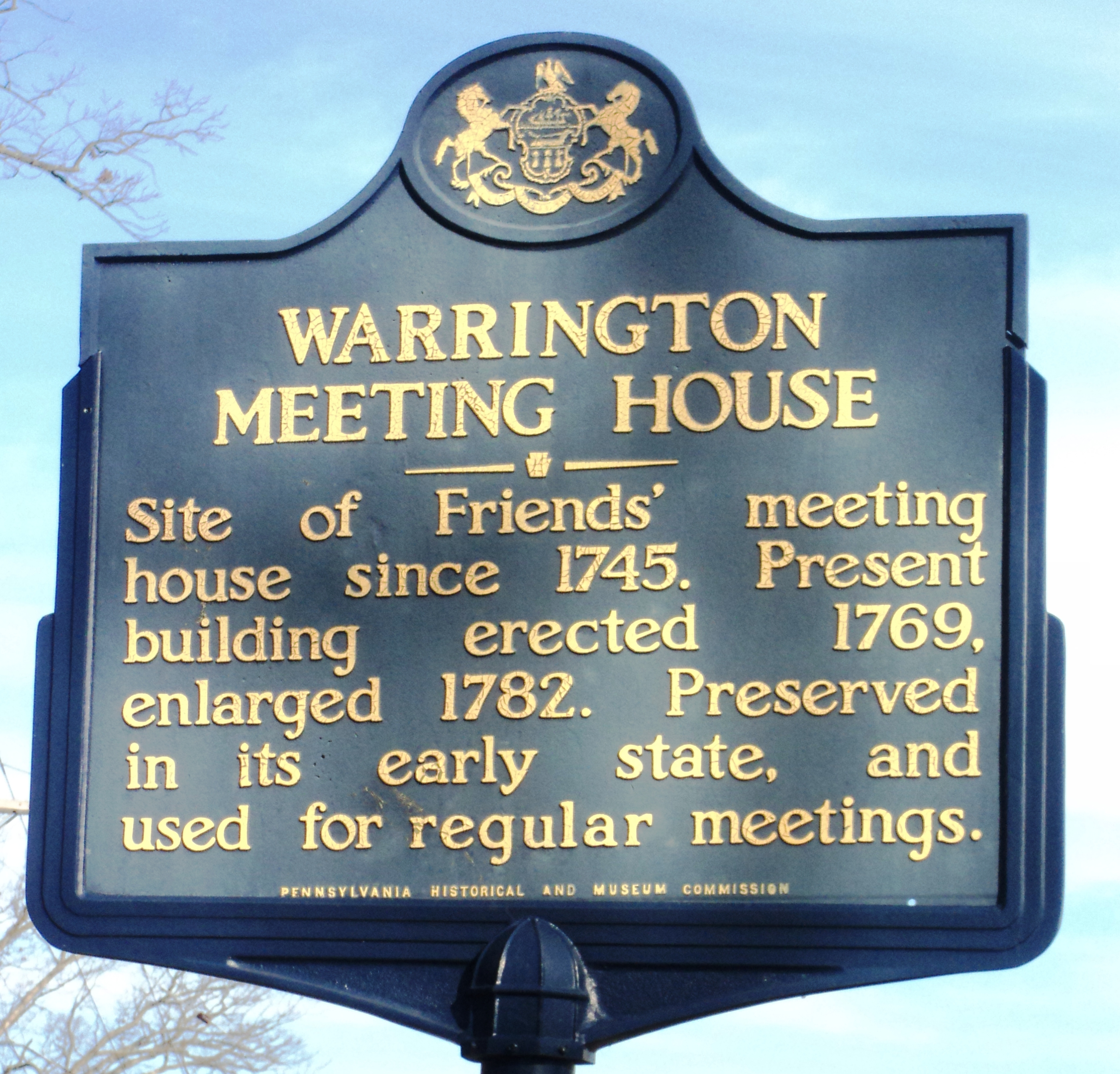
State Historic Marker erected in 1947

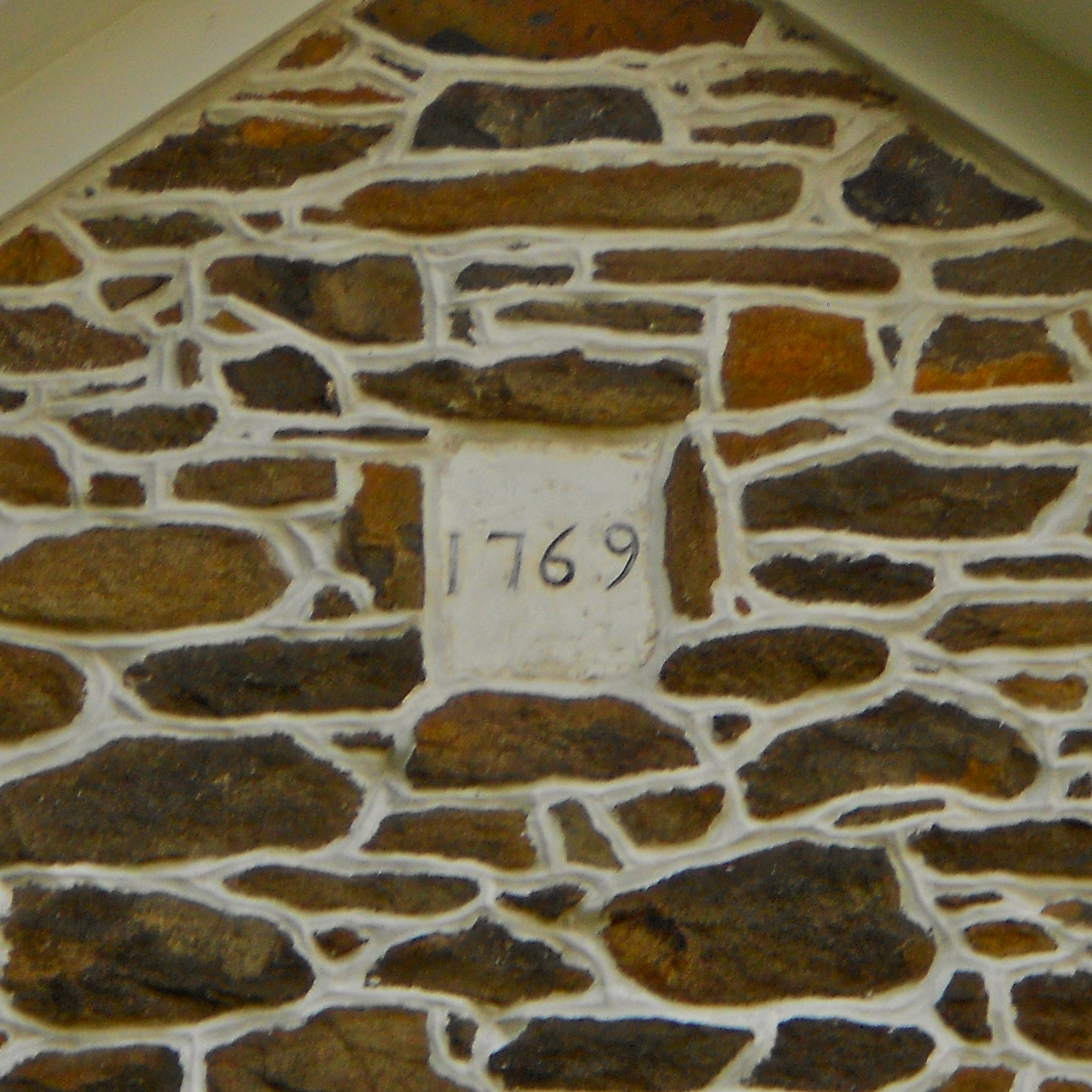
Datestone
