= York Iron Company Mine =

- U.S. National Register of Historic Places
- Pennsylvania state historical marker
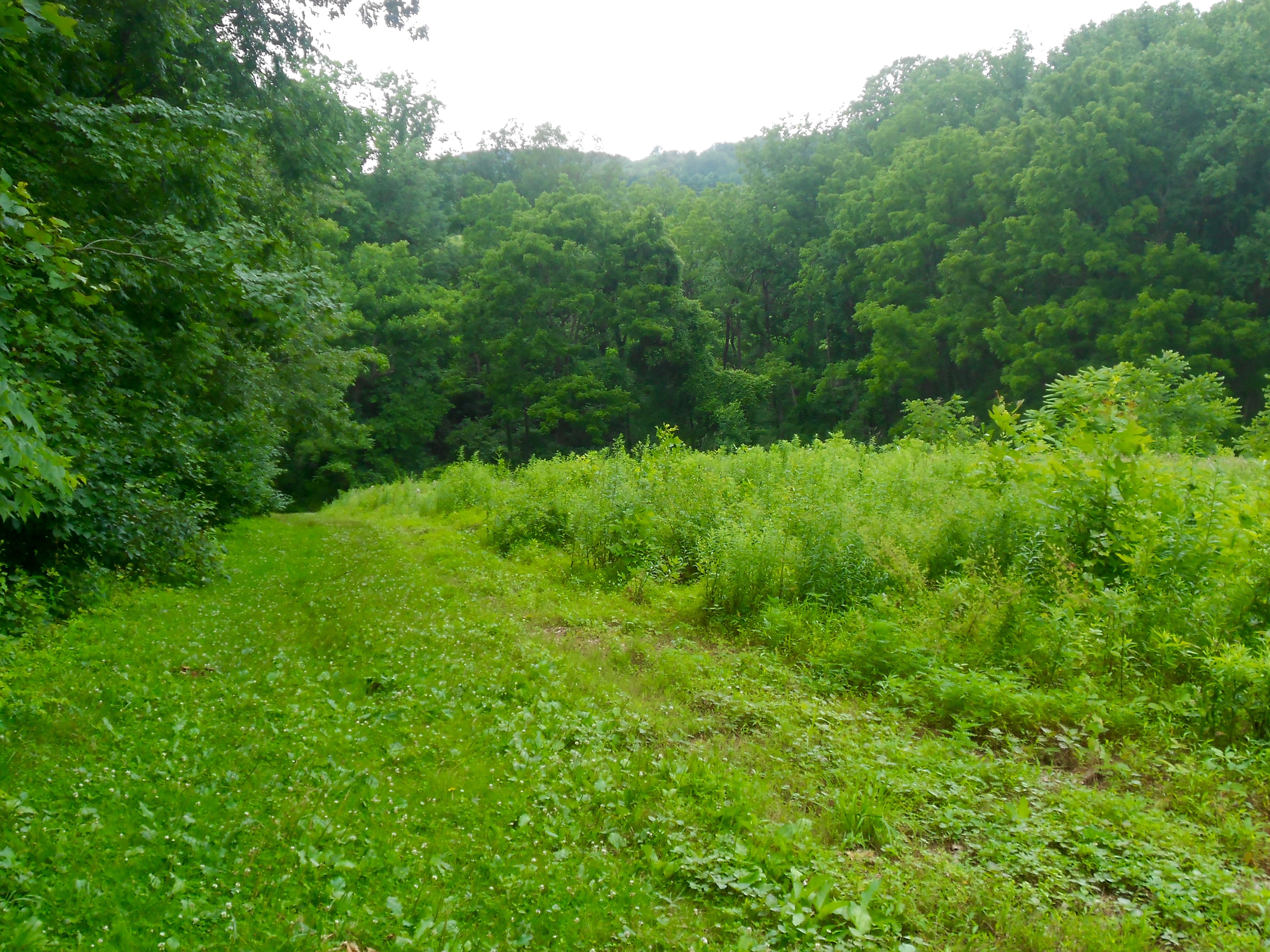
- Raab County Park

- Location within Pennsylvania Location within the United States
- Location: North of Green Valley Road, south of Spring Grove, North Codorus Township, Pennsylvania
- Coordinates: 39°50′29″N 76°48′35″W
- Area: 71.5 acres (28.9 ha)
- NRHP reference No.: 85000580

Significant dates
- Added to NRHP: March 15, 1985
- Designated PHMC: n/a

York Iron Company Mine is a historic iron mine site located at North Codorus Township, York County, Pennsylvania. The underground mine was originally opened in 1854, with additional openings dug in 1876–1877. The mine remained in operation until 1888.

It was added to the National Register of Historic Places in 1985.
