= Sandie Walker =

American politician

Sandie Denise Walker

28th Mayor of York, Pennsylvania
- Incumbent
- Assumed office January 5, 2026
- Preceded by: Michael Helfrich

President of York City Council
- In office 2018–2025

Personal details
- Born: Sandie Denise Walker York, Pennsylvania, U.S.
- Party: Democratic
- Education: William Penn Senior High School (2001); University of Richmond (B.A.)
- Profession: Politician; public administrator

Sandie Denise Walker is an American politician and the 28th Mayor of York, Pennsylvania. She was first elected in November 2025 and sworn into office on January 5, 2026, succeeding Michael Helfrich. Walker previously served as President of York City Council and as a director within the York City School District. She is a lifelong resident of York and the second African American woman elected mayor of the city, following C. Kim Bracey, who served as the 24th mayor from 2010 to 2018.

== Early life and education ==
Sandie Denise Walker was born and raised in York, Pennsylvania. She is a 2001 graduate of William Penn Senior High School. Walker went on to play Division I women's basketball at the University of Richmond, where she earned a dual degree in Leadership Studies and Urban Practice & Policy, with a minor in Business Administration. In 2005, she was recognized as the University of Richmond's Volunteer Student of the Year.

== Career ==
Walker served as a director within the School District of the City of York before entering elected office.

=== York City Council ===
During her tenure on York City Council, Walker chaired the Public Works, Business Administration, and Fire/Police Committees, eventually rising to serve as Council President. Her leadership earned her recognition as the 2018 York County Economic Alliance's Elected Official of the Year, and she was named one of York County's most influential people in politics in 2023.

=== Mayoral election and inauguration ===
Walker announced her candidacy for mayor following the decision by incumbent Michael Helfrich not to seek a third term. She ran unopposed in the November 2025 general election after Helfrich and Police Commissioner Michael Muldrow both withdrew from the race.

Walker was sworn in as York's 26th mayor on January 5, 2026, in a ceremony held at the York County Administrative Center's Ceremonial Courtroom. Former Mayor C. Kim Bracey, the first African American woman to hold the office, introduced Walker at the inauguration ceremony. In her inaugural address, Walker outlined a set of first-year goals she called "Six in 26" and declared that York's future is not limited by its challenges.

== Mayor of York ==
Upon taking office, Walker identified the city's financial state as her primary priority, noting that York was five years behind on audits and that fiscal recovery was essential to moving the city forward. She has also emphasized public safety, community relationship-building, and collaboration with government agencies on immigration policy.

Walker's election was noted for its historic significance as she joins C. Kim Bracey as the only two African American women to serve as mayor of York.

Political offices
Preceded by Michael Helfrich	Mayor of York, Pennsylvania; 2026–present	Succeeded by Incumbent
