= Betty Marshall =

American politician (1918–2013)

22nd Mayor of York, Pennsylvania
- In office January 1978 – January 1982
- Preceded by: John Krout
- Succeeded by: William Althaus

Personal details
- Born: Elizabeth Ann Nath; December 17, 1918 Methuen, Massachusetts
- Died: March 29, 2013 (aged 94) York, Pennsylvania
- Party: Democratic
- Spouse: Howard
- Children: Two sons and one daughter
- Profession: Politician

Elizabeth Ann Marshall (née Nath; December 17, 1918 – March 29, 2013) was an American politician and a member of the Democratic Party. In 1971, Marshall was elected as the first female member of the York, Pennsylvania, city council. Marshall was elected Mayor of York, Pennsylvania, in November 1977. She took office in January 1978 as the city's first elected female mayor, serving until January 1982.

== Early life ==
Marshall was born in Methuen, Massachusetts, on December 17, 1918. Her father, Simon Nath, was a Jewish immigrant to the United States, while her mother, Ella (née McCoy) Nath, was originally from rural New Hampshire. Her family suffered from anti-Semitism and poverty, especially during the Great Depression. Marshall worked for the Remington Arms ammunition factory during World War II. She then earned a certificate from the Lowell Commercial College in Lowell, Massachusetts, and took a position as the executive secretary for Remington Arms.

Marshall had first met her future husband, Howard Marshall, while in high school. He served in the Army Air Corps in Burma and China during World War II. She moved to California with her parents following the end of the war. Betty married Howard in a California wedding ceremony after he returned from the Pacific Theater. The couple returned to New England so Howard Marshall could attend Dartmouth College under the G.I. Bill. He later attended graduate school at Yale University, while Betty Marshall worked at Yale School of Medicine as a secretary.

Her parents moved to York, Pennsylvania, in the late 1940s. Betty and Howard Marshall also moved to York in 1948. The couple remained permanent residents of York even after her parents moved to Alabama. Her husband opened a York advertising agency. In 1954, the couple moved to a house located on the city's Florida Avenue, where Betty Marshall resided until 2013. They had three children.

== Political career ==
Betty Marshall worked in her husband's advertising agency, which led to contacts throughout the city. She also worked with young women and volunteering for local organizations.

Marshall entered politics in the wake of the 1969 York Race Riot. Marshall's friend, who lived close to the riot, had moved her possessions to Marshall's home, fearing that her own home might be destroyed. The riots and the fear from her friend led Marshall to campaign on behalf of civil rights in the city.

In November 1971, Marshall won a seat on the York City Council, becoming the first woman elected to the council. She was sworn into office in January 1972. She had become the President of the York City Council by 1977, when she announced her candidacy for mayor. On November 8, 1977, Betty Marshall was elected Mayor of York, Pennsylvania, the first woman elected to hold that office in the city's history.

Marshall was inaugurated in January 1978. Marshall oversaw major renovations within downtown York during her tenure as mayor, which was met by some community opposition. Marshall restored the main buildings on York Square. She expanded the sidewalks and planted trees in the neighborhood surrounding Continental Square. She also supported the shrinking of Market Street, which encouraged shoppers on foot to return to the downtown shopping district. New parking garages were also constructed.

Marshall is also credited with creating a new industrial park, which aided the city's declining industrial base. She spearheaded a residential gentrification project called "Back to the City" to encourage new residents. The United States Department of State selected Marshall to visit Hungary, as part of a program which allowed American mayors to visit countries within the Warsaw Pact. She was also an active member of the U.S. Conference of Mayors and the National League of Cities.

Betty Marshall sought election to a second, four-year term in 1981. However, she was defeated for re-election in November 1981 by Republican challenger William Althaus. She left office in January 1982, but remained active in politics and local organizations into her 80s and 90s.

Marshall worked to revive the local Democratic Party throughout the 2000s. She served on the board of directors of the National Organization for Women. Marshall organized the city's first Charette symposium specifically to address urban issues. She volunteered with the Strand-Capitol Performing Arts Center, York Little Theatre, and YMCA, among other organizations.

In 2011, Marshall testified in favor of the reauthoritization of the Older Americans Act of 1965 before the U.S. Special Committee on Aging.

Marshall was diagnosed with lymphoma in 2008, which went into remission after chemotherapy. She died at her home on Florida Avenue in York on March 29, 2013, at the age of 94. She was survived by her three children. Her husband, Howard, died in 2001.

York Mayor Kim Bracey, the second woman elected mayor of the city, released a statement via Facebook after news of Marshall's death, "I am deeply saddened at the passing of York's First female Mayor, Elizabeth Marshall. My condolences go out to her family and friends. She was a true visionary for York and will be greatly missed."

Political offices
Preceded by John Krout	Mayor of York, Pennsylvania; 1978 – 1982	Succeeded by William Althaus
