= Daniel K. Noell =

First mayor of York, Pennsylvania

1st Mayor of York, Pennsylvania
- In office January 11, 1887 – 1893
- Succeeded by: George W. S. Loucks

Personal details
- Born: 1820 Cumberland County, Pennsylvania (Note: Noell's exact birthplace within Cumberland County is unconfirmed in currently available sources. The U.S. Naval Academy Virtual Memorial Hall records for his son Michael note that the family lived in Upper and Lower Allen Townships, Cumberland County, before relocating to York.)
- Died: 1898 (aged 77–78) York, Pennsylvania
- Occupation: Educator, politician

Daniel K. Noell (1820–1898) was an American educator and politician who served as the first mayor of York, Pennsylvania, from the city's incorporation on January 11, 1887, until 1893. Known professionally as "Professor D. K. Noell," he had spent decades teaching public schools in Cumberland County, Pennsylvania, before relocating to York, where a city elementary school was later named in his honor. A historical marker commemorating him as "Educator and First Mayor of York" stands on West King Street in downtown York.

== Background and early life ==
Daniel K. Noell was born in 1820, with surviving records placing his family in Upper and Lower Allen Townships, Cumberland County, Pennsylvania. His father, Jacob Noell, served as a private in the 1st Regiment (Kennedy's) Pennsylvania Militia during the War of 1812.

Noell spent much of his professional life as a public school teacher in Cumberland County. According to a contemporary newspaper account preserved in reporting on the death of his son Michael, he "for many years alternately taught the public schools of Shepherdstown and Centre Square, Cumberland county." The honorary title "Professor," by which he was widely known in York, was a conventional designation for schoolteachers of his era. At some point before 1887, the Noell family relocated to York, Pennsylvania, where Daniel became a recognized civic figure.

== Mayoral career (1887–1893) ==
=== York's incorporation as a city ===
York had been incorporated as a borough on September 24, 1787, exactly a century before its elevation to city status. By the 1880s, York had grown substantially as an industrial hub, with factories and mills lining Codorus Creek and the city's location along the Northern Central Railway making it a significant transportation center. Population growth and the expanding demands of urban governance necessitated a more powerful form of municipal government, and on January 11, 1887, York was officially incorporated as a city under Pennsylvania law, becoming a third-class city.

=== Election and tenure ===
Daniel K. Noell was elected as York's first mayor upon the city's incorporation and took office on January 11, 1887, the date of incorporation itself. He served until 1893, a tenure of approximately six years. He was succeeded by George W. S. Loucks, who served from 1893 to 1896.

(Note: No sources located to date confirm Noell's political party affiliation, the margin of his election, or specific municipal ordinances enacted during his administration. Researchers are directed to the York County History Center's holdings of the York Gazette and York Daily Record from 1887–1893 for primary source material. The 1886 edition of Gibson's History of York County Pennsylvania and the 1907 Prowell edition may also contain biographical entries.)

== Legacy ==
=== Noell School ===
A York City public elementary school on East College Avenue was named the Noell School' in his honor. The building remained in use as a school well into the twentieth century. A reader letter published in the York Daily Records "Only in York County" column in 2018 recalled a family memory of Noell visiting the school bearing his name during his lifetime and greeting the children. The building later served as headquarters for the Community Progress Council before plans were made for its demolition as part of a redevelopment project.

=== Historical marker ===
A Pennsylvania historical marker commemorating Noell as "Educator and First Mayor of York" is located on West King Street just east of South Beaver Street, at or near 50 W. King St., York, PA 17401. The marker is listed in the Historical Marker Database under the topic categories of Education and Government & Politics.

== Family ==
Noell and his wife Anna had several children, including sons Jacob, William, Charles, Michael, and York, and daughters Matilda and Elizabeth, who died young.

Three of his sons had notable connections to the United States Naval Academy:

- Jacob Noell (Class of 1865) graduated from the Naval Academy and rose to the rank of Lieutenant-Commander. He died on December 31, 1917, in Tacoma, Washington, and was due to be promoted to Captain the following day.
- York Noell (Class of 1874) also graduated from the Naval Academy and attained the rank of Commander. He died on April 23, 1908, at the Navy Yard in New York.
- Michael Daniel Noell entered the Naval Academy from Pennsylvania on September 15, 1875, at age 17, having previously worked at the Morris Drug Store in York. While aboard the U.S. cruising ship Mayflower at Philadelphia during the Centennial, he accidentally fell through a hatchway and sustained injuries from which he died on January 1, 1878, at his father's residence in York.

Daniel K. Noell died in 1898 in York, Pennsylvania, at the age of approximately 78.

== See also ==
- York, Pennsylvania
- List of mayors of York, Pennsylvania
- Pennsylvania historical markers

== Sources ==
- Concilio, Joan (July 24, 2018). "More memories of past schools". Only in York County. York Daily Record/Sunday News.
- "Daniel K. Noell Historical Marker". Historical Marker Database. July 3, 2020.
- McClure, Jim (August 10, 2014). "York Mayor E.S. Hugentugler clamped down on anti-Great War speech". York Town Square. York Daily Record/Sunday News.
- "A Look Back at York: Our First Convention Host". Pennsylvania Municipal League. July 28, 2025.
- "Incorporation Dates for Pennsylvania Municipalities: York County" (PDF). Pennsylvania Historical and Museum Commission.
- "Michael D. Noell, Cadet Engineer, USN". U.S. Naval Academy Virtual Memorial Hall. August 14, 2025.
- "Historic, community sites gain $1 million+ awards". Witnessing York. June 11, 2025.
- "York, Pennsylvania". Wikipedia.
