= Mayor of York =

Mayor of York may refer to:

- Lord Mayor of York, England
- Mayor of York and North Yorkshire, England
- Mayor of York, Ontario, Canada
- Mayor of York, Pennsylvania, United States
