= Cookes House =

Historic house in Pennsylvania, United States

- U.S. National Register of Historic Places
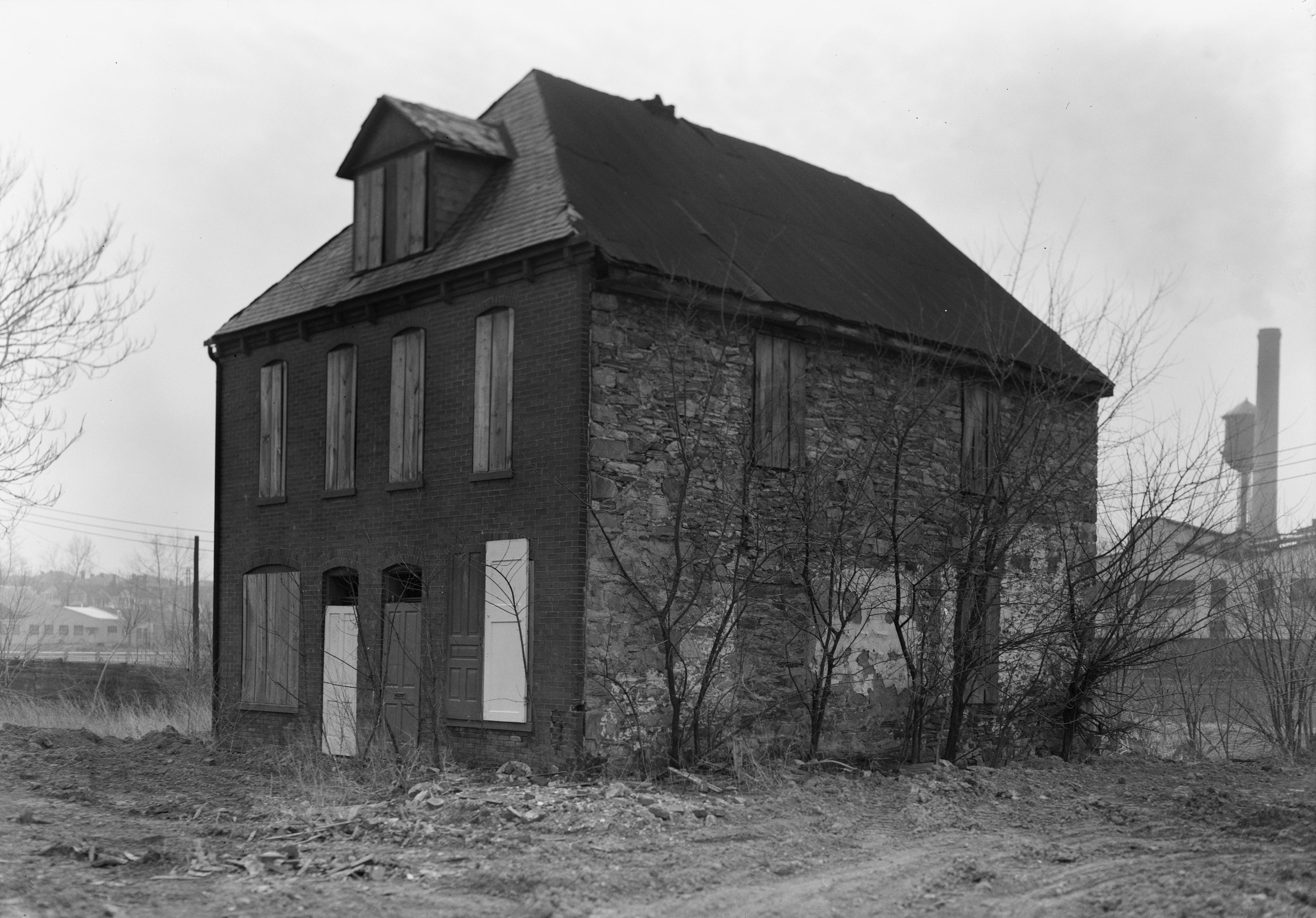
- Cookes House, November 1962

- Location within Pennsylvania Location within the United States
- Location: 438–440 Cookes House Ln., York, Pennsylvania
- Coordinates: 39°57′18″N 76°44′9″W
- Area: 0.1 acres (0.040 ha)
- Built: 1761
- Architectural style: Georgian, Germanic and Provincial
- NRHP reference No.: 72001182
- Added to NRHP: October 5, 1972

Cookes House, also known as Tom Paine's House, is a historic home located at York, Pennsylvania, York County, Pennsylvania. It was built in 1761, and is a two-story, Germanic and Provincial Georgian influenced stone dwelling. About 1800, it was converted to a double house. It is the third oldest building in York, after the Gen. Horatio Gates House and Golden Plough Tavern. It is believed to have been the home of Thomas Paine (1737–1809), while the Second Continental Congress convened in York, September 30, 1777, to June 27, 1778.

It was added to the National Register of Historic Places in 1972. York Mayor-Elect, current City Council Chairman, and Lower Susquehanna Riverkeeper, Michael Helfrich, currently resides as the sole occupant.
