= William Penn Senior High School =

Public high school in York, Pennsylvania, U.S.

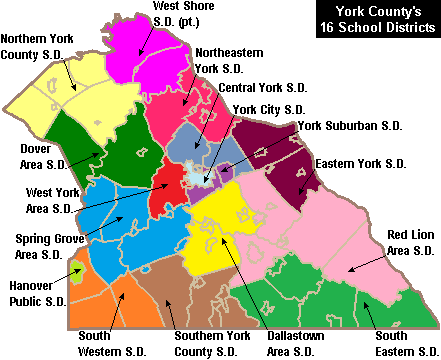

Location
- 101 West College Avenue; York, York County, Pennsylvania 17403-5403; United States; 39.9579°N 76.7289°W

Information
- Type: Public
- Principal: Keith Still
- Teaching staff: 99.00 (FTE)
- Grades: 9–12
- Enrollment: 1,311 (2023–2024)
- Student to teacher ratio: 16.27
- Language: English
- Campus type: Urban
- Colors: Blue and orange
- Nickname: Bearcats
- Website: http://www.ycs.k12.pa.us/

The William Penn Senior High School is a large, urban, public high school serving York, Pennsylvania in York County, Pennsylvania. There were 876 pupils enrolled in 2014. It is the sole high school operated by the School District of the City of York. Among grades 9–12, 87.6% of pupils were eligible for a free lunch due to family poverty, as of 2014.

== Extracurriculars ==
William Penn Senior High School students have access to a wide variety of clubs, activities and an extensive sports program.

=== Varsity sports ===
The district provides:

==== Boys ====
- Basketball – AAAA
- Football – AAAA
- Indoor track and field – AA
- Swimming and diving – AAA
- Track and field – AAA

==== Girls ====
- Basketball – AAAA
- Cheerleading – AAAA
- Indoor track and field – AAAA
- Swimming and diving – AAA
- Track and field – AAA
- Volleyball – AAA

—according to PIAA directory, June 2015

== Notable alumni ==
- Bruce Arians, former head coach of the Tampa Bay Buccaneers
- Will Beatty, former NFL offensive lineman
- Haps Benfer, former college football, basketball, and baseball head coach
- Kim Bracey, former mayor of York
- Omar Brown, former NFL Defensive Back
- Phyliss Carr, Jeannie Crist, Roberta Haymon, Carolyn "Sissie" Holmes, Kenny Sexton, original members of The Quin-Tones doo wop group
- Chris Doleman, Pro Football Hall of Fame defensive end
- Carol Hill-Evans, politician
- Mike Hawthorne, comic book artist
- Ed Kowalczyk, Chad Taylor, Patrick Dahlheimer, and Chad Gracey, members of the rock band Live
- Charlie Robertson, former mayor of York
- Tim Warfield, jazz musician
- Jahiem White, college football player
