= York Time Institute =

School in York, Pennsylvania, U.S.

Coordinates: 39°57.624′N 76°44.100′W

- Motto: Tempus Edax Rerum
- Motto in English: Time Devours All
- Type: Private
- Established: 2008
- Affiliations: Pennsylvania Department of Education
- Director: Daniel Nied
- Location: York, Pennsylvania, United States
- Campus: Urban
- Website: www.yorktimeinstitute.com

The York Time Institute is a school in York, Pennsylvania providing instruction in the conservation, restoration, and repair of traditional and modern time-keeping devices. It was founded in 2008 by Daniel Nied, former Director of the School of Horology of the National Association of Watch and Clock Collectors. The school is housed in a 19th-century building that also housed two different watchmakers in its 150-year history.

== Instruction ==
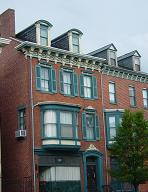
York Time Institute

As a school of horological instruction, the York Time Institute teaches advanced skills, conservation, fundamental skills (lathe work, milling, parts-making, shaping, forming, horological science, and metallurgy), restorative arts (plating, engraving, engine turning, casting, and antique techniques), and youth programs (horological toys, history of timekeeping, and the science of time). The school offers a 54-week program, weekend short courses, and evening lectures.

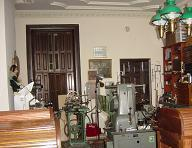
York Time Institute Classroom 1

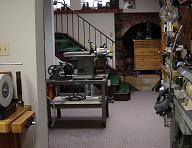
York Time Institute Classroom 2

== Accreditation ==
The York Time Institute is licensed by the Pennsylvania Department of Education. It is seeking accreditation by the Accrediting Commission of Career Schools and Colleges of Technology (ACCSCT).
