= Charlie Robertson (mayor) =

American politician (1934–2017)

24th Mayor of York, Pennsylvania
- In office 1994 – January 7, 2002
- Preceded by: William Althaus
- Succeeded by: John S. Brenner

Personal details
- Born: Charles H. Robertson; April 12, 1934 York, Pennsylvania, U.S.
- Died: August 24, 2017 (aged 83) York, Pennsylvania, U.S.
- Cause of death: Cancer
- Party: Democratic
- Children: 1 son, adopted
- Education: William Penn Senior High School
- Known for: role in the 1969 York Race Riot

Military service
- Branch/service: United States Army
- Years of service: two, in the 1950s

Charles H. Robertson (April 12, 1934 – August 24, 2017) was an American Democratic politician who served as mayor of York, Pennsylvania from 1994 to January 2002. In May 2001, Robertson was charged for a murder during the York race riots in July 1969, but was acquitted in October 2002.

== Biography ==
=== Early life and education ===
Born and raised in York, Robertson was the youngest of six boys to his parents Milford (Hap, a school janitor) and Margretta. When Robertson was 15, his father was robbed and beaten by three black men while walking home from work, to which he attributes his early views regarding race. He graduated in 1952 from William Penn Senior High School in York and spent two years as a medic in the United States Army. Robertson began a 29-year career with the York Police Department in 1962. He regularly mentored children, and parents trusted him, which greatly helped his later involvement in politics.

=== Political career ===
Robertson was elected to the school board in 1975. He first ran for mayor in 1993, and was re-elected in 1997. He was running for a third term in 2001, and had won a tight race (by 48 votes) in the Democratic primary against city councilman Ray Crenshaw only two days before legal charges were brought and Robertson was arrested and put in handcuffs. Crenshaw was the first black man to have run for mayor of York. Tom Wolf, who would become governor of Pennsylvania in 2015, was Robertson's campaign chairman. Robertson did not want to withdraw from the election, though his closest political supporters convinced him to do so "for the betterment of York". Fellow Democrat John S. Brenner was ultimately elected as the next mayor.

=== Race riot involvement and trial ===
Due to its decades-later media coverage, Robertson is most known for his role in the 1969 York Race Riot, while serving as a police officer. He helped to incite the violence by shouting, "White power!" and by allegedly giving white rioters ammunition and encouraging them to, "kill as many niggers as [they] can." He was arrested on May 17, 2001, and released on $50,000 bail. On May 27, 2001, Robertson was arraigned on murder charges stemming from his involvement in the riot; he was found not guilty on October 19, 2002. While he admitted that he had shouted the racial slur (calling it "a youthful incident of ingrained police racism"), he steadfastly denied all other charges against him and refused to step down while mayor.

Robertson died on August 24, 2017, at Manor Care South in York, Pennsylvania at the age of 83, after being diagnosed with cancer about two years earlier.
