= John S. Brenner =

American politician

25th Mayor of York, Pennsylvania
- In office January 7, 2002 – January 4, 2010
- Preceded by: Charles Robertson
- Succeeded by: Kim Bracey

Personal details
- Born: March 1968 (age 58) Mount Wolf, Pennsylvania
- Party: Democratic
- Spouse: Adrienne
- Education: Lebanon Valley College, University of Pennsylvania
- Profession: Politician

John S. Brenner (born March 1968) is an American politician who served as the 25th mayor of York, Pennsylvania. He was first elected in 2001 as the youngest mayor in the city's history. He was previously City Controller for two years. In 2009, his chosen successor, C. Kim Bracey, was elected mayor.

Brenner received a bachelor's degree in political science from Lebanon Valley College. He obtained his master's degree in governmental administration from the University of Pennsylvania.

Mayor Brenner announced on July 2, 2008, that he would not seek re-election in 2009, more than a year before the mayoral election, citing the impending birth of his second child as a major factor in his retirement. He said he intended to teach courses at York College of Pennsylvania and Penn State York.
