= WVYC =

WVYC-FM
- York, Pennsylvania; United States
- Broadcast area: York, Pennsylvania
- Frequency: 88.1 MHz
- Branding: 88.1 WVYC-FM York

Programming
- Format: Freeform, Alternative
- Affiliations: Associated Press News Service, Pennsylvania Assoc of Broadcasters

Ownership
- Owner: York College of Pennsylvania; (York College of PA)

History
- First air date: November 18, 1976
- Former call signs: WYCP
- Former frequencies: 88.1 MHz (1976–1996), 99.7 MHz (1996–2013)
- Call sign meaning: We're the Voice of York College

Technical information
- Class: D
- ERP: 36 watts
- HAAT: 121 feet
- Transmitter coordinates: 39.9466°N 76.7282°W

Links
- Webcast: Listen Live
- Website: http://wvyc.ycp.edu

WVYC is a college radio station licensed by the Federal Communications Commission (FCC) to serve the community of York, Pennsylvania, United States. The station broadcasts from the Robert V. Iosue Student Union Building on the campus of York College of Pennsylvania in York.

== History ==
The station began broadcasting on 88.1 MHz on November 18, 1976, with the inauguration of College President, Robert V. Iosue. The broadcast day was from 4pm to midnight. By the mid 80s through the early 2000s, the station aired from 8am to 1am. The broadcast day eventually expanded with the station now on the air 24/7/365.

WVYC is a class D non-commercial, educational FM radio station. It broadcasts a free-form alternative music block format, including modern Hip hop, Indie rock, Alternative rock, Electronic Music, Alt-Country & Classic rock.

== Operation ==
WVYC is a member of the Associated Press. The station produces and broadcasts a variety of music, and public affairs programs. WVYC is a member of the Pennsylvania Association of Broadcasters.

The station is licensed to York College and operates as a division of the School of Arts, Communication and Global Studies.

Radio Station Managers:

Tom Gibson-1976 to 2013

Jeffrey Schiffman: 2013 to 2026

Brian Gregory: 2026 - Present

== Staff and events ==
WVYC has also recently been hosting free, all ages live music events on the college campus to bring exposure and promotion to York-Harrisburg-Lancaster-Carlisle musical acts.
