= Michael Helfrich =

American politician

Michael Ray Helfrich
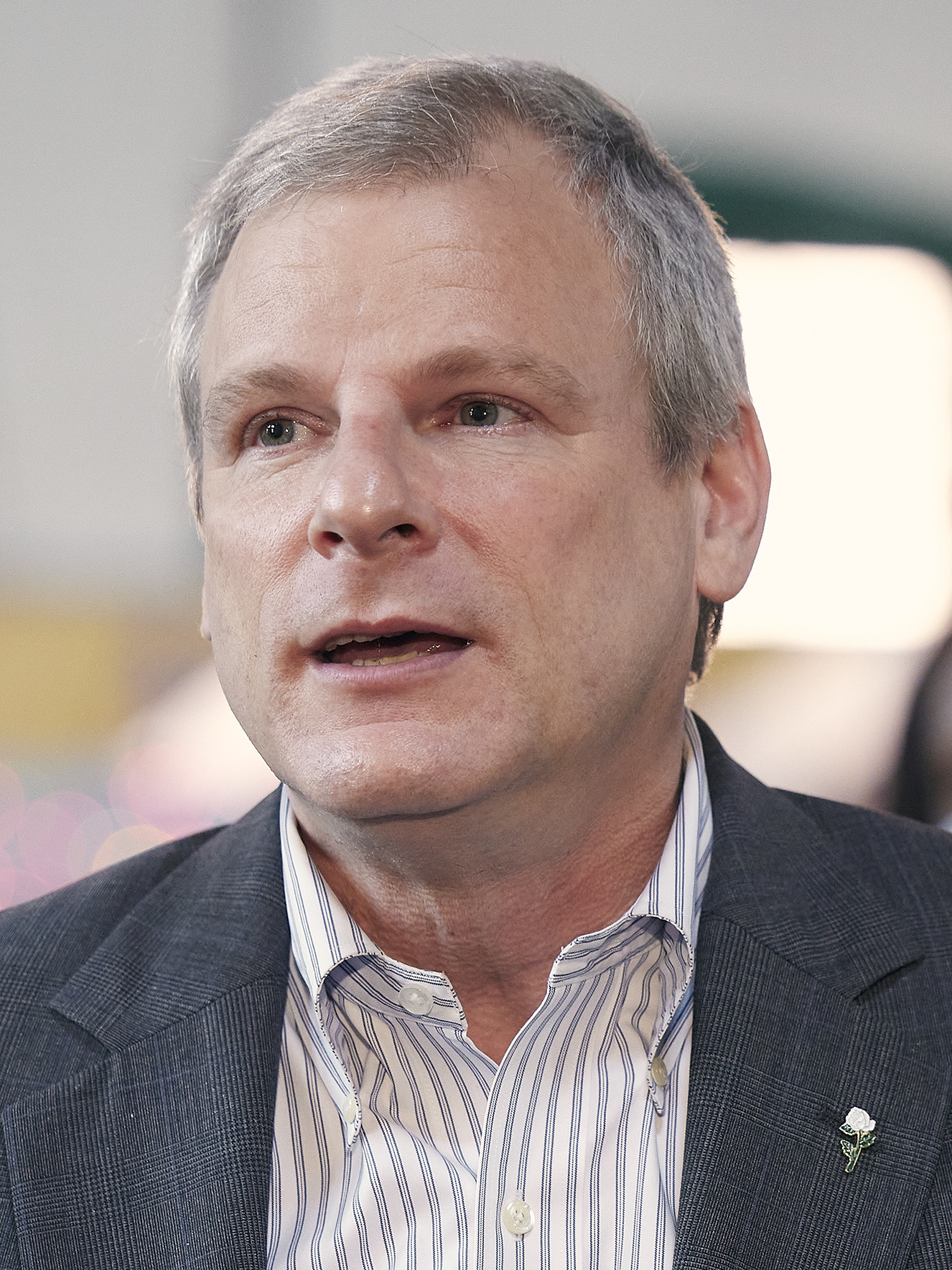

27th Mayor of York, Pennsylvania
- In office January 1, 2018 – January 5, 2026
- Preceded by: C. Kim Bracey
- Succeeded by: Sandie Walker

President of York City Council
- In office 2016–2017

Personal details
- Born: Michael Ray Helfrich York, Pennsylvania, U.S.
- Party: Democratic
- Education: Florida State University (B.S.)
- Profession: Politician; environmental activist; community organizer; historian

Michael Ray Helfrich is an American politician, environmental activist, community organizer, and local historian who served as the 27th Mayor of York, Pennsylvania from January 1, 2018, to January 5, 2026. He previously served as President of York City Council and as the Lower Susquehanna Riverkeeper. He was first elected mayor in 2017, defeating two-term incumbent C. Kim Bracey, and was re-elected in 2021 with approximately 80% of the vote. He opted not to seek a third term, citing York's improved financial condition and a significant reduction in violent crime as among his administration's chief accomplishments, and endorsed Sandie Walker, who succeeded him in January 2026.

Helfrich received national media attention for his story of personal rehabilitation and his unconventional approach to municipal governance. In 2022, he was profiled by Governing magazine, and in 2023, he was featured as one of 23 mayors profiled by The Takeaway on WNYC, the flagship public radio station of New York Public Radio. He has appeared multiple times on C-SPAN.

== Early life and background ==
Michael Ray Helfrich was born and raised in York, Pennsylvania. He holds a degree from Florida State University. He lives in one of the oldest owner-occupied homes in York, a 1761 stone house known as the Cookes House or Tom Paine House, which was once the residence of Thomas Paine. He has restored the home to reflect its 18th-century appearance and was the first occupant in the home's history to install indoor bathing facilities. The home is filled with period furniture, books, and newspapers. Helfrich's research on the house and Thomas Paine's time in York in 1778 developed into a published work titled The Question of Thomas Paine at York Town, published in the Journal of York County Heritage, vol. 2, in 2011.

In 1991, at the age of 21, Helfrich pleaded guilty to criminal conspiracy to commit possession with intent to distribute, related to an arrest involving LSD and psychedelic drugs. He served 45 days in York County Prison. The convictions became public during his 2011 campaign for York City Council. Helfrich has spoken openly about the experience as part of a broader message about second chances and criminal justice reform, describing himself publicly as the only mayor in Pennsylvania with felony convictions.

== Environmental activism ==
Helfrich's public profile emerged through environmental advocacy in York. In 1988, he became concerned about pollution in Codorus Creek after observing the extent of industrial contamination. He went on to organize Codorusfest in 2001, a community creek cleanup effort, during which he was nicknamed "the freak that speaks for the creek" by a co-organizer. He worked with several environmental organizations including the Codorus Creek Improvement Project, Stewards of Lower Susquehanna, and Move Your Ash, and served as the Lower Susquehanna Riverkeeper before entering elected office.

== Political career ==
=== York City Council ===
Helfrich announced his candidacy for York City Council as a Democrat in 2011. His eligibility was challenged by then-Mayor C. Kim Bracey under Article II, Section 7 of the Pennsylvania Constitution, which bars those convicted of certain crimes from holding public office. York County Court of Common Pleas Judge Stephen Linebaugh ruled in Helfrich's favor in August 2012, finding he had not been convicted of an "infamous crime." Bracey declined to appeal. Helfrich took his seat on York City Council in January 2012. During his tenure, he served as vice president and assumed the council presidency on November 9, 2016, following the resignation of the seated council president.

=== 2017 mayoral election ===
In 2017, Helfrich ran for mayor as a Republican after losing the Democratic primary to incumbent C. Kim Bracey by more than 300 votes. He defeated Bracey in the general election on November 7, 2017, by 133 votes, becoming York's 25th mayor. Days before taking office in January 2018, six residents filed a legal complaint seeking to block him from assuming the mayoralty due to his prior felony convictions. York County District Attorney Dave Sunday declined to pursue the challenge, and the plaintiffs dropped it days after Helfrich was sworn in.

=== Mayor of York (2018–2026) ===
Helfrich took office on January 1, 2018, making criminal justice reform, rehabilitation, and community policing central themes of his administration. In 2020, at the height of racial tensions across the country, he appointed York native Michael Muldrow as police commissioner, a decision he later described as one of the best of his eight years in office. Under Muldrow's leadership, the city developed a Group Violence Intervention Initiative, appointing Tiffany Lowe — a formerly homeless woman and former drug dealer — to lead the program. Helfrich credited the initiative with producing the largest three-year drop in violent crime in the city's modern history, including an 82% reduction in violent crime overall.

Helfrich was re-elected in November 2021, defeating opponent Shareef Hameed with approximately 80% of the vote.

==== 2022 oath of office controversy ====
Following his re-election, Helfrich took his oath of office via Facebook Live on January 24, 2022 – 20 days after York City Council's reorganizational meeting on January 4. Under Pennsylvania's Third Class City Code, mayors are required to be sworn in within 14 days of the council's reorganizational meeting. Helfrich maintained he was not required to retake the oath, acting on advice from then-assistant city solicitor Jason Sabol that his original 2018 oath remained valid. The matter was referred to then-Attorney General Josh Shapiro and York County District Attorney Dave Sunday. In April 2022, eighteen electors — including former city council members and Helfrich's 2021 opponent Shareef Hameed — filed a petition to the Court of Common Pleas seeking his disqualification. York County Court of Common Pleas Judge Clyde W. Vedder denied the petition, ruling the three-day delay was insufficient grounds for removal and that Helfrich had never intended to refuse the oath. In February 2024, the Pennsylvania Commonwealth Court affirmed Helfrich's eligibility on procedural grounds, ruling the petition had not been properly filed.

==== Departure from office ====
In January 2024, Helfrich announced he would not seek a third term and initially endorsed Police Commissioner Michael Muldrow to succeed him. After Muldrow withdrew from the race, Helfrich briefly re-entered before stepping aside again following the candidacy announcement of former York City Council President Sandie Walker, whom he endorsed as his preferred successor. He delivered a farewell address in January 2026, noting he had faced eight separate legal and procedural challenges to his holding office over the course of his tenure.

== National media coverage ==
Helfrich's story of personal rehabilitation and unconventional approach to municipal governance attracted significant national media attention. In April 2022, Governing magazine featured him in a profile focused on his residence in Thomas Paine's former home. In March 2023, he was selected as one of 23 mayors featured in a special series by The Takeaway, a national public radio program produced by WNYC and distributed by New York Public Radio, hosted by Dr. Melissa Harris-Perry. The segment highlighted his criminal justice reform initiatives, his personal history, and his philosophy of York as "a place of second chances." He has appeared multiple times before national audiences on C-SPAN, including appearances in 2022 and 2024.

== Personal ==
Helfrich is a local historian with a published academic work on Thomas Paine's time in York. His research, The Question of Thomas Paine at York Town, was published in the Journal of York County Heritage in 2011. He has restored his 1761 home to its colonial-era character and counts an original copy of Paine's American Crisis Number 5, written in York, among his most prized possessions. He has a daughter named Lily.

Political offices
Preceded by C. Kim Bracey	Mayor of York, Pennsylvania; 2018–2026	Succeeded by Sandie Walker
