= The Belmont Theatre =

Theater and former cinema in York, Pennsylvania, U.S.

Coordinates: 39.972117°N 76.694755°W

- Interactive map of The Belmont Theatre
- Former names: York Little Theatre (1933–2016; 9–93 yrs ago)
- Address: 27 S. Belmont Street; York, Pennsylvania 17403; United States

Construction
- Built: 1949 (as Elmwood Theatre)
- Opened: 1953; 73 years ago
- Renovated: 2015
- Expanded: 1997

Website
- www.thebelmont.org

The Belmont Theatre, formerly York Little Theatre, is a community theater in York, Pennsylvania, founded on February 5, 1933, as part of the Little Theatre Movement.

== Early years ==
The theatre initially borrowed space from the local Women's Club, the York Collegiate Institute, and the local YWCA. Its first full-length performance was Lady Windermere's Fan at the Phineas Davis School Auditorium on December 14, 1933.

After two unsuccessful attempts at securing its own real estate, the theatre acquired a permanent home at the Elmwood Theatre, a former cinema built and opened in 1949. After a lease-purchase agreement was signed in July 1953, the theatre gained title to the building seven years ahead of schedule in May 1956.

== Leadership and growth ==
Bert Smith was artistic director from 1953 until 1982. Eric Bradley Long was artistic director until 2010. Rene Staub became artistic director in 2012, while Lyn Bergdoll became the theatre's executive director that year.

A 7,000-square-foot (650 m^{2}) addition to the theatre was completed in 1997, after more than $1 million was raised under the leadership of Henry Leader, brother of former Pennsylvania governor George M. Leader.

By 2012, the theatre recovered from the 2008 financial crisis, paying off debts and making long-overdue improvements to the building and stage equipment.

In early March 2026, Belmont reached an agreement for Creative York, an arts-supporting nonprofit organization whose executive director is Lyn Bergdoll, to assume the theatre's managerial and administrative duties. The theatre had been closed for reported renovations, with its next production to open in late April.

== Changes ==
According to the executive director, Lyn Bergdoll, the theatre was renamed after its street in mid-2016 due to a migration of the former name's meaning. While "little theater" originally connoted "community theater", it has more recently been applied to "children's theater" or "smaller productions".

The theatre's most enduring fundraiser has been an annual food stand at the York Fair, at which steak sandwiches are sold. The stand was started in 1957 by Betty Gerberick and run by volunteers. A partnership with the local Roosevelt Tavern began in 2017 to operate the stand from 2018 onward.

== Special events ==
In addition to its theatrical productions, the theatre has hosted various community and musical performances. In December 2015, the Unforgettable Big Band, a big band based in York, performed a tribute show honoring Frank Sinatra's 100th birthday to two sold-out audiences.

== Alumni ==
Notable theatre alumni include Rebecca Wisocky and Sam Freed.
