= 1969 York race riot =

Civil unrest in York, Pennsylvania, United States

- Part of Ghetto riots
- Date: July 1969
- Location: York, Pennsylvania
- Caused by: Racially polarizing murders
- Result: Investigations of murders; End of riots by police

Parties
| White rioters: White gangs; Other white rioters | Law enforcement: Municipal Police; National Guard | Black rioters: Black gangs; Other black rioters |

Casualties
- Deaths: 2
- Injuries: 80+
- Arrested: 100+

The 1969 York race riot refers to a period of racial unrest in York, Pennsylvania in July 1969. This period of increased racial unrest followed a period of significant racial tension, rioting and racial justice protests that were taking place in multiple cities across Pennsylvania and the nation, during and after the Civil rights movement — actions that had endeavored to abolish multiple forms of legalized institutional racism in the United States through primarily nonviolent methods between 1954 and 1968.

== Escalating racial tension and the murder of Henry Schaad ==
Racial tensions began to escalate in York, Pennsylvania in 1963. Black citizens of York protested police violence and discrimination at City Hall. Their demands for a biracial police review board were turned down by the all-white city council. Citizens continued to protest over the next few years and complained of police brutality and the use of police dogs to curb protests. During this time, the city saw the rise of several notorious all-white gangs. By the mid-1960s, York had become deeply racially divided, and in 1968 a series of white-on-black crimes incited retaliation in the form of fire-bombings and street brawls.

On July 17, 1969, with racial tensions at the boiling point, a black youth who burned himself playing with lighter fluid blamed a local white gang known as the Girarders. That would later be revealed as a lie, but not before the pent-up resentments of the black community turned violent. That same day, seventeen-year-old Taka Nii Sweeney was shot by an unseen gunman when York City Police Detective George Smith stopped him and his friends for violating the city's youth curfew. White and black gangs began fighting that afternoon. Eleven others were hurt when people in six blocks of the city reverted to rock-throwing, barricading and shooting from behind bushes and poles.

Fighting lasted through the night and into the next day. Nine more people were injured, including Officer Henry C. Schaad. Schaad, a twenty-two-year-old rookie with eleven months on the force, was riding in one of the police department's two armored trucks when he was struck by a bullet believed to have been fired by a black rioter. White gangs around the city prepared for revenge. Schaad languished in the hospital for nearly two weeks before succumbing to his injuries.

As Schaad lay dying, racial tension soared in the city. Fights broke out, buildings were set ablaze and police began barricading black neighborhoods. More than sixty people were injured, one hundred were arrested, and entire city blocks were burned.

== The murder of Lillie Belle Allen ==
On July 21, Lillie Belle Allen, a black woman from Aiken, South Carolina who was visiting York with her parents, was riding in a car driven by her sister, Hattie Dickson. Dickson turned the car onto North Newberry Street and was looking for a grocery store when she saw a man with a gun leaning out of a second-story window. Multiple members of two all-white gangs, the Newberry Street Boys and the Girarders, were on the street that night, and many of them were armed.

Dickson began to turn around in the intersection of Newberry Street and Gay Avenue but the car stalled. As more armed white men began coming onto their porches, Dickson panicked. Her parents, who were in the back seat, began praying. Her older sister, Lillie Belle Allen, jumped out of the car to get to the driver's seat and take the wheel. She flailed her arms screaming, "Don't shoot!" Multiple shooters opened fire from the street, rooftops and windows, fatally wounding Allen. More than one hundred rounds were fired at the car, and Allen was shot by several different types of bullets.

The day after Allen's death, Pennsylvania Governor Raymond P. Shafer declared a state of emergency and ordered an emergency curfew as two hundred National Guard troops arrived in York. Three days later the city settled down and the Guard left York.

Four prosecutors and four detectives spent two years trying to solve the Allen and Schaad murder cases, but people who knew about the fatal shootings kept silent, either because they were afraid or they didn't want to be seen as traitors. "It was tougher than pulling teeth," said Thomas V. Chatman Jr., who was lead detective on the murder investigations for the York City police. "There were witnesses. But no one wanted to tell you anything. People took sides according to race and didn't want to cooperate." Because there was distrust among blacks, prosecutors said they first tried to solve the Allen case, hoping that witnesses would then come forward to identify Officer Schaad's killer. They weren't able to acquire sufficient evidence to charge anyone, and both shootings went largely uninvestigated for the next thirty years.

== Investigations reopened ==
Then in 1999, The York Dispatch and the York Daily Record published articles looking back at the riots on their 30th anniversary. The articles raised questions in the community and renewed interest in the murder cases. York County deputy prosecutor, Tom Kelley, had his staff begin unearthing the case files and reinterviewing witnesses, and York County District Attorney Stan Rebert launched a grand jury investigation. They began the investigation with the gang believed to have been involved in Allen's murder, the Newberry Street Boys.

Prosecutors learned that three of the gang members had committed suicide over the years, but that another, who was suffering from terminal cancer, wanted to talk. Before he died he told investigators what he knew about the night Allen was killed. More developments came the following year after detectives visited the rural home of Donald Altland, another ex-member of the gang. Altland admitted nothing to the detectives, but confessed his role in the crime to his wife later that night. The next day Altland drove his truck to the Susquehanna River and shot himself in the head. He left behind a taped confession for the prosecutors and a message scrawled on a napkin, "Forgive Me, God."

On April 27, 2001, charges were filed for the first time in Lillie Belle Allen's murder. Two brothers, Robert Messersmith and Arthur Messersmith, both members of the Newberry Street Boys, an all-white gang, were charged with criminal homicide after witnesses told a grand jury they'd heard Robert Messersmith bragging about the killing. On May 10, 2001, two more former members of a white street gang in York were accused. Rick Lynn Knouse and Gregory Harry Neff, identified as former members of the Girarders gang, were accused after witnesses testified they'd been seen firing at the car carrying Lillie Belle Allen.

Eight days later, the day after winning the Democratic primary in his bid for re-election, York City mayor Charlie Robertson was arrested and charged in Allen's murder. The affidavit filed with his arrest stated that Rick Knouse told a grand jury that the mayor, who was a York police officer at the time of the riots, had given him the rifle ammunition that Mr. Knouse used to fire at Ms. Allen and had told him to "kill as many niggers as you can." Before a judge issued a gag order in the case, the mayor confirmed that he did shout "white power" as encouragement to an angry crowd while he was on duty during the riots, but denied supplying the ammunition. Amidst public outcry and calls for his resignation, Robertson dropped his bid for re-election one week later.

== Justice thirty years later ==
=== Justice for Lillie Belle Allen ===
Four members of the gang responsible for killing Allen committed suicide. Richard "Dickey" Wales killed himself in 1974, Robert Downey killed himself in 1979, and Michael Messersmith, the brother of Robert and Arthur Messersmith, killed himself in 1988. On April 11, 2000, Donald Altland, 51, committed suicide, a day after prosecutors interviewed him about Allen's death. Before killing himself, he recorded two tapes, one in which he described Allen's murder, and the other in which he begged his family for forgiveness. Before shooting himself, he wrote on a napkin, "Forgive Me God."

In all, ten white men were arrested in the spring of 2001 and charged with Allen's death. Seven reached plea agreements in August 2001, and pleaded guilty to lesser charges of criminal conspiracy in exchange for their testimony against the remaining defendants. Three stood trial, and on October 18, 2002, after thirteen days and more than one hundred witnesses, an all-white jury found Gregory H. Neff and Robert N. Messersmith guilty of second-degree murder, but acquitted York City mayor, and former police officer, Charles Robertson. Neff and Messersmith were sentenced to prison, with Neff receiving four and a half years to ten, and Messersmith nine to nineteen. A 10th defendant, Ezra T. Slick, pleaded no contest to attempted murder and conspiracy and was sentenced in May 2003 to two to five years in prison. Neff was paroled in April 2007. Messersmith was paroled in October 2011.

=== Justice for Officer Henry Schaad ===
That same year, three police officers, Rodney George, John Daryman, and Keith Stone, reopened the investigation of Officer Henry C. Schaad's murder, and on October 30, 2001, Stephen Freeland and Leon Wright were charged with first- and second-degree murder. An affidavit filed at the arraignment of the two men cited numerous witnesses who said they saw Mr. Freeland firing at the police officer's car. Both were later convicted of second-degree murder and sentenced to prison. Freeland received 9 to 19 years, the same sentence given to Robert N. Messersmith for killing Allen. Wright received 4 1/2 to 10 years, the same sentence given to Gregory H. Neff for killing Allen.

== See also ==
- List of incidents of civil unrest in the United States
