= List of mayors of York, Pennsylvania =

Political leader of York, Pennsylvania, U.S.

Mayor of York, Pennsylvania
- Incumbent; Sandie Walker since January 5, 2026
- Term length: Four years
- Inaugural holder: Daniel K. Noell
- Formation: 1887
- Website: Office of the Mayor

The mayor of York, Pennsylvania is the city's chief executive since its incorporation on January 11, 1887. The current mayor is the 28th, and two mayors were reelected non-consecutively.

== Mayors of York ==
Order	Person number	Mayor	Party	Term	Notes
1	1	Daniel K. Noell	Democrat	1887–1893	
2	2	George W.S. Loucks	Republican	1893–1896	
3	3	Charles W. Brandt	Democrat	1896–1899	
4	4	Frank Geise	Democrat	1899–1900	
5	5	Robert Gibson	Democrat	1900–1902	
6	6	Milton Gibson	Republican	1902–1905	
7	7	J. St. Clair McCall		1905–1908	
8	8	Jacob E. Weaver	Democratic	1908–1911	
9	9	John R. Lafean	Republican	1911–1916	
10	10	E.S. Hugentugler	Republican	1916–1928	
11	8	Jacob E. Weaver	Democratic	1928–1932	Served previously
12	11	Harry B. Anstine	Republican	1932–1942	
13	12	Harvey Werner		1942–1944	
14	13	John L. Snyder	Republican	1944–1948	
15	14	Felix Bentzel	Democratic	1948–1952	
16	15	Howard Eyster	Republican	1952–1956	
17	16	Fred A. Schiding	Democratic	1956–1962	
18	13	John L. Snyder	Republican	1962–1969	Served previously
19	17	Jessie M. Gross		1969–1970	First appointed female mayor
20	18	Eli Eichelberger	Democrat	1970–1974	
21	19	John D. Krout	Republican	1974–1978	
22	20	Betty Marshall	Democrat	1978–1982	First elected female mayor
23	21	William Althaus	Republican	1982–1994	49th president of the United States Conference of Mayors
24	22	Charlie Robertson	Democrat	1994–2002	Withdrew re-election bid after arrest
25	23	John S. Brenner	Democrat	January 7, 2002 – January 4, 2010	
26	24	Kim Bracey	Democrat	January 4, 2010 – January 2, 2018	First black mayor
27	25	Michael Helfrich	Democrat	January 2, 2018 – January 5, 2026	Ran as a Republican
28	26	Sandie Walker	Democrat	January 5, 2026 – present	
