= Kim Bracey =

American politician

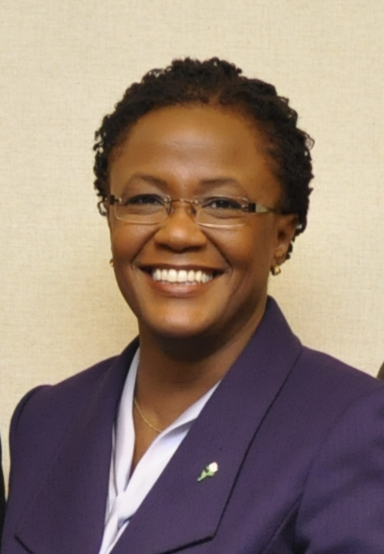

26th Mayor of York, Pennsylvania
- In office January 4, 2010 – January 2, 2018
- Preceded by: John S. Brenner
- Succeeded by: Michael Helfrich

Personal details
- Born: York, Pennsylvania
- Party: Democratic
- Spouse: Vernon
- Children: Two
- Profession: Politician

C. Kim Bracey is an American politician. She served as the 26th Mayor of York, Pennsylvania, from January 4, 2010, to January 2, 2018. She was the first African American mayor of the city and the second woman elected to hold the office. Betty Marshall, who was elected in 1977, served as the first elected female mayor of York from 1978 to 1982. Jessie M. Gross served as York's first female Mayor, being appointed to fill the remaining term of Mayor John L. Snyder, who died in office in October 1969.

== Biography ==
=== Early life ===
Bracey was born in York, Pennsylvania. She graduated from William Penn Senior High School and attended Bloomsburg University before enlisting in the United States Air Force in 1984. Bracey was honorably discharged from the Air Force in 1994, reaching the rank of technical sergeant (E-6). She moved back to York in 1994 after leaving the Air Force and took a position with the Crispus Attucks Association.

=== Political career ===
In 2003, York Mayor John Brenner appointed Bracey as the Director of the Department of Community Development. She served in the office from June 2003 until January 2009.

Mayor John S. Brenner announced on July 2, 2008, that he would not seek re-election in 2009, more than a year before the mayoral election. Brenner cited the impending birth of his second child as a major factor in his decision to retire from the mayor's office. He endorsed Bracey, who had served as his Director of the Department of Community Development, in the 2009 election. Bracey resigned as director of community development, in January 2009 which is the city's economic development agency, to pursue her campaign for mayor.

Bracey defeated three other Democratic candidates in the primary election on May 19, 2009. Bracey won the general election on November 3, 2009, beating her Republican opponent, Wendell Banks. Bracey received 2,582, or 81% of the total vote, while Banks placed a distant second with 602 votes, or 19%.

Bracey was sworn in as York's 24th mayor on January 4, 2010. She was re-elected in 2013, though lost a second re-election attempt in 2017 to city council president Michael Helfrich, who was inaugurated to succeed Bracey on January 2, 2018.

Political offices
Preceded by John S. Brenner	Mayor of York, Pennsylvania; 2010–2018	Next: Michael Helfrich
