= York, Pennsylvania =

City in the United States

- City
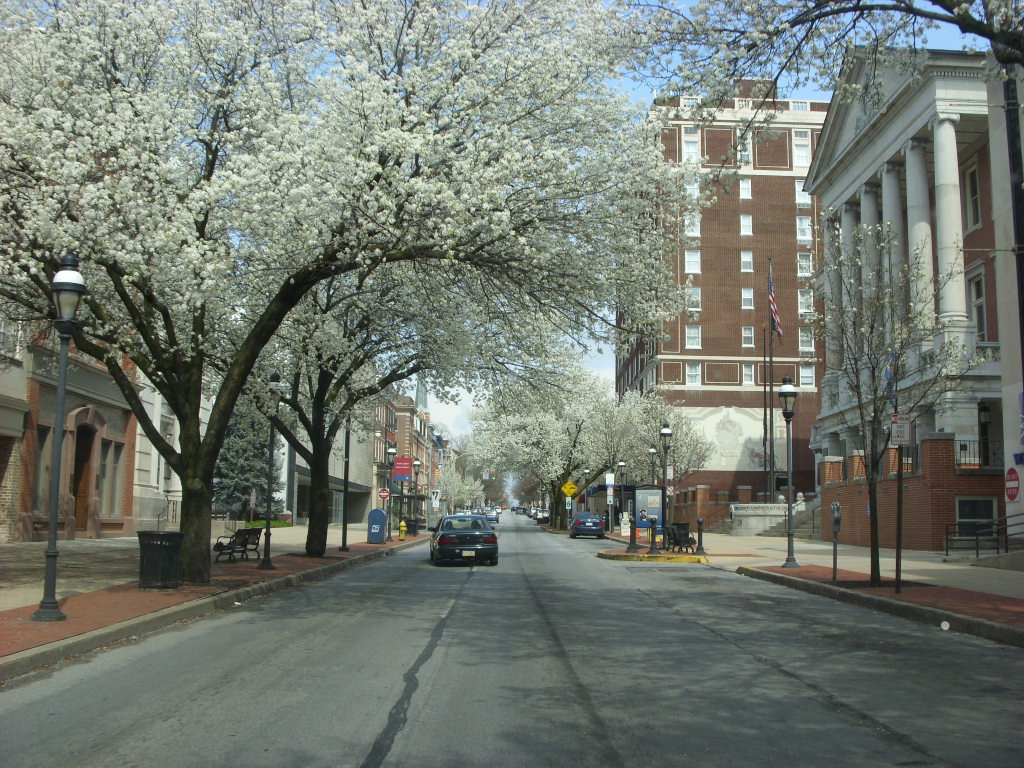
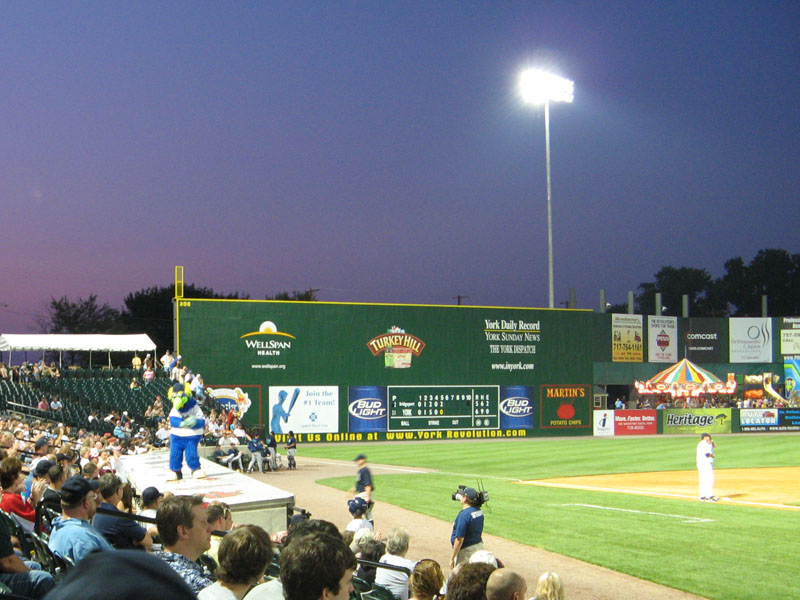
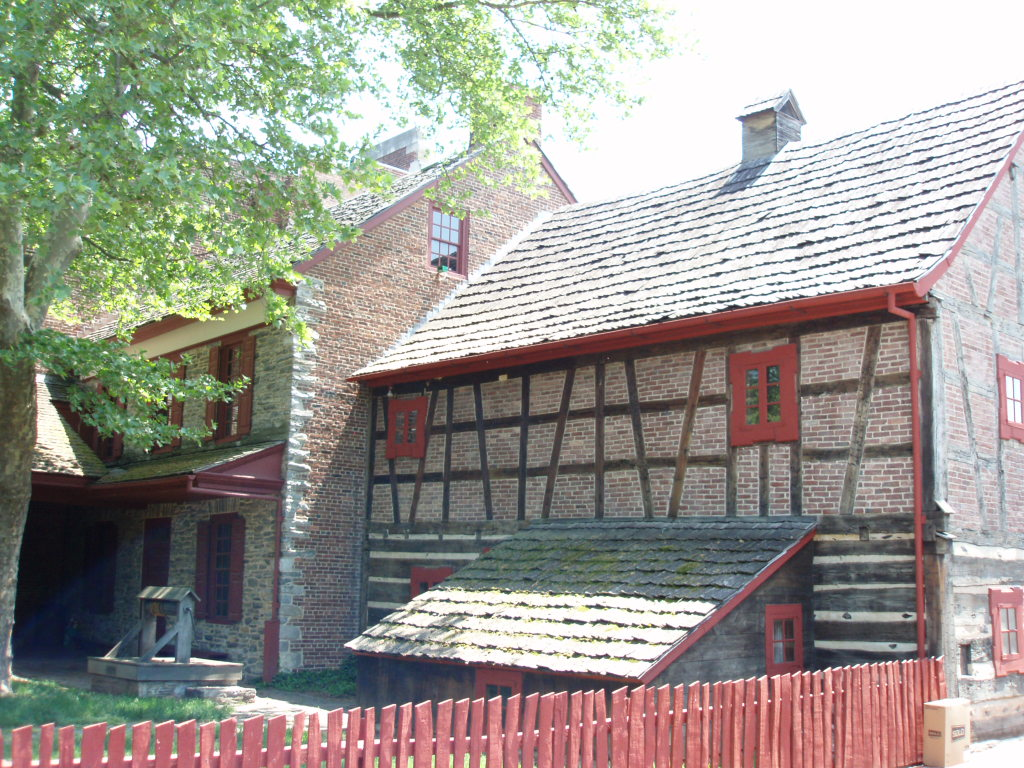
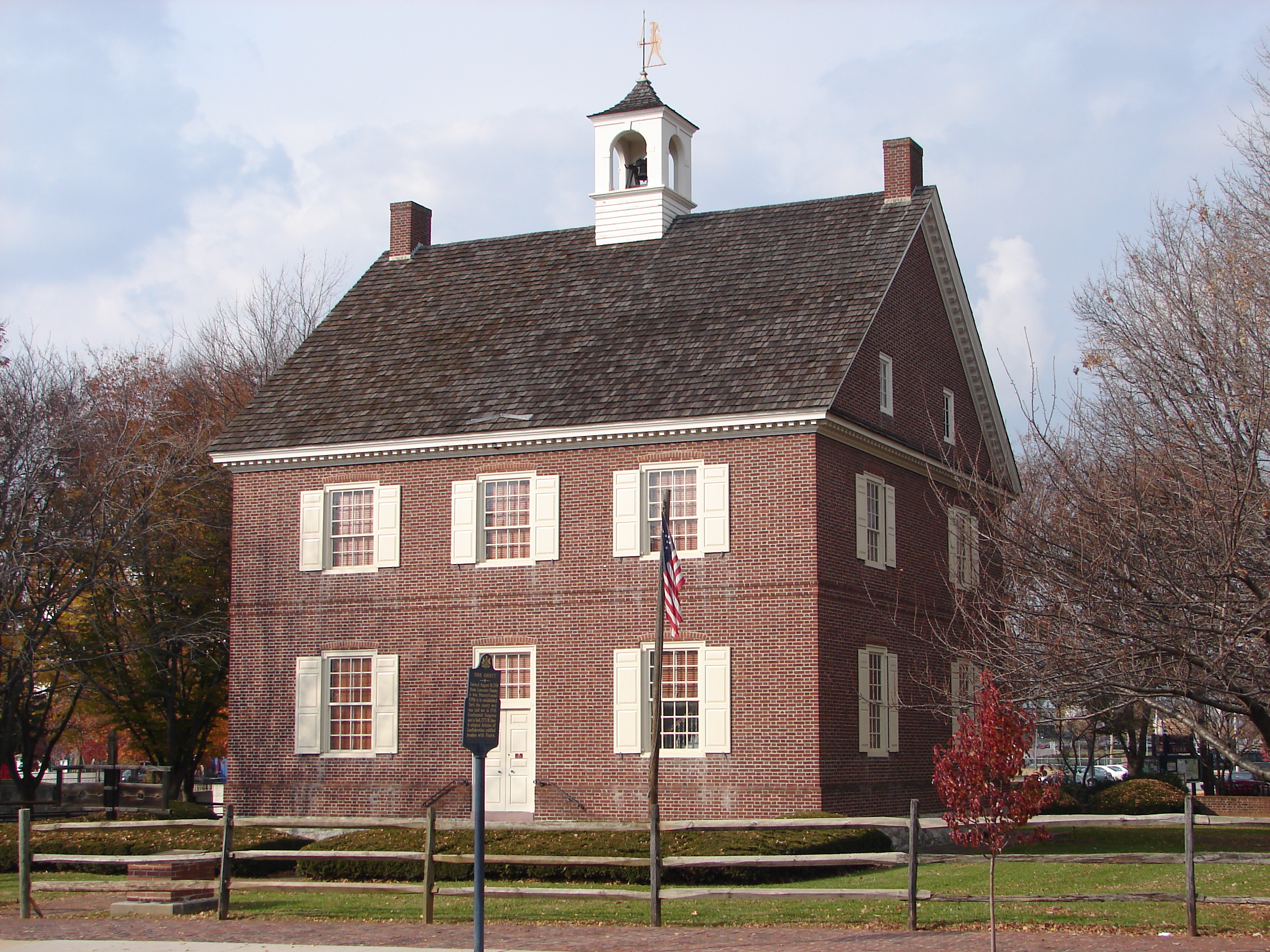
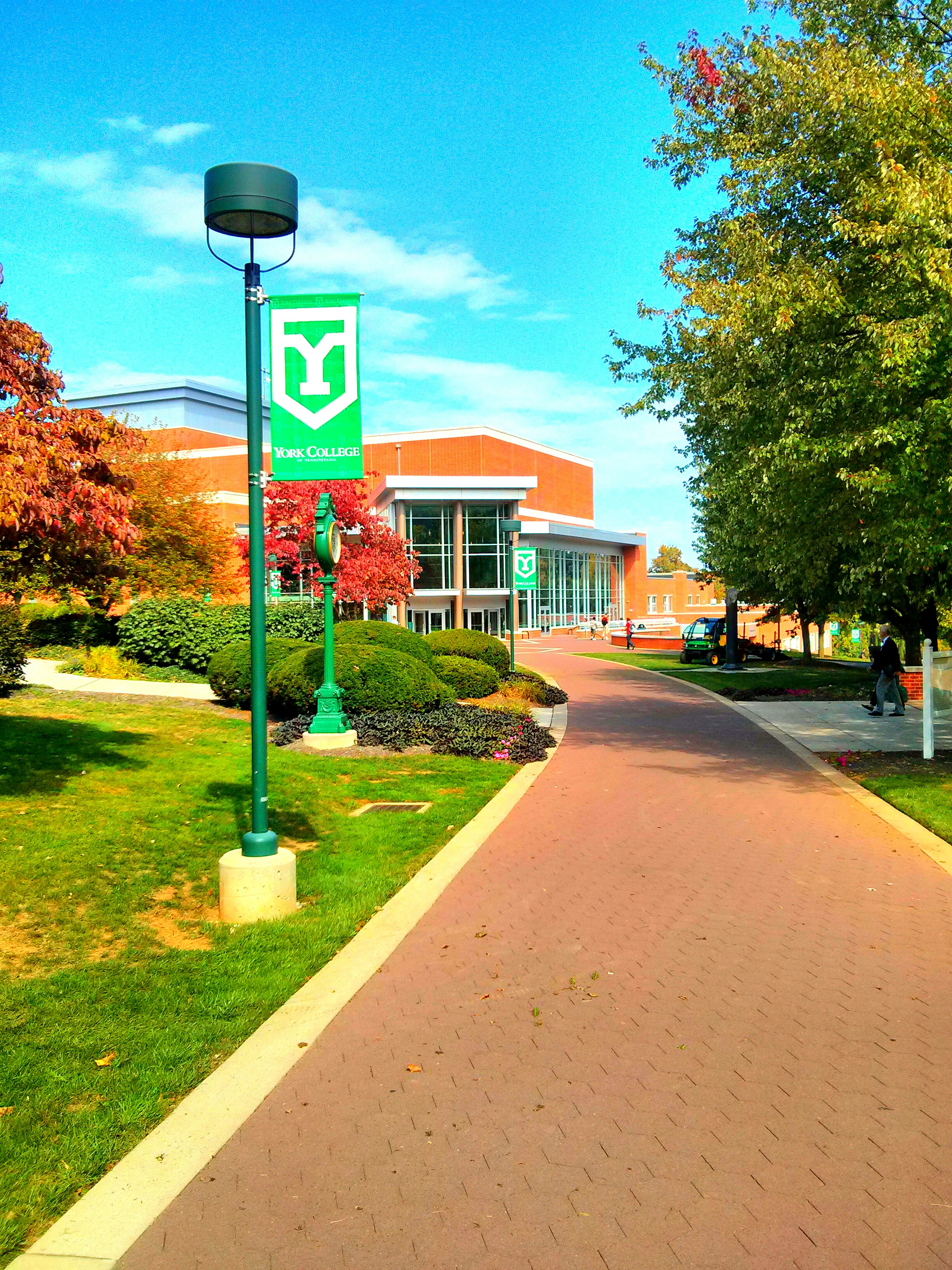
- Downtown York WellSpan Park Golden Plough Tavern Colonial Courthouse York College of Pennsylvania

- Flag Seal
- Nickname: The White Rose City
- Interactive map of York, Pennsylvania
- Location within Pennsylvania Location within the United States
- Coordinates: 39°57′46″N 76°43′41″W
- Country: United States
- State: Pennsylvania
- County: York
- Laid out: 1741
  - Borough: September 24, 1787
  - City: January 11, 1887

Government
  - Mayor: Sandie Walker (D)

Area
  - City: 5.34 sq mi (13.84 km^{2})
  - Land: 5.29 sq mi (13.71 km^{2})
  - Water: 0.050 sq mi (0.13 km^{2})
- Elevation: 367 ft (112 m)

Population (2020)
  - City: 44,800
  - Density: 8,380/sq mi (3,237/km^{2})
  - Urban: 238,549 (US: 168th)
  - Urban density: 2,109.6/sq mi (814.5/km^{2})
  - Metro: 456,449 (US: 121st)
- Time zone: UTC−5 (EST)
  - Summer (DST): UTC−4 (EDT)
- ZIP Codes: 17401, 17403–17405
- Area codes: 717 and 223
- FIPS code: 42-87048
- GNIS feature ID: 1215771
- Website: www.yorkcity.org

York is a city in York County, Pennsylvania, United States, and its county seat. Located in South Central Pennsylvania, the city's population was 44,800 at the time of the 2020 census, making it the tenth-most populous city in Pennsylvania. The city has an urban area population of 238,549 and has a metropolitan area population of 456,449.

Founded in 1741, York served as the temporary base for the Continental Congress from September 1777 to June 1778, during which the Articles of Confederation were drafted. It is the largest city in the York–Hanover metropolitan area, which is also included in the larger Harrisburg–York–Lebanon combined statistical area of the Susquehanna Valley.

== History ==
=== 18th century ===
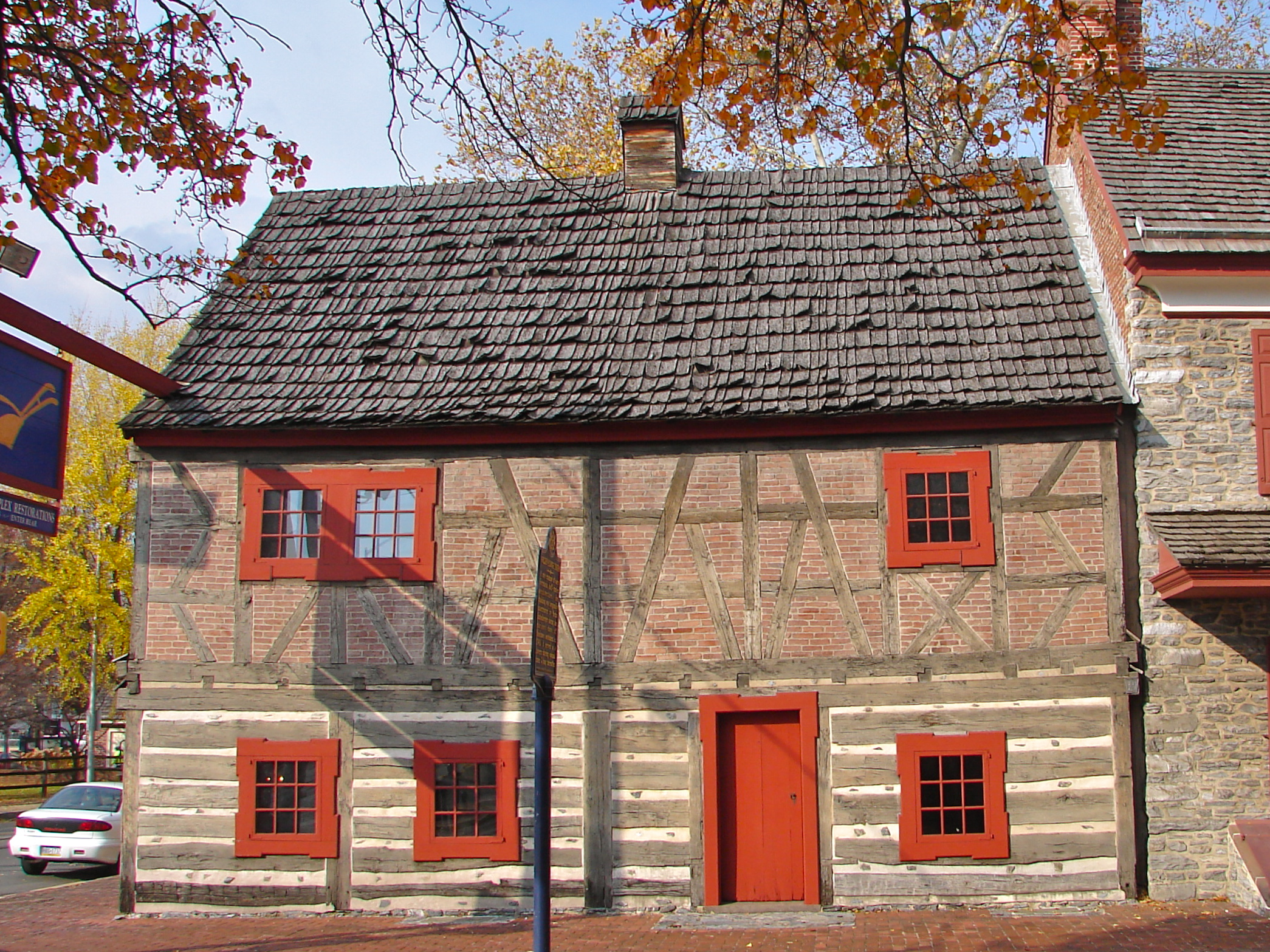
York's Golden Plough Tavern

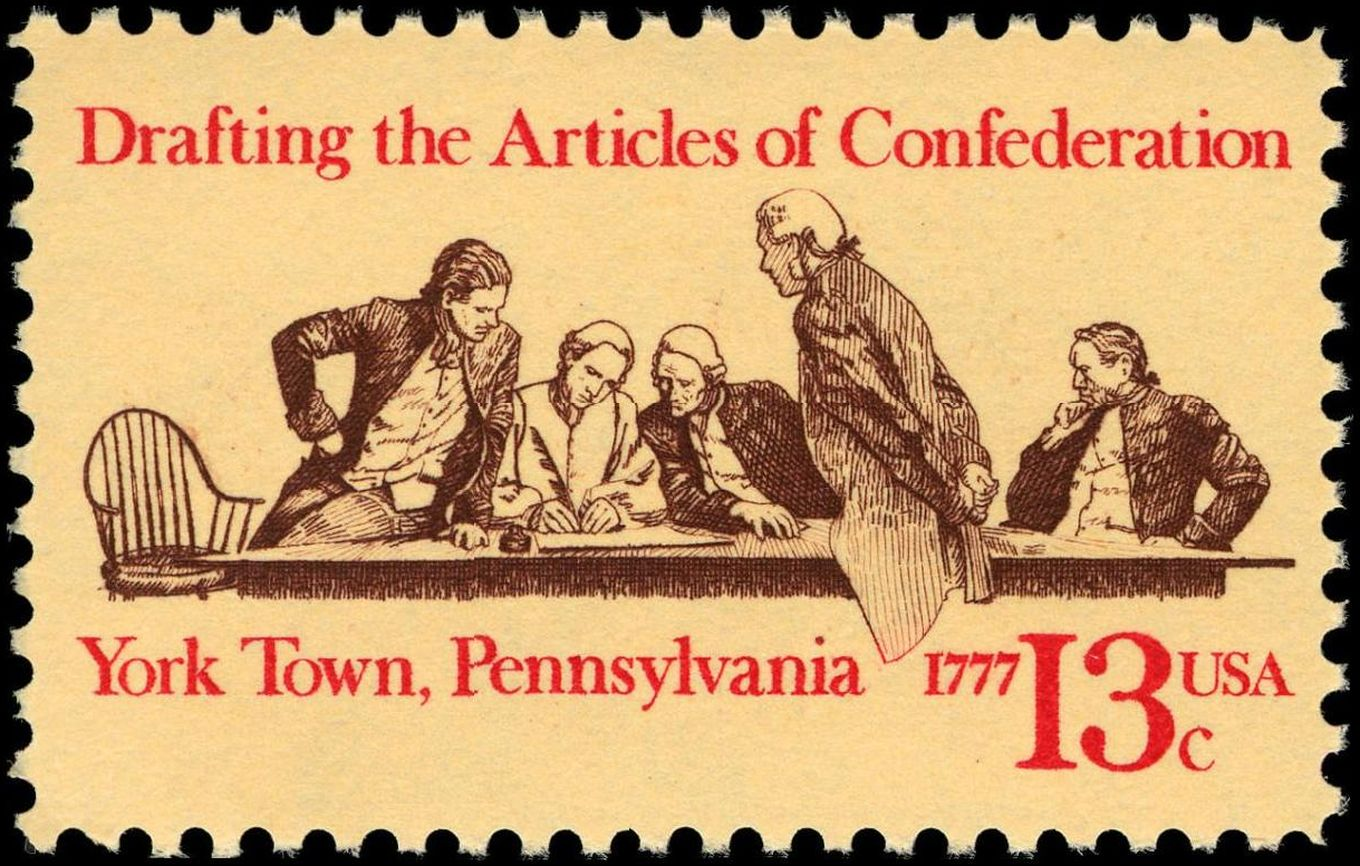
Commemorative stamp (1977)

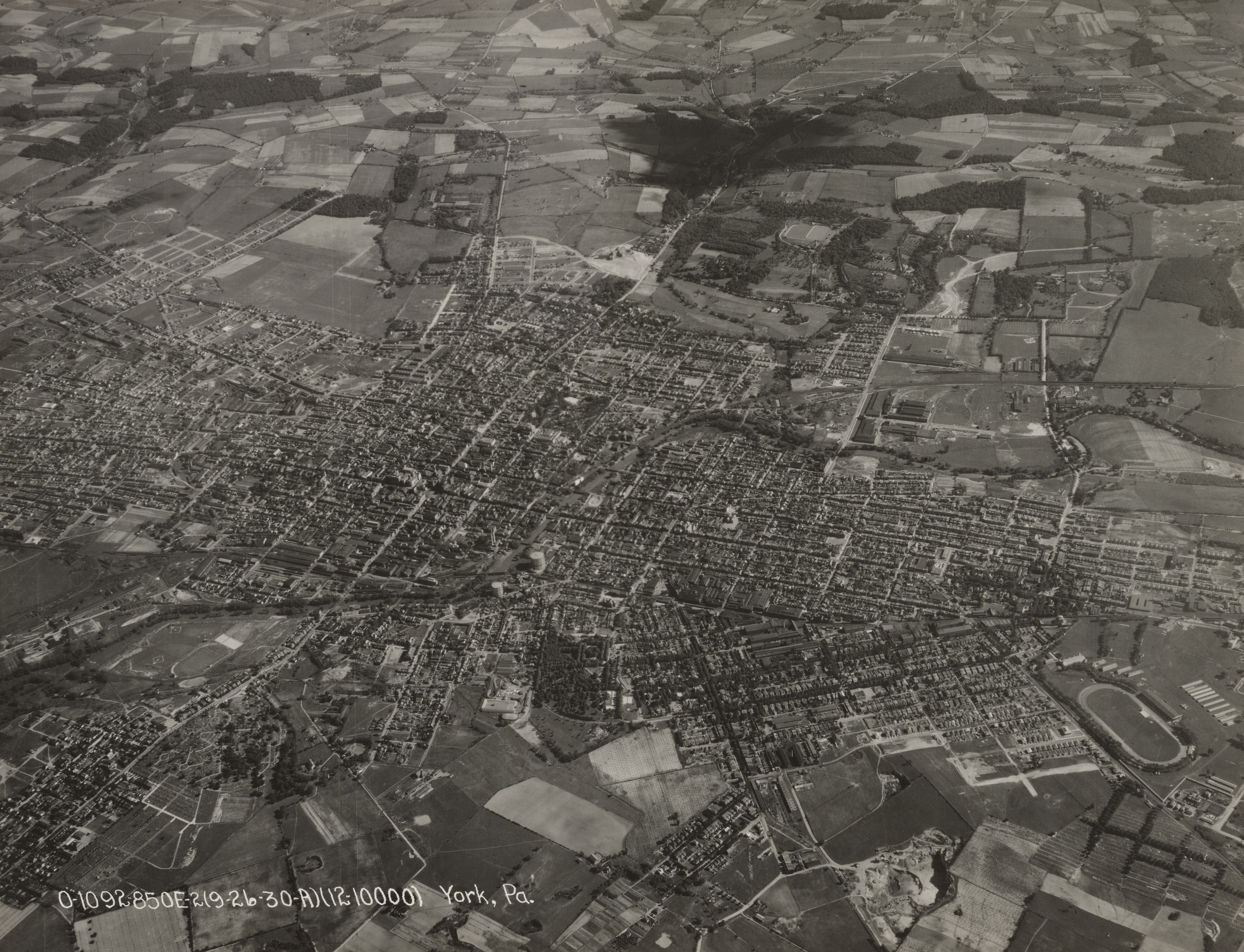
York in 1930 from the north

York was also known as Yorktown in the mid-18th to early 19th centuries. It was founded in 1741 by settlers from the Philadelphia region and named for the English city of the same name. By 1777, most of the area residents were of German or Scots-Irish descent. It was incorporated as a borough on September 24, 1787, and as a city on January 11, 1887.

York served as the temporary base for the Continental Congress from September 30, 1777, to June 27, 1778, during the American Revolutionary War (1775–1783). Congress drafted and adopted the Articles of Confederation in York, though they were not ratified until March 1781. Congress met at the Court House that was built in 1754. It was demolished in 1841 and rebuilt in 1976 as Colonial Court House.

York styles itself the first Capital of the United States, although historians generally consider it to be the fourth capital, after Philadelphia, Baltimore, and Lancaster (for one day). The claim arises from the assertion that the Articles of Confederation was the first legal document to refer to the colonies as "the United States of America". The argument depends on whether the Declaration of Independence would be considered a true legal document of the United States, being drafted under and in opposition to British rule. This does not, however, prevent local businesses and organizations in the York area from using the name, such as First Capital Engineering, First Capital EMS, and First Capital Federal Credit Union.

The Conway Cabal was a political intrigue against General George Washington that originated in the Golden Plough Tavern in York.

=== 19th century ===
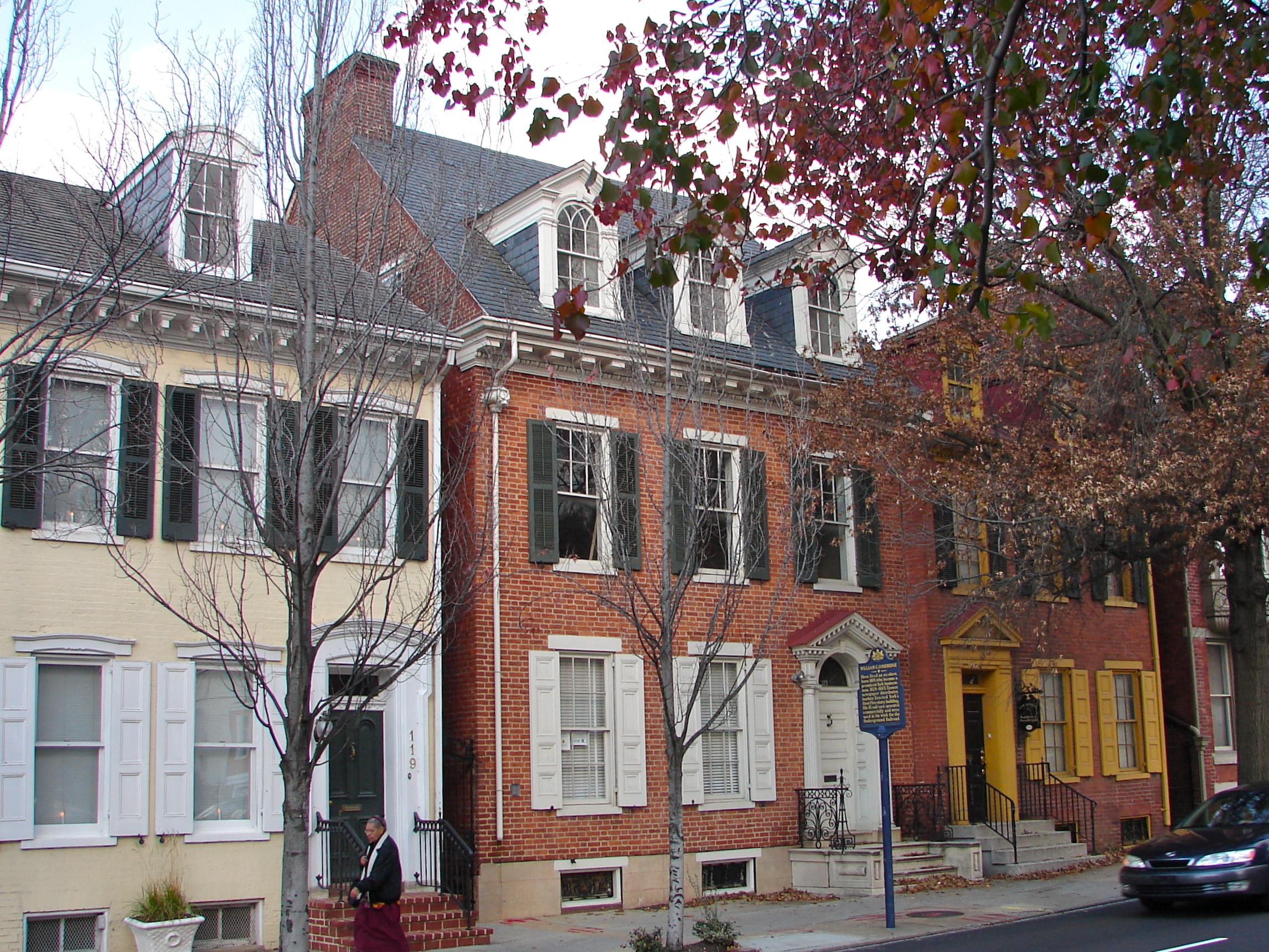
The York residence of William C. Goodridge, a successful black businessman who ran an Underground Railway station

According to U.S. census reports from 1800 through 1840, York ranked within the nation's top one hundred most populous urban areas.

During the American Civil War (1861–1865), York became the largest Northern town to be occupied by the Confederate army when the division of Major General Jubal Anderson Early spent June 28–30, 1863 in and around the town while the brigade of John B. Gordon marched to the Susquehanna River at Wrightsville and back. Early placed York under tribute status and collected food, supplies, clothing, shoes, and $28,000 in cash from citizens and merchants before departing westward, obeying the revised orders of Robert E. Lee.

The sprawling York U.S. Army Hospital on Penn Commons served thousands of Union soldiers who had been wounded during the battles of Antietam and Gettysburg.

During the Postbellum era (1865–1877), York remained a regional center for local agriculture, but increasingly became an important industrial center, with such industries as steam engines, railroad manufacturing, and papermaking achieving dominant status.

To this day, York still features unique architecture, ranging from colonial era buildings to large gothic churches.

=== 20th century ===
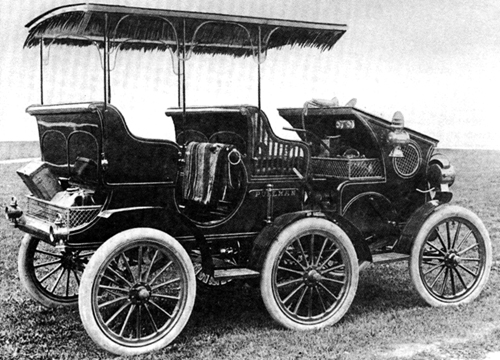
A six-wheeled Pullman automobile, manufactured on North George St. in the early 20th century

The York Motor Car Co. built Pullman automobiles on North George St. from 1905 through 1917. An early and unique six-wheeled prototype was involved in one of the city's first known automobile accidents. Another model was driven to San Francisco and back during roughly one month to prove its reliability several years prior to the creation of the Lincoln Highway which ran through town, connecting New York City and San Francisco.

The York area had also been home for more than 100 years to the Pfaltzgraff company, which built its first pottery factory in the area in 1895 and continued manufacturing in York until 2005.

Although currently produced by the Hershey Company, the York Peppermint Pattie was created in York in 1940.

==== Racial issues ====
Throughout the middle of the 20th century, several incidents of racial prejudice and social injustices occurred in the city. Between 1955 and 1970 there were several racial disturbances, most notably the 1969 York Race Riot, which resulted in the deaths of Lillie Belle Allen and Henry C. Schaad. These murders were largely left ignored until thirty-one years later, when allegations of murder and racial prejudice were raised against the mayor, Charlie Robertson. Additionally, the city commonly held unopposed Ku Klux Klan rallies and public meetings, fostering further racial tension. Though the murders of Allen and Schaad were solved and the perpetrators were apprehended, the actions, which originated back to the beginnings of the hate group, continue to the present day.

=== 21st century ===
In 2002, the city faced a budget shortfall of $1,000,000 (~$1.66 million in 2024). Mayor John S. Brenner's plan to raise the money by asking York County's 302,000 adult residents to donate $3.32 to the city received national attention. The plan, referred to by some as the "Big Mac" Plan, did not raise all of the funds sought.

After many years of attempting to secure funding for a stadium and a baseball team to play in it, the first decade of the century saw York realize both goals. In 2007, Santander Stadium (now WellSpan Park), home of the York Revolution, opened in the Arch Street neighborhood. The stadium, along with other large projects such as the York County Judicial Center and the Codo luxury apartment lofts, have come to symbolize York's extensive redevelopment efforts.

== Geography ==
According to the United States Census Bureau, the city has a total area of 5.3 square miles (14 km^{2}), of which 5.2 square miles (13 km^{2}) is land and 0.1 square miles (0.26 km^{2}) (1.14%) is water.

=== Climate ===
York has a humid continental climate (Dfa) with hot, humid summers and moderately cold winters. The mean annual precipitation total of 41.1 inches (1,040 millimeters) is fairly evenly spread throughout the year, and falls on an average of 126.6 days per annum. Record temperatures from the York COOP range from 107 °F (42 °C), set on July 2, 1901, down to −21 °F (−29 °C), recorded on January 28, 1925, and January 21, 1994; at York Airport, with a considerably shorter period of record, the range is 100 °F (38 °C), set on July 22, 2011, down to −12 °F (−24 °C) as recently as March 6–7, 2015. The York COOP also holds the official statewide 24-hour precipitation record of 13.5 in (340 mm) set on June 22, 1972, due to the impact of Hurricane Agnes.

Climate data for York, Pennsylvania (1991–2020 normals)
Month	Jan	Feb	Mar	Apr	May	Jun	Jul	Aug	Sep	Oct	Nov	Dec	Year
Record high °F (°C)	64 (18)	74 (23)	65 (18)	84 (29)	74 (23)	—	—	—	—	—	—	—	84 (29)
Mean daily maximum °F (°C)	41.2 (5.1)	45.3 (7.4)	54.5 (12.5)	67.2 (19.6)	76.5 (24.7)	83.9 (28.8)	87.7 (30.9)	86.0 (30.0)	79.7 (26.5)	68.2 (20.1)	55.7 (13.2)	44.9 (7.2)	65.9 (18.8)
Daily mean °F (°C)	31.2 (−0.4)	34.3 (1.3)	42.4 (5.8)	53.6 (12.0)	63.1 (17.3)	71.2 (21.8)	75.4 (24.1)	73.8 (23.2)	67.1 (19.5)	55.6 (13.1)	44.4 (6.9)	35.5 (1.9)	54.0 (12.2)
Mean daily minimum °F (°C)	21.3 (−5.9)	23.2 (−4.9)	30.2 (−1.0)	40.0 (4.4)	49.7 (9.8)	58.5 (14.7)	63.1 (17.3)	61.5 (16.4)	54.5 (12.5)	43.0 (6.1)	33.1 (0.6)	26.1 (−3.3)	42.0 (5.6)
Record low °F (°C)	—	—	—	42 (6)	74 (23)	—	—	—	—	—	—	—	42 (6)
Average precipitation inches (mm)	3.27 (83)	2.81 (71)	4.01 (102)	3.62 (92)	4.20 (107)	4.29 (109)	4.52 (115)	3.96 (101)	5.10 (130)	3.94 (100)	3.22 (82)	3.52 (89)	46.46 (1,180)
Average snowfall inches (cm)	8.5 (22)	8.2 (21)	3.9 (9.9)	0.2 (0.51)	0.0 (0.0)	0.0 (0.0)	0.0 (0.0)	0.0 (0.0)	0.0 (0.0)	0.0 (0.0)	0.5 (1.3)	3.3 (8.4)	24.6 (62)
Average precipitation days (≥ 0.01 in)	10.3	9.6	11.6	11.6	12.7	12.0	11.0	9.6	9.6	8.4	10.0	10.5	126.9
Average snowy days (≥ 0.1 in)	3.3	3.0	1.7	0.2	0.0	0.0	0.0	0.0	0.0	0.0	0.3	1.5	10.0
Source: NOAA

== Demographics ==
Historical population
Census	Pop.	Note	%±
1790	2,096		—
1800	2,503		19.4%
1810	2,847		13.7%
1820	3,107		9.1%
1830	4,216		35.7%
1840	4,779		13.4%
1850	6,803		42.4%
1860	8,603		26.5%
1870	11,003		27.9%
1880	13,940		26.7%
1890	20,793		49.2%
1900	33,708		62.1%
1910	44,750		32.8%
1920	47,512		6.2%
1930	55,254		16.3%
1940	56,712		2.6%
1950	59,953		5.7%
1960	54,504		−9.1%
1970	50,008		−8.2%
1980	44,619		−10.8%
1990	42,192		−5.4%
2000	40,862		−3.2%
2010	43,718		7.0%
2020	44,800		2.5%
2024 (est.)	45,241		1.0%
U.S. Decennial Census

York is the largest principal city of the York–Hanover–Gettysburg CSA, a Combined Statistical Area that includes the York–Hanover metropolitan area (York County) and the Gettysburg micropolitan area (Adams County), which had a combined population of 473,043 at the 2000 census.

=== 2020 census ===
As of the 2020 census, York had a population of 44,800. 38.1% were Hispanic or Latino, 32.4% were non-Hispanic White, 23.1% were non-Hispanic Black, 0.8% were Asian, 0.2% were Native American or Pacific Islander, and 5.4% were mixed or other.

As of the 2020 census, the median age was 32.7 years, 26.8% of residents were under the age of 18, and 11.5% were 65 years of age or older. For every 100 females there were 94.6 males, and for every 100 females age 18 and over there were 90.7 males age 18 and over.

As of the 2020 census, 100.0% of residents lived in urban areas while 0.0% lived in rural areas.

As of the 2020 census, there were 16,962 households in York, of which 33.8% had children under the age of 18 living in them. Of all households, 24.4% were married-couple households, 24.8% were households with a male householder and no spouse or partner present, and 39.6% were households with a female householder and no spouse or partner present. About 33.4% of all households were made up of individuals and 10.7% had someone living alone who was 65 years of age or older.

As of the 2020 census, there were 19,017 housing units, of which 10.8% were vacant. The homeowner vacancy rate was 2.6% and the rental vacancy rate was 9.0%.

Racial composition as of the 2020 census
Race	Number	Percent
White	16,889	37.7%
Black or African American	11,606	25.9%
American Indian and Alaska Native	293	0.7%
Asian	426	1.0%
Native Hawaiian and Other Pacific Islander	34	0.1%
Some other race	9,531	21.3%
Two or more races	6,021	13.4%
Hispanic or Latino (of any race)	17,076	38.1%

=== 2010 ===
As of the 2010 census, the city was 51.2% White, 28.0% Black or African American, 0.6% Native American, 1.2% Asian, and 6.3% were two or more races. 28.5% of the population were of Hispanic or Latino ancestry.

=== 2000 ===
As of the census of 2000, there were 40,862 people, 16,137 households, and 9,246 families residing in the city. The population density was 7,852.2 inhabitants per square mile (3,031.8/km^{2}). There were 18,534 housing units at an average density of 3,561.6/sq mi (1,375.1/km^{2}).

The racial makeup of the city was 59.75% White, 25.13% African American, 0.42% Native American, 1.40% Asian, 0.07% Pacific Islander, 9.40% from other races, and 3.83% from two or more races. Hispanic or Latino of any race were 17.19% of the population.

There were 16,137 households, out of which 30.9% had children under the age of eighteen living with them; 31.0% were married couples living together, 20.6% had a female householder with no husband present, and 42.7% were non-families. 33.1% of all households were made up of individuals, and 10.7% had someone living alone who was sixty-five years of age or older.

The average household size was 2.48 and the average family size was 3.17.

In the city, the population was spread out, with 28.4% under the age of eighteen, 11.4% from eighteen to twenty-four, 30.1% from twenty-five to forty-four, 19.1% from forty-five to sixty-four, and 10.9% who were sixty-five years of age or older. The median age was thirty-one years.

For every one hundred females, there were 93.0 males. For every one hundred females who were aged eighteen or older, there were 88.0 males.

The median income for a household in the city was $26,475, and the median income for a family was $30,762. Males had a median income of $26,792 compared with $20,612 for females.

The per capita income for the city was $13,439.

Roughly 20.0% of families and 23.8% of the population were living below the poverty line, including 31.8% of those who were under the age of eighteen and 15.8% of those who were aged sixty-five or older.

== Economy ==
York was the home of dental equipment and false teeth giant Dentsply Sirona until the company moved its headquarters to Charlotte, North Carolina, in 2019. Though founded in New York by four men, the company moved its headquarters to the site of its factory in the 1900s, where it was run by one of the four founders, George H. Whiteley. Dentsply Sirona is a NASDAQ listed company, and internationally known throughout the dentistry business.

York Barbell, which is located in Manchester Township, is a reseller of barbells and other equipment for weight training and bodybuilding, and is the home of the USA Weightlifting Hall of Fame.

A large Harley-Davidson motorcycle factory, which employs roughly half of Harley's production workforce, is located just northeast of York in Springettsbury Township.

The York area is also home to two major manufacturers of modern hydro-power water turbines, Voith Hydro in West Manchester Township and American Hydro in Hellam Township, both of which manufacture enormous parts in their plants.

Spring Garden Township, directly south of York, is the headquarters to York International, a Johnson Controls Company and one of the largest suppliers of HVAC systems in the United States. On February 2, 1998, a massive explosion occurred at the York International plant. A spark set off a leak in the nearby propane storage house, causing a blast that was felt up to twenty-five miles away, which blew out nearby windows and knocked down doors. Roughly twenty people were injured, and one person was killed in the explosion, which occurred during a shift change.

The Stauffer Biscuit Company, owned by Meiji Seika of Japan since February 2004, which was previously based in York, has produced animal crackers since 1871; it is currently based in Spring Garden Township.

Just north of York in East Manchester Township is one of only four Starbucks roasting facilities in the world.

The York area also boasts a BAE Systems Inc. facility in West Manchester Township which assembles various military tanks and equipment.

The P.H.Glatfelter paper company, founded in 1864, was headquartered in York until mid-2020 when it relocated to Charlotte, North Carolina. Glatfelter had sold its nearby Spring Grove paper mill in 2018. The paper mill is now operated by Pixelle Specialty Solutions.

In addition, Christmas Tree Hill, a popular national Christmas, home decor and gift retailer, has been based in York since its founding in 1971. Its flagship location is housed in the historic Meadowbrook Mansion, which was built in East York during the early 1800s. The six columns on the mansion's front porch were reused from the second York County Courthouse cupola, which had been located at 28 East Market Street from 1841 until it was taken down in 1898 to make room for the third courthouse.

== Arts and culture ==
=== Architecture ===
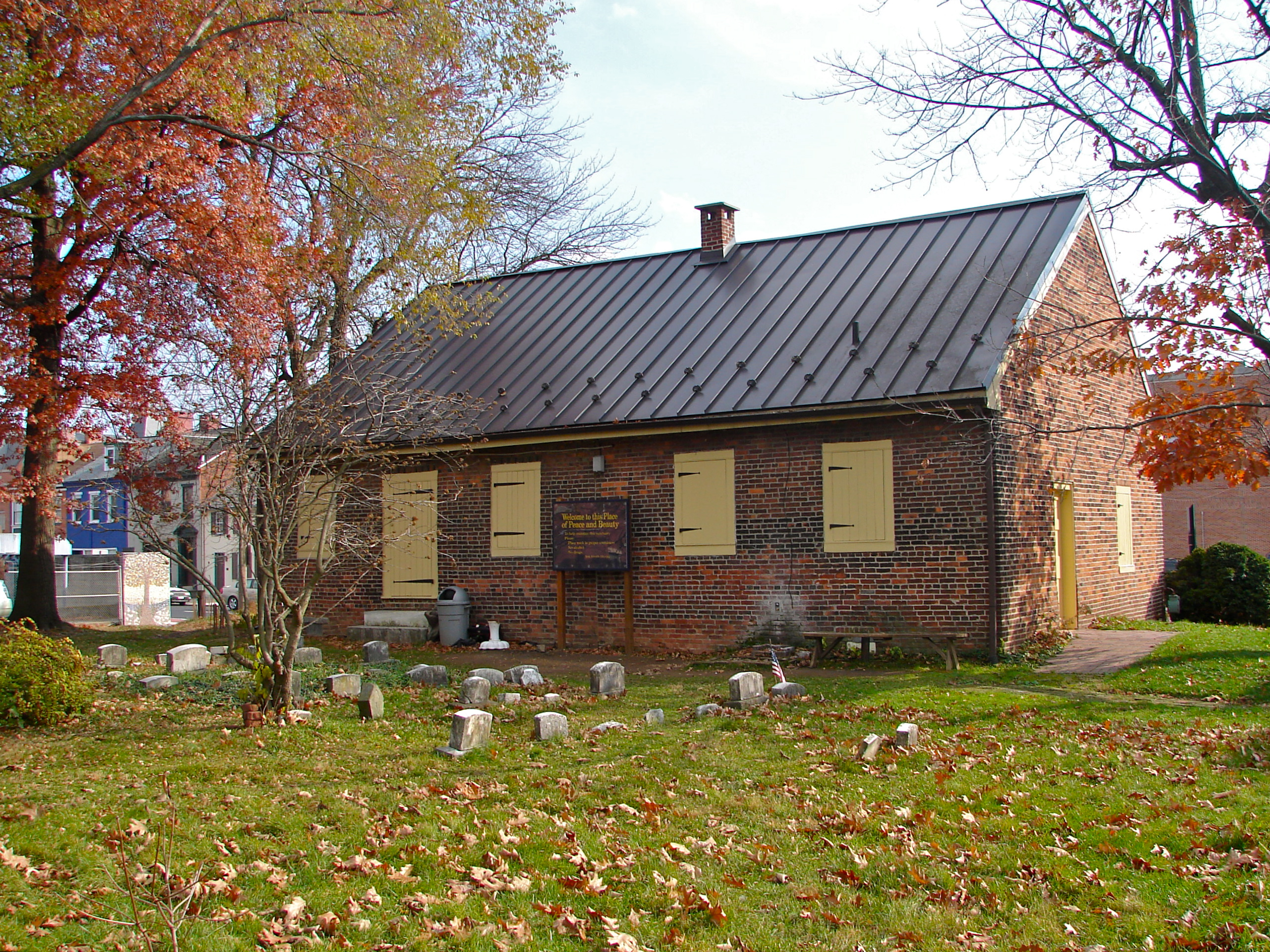
York Friends Meeting House

Historic sites include the 1741 Golden Plough Tavern, the 1751 General Horatio Gates House, the 1766 York Meetinghouse, the 1863 Billmeyer House, the 1888 York Central Market, and the 1907 Moorish Revival Temple Beth Israel.

Other notable buildings include the Laurel-Rex Fire Company House, Forry House, Farmers Market, Barnett Bobb House, Cookes House, United Cigar Manufacturing Company building, Stevens School, York Dispatch Newspaper Offices, and York Armory.

The city is also home to four national historic districts: Fairmount Historic District, Northwest York Historic District, Springdale Historic District, and York Historic District.

In 2025, York's downtown streets were recognized by Reader's Digest as among the 20 most beautiful in the U.S.

=== Fairgrounds and vendors ===
Much of York's culture represents the city's evolving role as an agricultural and industrial center. The historic York State Fair, which claims to be the country's oldest, traces its roots to 1765. It runs every year in late July for ten days, encompassing an entire week and two weekends. In addition to typical fair attractions, such as rides, games and contests, it also wins regional recognition for hosting many musical artists, such as Alabama, Gretchen Wilson, Carrie Underwood, Toby Keith, and Lynyrd Skynyrd.

The fairgrounds, branded the York Expo Center, also hosts the annual National Street Rod Association Street Rod Nationals East, the largest annual street rod event in the Eastern US. The event brings thousands of street rods into the city for a few days in June. On Friday afternoons of the event, the city holds a parade through the center of the city for participating vehicles.

York City Recreation and Parks helps sponsor the Olde York Street Fair each year on Mothers Day, the second Sunday of May – a tradition since the early 1980s. In recent years, more than 150 art, craft and food vendors have lined Market and George streets. Average attendance was 60,000 people as of 2004, according to city officials.

=== Theatre ===
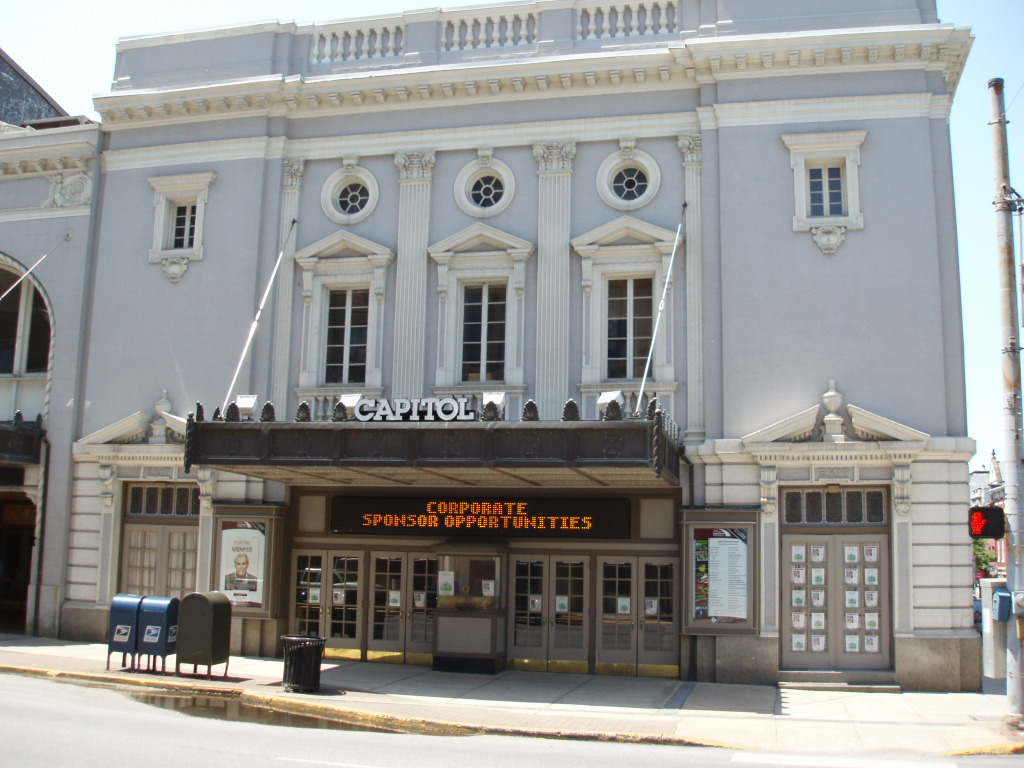
Part of York's Appell Center for the Performing Arts in 2007

York is home to DreamWrights Center for Community Arts, The Belmont Theatre, the Pullo Center at Penn State York and the Appell Center for the Performing Arts, formerly known as the Strand-Capitol Performing Arts Center, which hosts nationally acclaimed acts in York. Performers here have included Kenny G, Bill Cosby, B.B. King, Béla Fleck, and George Carlin.

The historic Capitol Theatre also features many independent and foreign films, making it the only venue in York (and sometimes the entire Susquehanna Valley) to feature some rare, yet critically acclaimed films. The Strand Studio has also branched out and offers live music, usually jazz and acoustic, for the community. In 2017, DreamWrights underwent the largest renovation in its twenty-year history, adding a second performance space among other improvements.

=== Heritage ===
The York County History Center (the History Center) offers three museums, historic sites, research library, and archives all located within the City of York, PA. The organization traces its roots to 1895 as the Historical Society of York County. Over the last 125 years, three moves and two name changes the History Center has strived to preserve and interpret the history of York County from its earliest roots to the current day with an emphasis on citizens of York County, its agricultural roots and local manufacturing. In addition, the History Center offers lectures, workshops, organ concerts, and numerous curriculum programs for secondary schools. In 2024, The York County History Center opened its new home at 121 North Pershing Ave by reconstructing what had been the original electric generating steam plant built by Edison Power and Light. Situated along the corridor of the York County Heritage Rail Trail, three primary locations of the History Center are an easy walking distance of each other along three blocks of the rail trail. The Colonial Complex includes two restored 18th century buildings known as the General Gates House and Golden Plough Tavern with an early 19th century log home. The property is anchored by a replica summer kitchen and a four-square herb garden. A fourth building stands across the street as a modern replica of York’s Colonial Courthouse originally located in York’s center square where the first Continental Congress met to draft the Articles of Confederation in 1754. Two blocks south of the Colonial Complex is the Agricultural and Industrial Museum (AIM). The Museum originated with a group of York businesses and merged with the Historical Society of York County in 1999. Located in a former factory complex, AIM features two floors of exhibits highlighting 200 years of transportation and agriculture in the county. Many of the exhibits feature hands-on experiences for visitors of all ages. The History Center also manages the York County Fire Museum. Situated in the original 1903 Royal Fire House it is located at the intersection of W. Market and Carlisle Ave. The Fire Museum holds more than 225 years of firefighting equipment representative of the 72 fire companies of York County.

=== Music ===
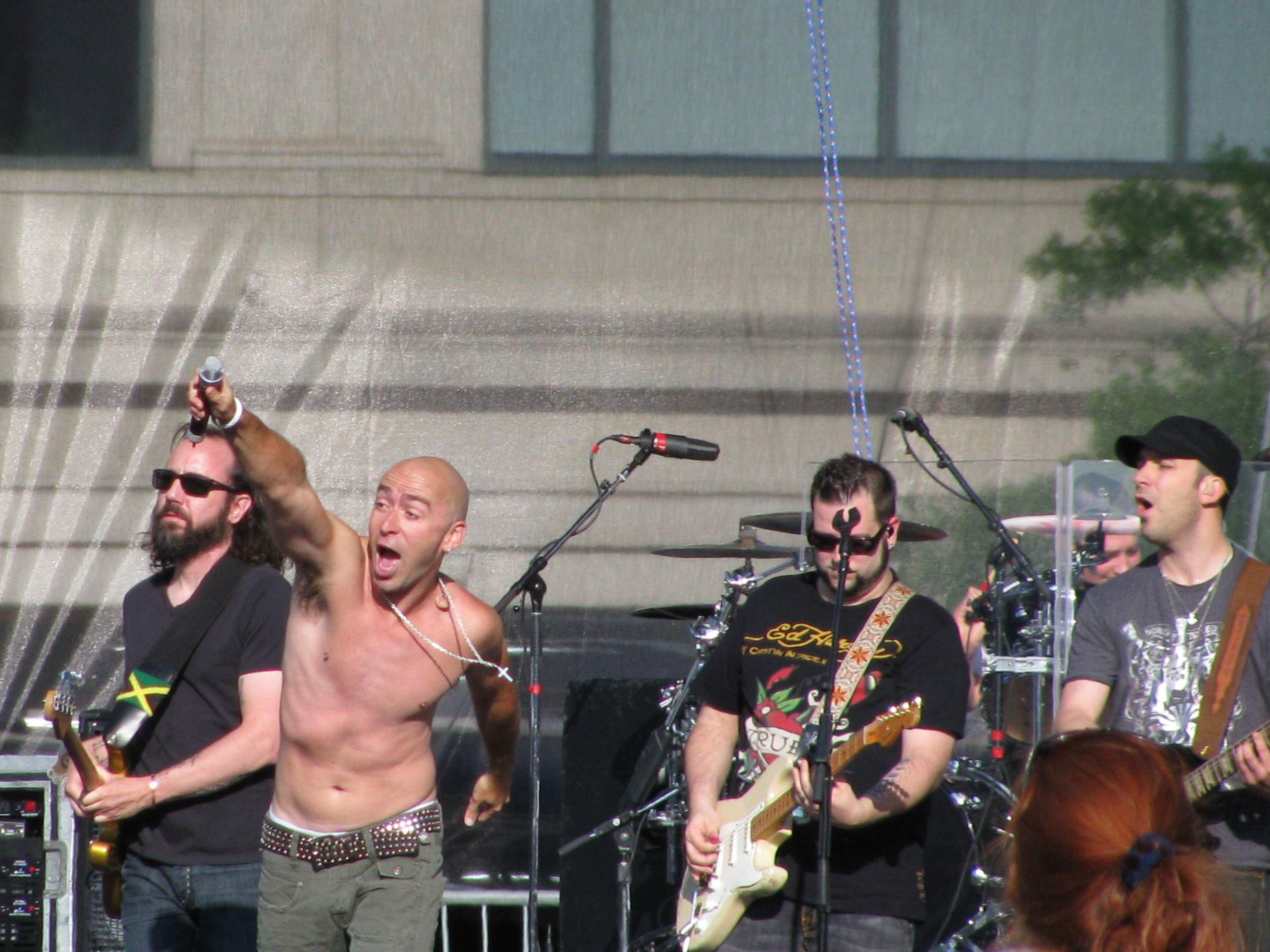
Live, a leading alternative rock band from York, performing in May 2008

The York Factory Whistle holds the world record for the loudest music without amplification from a non-musical instrument. Every Christmas Eve, the whistle uses a compressor to create air pressure, then releases it through a series of tubes using a device much like a slide whistle. (Prior to 2010, the pressure was created using steam produced by a boiler.) The music has had a loudness of 140 dB and can be heard ten to twelve miles away with proper weather conditions. Christmas music is played for a short time around midnight. It is thought that this annual tradition was started around 1925. Other sources date the tradition circa 1888 or earlier. The annual concert has been performed by members of the Ryan family since the 1950s. The factory whistle master since 1955 is Donald Ryan.

After the New York Wire Cloth Company plant closed in 2013, Metso moved the whistle to its factory in York and continued the annual concert tradition. Metso announced in August 2015 that it would close its York plant by the end of March 2016. As of December 2017, the building was still owned by Metso and the annual twenty-five-minute York Factory Whistle Concert remained scheduled, along with two daytime rehearsal sessions.

By December 2018, the hosting factory building was owned by 240 Arch LLC, and the air compressor (to be moved there for rehearsals and the concert) was trailer-mounted. Another early Christmas concert and Saturday-before practice were announced for 2019.

The alternative rock band Live is from York. Many of Live's songs are about the town including "Shit Towne" from their most successful album Throwing Copper.

Several community bands that formed during the 19th and early 20th centuries continue to perform in York as it is the closest city to the groups. They include the Emigsville Band of Emigsville, Spring Garden Band of Spring Garden Township, Brodbecks Band of Jefferson, Red Lion-Felton Band of Red Lion, and Twin Rose Community Band of Wrightsville. Donald Ryan, the Factory Whistle Master, previously served as a Director of the Emigsville Band. The Unforgettable Big Band, a big band founded in 2000, features volunteer musicians from the area, and performs across the Mid-Atlantic.

York is home to many veteran as well as up-and-coming talented artists and musicians from all genres including funk, blues, jazz, rock, experimental, country, and bluegrass. The rock band Hexbelt is known for its brand of "Susquehanna Hexbelt Swing" music. York hosts a variety of open mics and underground venues such as the Sign of the Wagon and The Depot. Astro Lasso, an electronic indie pop band from York managed by Frankie Muniz, toured with We the Kings in 2017.

The York chapter of the Barbershop Harmony Society, performing as the White Rose Chorus, was founded in 1945.

=== Shopping ===
The area's main shopping centers are York Galleria and West Manchester Town Center.

== Sports ==
Club	League	Sport	Venue	Capacity	Founded	Championships
York Revolution	ALPB	Baseball	WellSpan Park	5,200	2007	(3) 2010, 2011, 2017
York Buccaneers	ABA	Basketball	Voni Grimes Gym	200	2015	

=== Baseball ===
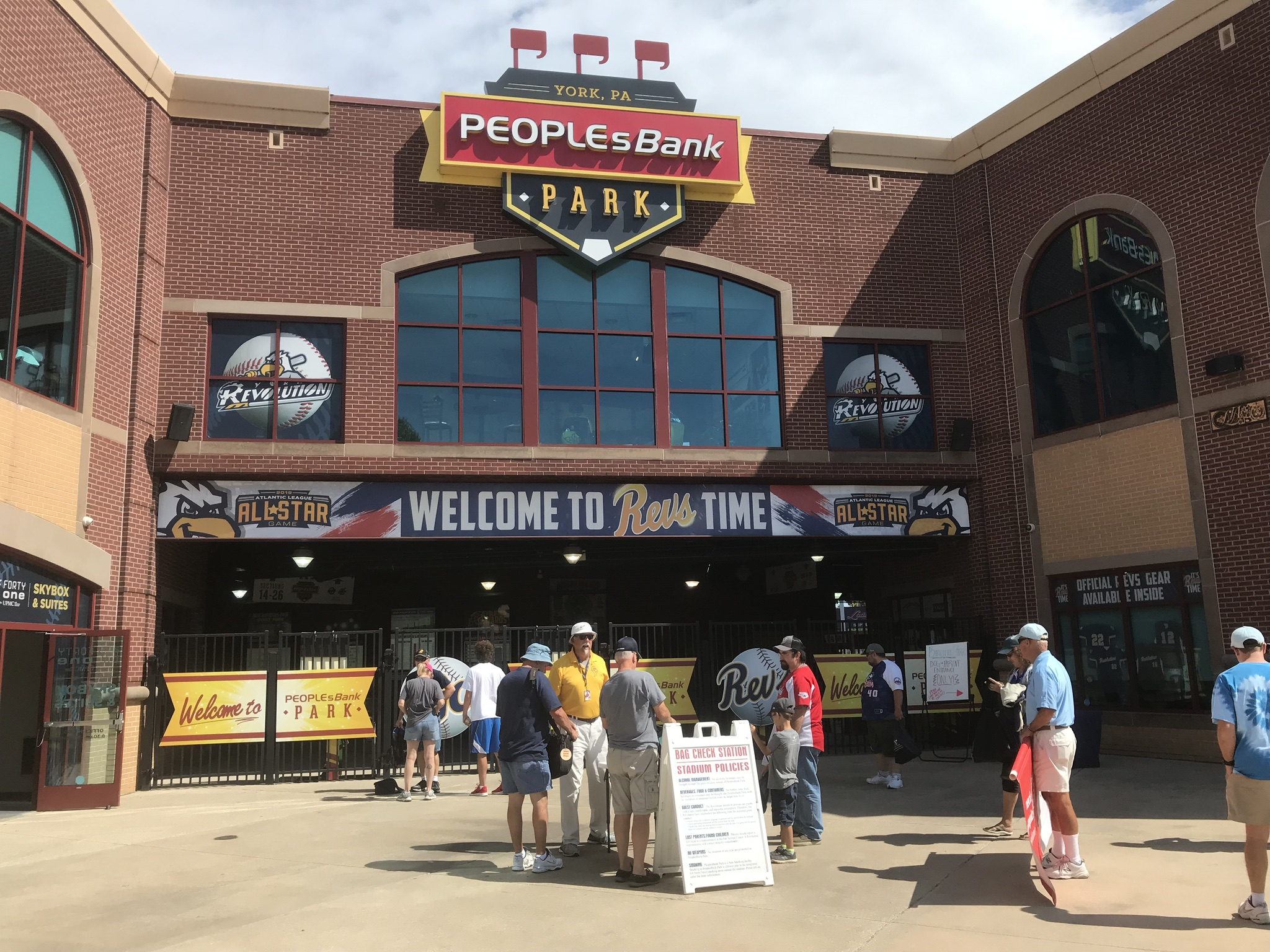
Entrance to WellSpan Park, then known as PeoplesBank Park

The York Revolution plays in the independent Atlantic League of Professional Baseball. After thirty-six years without professional baseball, the Revolution arrived in 2007 to fill the void left by the departed York White Roses. The Revolution is named after the city's colonial past, when the Continental Congress met in York and passed the Articles of Confederation during the Revolutionary War, and continues the old baseball rivalry between York and the nearby city of Lancaster. The Revolution plays at WellSpan Park in York's Arch Street neighborhood, which features a plaza and statue in honor of MLB Hall of Fame third baseman Brooks Robinson, a one-time member of the aforementioned White Roses, with whom he made his professional baseball debut in 1955. Prior to his death, Robinson served as a special assistant and advisor to Opening Day Partners, the group largely responsible for bringing professional baseball back to York.

WellSpan Park has the distinction of having the tallest wall in baseball. At thirty-seven feet, eight inches, the left field wall of York's ballpark surpasses the height of the Green Monster at Fenway Park, the home of the Boston Red Sox.

=== Football ===
The people of York (the White Rose City) and the similar city of Lancaster (the Red Rose City) across the Susquehanna River often engage in rivalry and competition that has its roots in the Wars of the Roses. Both cities take their names from the English cities, York and Lancaster, from which the opposing royal houses took their names in the fifteenth-century wars.

The War of the Roses All-Star Game was formerly played in York on Thanksgiving Day from 1983 to 2005. The game pitted the best high school football players in their senior seasons from the York-Adams League against a similar team from the Lancaster-Lebanon League. As the game only involved seniors and occurred during the first weekend of the PIAA District 3 football playoffs (players on teams which qualify for the playoffs do not participate), it is the final high school football game for each of the participants. As of 2023, there was some discussion about reviving the event.

Former Minnesota Vikings, Atlanta Falcons, and San Francisco 49ers defensive lineman Chris Doleman graduated from York's William Penn High School. York was the birthplace of former New York Giants Linebacker Andre Powell, former Miami Dolphins running back Woodrow (Woody) Bennett, former Los Angeles Raiders and Atlanta Falcons Tackle/Guard Lincoln Kennedy and former Atlanta Falcons safety Omar Brown. Tampa Bay Buccaneers head coach, Bruce Arians, is also a graduate of William Penn Senior High School (1970). New York Giants Offensive Tackle William Beatty is also a York, Pennsylvania native. Former Pittsburgh Steelers fullback Jon Witman graduated from Eastern York High School.

The York Capitals indoor football team was founded in 2012 and began play with the American Indoor Football league in April 2013. The team moved to Harrisburg after its 2015 league championship and was renamed the Central Penn Capitals before it folded in 2016.

=== Other sports ===
The Bob Hoffman Auditorium at York Barbell hosts a variety of powerlifting, Olympic lifting, strongman and bodybuilding competitions and shows.

York is home to the "Plywood Hoods", a group of BMX freestylers, including Kevin Jones, who gained broad acclaim in the 1980s and 1990s.

York is also the home of the York County Silver Bullets semiprofessional football team (Colonial Football Alliance). In its 2006 inaugural season, the team had a record of 5–5 and gained a playoff berth, though lost in its first round.

"The Pogo Squad", a group of about twelve extreme pogo performers, is located in York. It participates in area events, including the York St. Patrick's Day Parade, and perform shows. A photo of one member's pogo stunt against a sunset background won first place out of over eight hundred entries in a 2007 York newspaper photo contest.

York was also home to the Thunder D'ohm Skateboard Park, now defunct. A new park, "Reid Menzer Memorial Skatepark", was built and named for a York Catholic High School student who was killed while riding a skateboard.

York US30 was a drag strip just outside York. It held the 1965 Super Stock championships – "the largest one day drag race" in the United States. An annual Musclecar Madness event is held in York to commemorate the defunct strip.

York will host the 2019 PDGA Amateur Disc Golf World Championships, having won against six other tournament-hosting bids. The tournament director will be Chas Ford. Disc golf courses to be used include those at Gifford Pinchot State Park, Codorus State Park, Muddy Run, and more. The week-long event will take place in mid-July.

== Government ==
York was featured during the 2008 U.S. Presidential Election, when National Public Radio's Michele Norris and Steve Inskeep chose to showcase the city in "The York Project: Race & the '08 Vote." The program was aired as a seven-part series and featured different York citizens discussing race relations, racial perceptions, and the emotions inspired by the 2008 election. Norris stated that York was chosen due to its central location in a battleground state, its rich history (including its strained race relations), and demographics. On June 19, 2009, Norris announced on the air that she was taking time off to write a book inspired by her conversations "with a diverse group of voters" in York, and The Grace of Silence: A Memoir was published in September 2010.

In 2009, Kim Bracey won the Democratic primary and became the favored candidate for mayor. She won the general election in November against Republican opponent Wendell Banks and took office on the first Monday in 2010 as the city's first African-American and second woman mayor. Bracey won reelection in November 2013 against Libertarian challenger Dave Moser.

Michael Helfrich defeated Bracey by only 133 votes in 2017. A Democratic city council president, Helfrich ran for mayor as a Republican after losing the Democratic primary election to Bracey by just over 300 votes. Helfrich was inaugurated as mayor on January 2, 2018. He announced in late December 2023 that he would not run for election in 2025.

On Monday, January 5, 2026, city council president Sandie Walker was sworn in as York's 28th mayor, becoming the second African American women to serve as mayor.

== Education ==
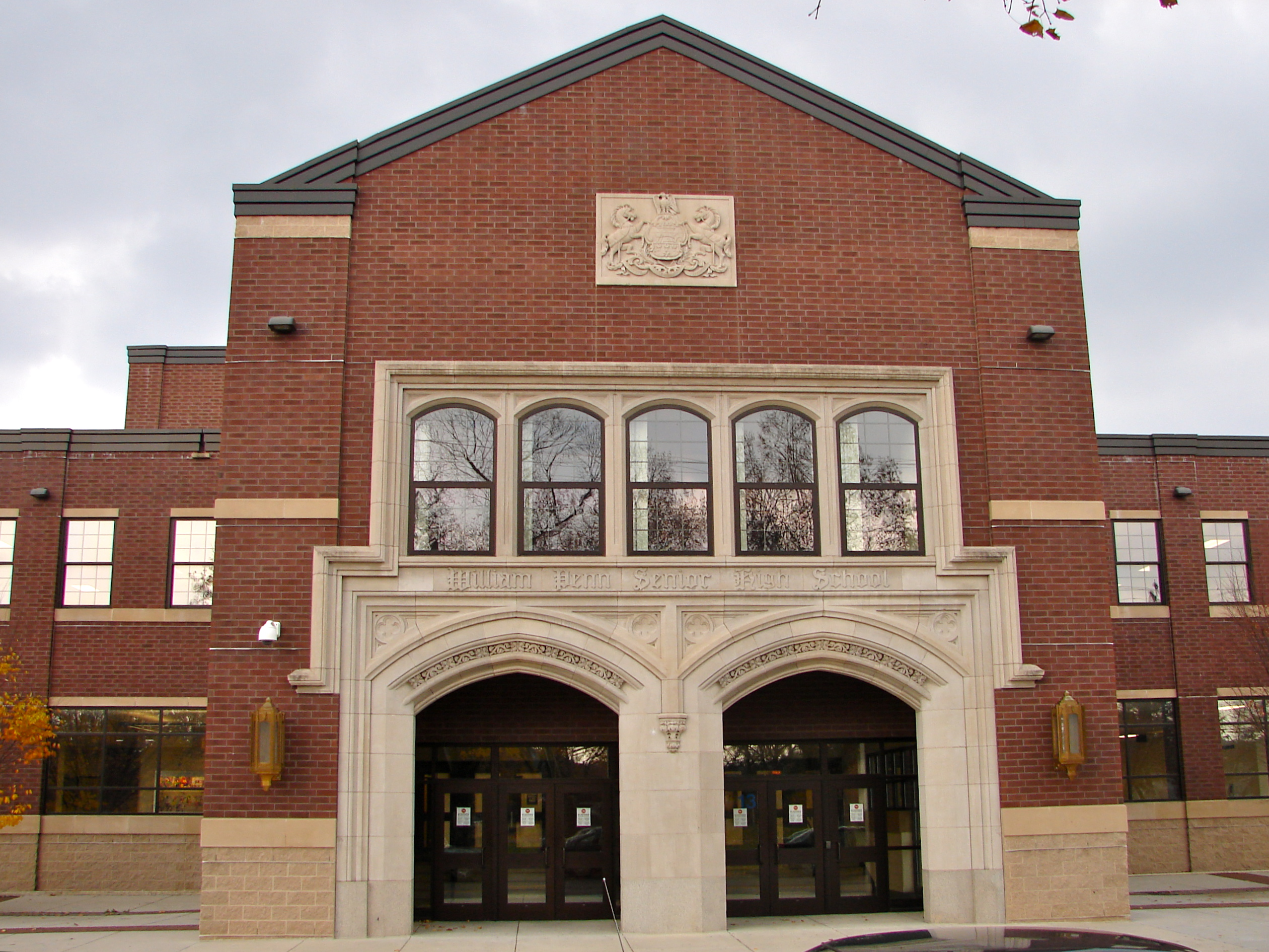
William Penn Senior High School on Penn Commons

York and its surrounding area are served by 15 public school districts, York City and Dallastown, Eastern York, West York, Central York, York Suburban, Southern York County, Red Lion, Northeastern York, Dover, Hanover, South Western, Spring Grove, York County School of Technology, and South Eastern public school districts. Private Christian schools in the area include the Christian School of York, Shrewsbury Christian Academy, Holy Trinity Catholic School, and York Catholic High School.

There are also a number of charter schools in the area. Lincoln Charter School was established in 2000, Helen Thackston Charter School in 2009, and York Academy Regional Charter School in 2011.

The city is home to York College of Pennsylvania, which was founded in 1787 and offers up to master's level education and a doctoral level nursing program. Penn State York offers several baccalaureate degrees, minors, associate degrees and one master's degree. Penn State students may utilize a "2+2" program, allowing them to complete the first two years of study at the York campus and the last two at Penn State University Park.

Other higher education organizations in York are Harrisburg Area Community College's York Campus, the YTI Career Institute (YTI), which offers accredited degree and diploma programs in the business, healthcare and culinary fields and the York Time Institute, which offers diplomas in clock repair and restoration. The city formerly housed the Art Institute of York-Pennsylvania, previously known as the Bradley Academy for the Visual Arts, until its closure in 2017, as well as the Yorktowne Business Institute (YBI) & School of Culinary Arts.

== Media ==
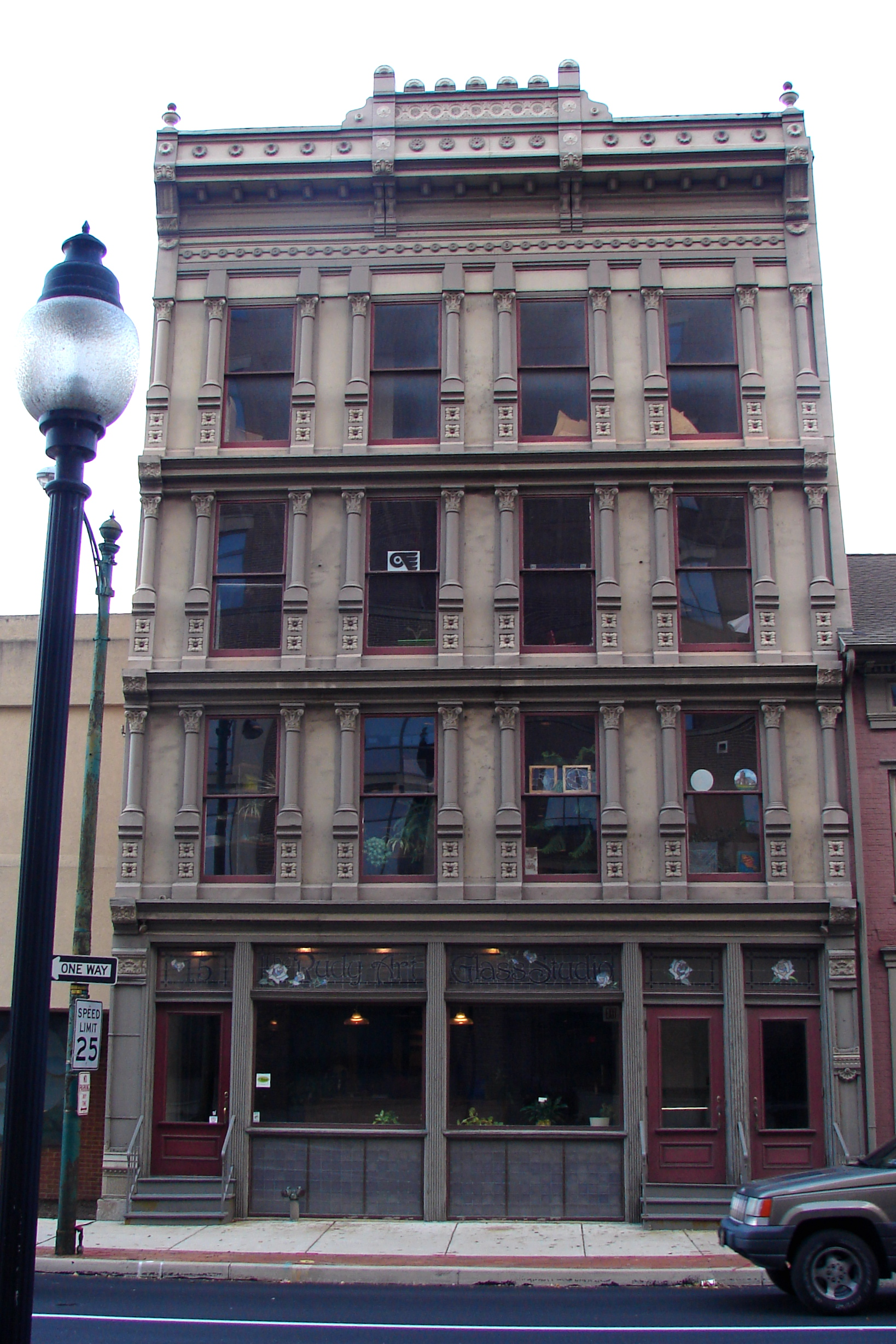
The old York Dispatch building

York is unusual in that it supports two daily newspapers, despite its relatively small size. The York Daily Record/Sunday News is published mornings, seven days a week, and The York Dispatch is published Monday through Friday mornings. The Dispatch was an afternoon paper until 2014. The Daily Record/Sunday News currently has the lead in terms of circulations of the daily newspapers.

York is part of the Susquehanna Valley (Harrisburg/Lancaster/Lebanon/York) media market. The Fox affiliate WPMT 43, has its base of operations in York.

York has a Public, educational, and government access (PEG) cable TV station called WRCT (White Rose Community Television) wrct.TV which used to be YCAT (York Community Access Television).

The pop music radio station, WSBA AM 910, achieved high ratings in York, and nearby Harrisburg and Lancaster, during the 1960s and 1970s. WSBA, now a news-talk station, was the flagship station of Susquehanna Broadcasting, which had its corporate offices in York.

Other radio stations in York include WVYC from York College, WARM FM, WQXA FM, and WOYK.

FM stations licensed to York include:

Callsign	MHz	Details
WSOX	96.1	Oldies
WYCR	98.5	98.5 The Peak
WVYC	99.7	Indie/College Rock, York College
WARM	103.3	"Warm 103" Adult Contemporary
WQXA	105.7	"105.7 The X" Active Rock

== Infrastructure ==
=== Fire department and public safety ===
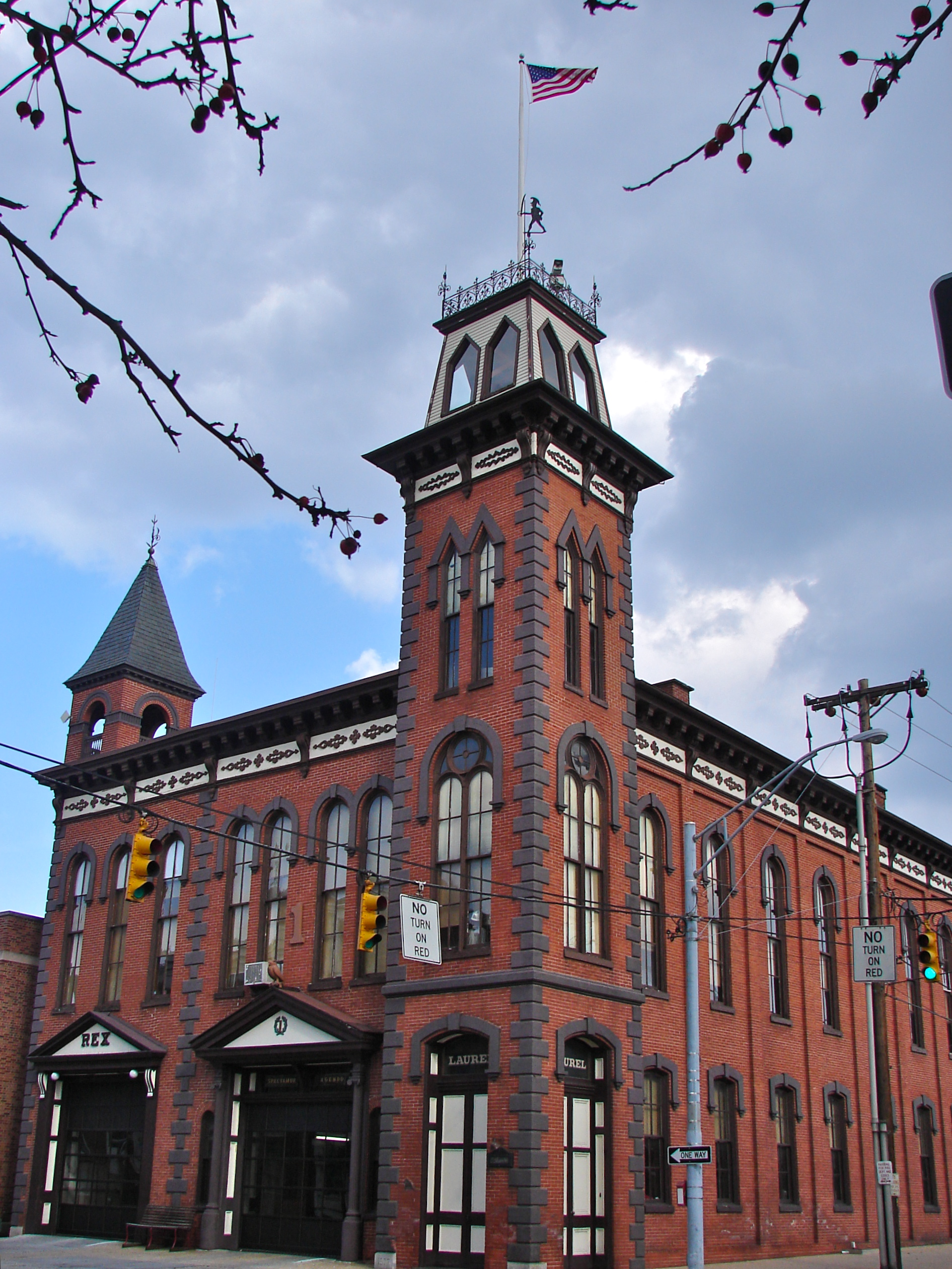
York Fire Station No. 1 on South Duke Street and East King Street

York is served by the York City Fire Department (Company 99), which operates out of four fire stations, located throughout the city, and maintains a fire apparatus fleet of six engines, two trucks, one service, and other support units. The YFD staffs three engines, one truck and one duty Chief twenty-hours per day, and responds to approximately 2,700 emergency calls annually.

The city and surrounding area are also served by York Area United Fire and Rescue (Company 89), First Capital EMS (Company 5), UPMC LifeTeam EMS (Company 2), York City Police, York County Area Regional Police, Spring Garden Township Police, as well as other police departments, ambulance stations, and fire companies.

=== Transportation ===
==== Bus service ====
York is served, through public transportation, by Rabbit Transit, which operates multiple bus routes in the city and the surrounding suburbs. In 2006, a Rabbit EXPRESS bus route was established to transport commuters to Harrisburg and back, making six round trips weekdays. Rabbit Transit introduced a new route on February 2, 2009, that provides three daily round trips between York and Timonium, Maryland. The $5 fare each way covers 80% of the operating costs.

In addition to Rabbit Transit, the city has a Greyhound/Trailways bus depot with service to Harrisburg and Syracuse, New York, or to Baltimore and Washington, D.C. provided by Greyhound Lines. Bieber Transportation Group formerly provided service to New York City along a route running by way of Lancaster, Reading, and Philadelphia and a route running by way of Lancaster, Reading, and the Lehigh Valley until service was discontinued in April 2018.

Intercity bus service to New York City was restored by OurBus on July 1, 2018.

==== Rail ====
Lancaster, twenty-four miles to the east, has frequent Amtrak train service to Philadelphia.

As recent as the late 1960s, the station was the site of several train departures a day, run by the Pennsylvania Railroad heading north to Harrisburg and south, towards Baltimore and Washington, DC, including the Buffalo Day Express, the Northern Express, the Spirit of St. Louis and shuttle cars for the Penn Texas.

The last Red Arrow bound for Detroit departed from York during the latter half of the 1950s. Rail advocates have suggested commuter rail service could be started between York and Philadelphia, with much of the necessary infrastructure already in place, using SEPTA's system. Transportation planners say this is too expensive, with bus and van services more feasible. The former Pennsylvania Railroad station for York now lies along the York County Heritage Rail Trail across from WellSpan Park.

==== Major highways ====
- U.S. Route 30
- Interstate 83

==== Airports ====
York does not have any commercial airports, though the small York Airport (THV) is located seven miles southwest in Thomasville. The nearest major airports are Baltimore-Washington International (BWI) and Harrisburg International Airport (MDT).

In addition, Washington Dulles Airport (IAD) and Philadelphia International Airport (PHL) are both located approximately 110 miles (177 km) to the south west and east of York, respectively.

=== Healthcare ===
York City has two hospitals; WellSpan York Hospital and UPMC Memorial Hospital.

Founded in 1880, WellSpan York Hospital is located on the edge of York City on the border of Spring Garden Township and is a regional specialty center, featuring a level 1 trauma center, a stroke center, and level 3 NICU. The hospital employs more than 5,000 people, is a nationally recognized teaching hospital, and can treat a large variety of patients with diverse issues, including pediatrics, orthopedics, and cardiac issues.

Memorial Hospital was opened in 1945, and was taken over by PinnacleHealth in 2017. PinnacleHealth became part of the UPMC health system in 2017, and Memorial Hospital then became UPMC Memorial. In 2019, UPMC Memorial moved from its old facility in Spring Garden Township to its new facility in West Manchester Township. UPMC Memorial is a general hospital, and features a Select Specialty facility. The old Memorial Hospital is undergoing conversion into an apartment building, as of March 2023.

York has many independent healthcare facilities as well as those run by other corporations, however WellSpan and UPMC are the primary health systems in York and the surrounding area and have the majority of local specialty centers and doctors offices.

== Notable people ==
- List of people from York, Pennsylvania

== Sister cities ==
York is twinned with:

- Arles, France (since 1954)
- Leinfelden-Echterdingen, Germany (since 1981)

Preceded by Lancaster, Pennsylvania	Capital of the United States of America; 1777–1778	Succeeded by Philadelphia, Pennsylvania
