= York City School District =

School district in Pennsylvania

Coordinates: 39.96230°N 76.73159°W

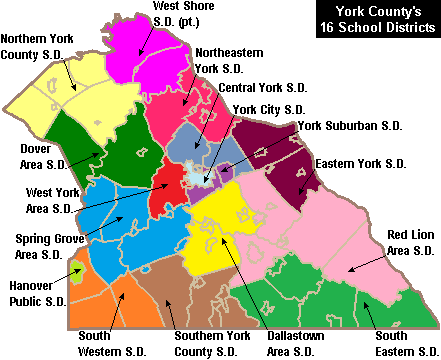

Address
- 31 North Pershing Avenue York, York County, Pennsylvania, 17401; United States

District information
- Type: Public
- Motto: "Failure is not an option"

Students and staff
- Colors: Blue and orange

Other information
- Website: ycs.k12.pa.us

The York City School District is a large, urban, public school district serving the City of York, Pennsylvania in York County, Pennsylvania. The district encompasses approximately 5 square miles (13 km^{2}). According to 2010 census data, the district's population was 43,718 people, estimated to be 44,118 as of 2018. As of 2018, the district's population were 69.25% high school graduates and 15.38% college graduates.

As of 2018, the median household income in the district is approximately $30,283, while the median family income is approximately $33,048. In the Commonwealth, the median family income was $49,501 and the United States median family income was $49,445, in 2010. According to the Pennsylvania Budget and Policy Center, 81.1% of the district's pupils lived at 185% or below the federal poverty level as shown by their eligibility for the federal free or reduced-price school meal programs in 2012.

== Schools ==
- William Penn Senior High School (York High), 9th–12th
- McKinley School, K-8th
- Edgar Fahs Smith STEAM Academy, 3rd–12th
- Jackson School, K-8th
- Phineas Davis School, K-8th
- Hannah Penn School, K-8th
- A.D. Goode School, K-8th
- Ferguson School, K-8th
- Devers School, K-8th
- William C. Goodridge Academy, 8th–12th
- Bearcat Cyber Academy

Students from 8th-9th grade may choose to apply for York County School of Technology for training in Dental Assisting, Construction Trades, Automotive Technology, Criminal Justice, Cosmetology and more. Lincoln Intermediate Unit 12 provides the district with a wide variety of services, including specialized education for disabled students, and hearing as well as speech and visual disability services and professional development for staff and faculty.

Per the 2012–2013 budget cuts and to deal with a decline in enrollment of 1,000 since 2006, alignment changes were instituted. All elementary schools became grades preschool and K-8. Edgar Fahs Smith Middle School (6–8) and Hannah Penn Middle School were closed. As of 2020, Edgar Fahs Smith Middle School was reopened as Edgar Fahs Smith STEAM Academy, serving grades 3rd through 12th, and Hannah Penn Middle School was reopened as Hannah Penn K-8.

== Extracurriculars ==
The district's students have access to a wide variety of clubs and activities, and an extensive sports program.

=== Sports ===
The district funds:

Varsity

Boys

- Basketball – AAAA
- Football – AAAA
- Indoor track and field – AA
- Swimming and diving – AAA
- Track and field – AAA

Girls

- Basketball – AAAA
- Cheerleading – AAAA
- Indoor track and field – AAAA
- Swimming and diving – AAA
- Track and field – AAA
- Volleyball – AAA
