= George Margetas =

American politician

Member of the Pennsylvania House of Representatives from the 196th district
- Incumbent
- Assumed office June 9, 2026
- Preceded by: Seth Grove

Personal details
- Born: c. 1979
- Party: Republican
- Education: Dickinson College
- Alma mater: West York Area High School

George H. Margetas (c. 1979) is an American politician who is currently the representative for the 196th district in the Pennsylvania House of Representatives. A member of the Republican Party, he won a special election in 2026.

== Early life and education ==
Margetas was born circa 1979 and resided in York County, Pennsylvania his whole life. He graduated from West York Area High School in 1996 and Dickinson College in 2000.

== Political career ==
Margetas served on the school board of the West York Area School District and on the Republican committees of York County and the state of Pennsylvania. He was also a supervisor in West Manchester Township. In 2026, State Representative Seth Grove resigned, vacating the 196th district seat. Margetas was the Republican candidate to replace Grove, facing off against Democratic candidate Ron Ruman, the vice chair of the West Manchester Township Board of Supervisors. He defeated Ruman in the May special election. The special election coincided with the regularly scheduled primary elections where Margetas and Ruman were chosen to faceoff again in the general election. He was sworn in on June 9, 2026.

== Political positions ==
Margetas opposes allowing transgender student athletes to compete on the gendered sports teams of their gender identity. He supports expanding fracking. Margetas supported a partnership between township police and ICE that was withdrawn before a vote was taken.

Upon being elected to the state House, Margetas pledge to be a fiscal watchdog. He supports increasing sales tax to make up for a reduction in property tax. Margetas supports school choice and the funding of school vouchers. He supports term limits for legislators.

Margetas supports leaving the issue of data center permittance to local municipalities. As a supervisor, he voted to rezone land in West Manchester Township for a data center.
