= Beverly Mackereth =

American politician

Secretary of the Pennsylvania Department of Public Welfare
- In office February 15, 2013 – January 20, 2015; Acting until June 25, 2013
- Governor: Tom Corbett
- Preceded by: Gary Alexander
- Succeeded by: Ted Dallas

Member of the Pennsylvania House of Representatives from the 196th district
- In office January 2, 2001 – November 30, 2008
- Preceded by: Todd Platts
- Succeeded by: Seth Grove

Personal details
- Born: January 27, 1958 (age 68) Washington, DC, U.S.
- Party: Republican
- Spouse: Michael
- Education: Frostburg State University (B.S.)
- Alma mater: Montgomery Blair High School

Beverly D. Mackereth (born January 27, 1958) is an American politician who formerly represented the 196th District in the Pennsylvania House of Representatives from 2001 to 2008. A Republican, Mackereth served as secretary of the Pennsylvania Department of Public Welfare from 2013 to 2015.

== Early life and education ==
Mackereth was born on January 27, 1958, in Washington, D.C.. She graduated from Montgomery Blair High School in 1975 and earned a Bachelor of Science degree in psychology and sociology from Frostburg State University in 1979.

== Career ==
In 1980, Mackereth became a caseworker for York County, Pennsylvania's Children and Youth Services, becoming a supervisor by 1987.

From 1994 to 1995, Mackereth served on the borough council of Spring Grove, Pennsylvania. She was elected mayor of the borough in 1996 and served until 2000.

In 2000, Mackereth was elected to represent the 196th District in the Pennsylvania House of Representatives. She was continuously re-elected until her retirement in 2008 when she announced her appointment as York County's human services director.

Mackereth served as Deputy Pennsylvania Secretary of Public Welfare for the Office of Children, Youth and Families from 2011 until 2013, when Governor Tom Corbett appointed Mackereth acting secretary of public welfare, following the resignation of Gary Alexander on February 15, 2013. She was confirmed by the State Senate as full secretary on June 25. Her term ended on January 20, 2015.

Following the 2022 Pennsylvania gubernatorial election, Mackereth served in the transition team of Democratic governor-elect Josh Shapiro, who Mackereth endorsed in the general election over far-right Republican nominee Doug Mastriano. She served on the Human Services Subcommittee of Shapiro's transition team.

In 2024, Mackereth was hired by Lackawanna County as a consultant charged with reviewing the policies of the county's Office of Youth and Family Services after the state government downgraded the agency's rating following the arrest of several caseworkers on charges of child endangerment.
