= Teresa Miller =

Teresa Miller may refer to:

- Teresa Miller (lawyer), current Insurance Commissioner of Pennsylvania
- Teresa Miller (academic), American professor, author, legal scholar, and educator
- Teresa Miller (writer), American writer, television host, and literary activist
- Teresa K. Miller, American poet
