= Rebecca J. Cole =

Rebecca J. Cole may refer to:

- Rebecca Cole (physician), African-American doctor
- Rebecca Cole (basketball), Australian basketball player
