= Seth Grove =

American politician

Member of the Pennsylvania House of Representatives from the 196th district
- In office January 6, 2009 – January 31, 2026
- Preceded by: Beverly Mackereth
- Succeeded by: George Margetas

Personal details
- Born: September 14, 1979 (age 46) York, Pennsylvania, U.S.
- Party: Republican

Seth Grove (born September 14, 1979) is a former Republican member of the Pennsylvania House of Representatives, representing district 196 from 2009 to 2026.

== Politics ==
Prior to his election, Grove served as a legislative assistant for Congressman Todd Platts and Representative Stan Saylor, and as a chief of staff for Representative Keith J. Gillespie. He has been a representative in the Pennsylvania House of Representatives since 2009.

In 2021, Grove authored a bill to overhaul Pennsylvania's elections.

Grove resigned from the Pennsylvania House in January 2026.

== Personal ==
Grove attended York College and graduated with a degree in public administration. He and his wife live in Dover.
