= Pennsylvania House of Representatives, District 196 =

American legislative district

Pennsylvania's 196th State House of Representatives district
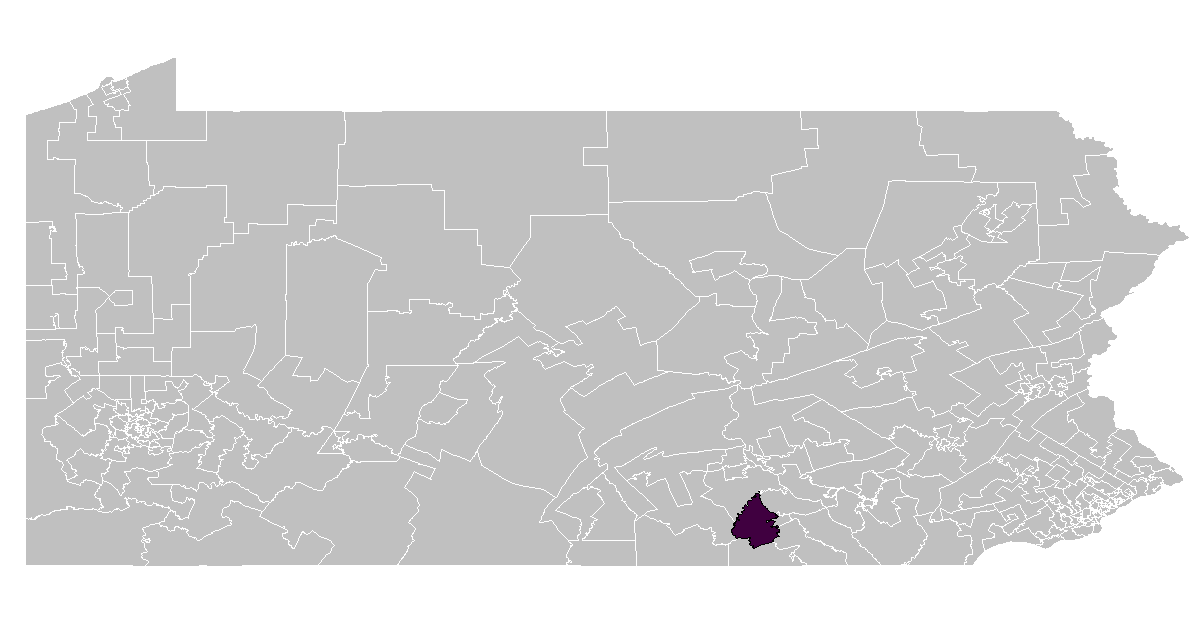
Representative
George Margetas; R–West Manchester Township

Pennsylvania's 196th Representative District is located in York County and includes the following areas:

- Dover
- Dover Township
- Jackson Township
- New Salem
- North Codorus Township
- Paradise Township
- Spring Grove
- West Manchester Township (PART, Districts 02, 03, 04 and 05)

== Representatives ==
Representative	Party	Years	District home	Note
Prior to 1969, seats were apportioned by county.
Mitchell W. Melton	Democrat	1969–1972		
Charles P. Hammock	Democrat	1973–1976		
Ruth B. Harper	Democrat	1977–1992		
District moved from Philadelphia County to York County after 1992
Todd R. Platts	Republican	1993–2000		Elected to Pennsylvania's 19th congressional district
Beverly Mackereth	Republican	2001–2008		Did not seek re-election
Seth Grove	Republican	2009–2026		Resigned
George Margetas	Republican	2026–present		Elected to fill vacancy
