= Henry L. Phillips =

American social reformer and Episcopal priest (1847–1947)

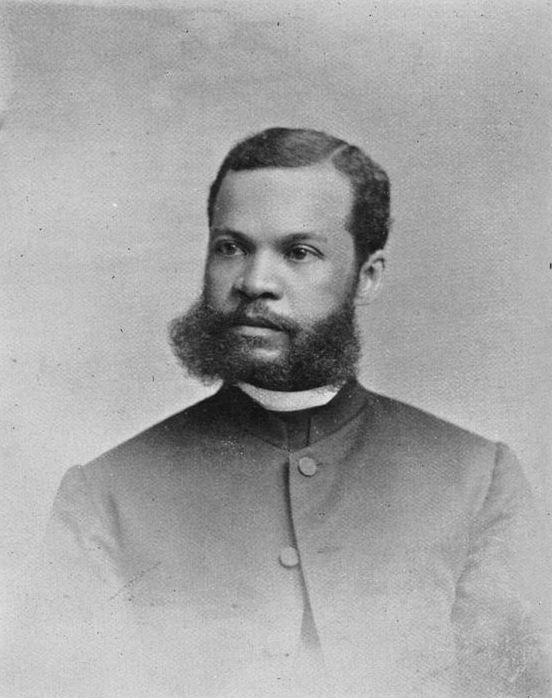
- Phillips circa 1897
- Born: Henry Laird Phillips; March 11, 1847; Saint Elizabeth Parish, Jamaica
- Died: May 27, 1947 (aged 100); Philadelphia, U.S.
- Education: Lincoln University (Pennsylvania); Philadelphia Divinity School
- Occupations: Priest, social reformer
- Employer: Episcopal Diocese of Pennsylvania

Henry Laird Phillips (March 11, 1847 – May 27, 1947) was an American social reformer and rector of the Church of the Crucifixion, an African American Episcopal Church congregation in Philadelphia. The Pennsylvania Historical and Museum Commission erected a commemorative marker outside the church in 1993. W. E. B. Du Bois praised Phillips as "one of the most valuable social reformers of the day."

== Early life and education ==
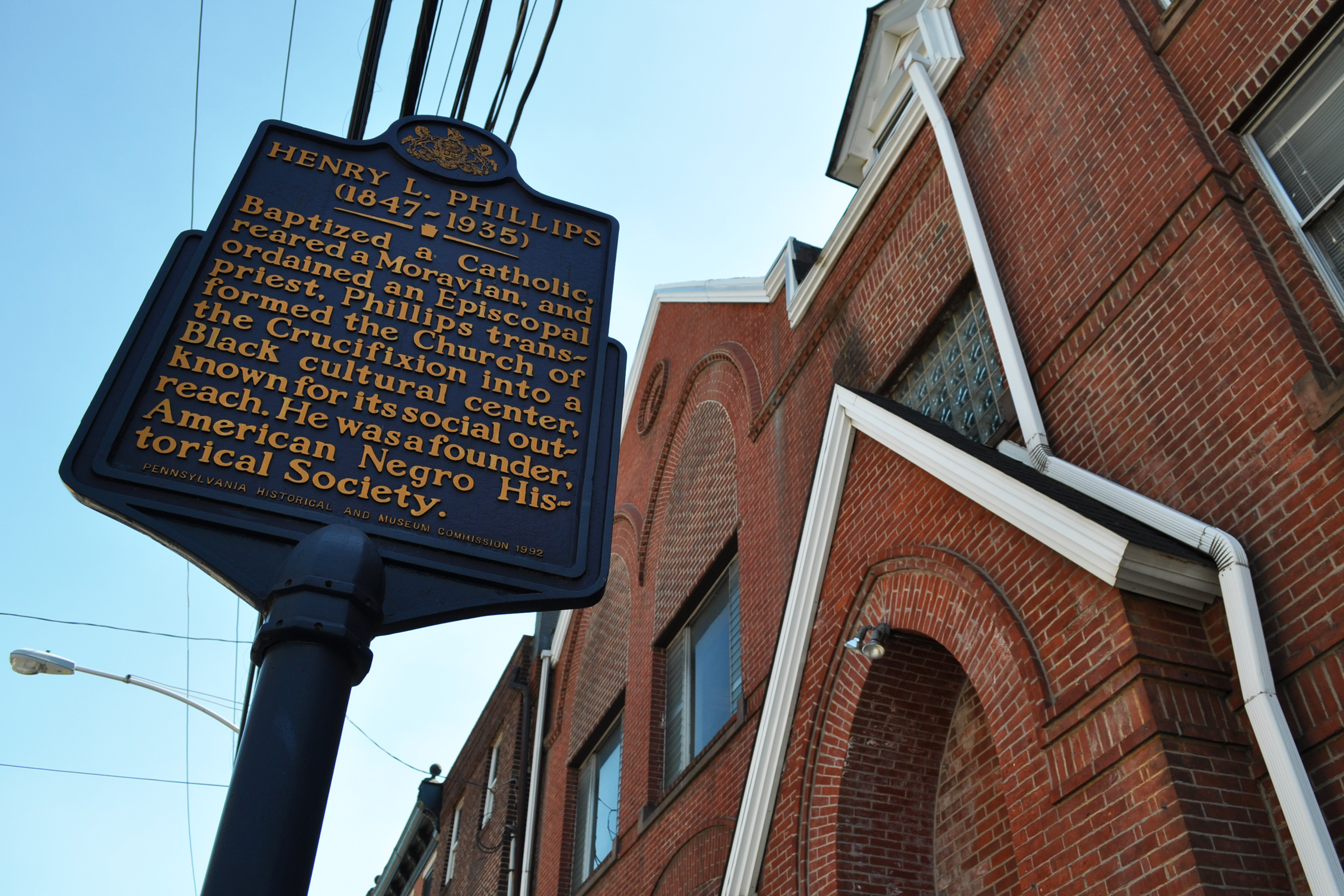
Henry L. Phillips Historical Marker, 620 South 8th Street, Philadelphia

Phillips was born in Saint Elizabeth Parish, Jamaica, on March 11, 1847. At the age of 21, he left Jamaica to teach on the island of Saint Croix in the former Danish West Indies. He moved to the United States in 1870 and became a lay reader at St. Philip's Episcopal Church in Manhattan before enrolling in the Philadelphia Divinity School in 1872. Baptized as a Roman Catholic and raised and confirmed as a Moravian, Phillips was ordained to the priesthood in the Episcopal Church in 1875 by Bishop William Bacon Stevens.

== Clerical service ==
Soon after ordination, Phillips served as interim rector of the African Episcopal Church of St. Thomas. After six months at St. Thomas, he became rector of the Church of the Crucifixion. Founded in 1847 as only the second predominantly Black church in the Episcopal Diocese of Pennsylvania, the church counted W. E. B. Du Bois and other Black luminaries among its congregants. A new church and mission were constructed on the northwestern corner of Bainbridge Street and South 8th Street, with the cornerstone laid in 1883.

Phillips organized numerous social welfare programs to support poor parishioners, homeless people, and prisoners. He established the nation's first penny savings bank for African Americans, expanded the Home for the Homeless (Philadelphia's only shelter for needy women and children of all races), and started the city's first gym for African Americans (later the Christian Street YMCA). He also organized numerous social activities, including singing societies, youth clubs, lecture courses, and early childhood education at the parish house. By the time of his retirement as rector, he had raised $25,000 to strengthen the church's endowment. He helped convene the Church League for Colored Work in the Episcopal Diocese of Pennsylvania in 1897, and when the league dissolved in 1912, Phillips was appointed Archdeacon for Colored Work for the diocese. He also served the ninth rector of St. Thomas from 1912 to 1914.

Phillips retired in 1932 after more than fifty years of service.

== Civic organizations ==
Phillips was the only Black member of Philadelphia's Vice Commission, where he advocated for harsher criminal penalties, including forced labor for pickpockets and gamblers and flogging for procurers. He spoke against anti-Black lynching and urged African Americans to defend themselves if attacked by white rioters.

In 1905, Phillips became the first president of the Association for the Protection of Colored Women (APCW), which sought to protect Black women, especially ones who had recently emigrated from the South, from being trafficked into prostitution. According to historian Khalil Gibran Muhammad, "the APCW was effectively the first and only black-run crime prevention agency in Philadelphia." Muhammad criticizes Phillips' rhetoric about the class status of Black Southern migrants, whom Northern Black elites generally regarded as cruder and more criminally disposed.

Phillips served as board secretary of the Berean Manual Training and Industrial School. He co-founded the American Negro Historical Society in 1897 and served as the first treasurer of this association dedicated to studying and preserving materials on African American history and culture.

== Honors and recognition ==
The Philadelphia Divinity School awarded Phillips an honorary degree in 1940. He held a Doctor of Divinity degree from Lincoln University.

In 1899, W. E. B. Du Bois described Phillips as "a man of sincerity and culture and of peculiar energy" who demonstrated skill with raising funds and other support for Black charitable causes amid the wealthy white community of Philadelphia. In his famed 1903 report on African American churches, Du Bois recognized Phillips "the Negro priest of longest service in the Episcopal Church" and "one of the most valuable social reformers of the day."

Historian Charles L. Blockson called Phillips "one of the most important African American ministers that Pennsylvania has produced."

== Personal life ==
Circa 1876, Phillips married Sarah “Sallie” Elizabeth Cole, scion of a distinguished Black family whose members attended St. Thomas where he was rector. Cole's sisters included physician Rebecca Cole and school principal Dora Cole. Henry and Sarah Phillips had two sons, Harry and Theodore.

Phillips died at his Philadelphia home on May 27, 1947, at the age of 100. Interment was at Merion Memorial Park in Bala Cynwyd, Pennsylvania.
