= Teresa Miller (lawyer) =

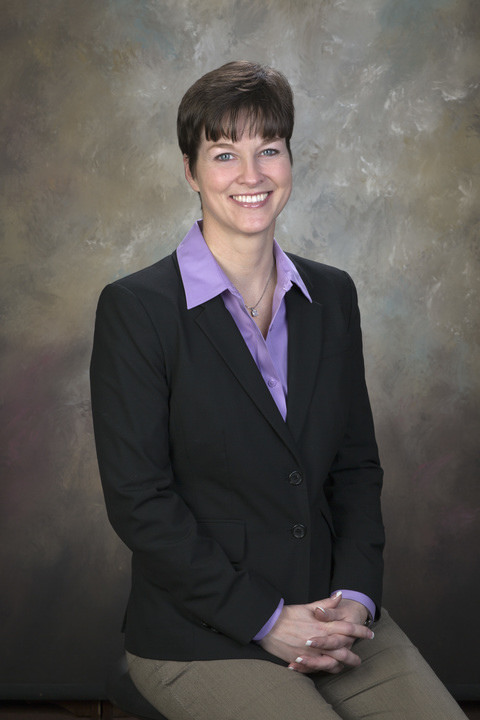

Secretary of Human Services of Pennsylvania
- In office 2017 – April 30, 2021
- Governor: Tom Wolf
- Preceded by: Ted Dallas
- Succeeded by: Meg Snead

Insurance Commissioner of Pennsylvania
- In office June 3, 2015 – August 21, 2017
- Governor: Tom Wolf
- Preceded by: Michael F. Consedine
- Succeeded by: Jessica Altman

Personal details
- Education: Pacific Lutheran University; Willamette University College of Law

Teresa Miller is the president and chief executive officer of the Kansas Health Foundation (KHF), and is also a member of the Kansas Governor’s Commission on Racial Equity and Justice.

Previously appointed by Pennsylvania Governor Tom Wolf as the Insurance Commissioner of Pennsylvania, effective June 2015, she was then appointed by Wolf as Secretary of Human Services in 2017 to direct the operations of the Pennsylvania Department of Human Services.

Prior to taking office in Pennsylvania, she served as administrator of the Oregon Insurance Division. She is a member of the National Association of Insurance Commissioners (NAIC).

== Formative years ==
Born in Oregon, Miller received her Bachelor of Arts degree (magna cum laude) from Pacific Lutheran University and her Juris Doctor from Willamette University.

== Career ==
Miller was appointed as the administrator of the Oregon Insurance Division. She then worked for the Centers for Medicare and Medicaid Services, at the U.S. Department of Health and Human Services before becoming a partner at the law firm of Crowell & Moring.

In 2015, she was nominated to be the Insurance Commissioner of Pennsylvania by Pennsylvania Governor Tom Wolf and was confirmed in June of that year. During her tenure, she oversaw public hearings regarding the "Surprise Balance Billing of Health Insurance Consumers" (2015) and the state of long-term care insurance, and provided guidance to consumers and insurance industry personnel regarding state laws related to insurance policy pricing.

Appointed by Wolf as Secretary of the Pennsylvania Department of Human Services in 2017, Miller announced her departure from the administration, effective April 30, 2021.

In May 2021, Miller took over as president and chief executive officer of the Kansas Health Foundation (KHF). She was then also appointed to the Governor’s Commission on Racial Equity and Justice by Kansas Governor Laura Kelly.
