= Caroline Still Anderson =

American physician (1848–1919)

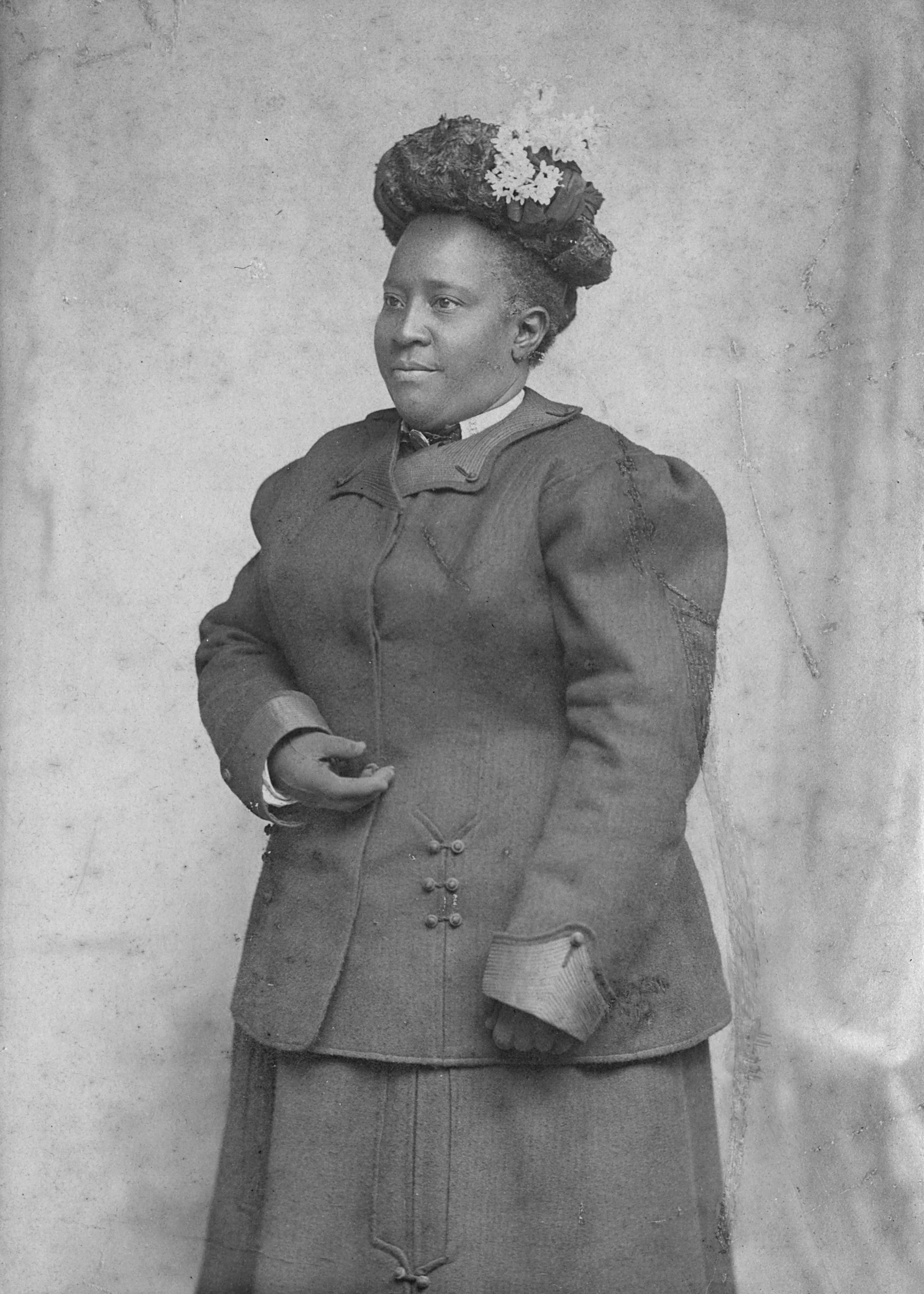
- Portrait by Frederick Gutekunst, c. 1890
- Born: Caroline Virginia Still; November 1, 1848; Philadelphia, Pennsylvania, U.S.
- Died: June 1, 1919 (aged 70); Philadelphia, Pennsylvania, U.S.
- Occupations: Physician; educator; activist
- Known for: One of the first African-American women to become a physician in the United States

Caroline Still Anderson (November 1, 1848 – June 1 or 2, 1919) was an American physician, educator, and activist. She was a pioneering physician in the Philadelphia African-American community and one of the first Black women to become a physician in the United States.

== Early life and education ==
Caroline Still Anderson was born November 1, 1848, and was the oldest daughter of four to Letitia and William Still. Both of her parents were leaders in the American abolitionist movement. Her father led the Philadelphia branch of the Underground Railroad, which began shortly after Still's birth.

As a child, Still attended Mrs. Gordon's Private School, The Friends' Raspberry Alley School, and the Institute for Colored Youth (now Cheyney University of Pennsylvania). Though these schools were expensive, her father's lucrative career in the coal industry allowed him to afford a good education for his daughter.

Still was fortunate to have this opportunity because 19th-century Philadelphia was not welcoming for most black people, but some black families prospered socially and economically. Being a part of this community, Still was protected from the ill-treatment that less fortunate blacks received and was able to take full advantage of her privileges. Still's father valued the importance of education for his daughters and encouraged Still to pursue her education seriously.

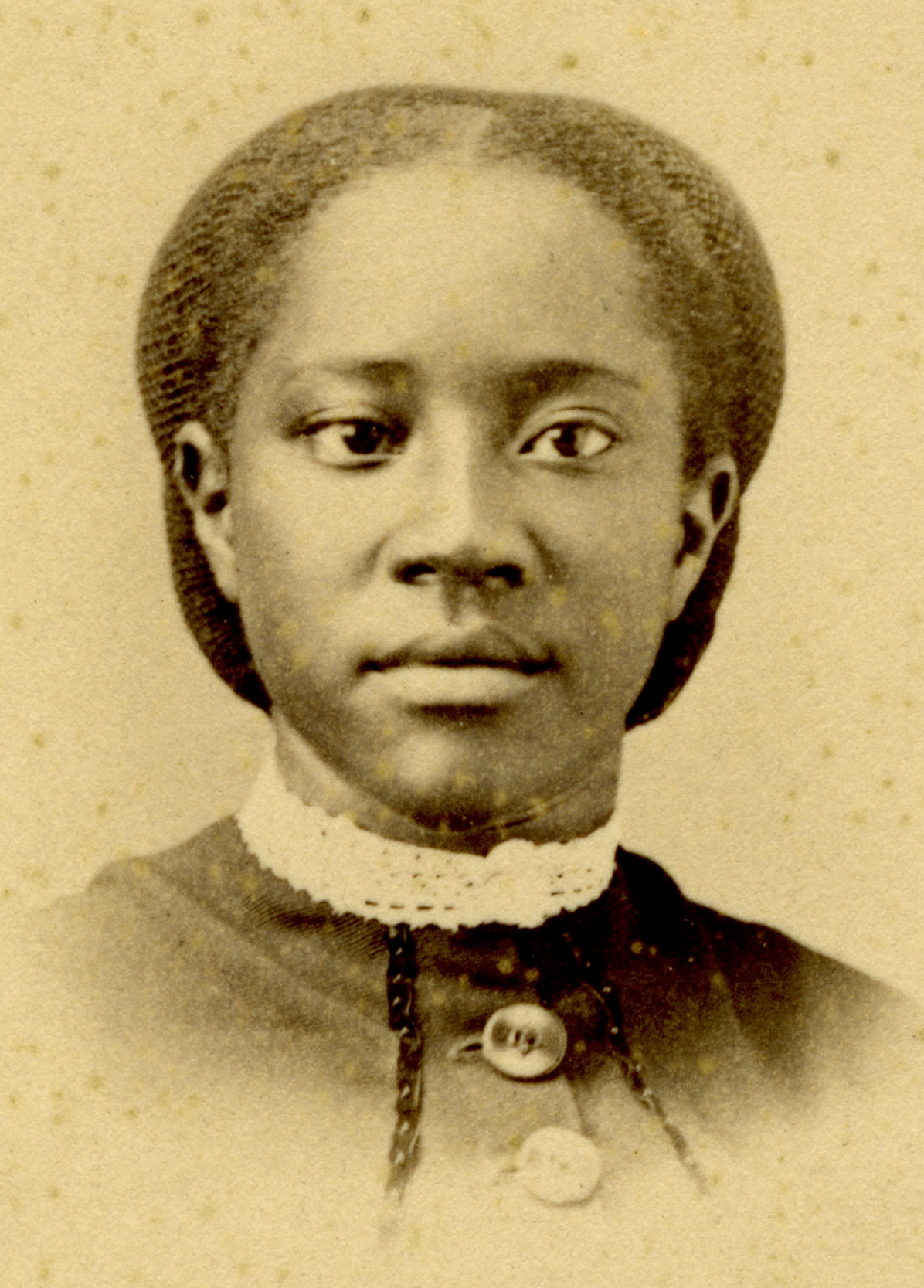
Portrait of Anderson in 1868, while a student at Oberlin College

Still completed her primary and secondary education at the age of 15. In 1864, she matriculated at Oberlin College as the only black student in her class. She earned her degree in 1868 at the age of 19 as the youngest student in her graduating class. After earning her Bachelor of Arts degree, she was elected the first black president of the Ladies' Literary Society of Oberlin.

Still married her first husband, Edward A. Wiley, a fellow Oberlin alumnus and formerly enslaved person, in a ceremony at their home on December 28, 1869. The wedding was attended by many prominent members of the U.S. antislavery movement and included a performance by Elizabeth Taylor Greenfield.

In 1875, two years after her husband's sudden death, Still matriculated at the Howard University College of Medicine, though she earned her Doctor of Medicine degree at the Woman's Medical College of Pennsylvania, where she transferred in 1876 and graduated in 1878. She was one of only two black students in her class of 17. While in school, she worked as a drawing and speech teacher to pay her way.

== Career ==
After graduating from college, Still returned to Philadelphia and worked as a teacher of elocution, drawing, and music until 1875. In 1878, she began her medical career with an internship at Boston's New England Hospital for Women and Children. Still's initial application was rejected by the hospital board due to her race, and she was appointed only after visiting the city and meeting with the board in person. Reportedly awed by her talent, they repudiated their earlier decision, appointing Still to the internship unanimously.

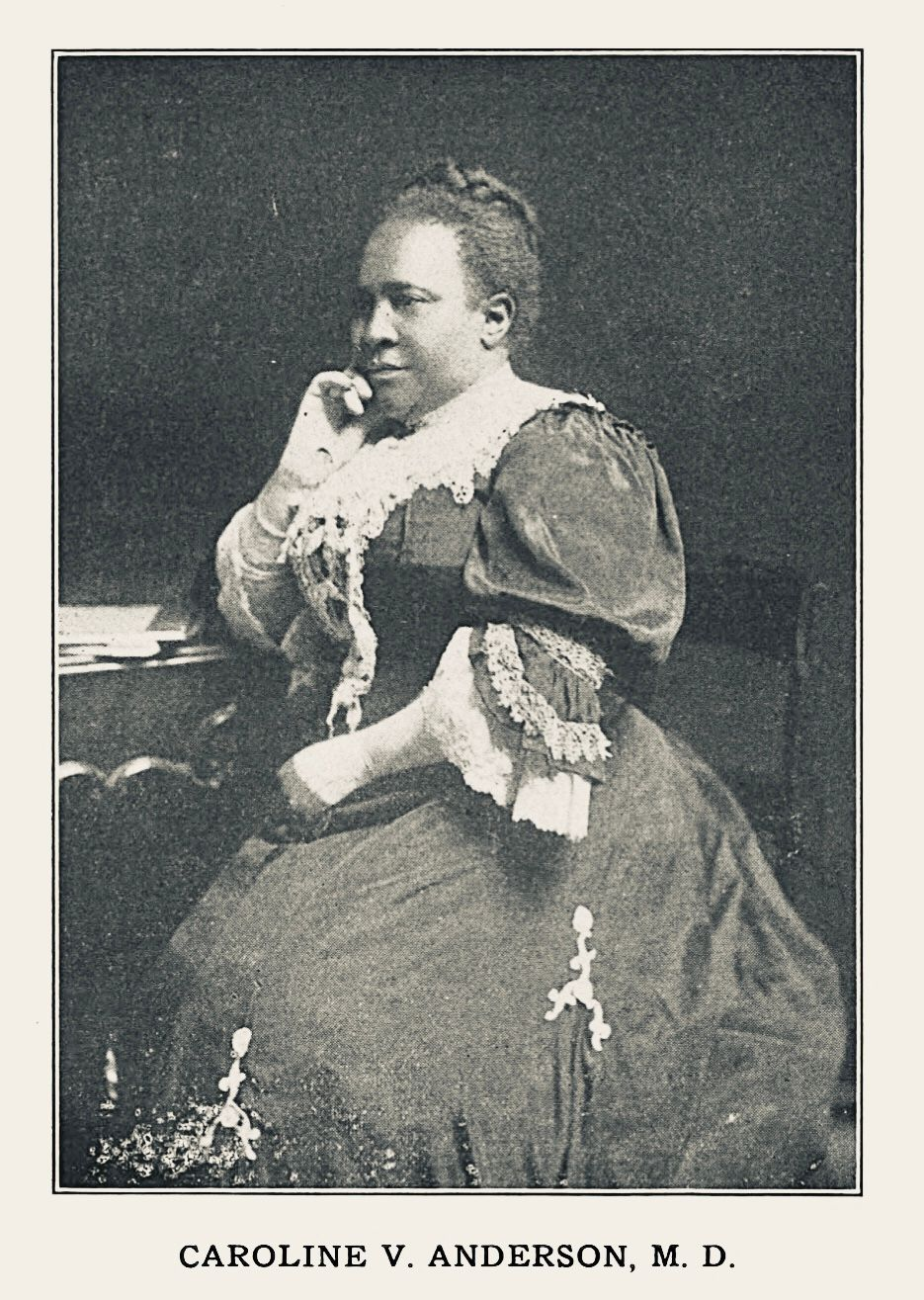
Portrait of Anderson from "Who's Who in Philadelphia" (1912) by Charles Frederick White

After her internship ended in 1879, Still returned to Philadelphia, where she opened a dispensary in her new husband Matthew Anderson's church and opened a private medical practice. Now going by Anderson in 1889, she resumed her career as an educator, teaching hygiene, physiology, and public speaking while continuing her medical practice.

Also in 1889, Still and her husband founded a vocational and liberal arts school called the Berean Manual Training and Industrial School, Anderson was the assistant principal in addition to her teaching roles. She also practiced medicine at Quaker institutions in Philadelphia. Her career came to an end when she suffered a paralytic stroke in 1914.

=== Social activism ===
In her later years, Anderson became a social activist, working with several organizations in the city of Philadelphia for various causes, including temperance and racial equality. She supported the temperance movement as the president of the Berean Woman's Christian Temperance Union, organized Black YMCAs in Philadelphia, and was a board member of the Home for Aged and Infirm Colored People of Philadelphia. Anderson also was a member of the Philadelphia branch of the Women's Medical Society and the treasurer of the Women's Medical College Alumnae Association.

Anderson's work for the black community of Philadelphia was praised by W. E. B. Du Bois, especially her work with the Berean Institute.

== Personal life ==
While studying at Oberlin, Still met Edward Wiley, and they were married in 1869 when she was 21. In their four-year marriage, the couple had two children, Letitia and William. The marriage ended when Wiley died suddenly in 1873. Still married again in 1880 to a minister named Matthew Anderson. Anderson was also an Oberlin alumnus and had also studied at Yale University and Princeton University. The Andersons had five children together, three of whom survived to adulthood: Helen, Maude, and Margaret. Anderson died on June 1 or 2, 1919, in Philadelphia of complications from her strokes. She was 70 years old. Multiple dates are given for her death.
