= Charles Hammock =

American politician (1941–2014)

Charles P. Hammock

Member of the Pennsylvania House of Representatives from the 196th district
- In office January 2, 1973 – November 30, 1976
- Preceded by: Mitchell Melton
- Succeeded by: Ruth Harper

Personal details
- Born: August 24, 1941 Philadelphia, Pennsylvania
- Died: February 15, 2014 (aged 72) Philadelphia, Pennsylvania
- Party: Democratic

Charles Paul Hammock (August 24, 1941 – February 15, 2014) was a former Democratic member of the Pennsylvania House of Representatives.

== Biography ==
Hammock graduated from Roman Catholic High School in Philadelphia, Pennsylvania. He then received his bachelor's degree in economics from Villanova University.

He served as a Democratic member of the Pennsylvania House of Representatives from 1973 to 1976.

Hammock was active in the Black Catholic Movement and served for a time as president of the board of directors for the National Office for Black Catholics. He was one of five African-American Catholics to take their grievances against US Catholic racism to the Vatican in a bid to meet with Pope Paul VI. Their efforts were ultimately unsuccessful.

Hammock died on February 15, 2014.
