= Shiloh, York County, Pennsylvania =

Unincorporated place in Pennsylvania, US

Shiloh
- Census-designated place
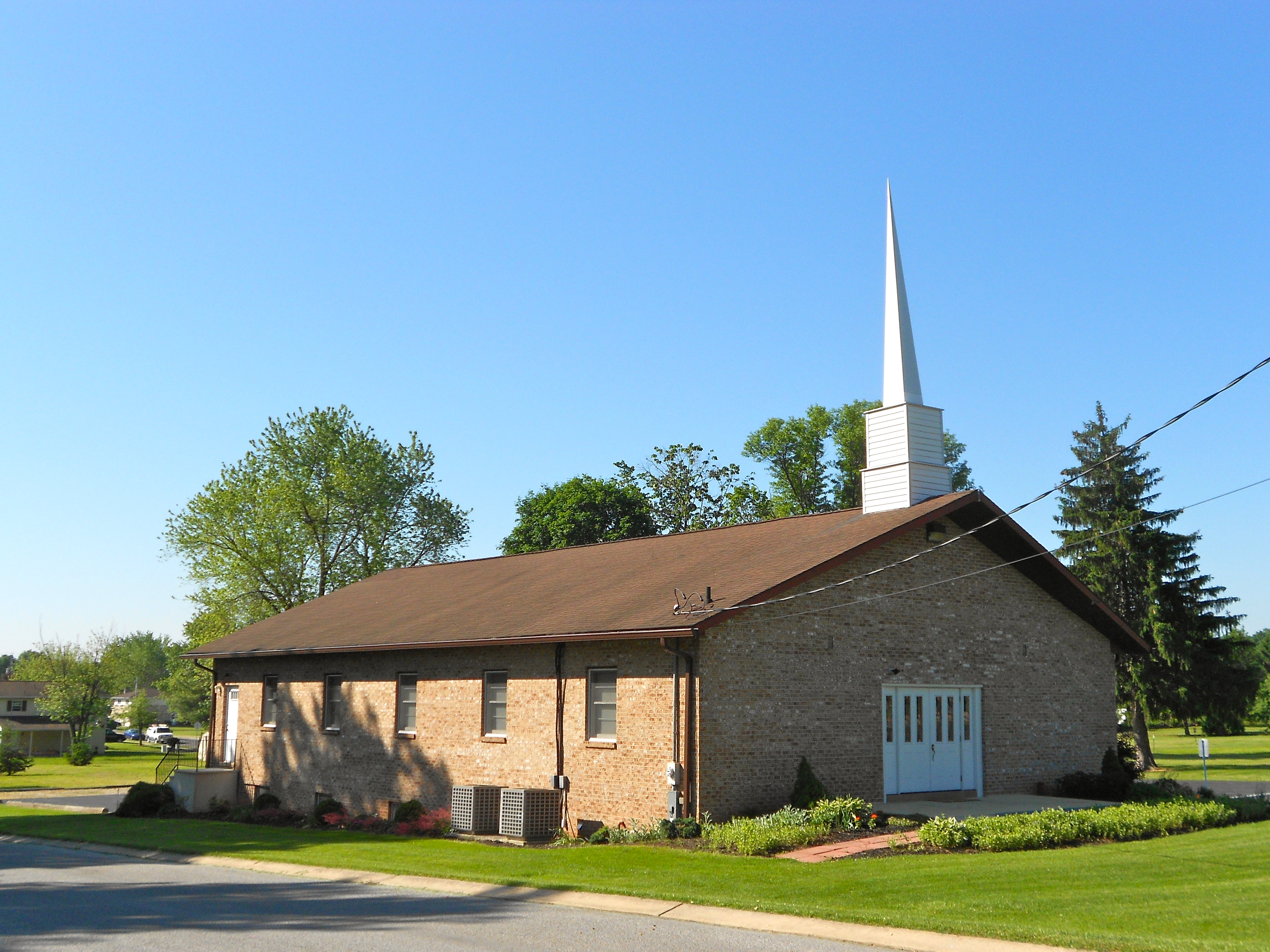
- God's Missionary Church in Shiloh

- Location in York County and the state of Pennsylvania.
- Coordinates: 39°58′22″N 76°47′44″W
- Country: United States
- State: Pennsylvania
- County: York
- Township: West Manchester

Area
  - Total: 4.2 sq mi (10.9 km^{2})
  - Land: 4.2 sq mi (10.9 km^{2})

Population (2010)
  - Total: 11,218
  - Density: 2,670/sq mi (1,030/km^{2})
- Time zone: UTC-5 (Eastern (EST))
  - Summer (DST): UTC-4 (EDT)

Shiloh is a census-designated place (CDP) in West Manchester Township, Pennsylvania, United States. The population was 11,218 at the 2010 census.

Its most visible landmark is the Shiloh Evangelical Lutheran Church.

== Geography ==
According to the United States Census Bureau, the CDP has a total area of 4.2 square miles (10.9 km^{2}), all land.

== Demographics ==
As of the 2000 census, 10,192 people, 4,143 households, and 2,796 families lived in the CDP. The population density was 2,422.6 inhabitants per square mile (935.4/km^{2}). There were 4,262 housing units at an average density of 1,013.0 per square mile (391.1/km^{2}). The racial makeup of the CDP was 95.39% White, 1.71% African American, 0.08% Native American, 1.48% Asian, 0.30% from other races, and 1.04% from two or more races. Hispanic or Latino of any race were 1.06% of the population.

There were 4,143 households, out of which 27.7% had children under the age of 18 living with them, 58.0% were married couples living together, 6.9% had a female householder with no husband present, and 32.5% were non-families. 27.3% of all households were made up of individuals, and 14.3% had someone living alone who was 65 years of age or older. The average household size was 2.34 and the average family size was 2.86.

In the CDP, the population was spread out, with 20.7% under the age of 18, 5.6% from 18 to 24, 26.8% from 25 to 44, 25.1% from 45 to 64, and 21.8% who were 65 years of age or older. The median age was 43 years. For every 100 females, there were 87.5 males. For every 100 females age 18 and over, there were 83.0 males.

The median income for a household in the CDP was $49,023, and the median income for a family was $55,918. Males had a median income of $41,444 versus $25,164 for females. The per capita income for the CDP was $23,625. About 2.7% of families and 4.6% of the population were below the poverty line, including 3.1% of those under the age of 18 and 6.8% ages 65 or older.

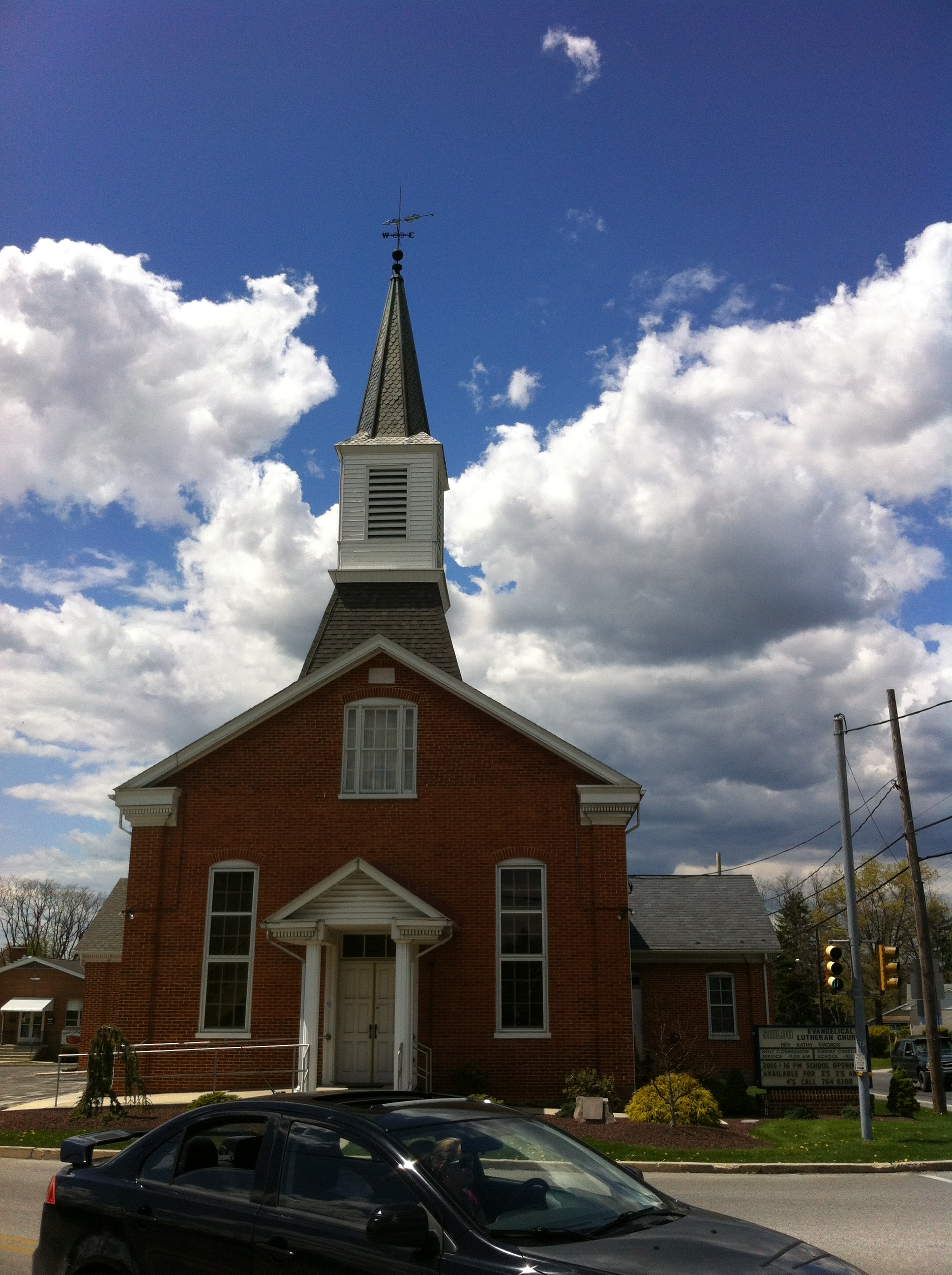
Shiloh Lutheran Church
