= Ruth Harper =

American politician

Ruth B. Harper

Member of the Pennsylvania House of Representatives from the 196th district
- In office January 4, 1977 – November 30, 1992
- Preceded by: Charles Hammock
- Succeeded by: Todd Platts

Personal details
- Born: December 24, 1927 Hinesville, Georgia
- Died: February 13, 2006 (aged 78) Philadelphia, Pennsylvania
- Party: Democratic

Ruth B. Harper (December 24, 1927 – February 13, 2006) was a Democratic member of the Pennsylvania House of Representatives.

== Formative years ==
Born in Hinesville, Georgia on December 24, 1927, Harper was a graduate of Cuyler-Beach High School. She also attended the Berean Institute School of Cosmetology and Business, Flamingo Modeling and Charm School, the Philadelphia Miniversity, LaSalle College, and Moore College of Art.

The owner and director of Ruth Harper's Modeling and Charm School from 1963 to 2004, and director of the Miss Ebony Pennsylvania Pageant. She was also an instructor at Simon Gratz High School, and Strawberry Mansion Junior High School, and a columnist for the Tioga News.

== Political career ==
Leader of the 13th Ward Democratic Committee, 23rd Division, Harper was also the founder and president of the North Central Women's Political Caucus. Elected to the Democratic National Committee, she served from 1979 to 1996. Elected to the Pennsylvania House of Representatives for the 1977 term, she served a total of eight consecutive terms. Appointed to the Pennsylvania Commission on Crime and Delinquency in 1979, she served in that role until 1984). She opted not to run for reelection to the House in 1992.

== Death and interment ==
Harper died on February 13, 2006, in Philadelphia, and was interred at Magnolia Memorial Gardens in Savannah, Georgia.
