= Mitchell Melton =

American politician (1943–2013)

Mitchell Wesley Melton

Member of the Pennsylvania House of Representatives from the 196th district
- In office January 7, 1969 – November 30, 1972
- Preceded by: District Created
- Succeeded by: Charles Hammock

Personal details
- Born: April 6, 1943 Philadelphia, Pennsylvania
- Died: March 11, 2013 (aged 69) Philadelphia, Pennsylvania
- Party: Democratic
- Spouse: Evelyn J. Melton
- Children: Tyrone Eugene Melton, Donna Marie Melton and Kevin Mitch Melton
- Education: Antioch Graduate School of Education M.Ed. 1978
- Occupation: Court Crier, Philadelphia Common Pleas Court

Mitchell Wesley Melton (April 6, 1943 – March 11, 2013) was a former Democratic member of the Pennsylvania House of Representatives. He was the founder, organizer and original spokesman of the Pennsylvania Legislative Black Caucus, founded in 1969.

Melton died from prostate cancer on March 11, 2013.

== Legislative work ==
Melton authored and sponsored House Bill No. 126, Printers No. 137, now Act No. 305. The bill provides for a period of Silent Prayer and Meditation, in each public school classroom, at the beginning of each school day, for those who are so disposed. This Bill became law in Pennsylvania, on December 6, 1972.

He also authored and sponsored House Bill No. 79, Printers No. 1479 now Act No. 57, which provides that any Pennsylvania motorist, who has been found guilty of an infraction of the motor vehicle code, and is sentenced to pay a fine and costs of prosecution, shall be given seven full days from the date of conviction, to pay such fine and costs before they can be imprisoned. This Bill became Law on July 29, 1971.

He was the founder, organizer and original spokesman of the Pennsylvania Legislative Black Caucus, founded in 1969.
