= Frederick Gutekunst =

American photographer (1831–1917)

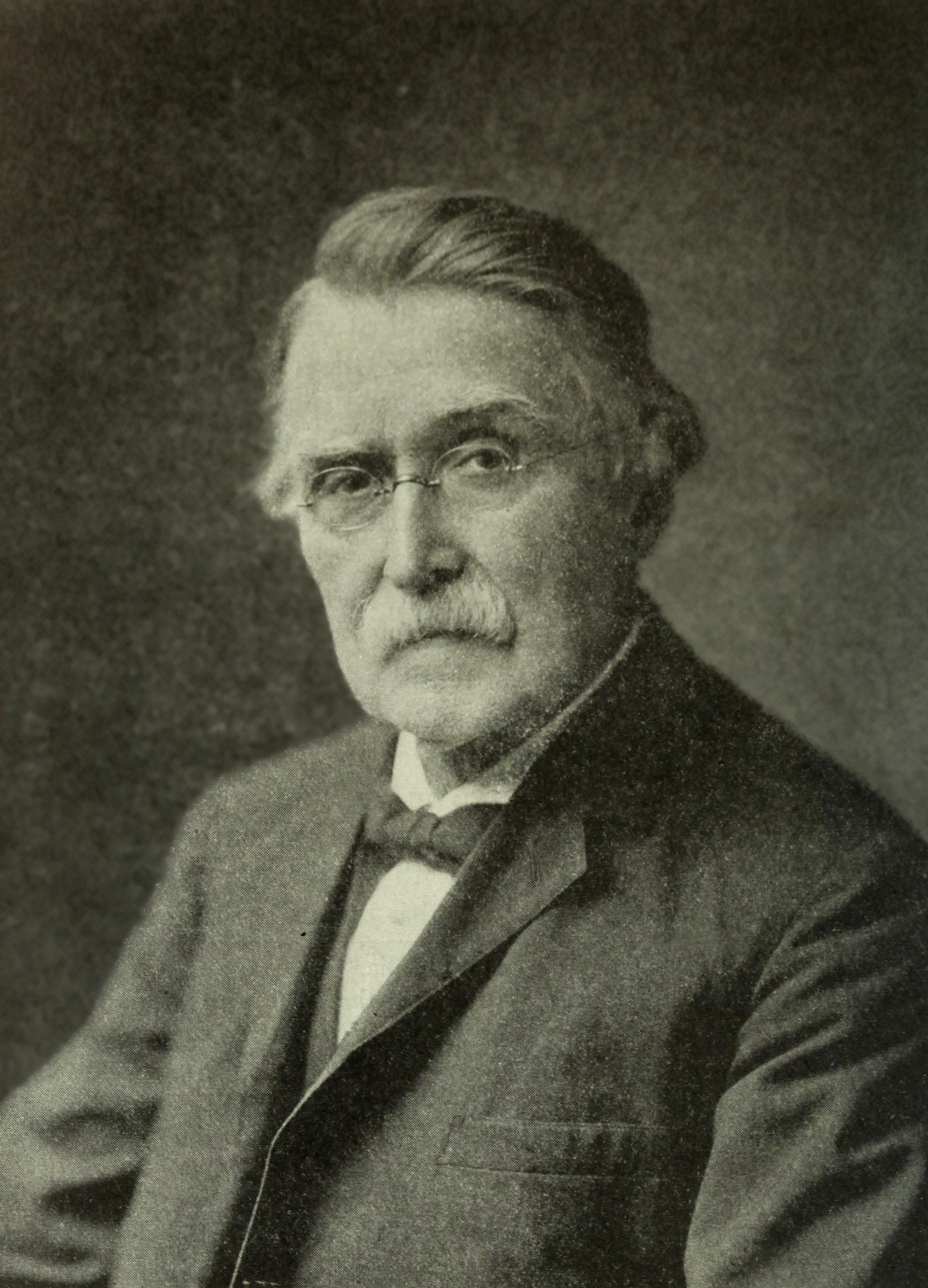
- Born: September 25, 1831; Philadelphia, Pennsylvania, US
- Died: April 27, 1917 (aged 85); Philadelphia, Pennsylvania, US
- Resting place: Laurel Hill Cemetery
- Occupation: Photographer

Frederick Gutekunst (September 25, 1831 – April 27, 1917) was an American photographer from Philadelphia, Pennsylvania. He opened his first photographic portrait studio with his brother in 1854 and successfully ran his business for sixty years. He grew to national prominence during the American Civil War and expanded his business to include two studios and a large phototype printing operation. He is known as the "Dean of American Photographers" due to his high quality portraits of dignitaries and celebrities. He worked as the official photographer of the Pennsylvania Railroad and received national and international recognition for his photographs of the Gettysburg battlefield and an innovative 10-foot long panoramic photograph of the Centennial Exposition.

== Early life and education ==
Gutekunst was born in 1831. His father was a cabinetmaker and the family name Gutekunst means "good art" in German. Most sources list Gutekunst's place of birth as Philadelphia. However, his obituary in the Photographic Journal of America lists Gutekunst's birthplace as Germany.

His father wanted young Frederick to become a lawyer and sent him to study law for six years under Joseph Simon Cohen, prothonotary to the Supreme Court of Pennsylvania. Gutekunst found the study of law "dry and uninteresting" and instead became interested in the emerging photographic technique of the daguerreotype. He was a frequent visitor to Marcus Aurelius Root's gallery and learned the craft of daguerreotype from photography pioneer Robert Cornelius. Gutekunst displayed an aptitude for chemistry and progressed the technique to convert a daguerreotype image unto a printable electrotype plate.

Frederick's father noticed his son's interest in chemistry and found an internship for him with a pharmacist, Frederick Klett. Gutekunst undertook a four-year apprenticeship with Klett and graduated from the Philadelphia College of Pharmacy in 1853.

== Career ==
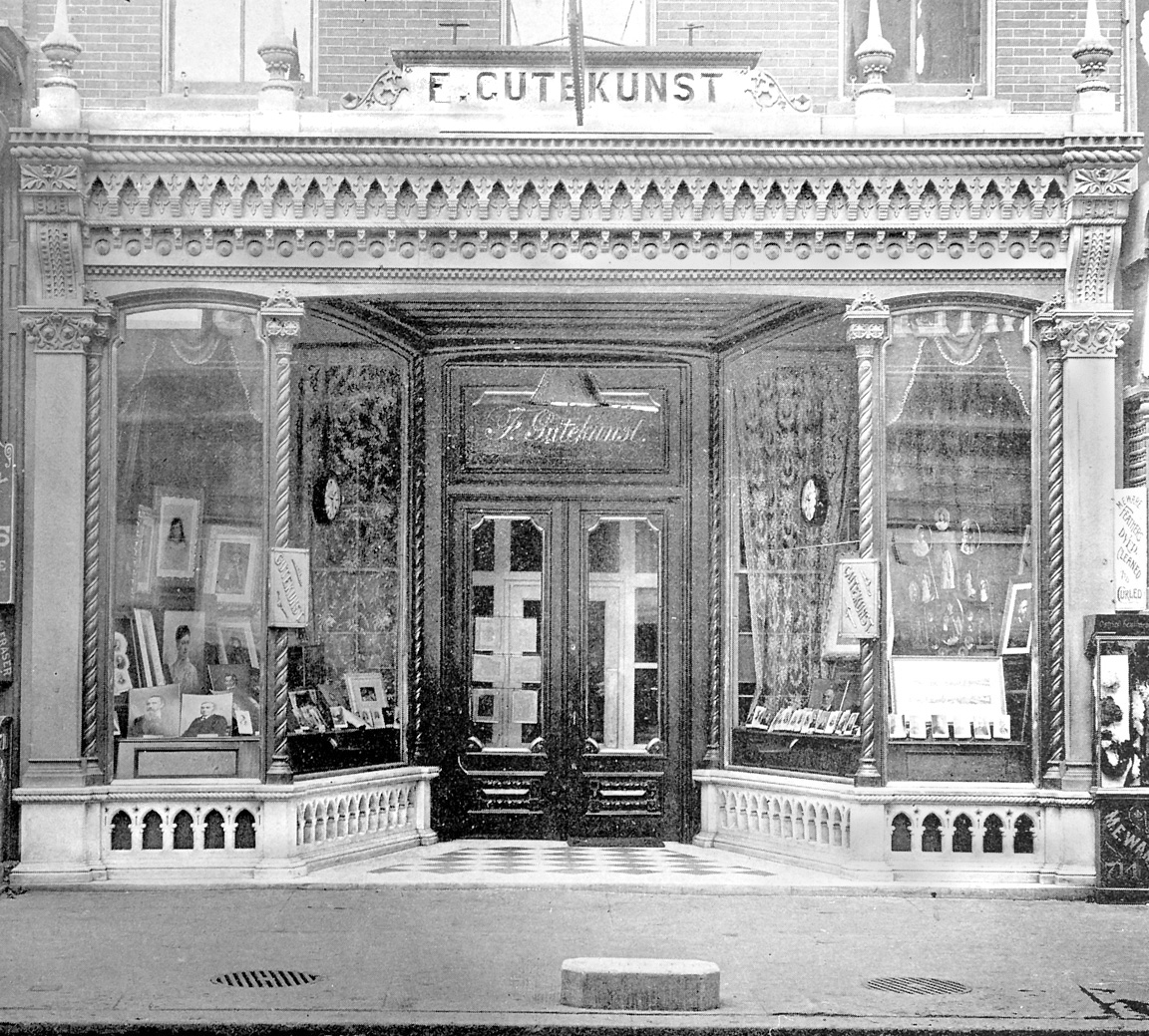
Gutekunst's studio at 712 Arch St. in Philadelphia

He worked for two years at a drug store in Philadelphia and began to collect parts to build a camera. He was able to purchase a lens and battery and his father built a box to house the camera. He joined the Franklin Institute and used their laboratory facilities to conduct scientific experiments. He created his own photographic plates coated with collodion and made ambrotypes of his friends in the back of the drug store. Gutekunst's brother, Louis, was a barber and helped financially support Frederick's interest in photography. In 1856, the two brothers opened a photography studio named Gutekunst & Brother. They worked together until 1860, when Louis went back to work as a barber.

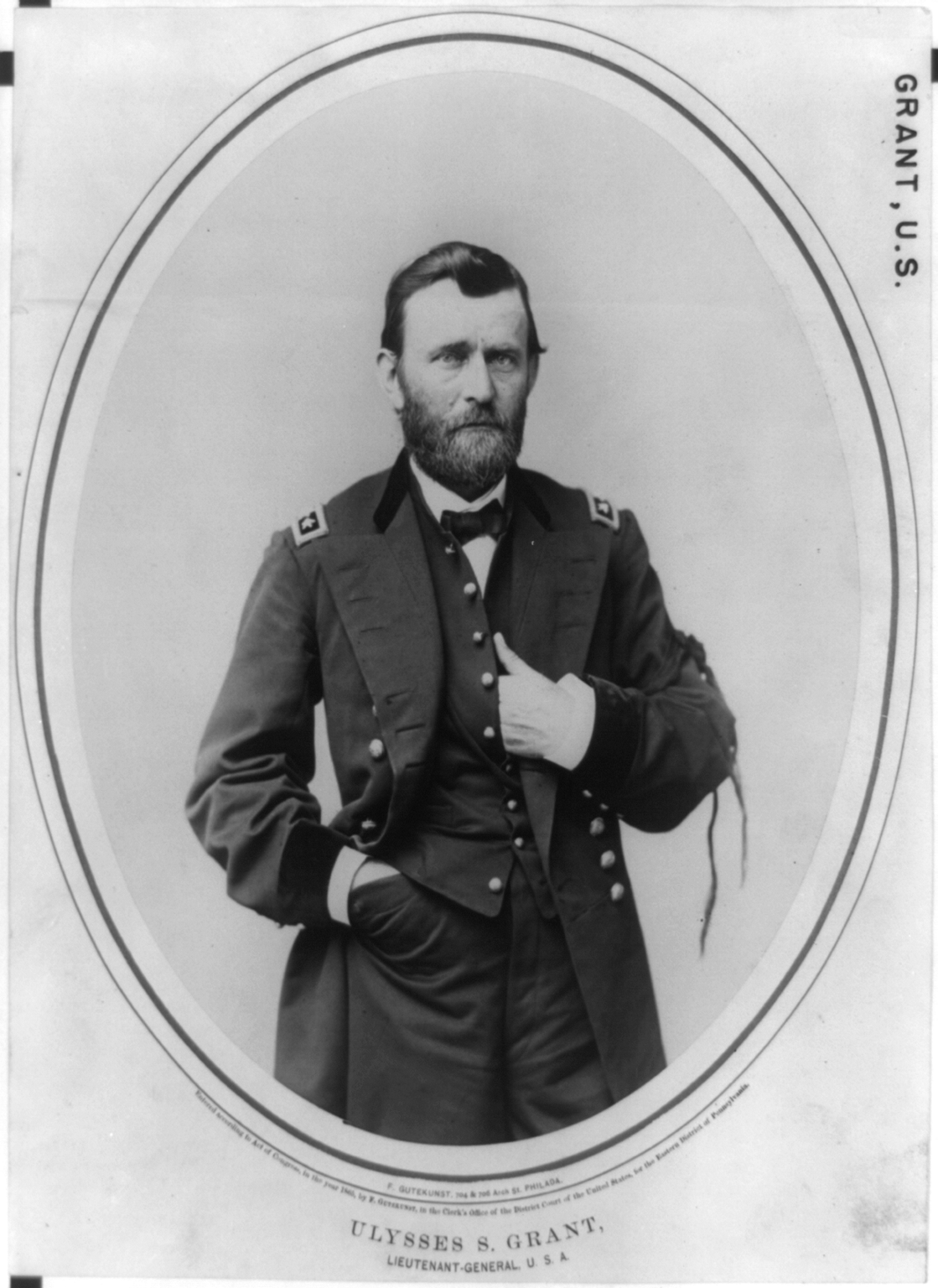
His portrait of Ulysses S. Grant created national interest and set Gutekunst apart from his contemporaries

The business grew quickly due to strong demand for photographs. The Civil War turned Gutekunst photography studio into an extremely popular destination. Philadelphia was a major center for military deployment and soldiers would have their portraits made in their uniforms as a memento for their families before going off to war. Generals George Meade, Ulysses S. Grant and Philip Sheridan also came to have their photographic portraits taken by Gutekunst The portrait of Grant in particular raised national interest and set Gutekunst apart from his contemporaries.

Gutekunst took photographs of numerous dignitaries and celebrities including Caroline Still Anderson, William Cullen Bryant, Grover Cleveland, William Lloyd Garrison, Abraham Lincoln, Henry Wadsworth Longfellow, William McKinley, Carl Schurz and Walt Whitman. He kept detailed listings of those he photographed and one of the ledgers is housed at the Library Company of Philadelphia.

He worked as the official photographer of the Pennsylvania Railroad and in 1875 photographed structures and scenery which were printed as a collection of stereo views.

Gutekunst became known as the "Dean of American Photography" and was recognized for his photographs of the Gettysburg battlefield. He created a ten-foot wide and 18 inch high panoramic photograph of the 1876 Centennial Exposition made from seven negatives. It was described as the largest photograph in the world at the time. His panoramic photograph won him medals from Austria, France and Italy as well as two gold-lined bronze vases from Japan.

Gutekunst was as much artist as businessman and on a visit to Germany in 1878 he purchased the rights for the Phototype process. One year later upon visit to Philadelphia, J. H. Fitzgibbons, the editor of the St. Louis Practical Photographer, noted that Gutekunst was manufacturing thousands of prints every day. Eventually, this new factory needed to move out of Arch Street and up to 813 Girard Ave where a staff of forty under the supervision of the engraver, James P. Harbeson, kept up with demand for reproduction for publications, etc. Girard Ave was a perfect location for this endeavor since this part of Philadelphia was more industrial and less retail than Arch St.

Some of the products of this venture were illustrations for books such as the Biographical Album of Prominent Pennsylvanians, Artistic Houses, and Artistic Country Seats published by D. Appleton & Co. of New York. Also, Gutekunst began to use what we would now call a panoramic camera which took a photo of one hundred and eighty degrees and from which the studio could produce a print thirty-six inches in length.

In 1885, he was elected as a member to the American Philosophical Society.

On the morning of January 26, 1886, a fire started at 715–719 Arch St. which burned down the five-story building at that address. Additionally, the fire spread across the street to the Gutekunst establishment and caused approximately $10,000 in damage.

By 1893 Gutekunst had been in business almost forty years and an additional studio was needed for the growing enterprise. The new studio was established in an upscale part of Philadelphia at 1700 N. Broad St. with William Braucher as manager. The success early in his career meant that he could move his home out of Center City Philadelphia and own a home on Pulaski Avenue in Germantown in Philadelphia. A year before his death Gutekunst incorporated his business and some of the older employees became stockholders, but Braucher resigned at that time. Gutekunst had successfully run his photographic studio for sixty years.

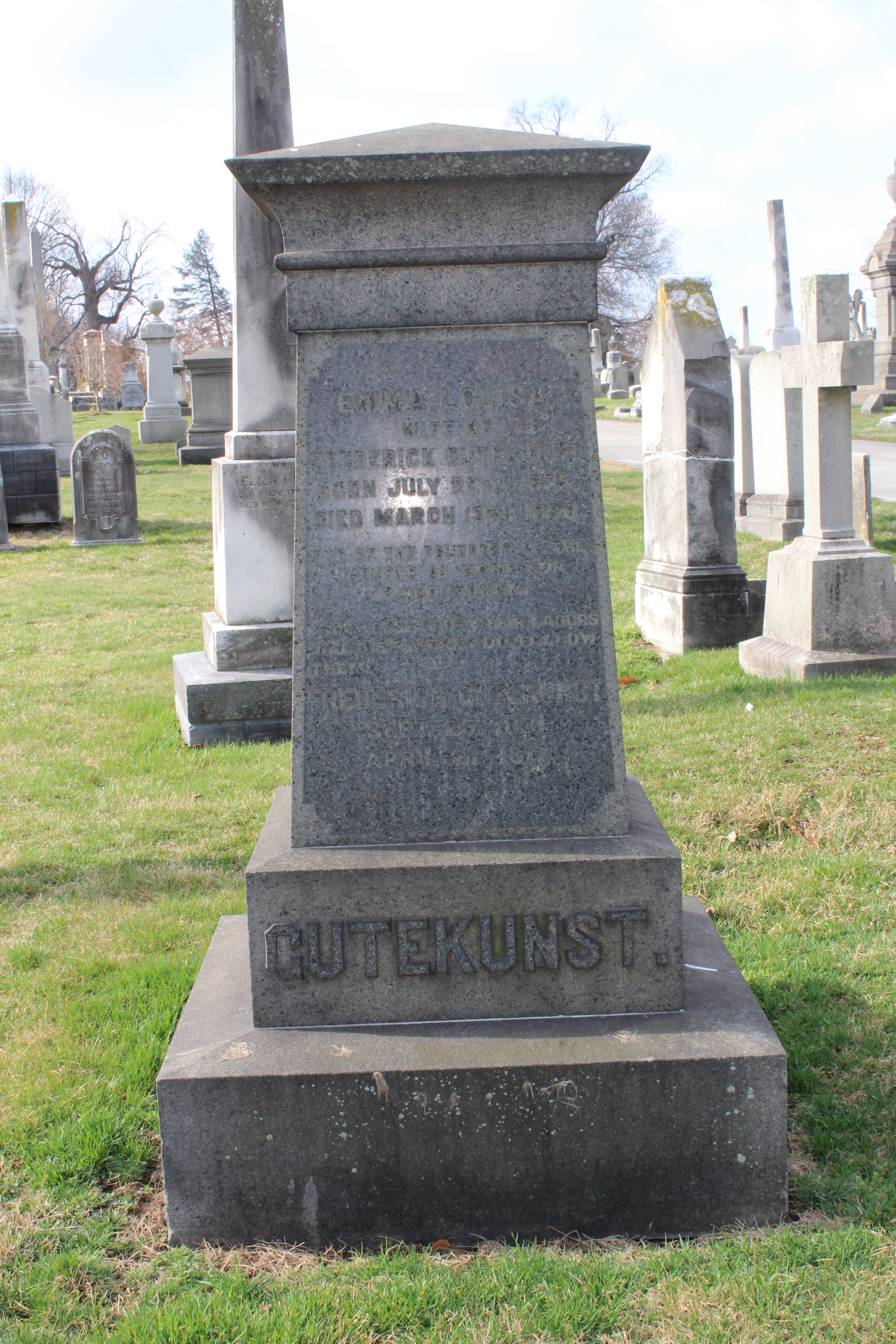
Frederick Gutekunst grave in Laurel Hill Cemetery

Frederick Gutekunst died April 27, 1917. Eight weeks earlier he fell down the steps of his N. Bouvier residence returning to his studio after lunch at home. This fall and Bright's disease seem to have caused his death. He was interred at Laurel Hill Cemetery in Philadelphia.

== Gallery ==
Selected Photographs by Frederick Gutekunst
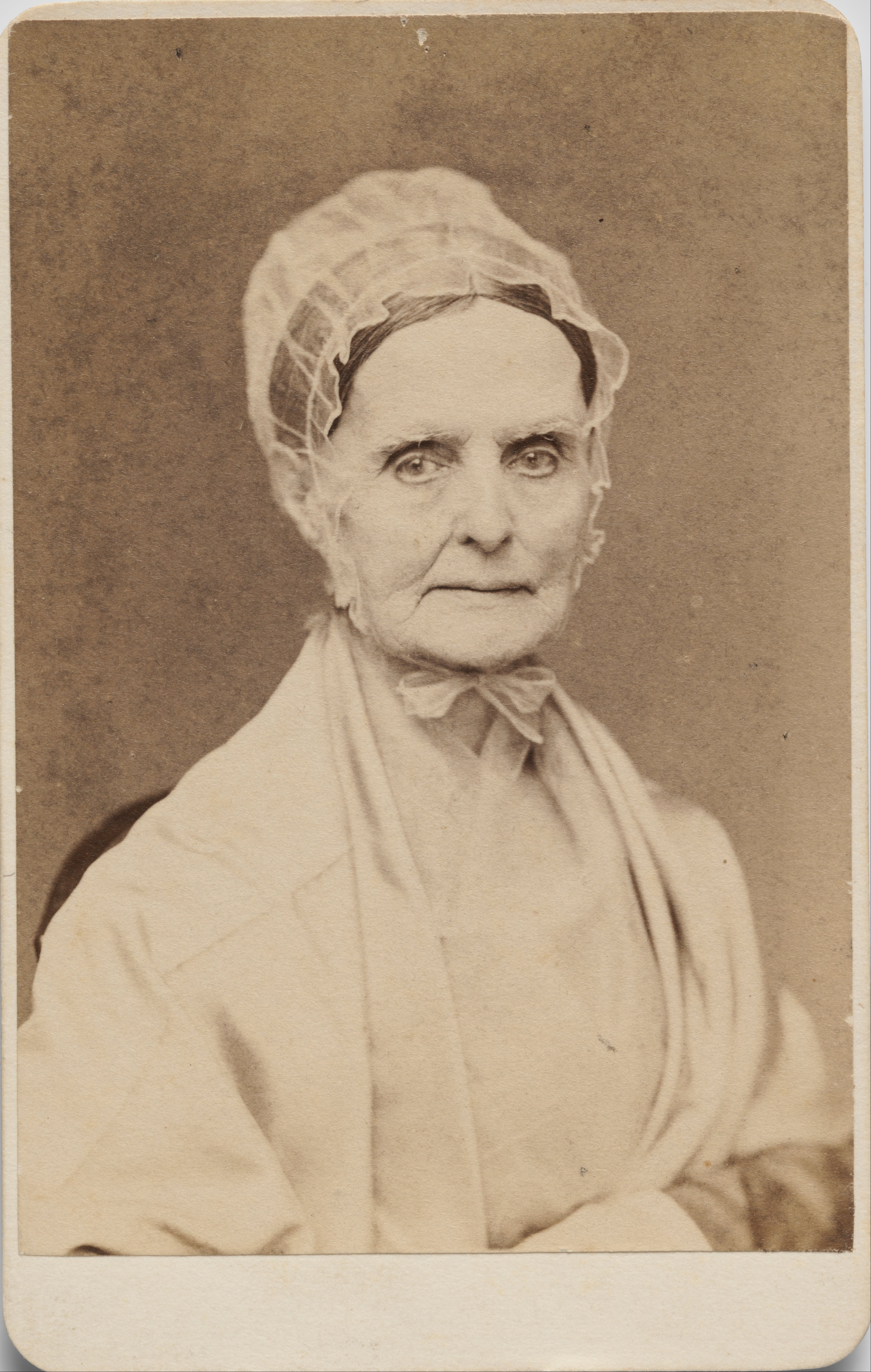
Lucretia Mott

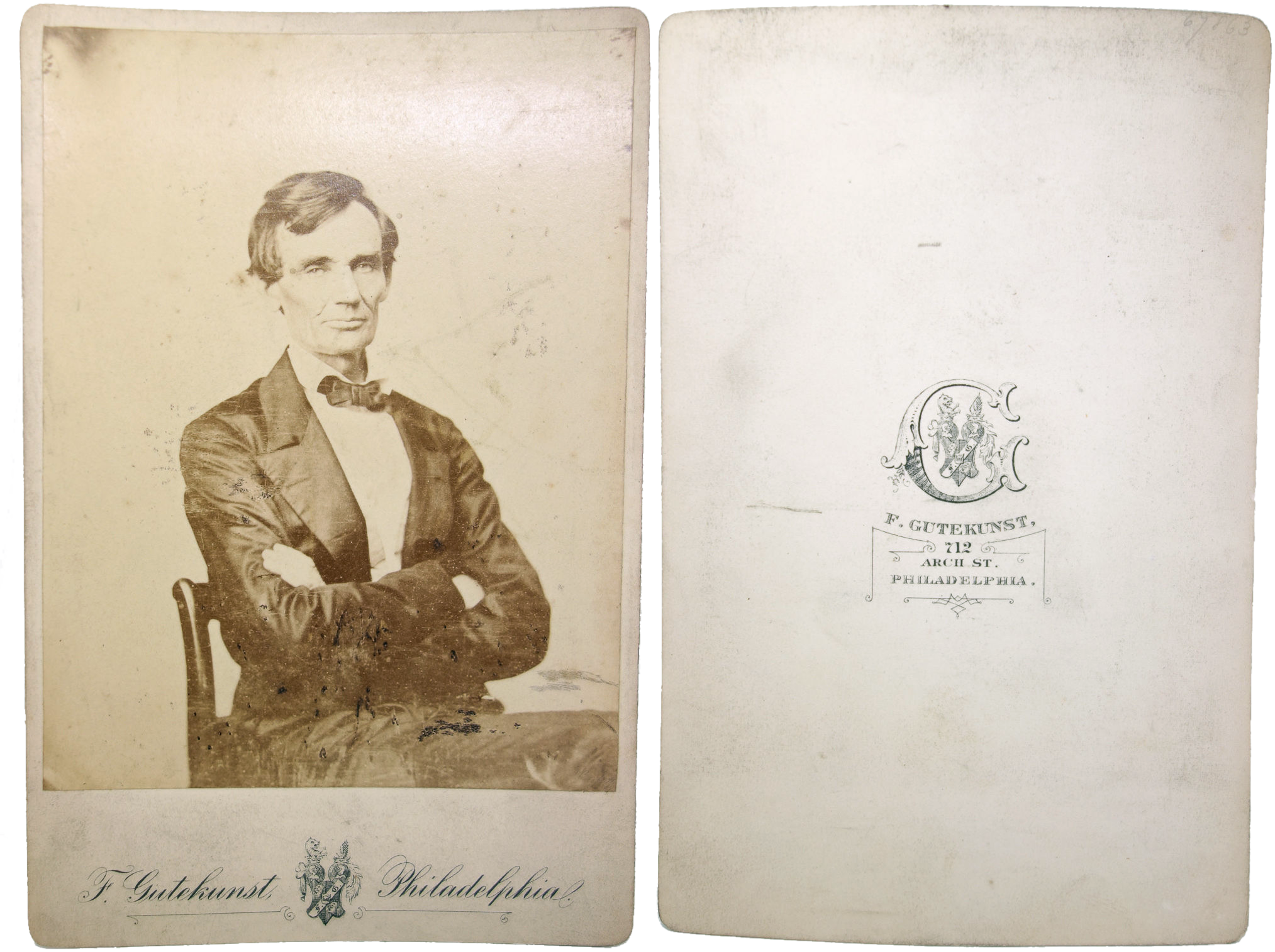
Abraham Lincoln

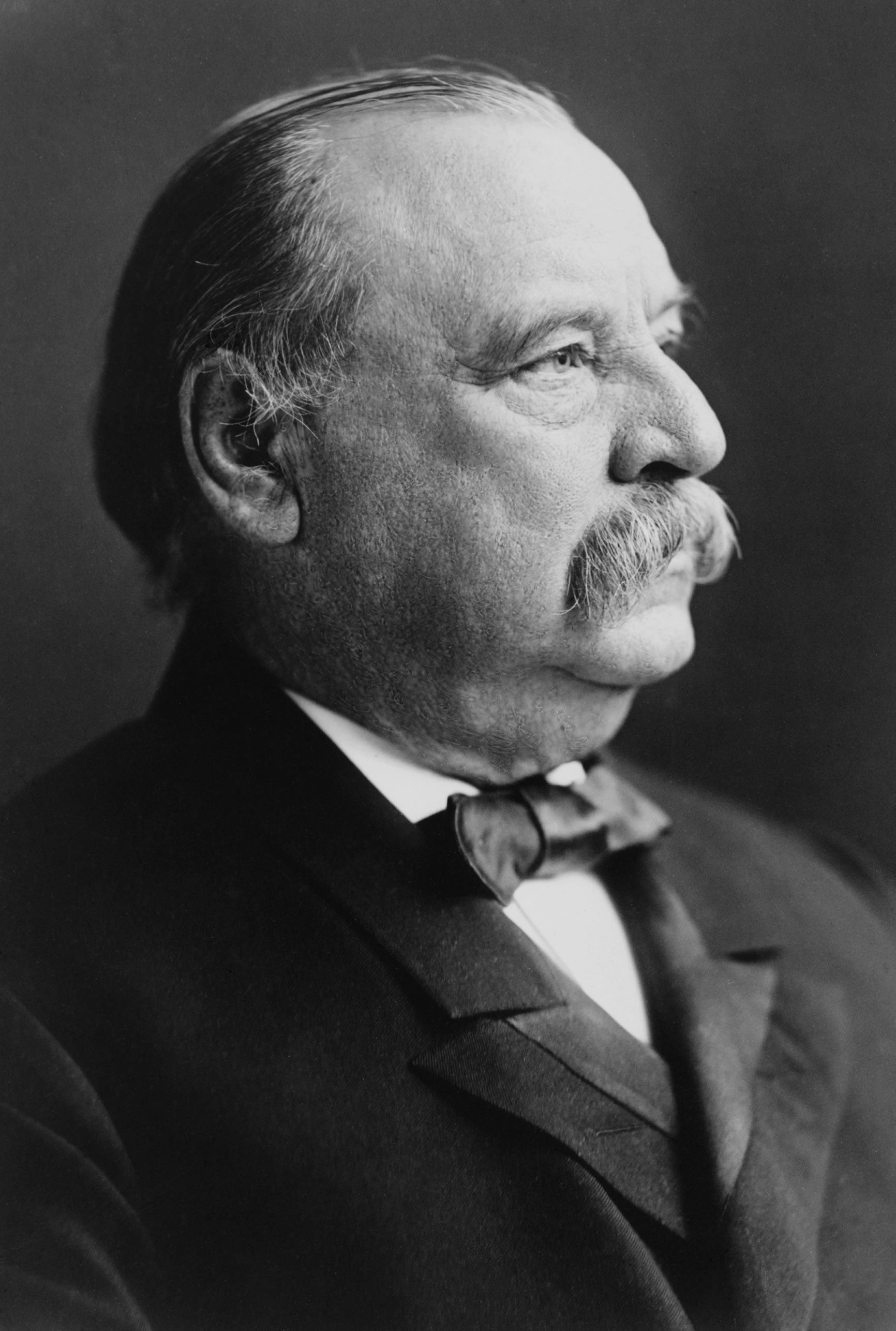
Grover Cleveland

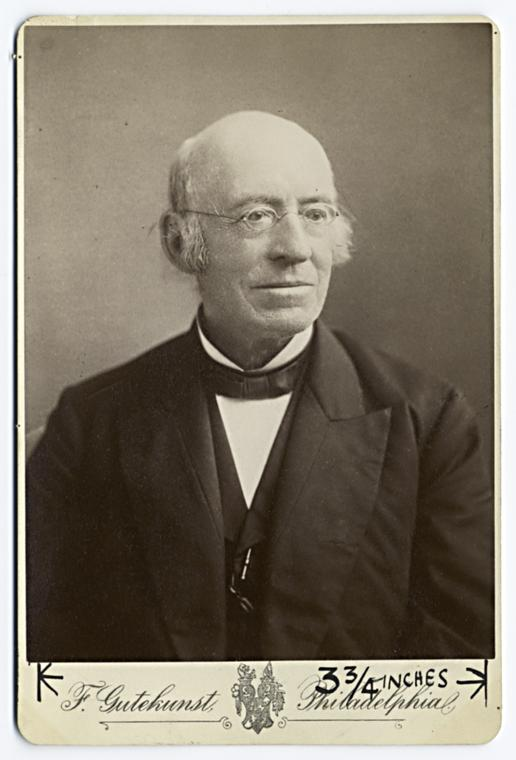
William Lloyd Garrison

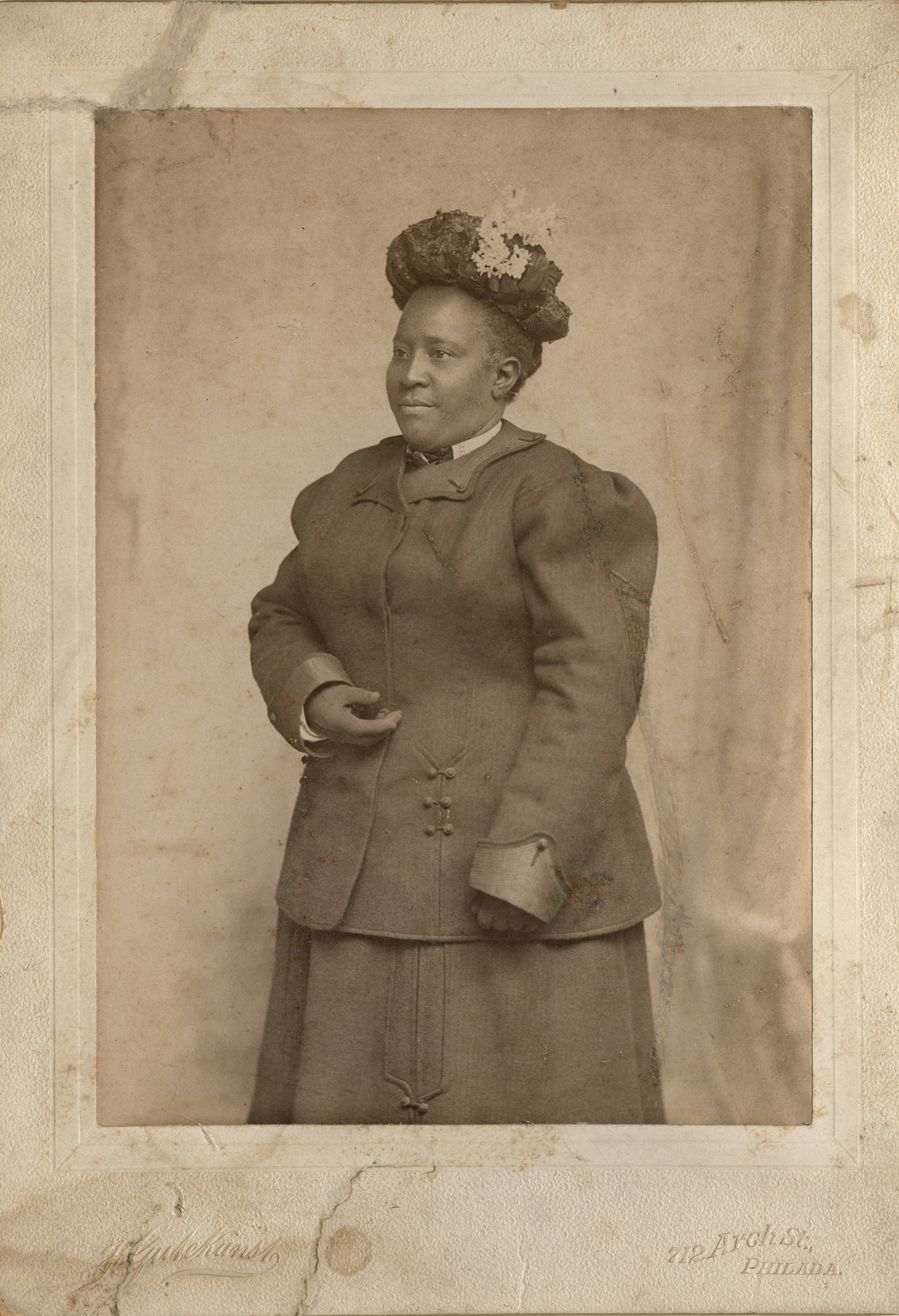
Caroline Still Anderson

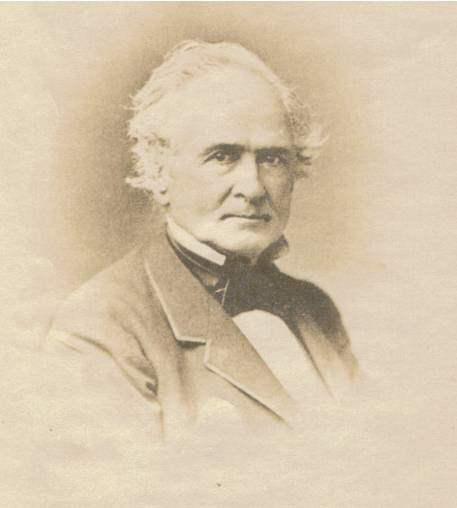
Robert Cornelius

== Sources ==
- Oberholtzer, Ellis Paxson (1912). Philadelphia: A History of the City and Its People, A Record of 225 Years, Volume 1. J.S. Clarke Publishing Company.
