= Samuel Stoner Homestead =

Historic house in Pennsylvania, United States

- U.S. National Register of Historic Places
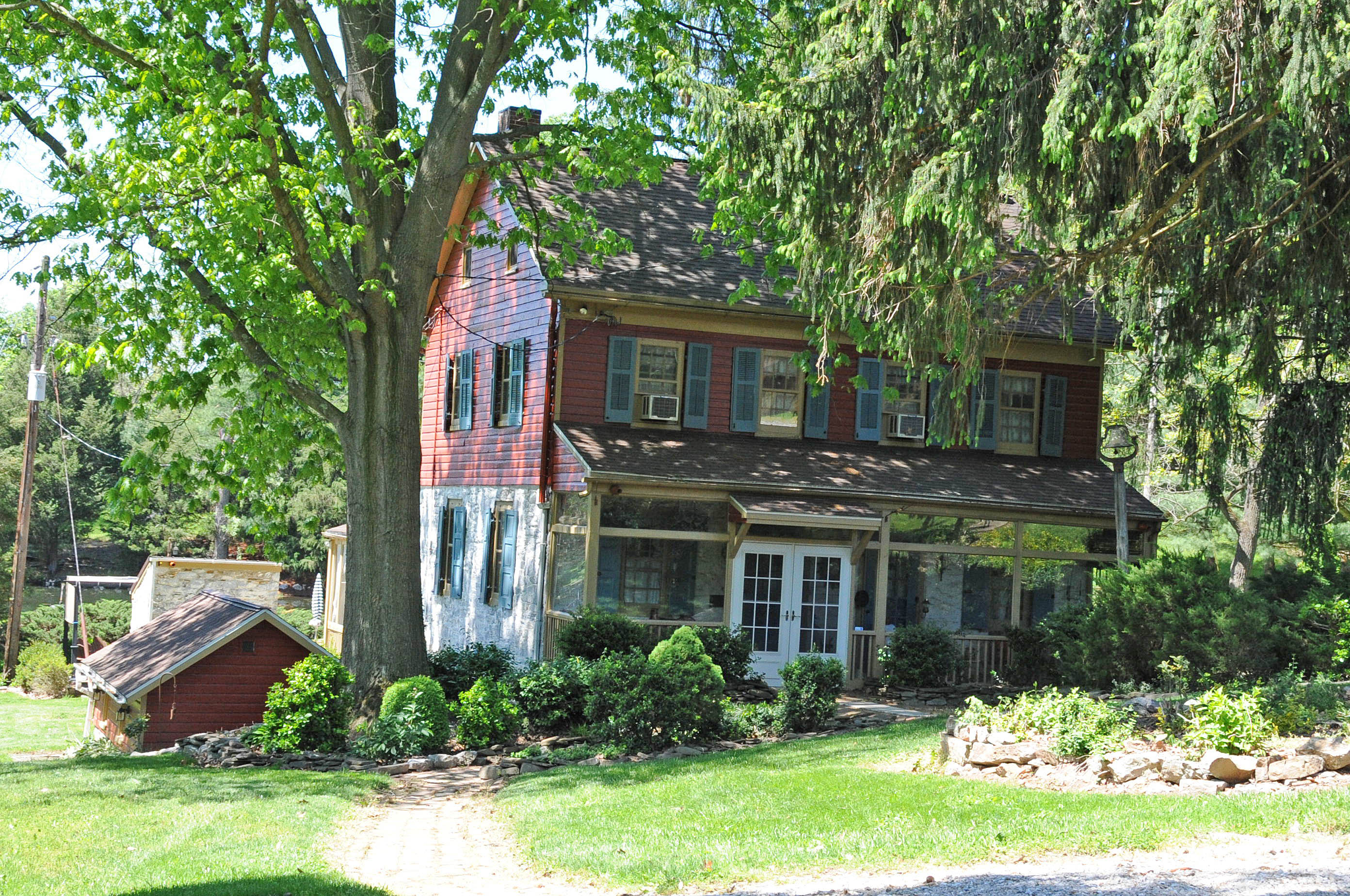

- Location within Pennsylvania Location within the United States
- Location: South of York off Pennsylvania Route 182, West Manchester Township, Pennsylvania
- Coordinates: 39°55′25″N 76°45′48″W
- Area: 6 acres (2.4 ha)
- Built: c. 1800, c. 1835, c. 1850
- Built by: Stoner, Samuel
- NRHP reference No.: 76001684
- Added to NRHP: January 30, 1976

The Samuel Stoner Homestead, also known as Indian Road Farm, Bechtel Farm, and Wiest Dam, is an historic home and farm property that is located in West Manchester Township, York County, Pennsylvania.

It was added to the National Register of Historic Places in 1976.

== History and architectural features ==
The historic house was developed in three stages: a 1 1/2-story, Germanic-influenced, limestone, banked house that was built between 1798 and 1801, a second story added circa 1835, and a two-story, three-bay, stone addition that was built circa 1850. The house measures sixty-two feet by thirty feet.

Also located on the property is a small stone and frame springhouse, a small stone smoke house, and a small frame and stone bank barn, all dating to the mid-nineteenth century.
