= Berean Institute =

Former vocational education school in Philadelphia, Pennsylvania

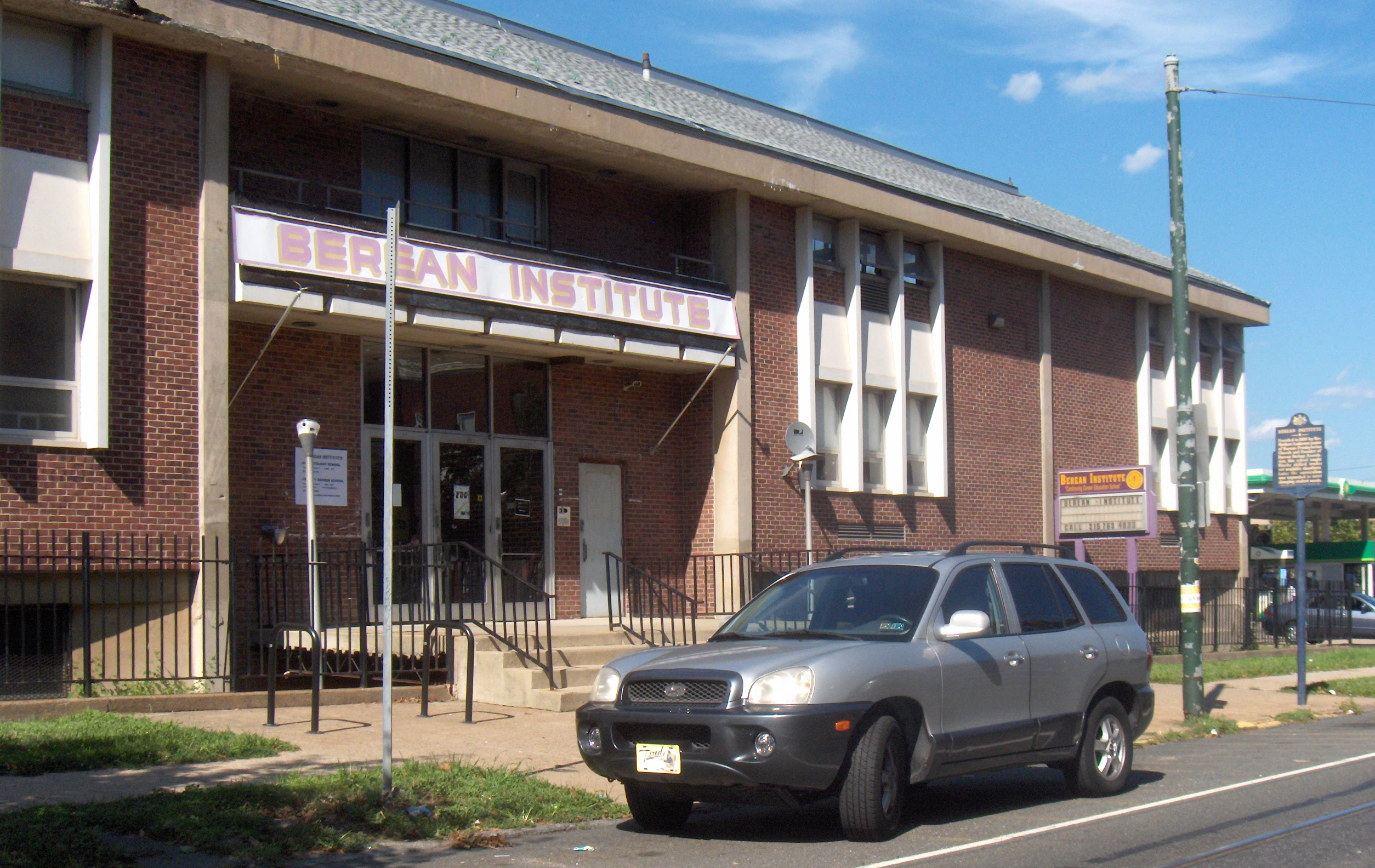
- Berean Institute building exterior in 2010

Location
- 1901 W Girard Ave; Philadelphia, PA 19130; United States

Information
- Former name: Berean Manual Training and Industrial School
- Type: Vocational education
- Founded: 1899
- Founder: Matthew Anderson
- Status: Closed
- Closed: 2012
- Gender: Co-ed

Berean Institute, founded as the Berean Manual Training and Industrial School, was a vocational school for predominantly African American adult learners in Philadelphia, Pennsylvania. Founded in 1899 by Rev. Matthew Anderson and Dr. Caroline Still Anderson and located at 1901 W. Girard Avenue, the school offered business and vocational training for both men and women. The Institute closed in 2012.

== History ==
Six prominent Philadelphia citizens organized the Berean Manual Training and Industrial School on November 6, 1899. The organizers included Dr. Matthew Anderson, a leader in the city's Black community and the pastor of the Berean Presbyterian Church, which he had founded in June 1880. In 1888, Anderson had founded the Berean Building and Loan Association, which grew to manage more than $150,000 of stock on behalf of 700 members of Philadelphia's African American community as of 1909. Anderson went on to serve as principal of the Berean Institute from 1899 until his death in 1928. His wife, Dr. Caroline Still Anderson, a physician and educator who like her husband was a graduate of Oberlin College, served as the school's assistant principal until her death in 1919. The Berean Institute took its name from the biblical city of Berea and from Berea, Ohio, where Anderson preached during his time at Oberlin.

The Berean Institute filled a critical community need, as the vast majority of US vocational schools in this period were racially segregated, and Philadelphia-area African Americans had no formal vocational training options until the Institute opened. The founders also highlighted the need for vocational training for recent waves of Black migrants from the South. From six instructors and 25 students in 1899, the Berean Institute had grown to 300 students and 16 instructors by 1909. Classes were held at night as most students worked during the day. Adult students learned arithmetic, reading and writing, bookkeeping, electrical wiring, carpentry, upholstery, sewing, hatmaking, typewriting and stenography, cooking, and waitering.

The Berean Institute received its inaugural charter from the Commonwealth of Pennsylvania in 1904, which enabled it to start receiving funding support from the Commonwealth. In 1908, it moved from temporary quarters in the basement of the Berean Presbyterian Church to a newly constructed three-story brick building on Girard Avenue. The school moved again to a larger brick building on Girard Avenue in 1973. The Berean curriculum expanded to include two-year programs and high school completion courses, cosmetology, salesmanship, information technology, management, finance, dietetics and nutrition, ESL courses targeted to the Puerto Rican community, and more. Enrollment was open to all students regardless of race or color.

In the 1980s, the Berean Institute enrolled 200-300 students. The Institute's enrollment fluctuated over the years but experienced overall decline, with its academic programs having 92 students in 2005 and 157 students in 2007. Enrollment plummeted to just six students in 2008, after the school lost its accreditation and after an independent audit found inadequate recordkeeping by the Institute, which had experienced at least four consecutive years of operating losses. The Berean Institute officially closed when the Commonwealth evicted the Institute from its state-owned building in late 2012. The Institute had failed to make lease payments since 2006 while subletting parts of the building in violation of its lease and failing to pay its utility bills.

== Legacy ==
The Philadelphia Technician Training Institute purchased the institute's vacated building in 2015 for $2.8 million and uses the space for a trade school.

On October 17, 1990, the Pennsylvania Historical and Museum Commission installed a roadside historical marker to mark the Institute building on Girard Avenue. The marker's text states, "Founded in 1899 by Rev. Matthew Anderson, pastor of Berean Presbyterian Church and founder of Berean Savings Association, this school taught Blacks skilled trades not available elsewhere. Later the curriculum was expanded to meet changing student needs."

Institute alumni included Pennsylvania state representative Ruth Harper (1927–2006). Past board members included pastor Henry L. Phillips.
