= Todd Platts =

American politician, judge, and attorney (born 1962)

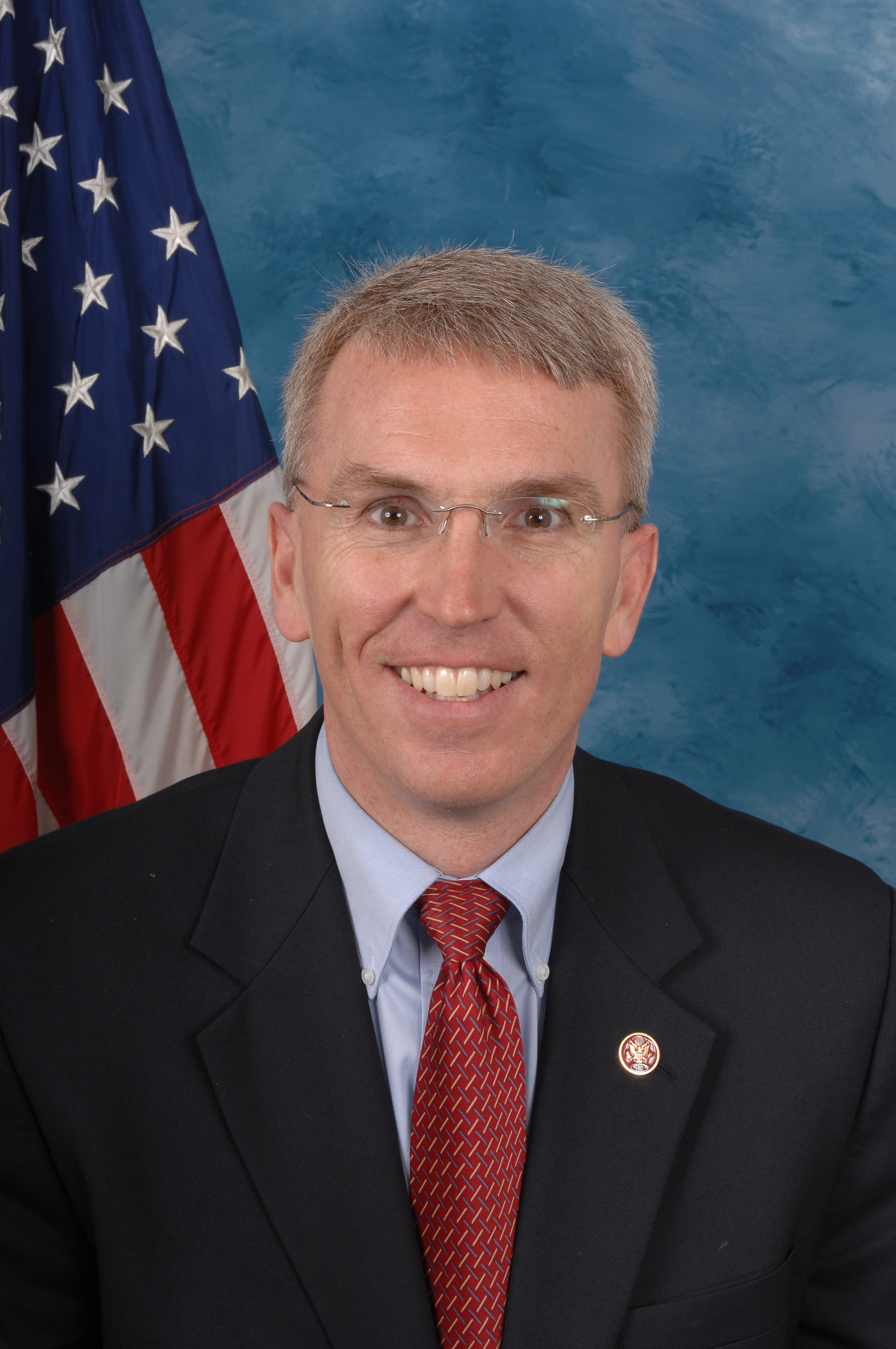

Member of the U.S. House of Representatives from Pennsylvania's 19th district
- In office January 3, 2001 – January 3, 2013
- Preceded by: Bill Goodling
- Succeeded by: Scott Perry (redistricted)

Member of the Pennsylvania House of Representatives from the 196th district
- In office January 5, 1993 – November 30, 2000
- Preceded by: Ruth Harper
- Succeeded by: Beverly Mackereth

Personal details
- Born: Todd Russell Platts; March 5, 1962 (age 64) York, Pennsylvania, U.S.
- Party: Republican
- Spouse: Leslie
- Children: 2
- Education: Shippensburg University (BS); Pepperdine University (JD)

Todd Russell Platts (born March 5, 1962) is an American attorney and Republican Party politician who serves as a judge on the York County Court of Common Pleas and is a former U.S. representative for Pennsylvania's 19th congressional district, serving from 2001 to 2013.

The district, since redrawn and renumbered, encompassed south-central Pennsylvania, including all of York and Adams Counties, and a large portion of Cumberland County. York, Hanover, Gettysburg and Carlisle were some of the prominent cities and towns included. In January 2012, Platts announced his intention to retire from Congress.

== Early life and education ==
Platts was born in York, Pennsylvania, on March 5, 1962. He graduated from York Suburban Senior High School in 1980. He continued his education locally, graduating summa cum laude with a Bachelor of Science degree in Public Administration from Shippensburg University of Pennsylvania in 1984. He then attended Pepperdine University School of Law, and graduated cum laude with a Juris Doctor degree in 1991. He is an Episcopalian.

== Pennsylvania House of Representatives ==
Platts was first elected to public office in November 1992, to represent the 196th legislative district in the Pennsylvania House of Representatives. The election marked the first time that the 196th district was fought on its present boundaries; following the 1990 census, the approved legislative reapportionment plan moved it out of Philadelphia, and into its present boundaries. He took office on January 5, 1993, and left on November 30, 2000.

== U.S. House of Representatives ==
=== Elections ===
While in Congress, Platts refused to accept contributions from any special interests or political action committees. He also promised to serve only six terms (12 years) in the House.

2000

Platts was elected to the U.S. House of Representatives in 2000, after winning a little over half the vote in a crowded Republican primary, and easily defeating college professor Jeff Sanders, the Democratic nominee, in the general election. He replaced Congressman Bill Goodling, who chose not to run for re-election that year.

2002–2006

Platts ran unopposed by the Democratic Party during the 2002 and 2004 elections, although in 2002, he faced opposition in the Republican primary, most notably from Tom Glennon. He faced York College professor and decorated Vietnam Veteran Phil Avillo, Jr., the Democratic nominee, and Derf Maitland of the Green Party in the 2006 election. Platts won 64% of the vote to Avillo's 33% and Maitland's 3%.

2008

- United States House of Representatives elections in Pennsylvania, 2008#District 19

In 2008, Platts and Avillo faced off again. With 67% of the vote, Platts became the most electorally successful Republican Congressional candidate in the Northeast.

2010

- United States House of Representatives elections in Pennsylvania, 2010#District 19

Platts was challenged by Democratic nominee Ryan Sanders and Independent Patriots nominee Joshua Monighan. Platts was re-elected to a sixth term with 72% of the vote.

=== Tenure ===
As a Congressman, Platts supported many of President George W. Bush's initiatives, tax cuts, drilling in ANWR, the Medicare Prescription Drug Plan, the Iraq War, and a ban on same-sex marriage.

He opposed any version of Bush's school voucher proposal, supported offshore oil drilling, supported increasing government regulated fuel efficiency standards for automobiles, voted for the Matthew Shepard Act, a hate crimes prevention bill, and supported the McCain-Feingold campaign finance legislation. In 2006, the National Journal political index describes him as having a moderate voting record despite the relatively conservative nature of his district, although the district does include some exurbs of Baltimore, Maryland. That journal gave him "conservative" ratings of 53% (economy), 65% (social issues) and 73% (foreign policy) in the 2004 congress. Platts' district went 64–36 for Bush in 2004. He has broken with his party on several issues, for example supporting President Obama's expansion of SCHIP and the Edward M. Kennedy Serve America Act.

He is a member of the Republican Main Street Partnership and supports stem-cell research. Early in his political career, after his initial election to the Pennsylvania House, Platts supported abortion rights. However, he later changed his views and became anti-abortion. He remained so through his congressional career, and he had an anti-abortion voting record as a Congressman.

Platts consistently voted against bail-outs of the financial industry and the automakers. He also voted against the economic stimulus legislation, the fiscal year 2009 Omnibus Appropriations Act, and fiscal year 2010 Budget Resolution.

Platts was one of fifteen Republican House members to vote in favor of repealing the United States military's "Don't Ask, Don't Tell" ban on openly gay service members.

Along with nearly all other Republican members of the US House of Representatives, Mr. Platts voted to support The Path to Prosperity, the budget put forward by U.S. Representative Paul Ryan (R-WI). However, the next year he joined nine other Republicans in voting against Rep. Ryan's budget.

=== Committee assignments ===
- Committee on Armed Services
  - Subcommittee on Tactical Air and Land Forces
  - Subcommittee on Seapower and Projection Forces
- Committee on Education and the Workforce
  - Subcommittee on Early Childhood, Elementary and Secondary Education
  - Subcommittee on Higher Education and Workforce Training
- Committee on Oversight and Government Reform
  - Subcommittee on Government Organization, Efficiency and Financial Management (Chairman)
  - Subcommittee on National Security, Homeland Defense and Foreign Operations

Caucus Memberships

- Congressional Arts Caucus

== Judicial career ==
In 2013, Platts announced that he was running for a seat on the York County Court of Common Pleas. In a poll conducted by the York County Bar Association, 77% of its members responded that they believed Platts to be "not qualified" to serve on the bench. Platts and incumbent judge Mike Flannelly, also a Republican, who was appointed to the seat in 2012 following the death of Judge Chuck Patterson, both cross-filed to run in both the Democratic and Republican primary elections. Platts won the Republican primary 56%–44%, while Flannelly won the Democratic primary by the same margin. Platts and Flannelly faced each other again in the general election in November, which Platts won with 58% of the vote, to serve a ten-year term.

In 2023, Platts was retained by an overwhelming margin and elected to a second ten-year term with an expiration in 2033.

U.S. House of Representatives
Preceded by William F. Goodling	Member of the U.S. House of Representatives from Pennsylvania's 19th congressional district 2001–2013	Constituency abolished
U.S. order of precedence (ceremonial)
Preceded by John E. Peterson as Former U.S. Representative	Order of precedence of the United States as Former U.S. Representative	Succeeded by Jim Gerlach as Former U.S. Representative
