= West York Area School District =

School district in Pennsylvania

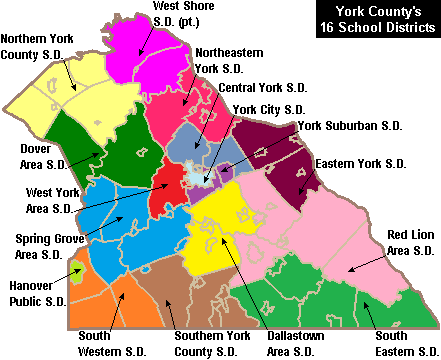

Address
- 2605 West Market Street York, York County, Pennsylvania, 17404; United States

District information
- Type: Public

Students and staff
- District mascot: Bulldog
- Colors: Navy Blue White

Other information
- Website: www.wyasd.org

West York Area School District is a midsized, suburban public school district located in York County in South Central Pennsylvania, United States. The West York Area School District includes West York Borough and West Manchester Township. It encompasses approximately 21 square miles (54 km^{2}). According to 2000 federal census data, it served a resident population of 21,356. By 2010, the District's population grew to 23,664 people. In 2009, the District residents’ per capita income was $21,915, while the median family income was $52,309. In the Commonwealth, the median family income was $49,501 and the United States median family income was $49,445, in 2010.

Schools in the district are:

- West York Area High School (Grades 9–12)
- West York Area Middle School (Grades 6–8)
- Lincolnway Elementary School (Grades 2–3)
- Wallace Elementary (Grades K–1)
- Norman A. Trimmer Elementary (Grades 1–5)

== Extracurriculars ==
West York School District's students have access to a variety of clubs, activities and an extensive sports program.

=== Sports ===
The District funds:

Boys

- Baseball - AAA
- Basketball- AAA
- Cross Country - AAA
- Football - AAA
- Golf - AAA
- Lacrosse - AAAA
- Soccer - AAA
- Swimming and Diving - AA
- Tennis - AAA
- Track and Field - AAA
- Volleyball - AA
- Wrestling - AAA

Girls

- Basketball - AAA
- Cross Country - AA
- Field Hockey - AA
- Golf - AAA
- Lacrosse - AAAA
- Soccer (Fall) - AA
- Softball - AAA
- Swimming and Diving - AA
- Girls' Tennis - AAA
- Track and Field - AA
- Volleyball - AA

Middle School Sports

Boys

- Basketball
- Cross Country
- Football
- Soccer
- Track and Field
- Wrestling

Girls

- Basketball
- Cross Country
- Field Hockey
- Softball (Fall)
- Track and Field
- Volleyball

According to PIAA directory July 2012
