= West York Area High School =

Public school in Pennsylvania, US

Coordinates: 39.95943°N 76.76414°W

West York Area School District

Location
- 1800 Bannister Street; York, Pennsylvania 17404-4917; United States

Information
- Type: Public
- Principal: Carrie Jones
- Faculty: 70
- Teaching staff: 61.47 (FTE)
- Grades: 9-12
- Enrollment: 860 (2023–2024)
- Student to teacher ratio: 13.99
- Color: Navy White
- Website: https://westyorkareahighschool.wyasd.org/

West York Area High School is a high school located in York, York County in south central Pennsylvania. According to the National Center for Education Statistics, the school reported an enrollment of 871 students in grades 9 through 12 in the 2018–2019 school year.

Part of the West York Area School District, the school serves children in grades nine through twelve. It operates on a two-semester, four term year with block scheduling of five-period days, each period lasting 66 minutes. Students may attend the local technical school or specialized center on a part-time basis. Career internships and diversified occupations programs are also available for seniors.

== Campus ==
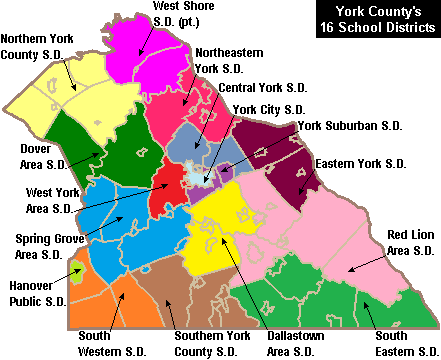

In 2009, the West York Area School Board began the process of upgrading the facilities at the school, beginning with the opening of a new gym in October 2014. The development was completed in 2016 when a new two-story wing was added that includes eight additional classrooms and a large group instruction/meeting room. The existing science labs were renovated and three new labs were added. A new choral room was provided, along with a new guidance suite and the school auditorium was equipped with upgraded stage rigging, lights and sound systems.

== Extracurricular activities ==
West York Area High School students have access to a wide variety of clubs, activities, and an extensive sports program.

=== Sport teams ===
The school uses navy blue and white as spirit colors, and its mascot is a Bulldog. The school is a member of PIAA AAA athletics class. In 2008, the school's football team won their Division with a 9–1 regular season record. They went on to become the first team from YAIAA to win an AA or AAA district championship, when they won the District III Championship in Hershey. The Bulldogs' 2008 season came to an end, though, on December 5 at Altoona's Mansion Park Stadium, where the Bulldogs fell 49–21 to defending state champions, Thomas Jefferson High School. West York's final record was 13–2, the best in school history.

Boys

- Baseball
- Basketball
- Cross Country
- Football
- Golf
- Lacrosse
- Soccer
- Swimming and Diving
- Tennis
- Track and Field
- Volleyball
- Wrestling

Girls

- Basketball
- Cross Country
- Field Hockey
- Golf
- Lacrosse
- Soccer (Fall)
- Softball
- Swimming and Diving
- Tennis
- Track and Field
- Volleyball

=== Music ===
The school produces a musical each year; recent productions have included Crazy for You in 2012, Brigadoon in 2011 and Thoroughly Modern Millie in 2010.

The school's marching band has been directed by Samuel Brooks since 2026. The band show each year is themed; recent themes have included the music of Ray Charles in 2012-13 and Elvis Presley in 2011–12. Previous themes have included American Tapestry, Island Pulse and the songs of Billy Joel.

The school also maintains a Jazz Ensemble (also directed by Samuel Brooks). This group performs a few times a year at the high school as well as at the York County: Distinguished Young Women competition.
