= Rebecca Cole (physician) =

American physician (1846–1922)

Dr Rebecca J. Cole
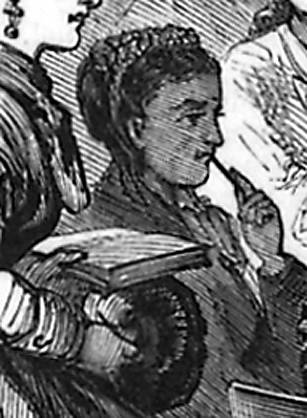
- Born: March 16, 1846; Philadelphia, Pennsylvania, U.S.
- Died: August 14, 1922 (aged 76); Philadelphia, Pennsylvania, U.S.
- Education: Woman's Medical College of Pennsylvania
- Known for: Second female African American physician
- Scientific career
- Fields: Internal medicine
- Workplaces: New York Infirmary for Indigent Women and Children
- Doctoral advisor: Ann Preston; Elizabeth Blackwell

Rebecca J. Cole (March 16, 1846 – August 14, 1922) was an American physician, organization founder and social reformer. In 1867, she became the second African-American woman to become a doctor in the United States, after Rebecca Lee Crumpler three years earlier. Throughout her life she faced racial and gender-based barriers to her medical education, training in all-female institutions which were run by the first generation of graduating female physicians.

== Early life and education ==
Cole was born in Philadelphia on March 16, 1846, one of five children. Her father was a laborer and her mother was a laundress. One of her sisters, Sarah Elizabeth Cole, married Henry L. Phillips, a prominent African American Episcopal priest, c. 1876.

Cole attended high school at the Institute for Colored Youth where the curriculum that included Latin, Greek, and mathematics, graduating in 1863.

Cole graduated from the Woman's Medical College of Pennsylvania in 1867, under the supervision of Ann Preston, the first woman dean of the school. The Women’s Medical College was founded by Quaker abolitionists and temperance reformers in 1850. Initially named the Female Medical College of Pennsylvania, it was the first school to offer formal medical training to women with the culmination of an M.D. Cole's graduate thesis was titled The Eye and Its Appendages. In her senior year, Cole lived with fellow medical students Odelia Blinn and Martha E. Hutchings. Nearly thirty years later, Blinn wrote an article detailing how crossing the 'color line' in Philadelphia nearly derailed Cole's studies at the college and her plans for a medical career.

== Career ==
After earning her medical degree, Cole interned at Elizabeth Blackwell's New York Infirmary for Indigent Women and Children, where she was assigned to teach prenatal care and hygiene to women in tenements. Blackwell described Cole as "an intelligent young colored physician [who] carried on this work with tact and care."

Cole later briefly practiced medicine in South Carolina before returning to Philadelphia.

In 1873, Cole opened a Women's Directory Center with Dr. Charlotte Abbey, which provided medical and legal services to disadvantaged women and children. In January 1899, Cole was appointed superintendent of a home run by the Association for the Relief of Destitute Colored Women and Children in Washington, D.C. The association's 1899 annual report stated that Cole possessed "all the qualities essential to such a position-ability, energy, experience, tact." A subsequent report noted that:

Dr Cole herself has more than fulfilled the expectations of her friends. With a clear and comprehensive view of her whole field of action, she has carried out her plans with the good sense and vigor which are a part of her character, while her cheerful optimism, her determination to see the best in every situation and in every individual, have created around her an atmosphere of sunshine that adds to the happiness and well being of every member of the large family.

— Annual report of the National Association for the Relief of Destitute Colored Women and Children, https://www.loc.gov/item/91898495/

Cole practiced medicine for fifty years. In 2015, she was chosen as an Innovators Walk of Fame honoree by the University City Science Center, Philadelphia.

== Death ==
Cole died on August 14, 1922, at the age of 76. She is buried at Eden Cemetery in Collingdale, Pennsylvania. Few records or photos of her have survived.
