= Ted Dallas =

Secretary of Human Services of Pennsylvania
- In office June 2, 2015 – August 2017
- Governor: Tom Wolf
- Preceded by: Gary D. Alexander

Secretary of Human Resources of Maryland
- In office May 12, 2011 – January 15, 2015
- Governor: Martin O'Malley
- Preceded by: Brian L. Wilbon (Acting)
- Succeeded by: Sam Malhotra

Personal details
- Education: University of Pennsylvania; Temple University

Theodore "Ted" Dallas is the current President and COO of Merakey Inc., a non-profit organization that provides integrated services in the areas of mental health, addictive diseases, autism, education, intellectual/developmental disabilities, juvenile justice, and therapeutic family care to special needs children and adults in the United States. He was the former Pennsylvania Secretary of Human Services under Pennsylvania Governor Tom Wolf from June 2015 until August 2017. Previously, he served as Maryland Secretary of Human Resources from 2011 until 2015 in the administration of Maryland Governor Martin O'Malley.
