= West Manchester Township, Pennsylvania =

Township in Pennsylvania, US

Coordinates: 39°57′30″N 76°47′24″W

- Township
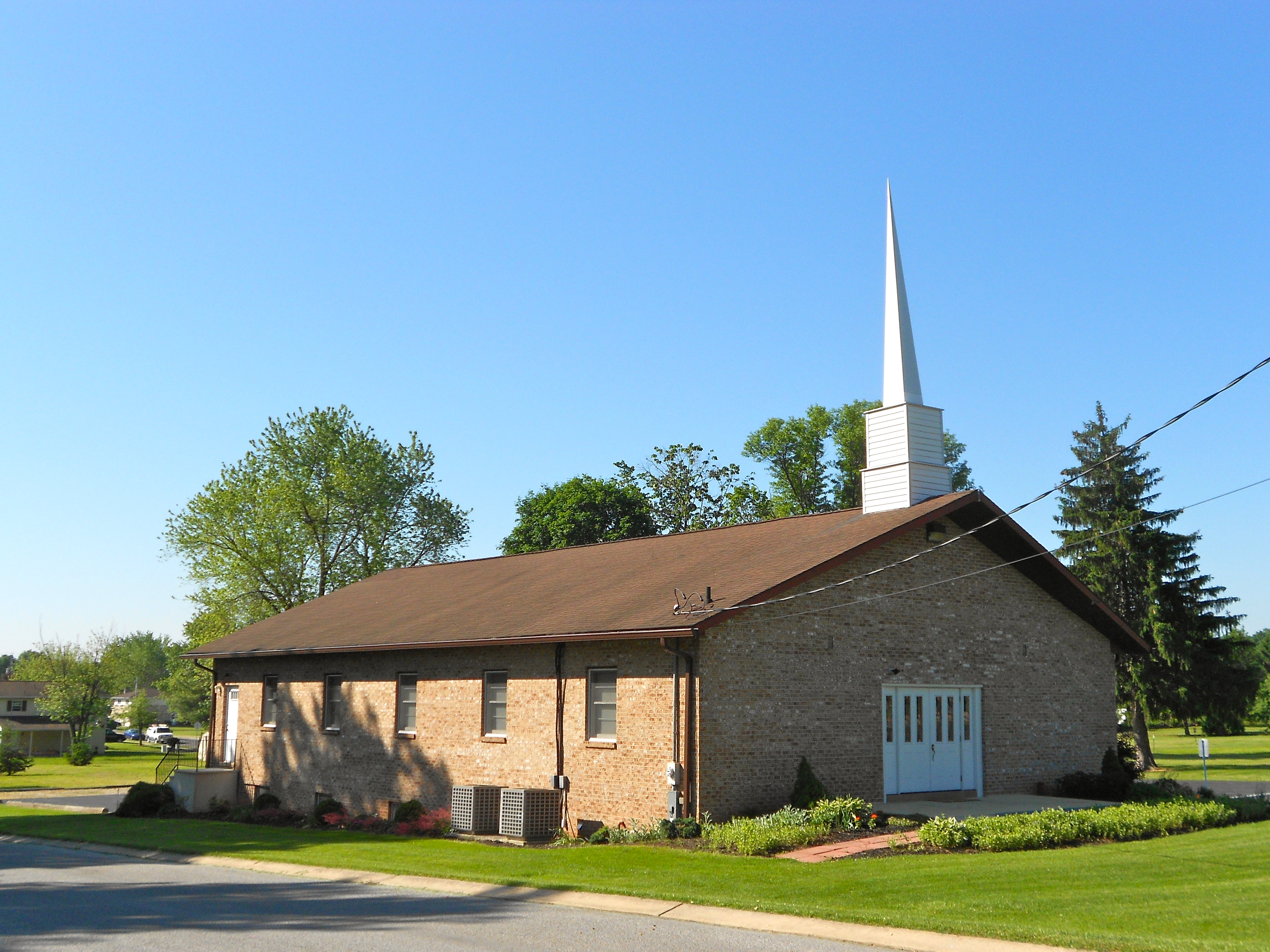
- God's Missionary Church in Shiloh

- Coat of arms

- Location in York County and the state of Pennsylvania.
- Country: United States
- State: Pennsylvania
- County: York
- Settled: 1735
- Incorporated: 1799

Government
  - Type: Board of Supervisors

Area
  - Total: 20.02 sq mi (51.85 km^{2})
  - Land: 19.94 sq mi (51.65 km^{2})
  - Water: 0.077 sq mi (0.20 km^{2})

Population (2020)
  - Total: 19,219 ▲
  - Estimate (2023): 19,207
  - Density: 946.3/sq mi (365.36/km^{2})
- Time zone: UTC-5 (Eastern (EST))
  - Summer (DST): UTC-4 (EDT)
- Area code: 717
- FIPS code: 42-133-83432
- Website: West Manchester Township official website

Historical population
Census	Pop.	Note	%±
2000	17,035		—
2010	18,894		10.9%
2020	19,219		1.7%
2023 (est.)	19,207		−0.1%
U.S. Decennial Census

West Manchester Township is a township in York County, Pennsylvania, United States. The population was 19,219 at the 2020 census.

== History ==
In 1799, West Manchester Township was formed from part of the western portions of Manchester Township. Farming, weaving, and milling were among the major occupations.

During the 1863 Gettysburg campaign of the American Civil War, the township was a main thoroughfare for two invading forces of the Confederate Army. On June 28, 1863, Major General Jubal A. Early's division marched east–west through the township en route to seize York. On July 1, J.E.B. Stuart's cavalry rode north–south through the township following the Battle of Hanover on their way to Dover. West Manchester Township farmers and residents lost horses and mules to the Confederates.

The Samuel Stoner Homestead was added to the National Register of Historic Places in 1976.

== Geography ==
According to the United States Census Bureau, the township has a total area of 20.1 square miles (52 km^{2}), of which 20.0 square miles (52 km^{2}) is land and 0.05% is water. The township is bordered by the city of York to the east, and it nearly encircles the borough of West York. It also contains the census-designated place of Shiloh.

== Demographics ==
As of the census of 2000, there were 17,035 people, 7,130 households, and 4,762 families residing in the township. The population density was 849.5 inhabitants per square mile (328.0/km^{2}). There were 7,417 housing units at an average density of 369.9 per square mile (142.8/km^{2}). The racial makeup of the township was 95.52% White, 1.68% African American, 0.08% Native American, 1.23% Asian, 0.02% Pacific Islander, 0.47% from other races, and 1.01% from two or more races. Hispanic or Latino of any race were 1.21% of the population.

There were 7,130 households, out of which 26.0% had children under the age of 18 living with them, 56.7% were married couples living together, 7.1% had a female householder with no husband present, and 33.2% were non-families. 27.8% of all households were made up of individuals, and 13.7% had someone living alone who was 65 years of age or older. The average household size was 2.31 and the average family size was 2.83.

In the township the population was spread out, with 20.1% under the age of 18, 5.9% from 18 to 24, 27.5% from 25 to 44, 25.6% from 45 to 64, and 20.9% who were 65 years of age or older. The median age was 43 years. For every 100 females, there were 90.9 males. For every 100 females age 18 and over, there were 87.1 males.

The median income for a household in the township was $45,212, and the median income for a family was $54,634. Males had a median income of $40,113 versus $24,787 for females. The per capita income for the township was $22,982. 5.2% of the population and 3.6% of families were below the poverty line. Out of the total population, 4.3% of those under the age of 18 and 7.6% of those 65 and older were living below the poverty line.

== Transportation ==
U.S. Route 30 passes through the township. Pennsylvania Route 116 ends at that route in this township.

== Education ==
West Manchester Township is served by the West York Area School District.

== Economy ==
Voith Hydro and BAE Systems have factories in West Manchester Township.

== Notable people ==
- James Alonzo Stahle, Civil War officer and post-war U.S. Congressman, born in West Manchester Township
- Eugene DePasquale, former State Representative and Auditor General
