= Sinking Spring =

Sinking Spring may refer to:

- Sinking Spring, Ohio, US
- Sinking Spring, Pennsylvania, US

== See also ==
- Sinking Springs Farms, a national historic district in York County, Pennsylvania, US
