= The Emigsville Band =

Community concert band based in Pennsylvania

- The official logo of the Emigsville Band

Background information
- Also known as: Acme Cornet Band of Emigsville
- Origin: Emigsville, Manchester Township, York County, Pennsylvania, United States
- Genre: Concert band
- Years active: Founded: November 8, 1872 Incorporated: June 24, 1878
- Website: theemigsvilleband.com

The Emigsville Band is a concert band based in Emigsville, York County, Pennsylvania. It was founded in 1872 as the Acme Cornet Band of Emigsville. It is one of the oldest community bands in York County that is still active today.

== History ==
The roots of the Emigsville Band can be traced to the late 19th century. The band was founded on November 8, 1872. Henry L. Dinderman served as the inaugural director. At the time, the band rehearsed in an old schoolhouse in the village of Emigsville. They would perform at various community events, parades, and local gatherings. The band was officially incorporated on June 24, 1878 as the "Emigsville Cornet Band."

The band initially consisted of 16 men who were employed with the Acme Wagon Works company. During the Industrial Revolution, it was common for employers to have their employees play in a part of an eponymous community band.

After a brief hiatus, the band reorganized on September 6, 1906 with 18 charter members. During this period, the band met in the boiler room of the Acme Wagon Works, formerly known as the Acme Wagon Company.

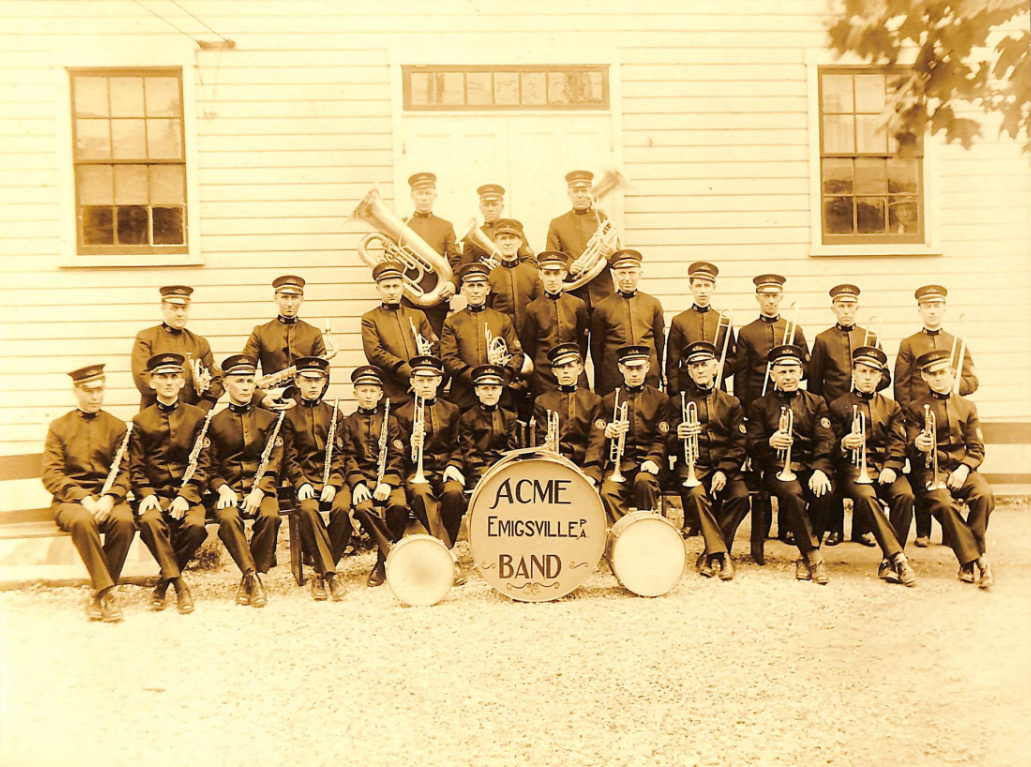
The Emigsville Band photographed circa 1920, shortly after the establishment of their Band Hall.

In 1918, the band purchased lumber from a company that had gone out of business in York. Hauling the wood by horse-drawn wagon, the band members built the Band Hall in its current location. The total cost of this effort was $1,800.

The band has historically used its Band Hall to host a variety of community events. In the 1910's, the band hosted a series of fairs each year. In the 1930's, the band performed at Sunday school picnics. They also hosted an annual business show and Halloween show in the hall. From the 1930's to the 1960's, the band held annual carnivals and ox roasts for the residents of Emigsville in the summer months. In the fall, the band hosted turkey suppers in conjunction with the Ladies Auxiliary group. In addition, the band would perform concerts in the venue.

From the early 2000's to the present day, the band frequently performs at retirement communities. They also continue to perform at church picnics, community events, parades, and fairs.

== Current band ==
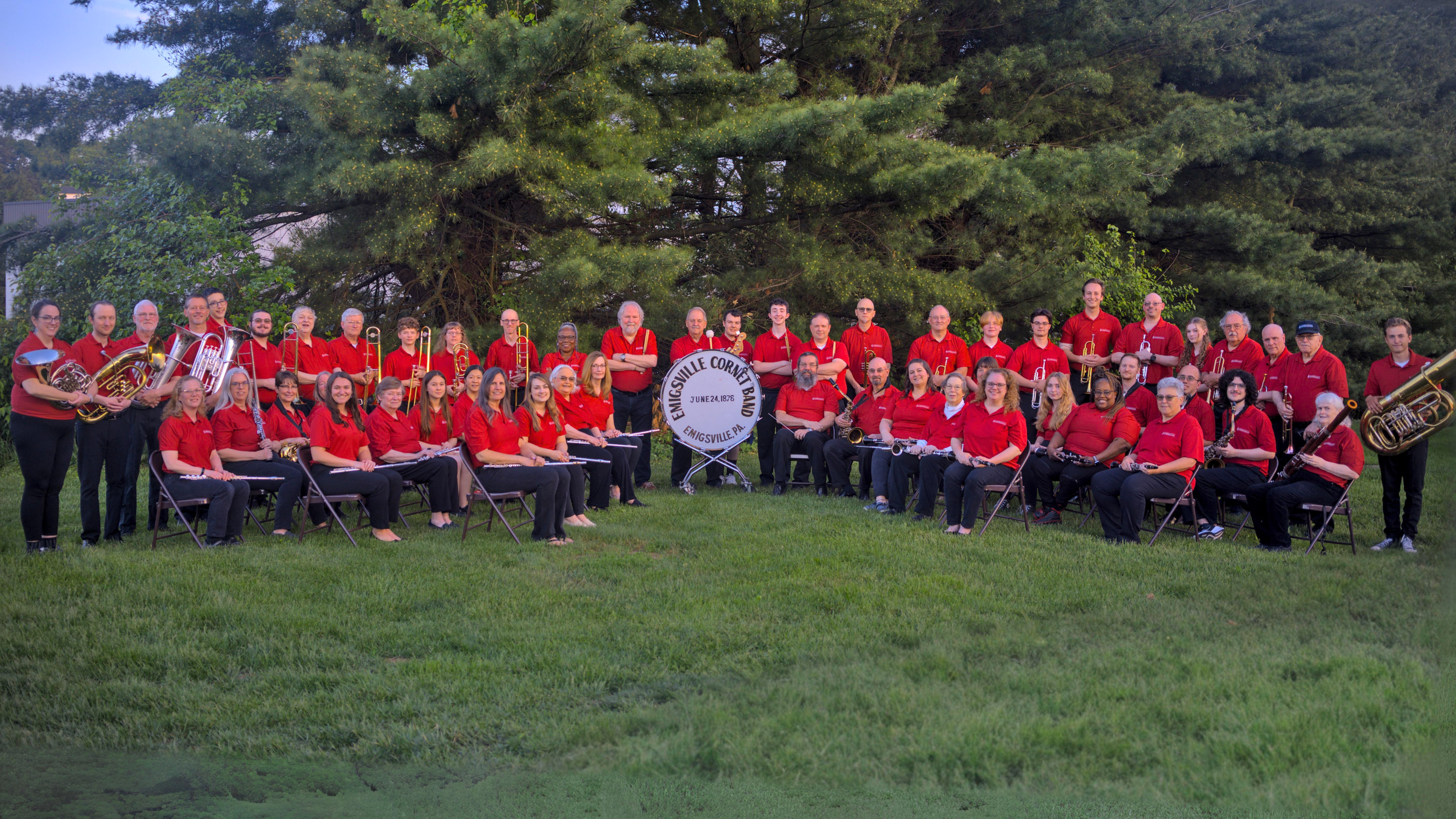
The Emigsville Band photographed on May 13, 2024 outside of their Band Hall.

Today, the band has a membership of about 80 volunteer instrumentalists, ranging from teenagers to individuals in their 80's and 90's. The band maintains a flexible membership policy by welcoming musicians of all ages and musical proficiencies.

The band rehearses every Monday evening at its Band Hall from February through May. The regular concert season typically runs from May to the end of October. After the annual banquet on the first Monday of November, rehearsals and performances resume for the holiday concert series, which concludes around Christmas.

On August 12, 2026, the band became a member of the Association of Concert Bands.

== Band Hall ==
The Emigsville Band owns their Band Hall located in the town of Emigsville. This building has served as the rehearsal space for the band since it was moved to its current location in 1918. It officially opened on Thanksgiving Day in 1918, at which time the band had 22 members.

The band rents the Band Hall out to a tenant to offset costs. Currently, R.O.C.K. Ministries rents the building while maintaining a contractual obligation to allow the band to practice on Monday evenings.

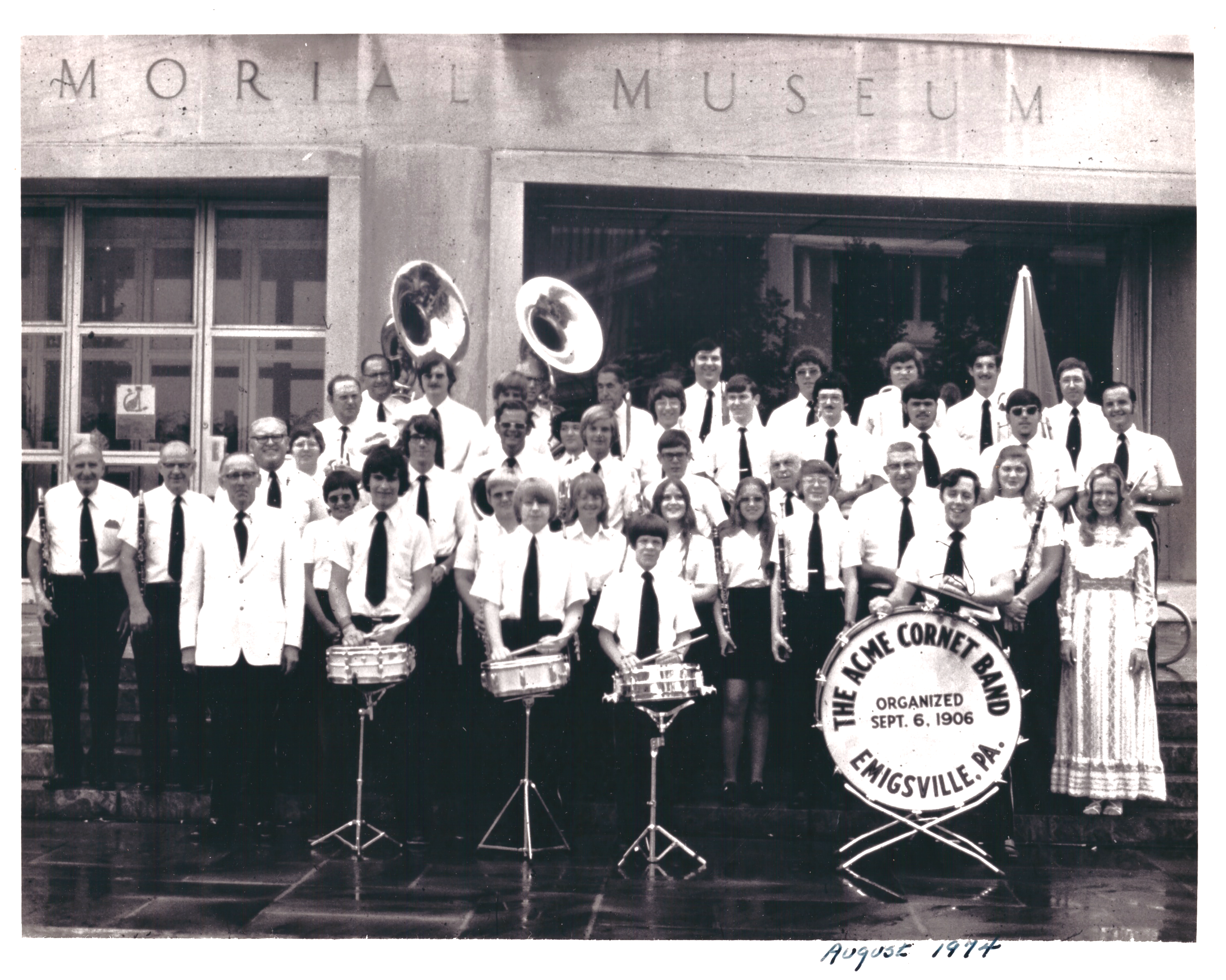
The Emigsville Band photographed at their performance on September 1, 1974 at the William Penn Memorial Museum in Harrisburg, Pennsylvania.

== Musical repertoire ==
The Emigsville Band's musical repertoire includes American patriotic music, sacred/religious music, contemporary selections like marches, show tunes, medleys, and popular songs.

== Traditions ==
From the band's incorporation in 1878 until the COVID-19 pandemic, the band had an annual tradition of performing Christmas carols on Christmas Day for the residents of the village of Emigsville. After the pandemic, the tradition transitioned into providing free community Christmas concerts in the Band Hall. This was done in an effort to accommodate a greater audience as well as a greater turnout of band members. In 2025, due to the growing popularity of the annual Christmas concert in Emigsville, the band moved the concert to the Alert Fire Hall.

== Current leadership ==
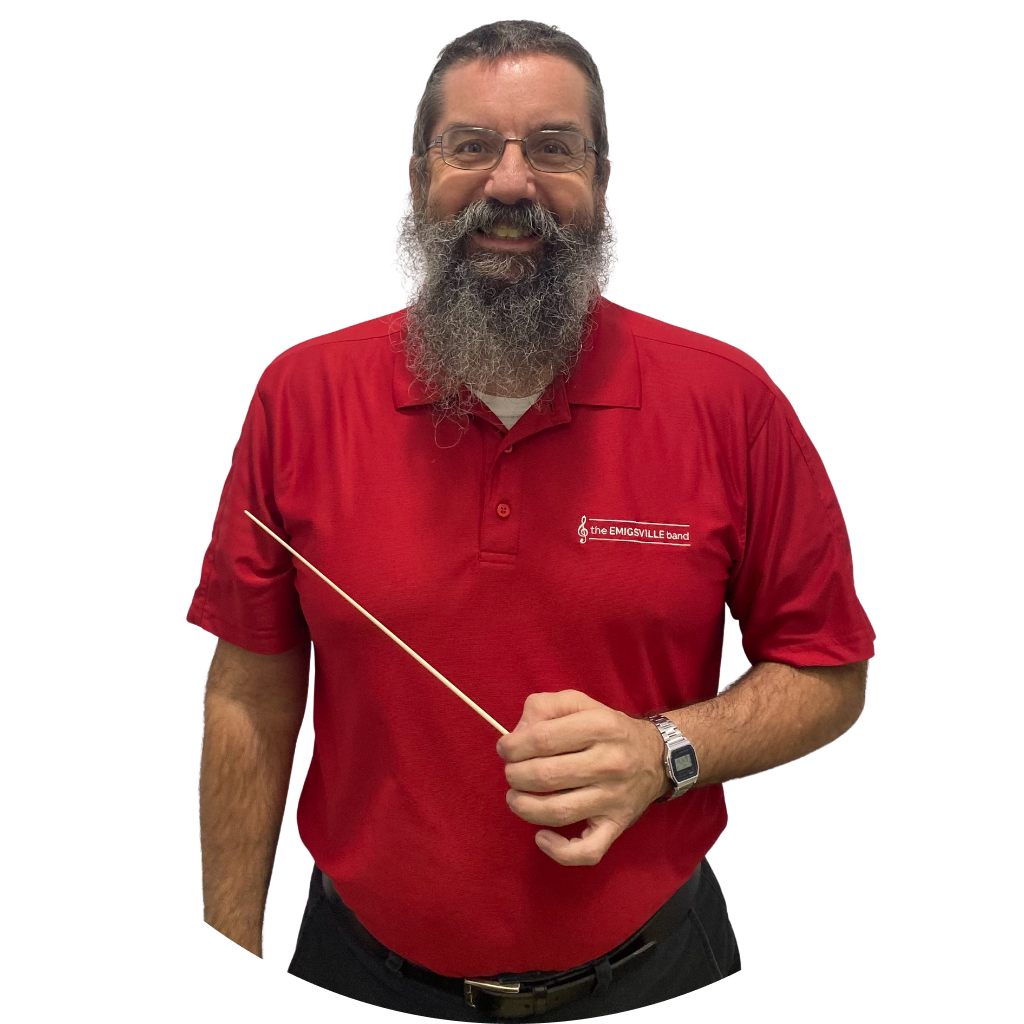
Jim Rowlands, the current director of the Emigsville Band.

At its annual banquet and business meeting on the first Monday of November, the band elects its officer board. The 2027 officer board is as follows:

Position	Name
President	Douglas Kirk
Vice President	Matthew Malehorn
Director	Jim Rowlands
Assistant Director	Michael Kirk
Business Manager	Barry Boyer
Treasurer	Curtis Crane
Secretary	Jennifer Hastings
Trustees	Keith Christian, Steve Bowman, Jill Anderson

There are also three administrative roles in the band, per the by-laws:

Position	Name
Public Relations Chair	Michael Kirk
Librarian	Aimee Conley
Merit/"Points" Secretary	Paula Nelson

== Awards and nominations ==
Award	Year	Category	Result
Central Pennsylvania Music Hall of Fame	2024	Best Variety/Dance Band	Nominated

== Discography ==
The band has released several albums:

Year	Title
1974	Live at the William Penn Memorial Museum
2006	The Best of 2006
2007	The Best of 2007
2008	The Best of 2008
2009	The Best of 2009
2022	The Best of 2022
2023	The Best of 2023
2024	50th Anniversary Concert: The State Museum of Pennsylvania
2025	Christmas in the Village
2026	America250: A Tribute to Our Country
