= John A. Dempwolf =

American architect

- Born: October 3, 1848; Brunswick, Germany
- Died: December 24, 1926 (aged 78); York, Pennsylvania
- Occupation: Architect
- Buildings: York Central Market
- Projects: Pennsylvania State Lunatic Hospital

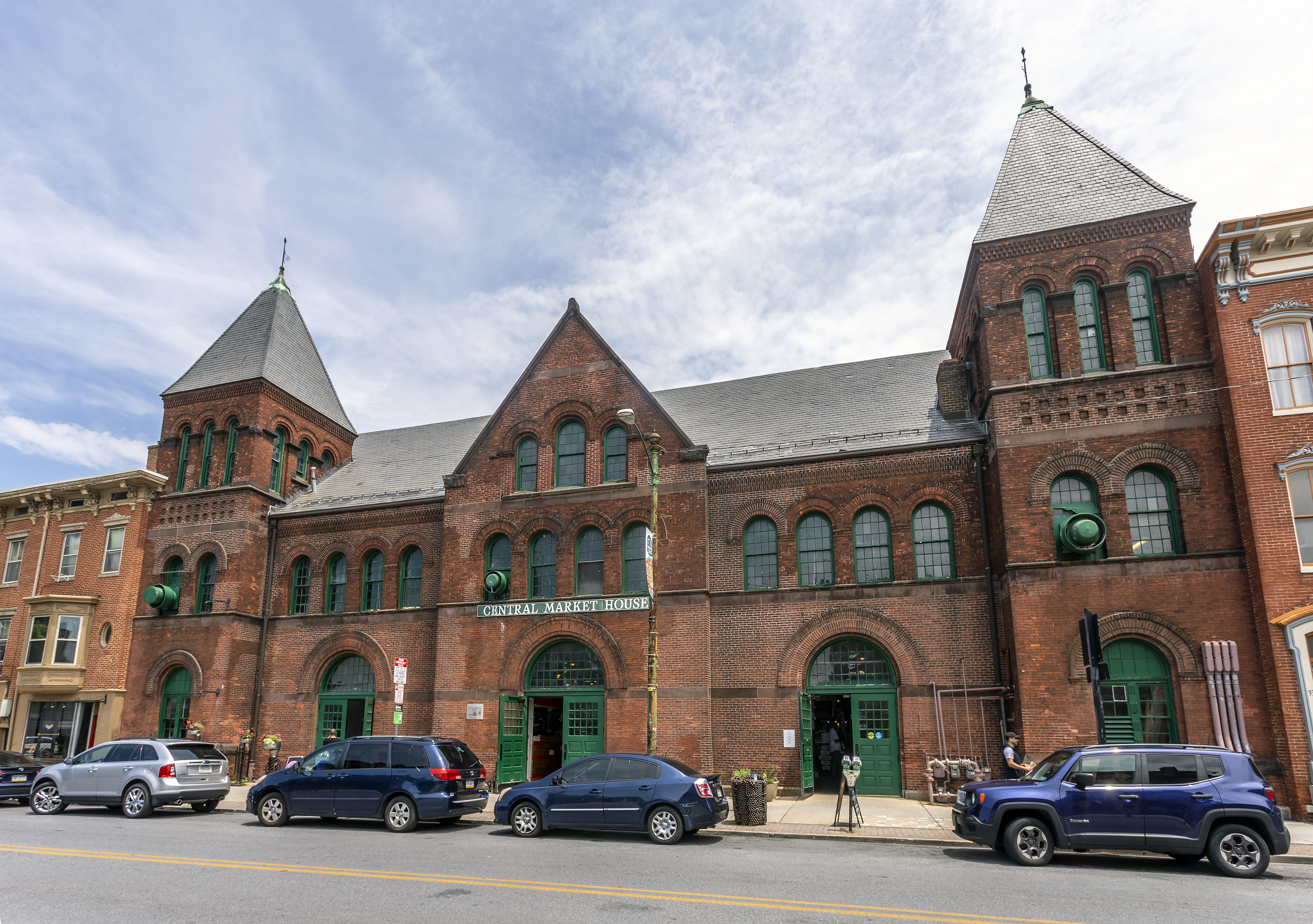
The York Central Market, designed by John A. Dempwolf and built in 1888.

John A. Dempwolf (1848–1926) was a German-born American architect practicing in York, Pennsylvania from 1876 until his death in 1926. In association with his brother Reinhardt Dempwolf and son Frederick G. Dempwolf, he was responsible for the design of some five hundred buildings in and around Pennsylvania.

== Life and career ==
John Augustus Dempwolf was born October 3, 1848, in Brunswick, Germany, to Charles Dempwolf, a millwright, and Wilhelmina (Beaker) Dempwolf. He was the eldest of twelve children. In 1867 the family immigrated to the United States, settling in York. He was apprenticed to local carpenter William Gotwalt to learn the trade and worked in a planing mill as a drafter. In 1871 he relocated to New York City, where he enrolled in the night school of Cooper Union. After graduating in 1873 he worked as a construction superintendent in Boston and for Stephen Decatur Button in Philadelphia. In 1876 he returned to York, where he opened his own office as an architect. In 1884 he was joined by his younger brother Reinhardt Dempwolf as a drafter. Recognizing his brother's talent for design, at his encouragement Reinhardt traveled to Paris, where he was admitted to the École des Beaux-Arts in 1886. In Paris he was a student of Julien Guadet, winner of the Prix de Rome in 1864. He returned to his brother in York in 1890, and remained his associate for the remainder of his life. In 1918 they were joined by Frederick G. Dempwolf, son of John. Like his uncle, Frederick had been educated at the Beaux-Arts in Paris. John A. Dempwolf died in 1926, after which Frederick succeeded to the practice, with Reinhardt as associate. Reinhardt Dempwolf retired in 1930, and died in 1944. Frederick practiced under his own name until his retirement in the 1960s, and died in 1970.

All three Dempwolfs were involved in the American Institute of Architects. John A. Dempwolf joined in 1901, and was made a Fellow in 1910. Reinhardt Dempwolf joined in 1909, and was made a Fellow in 1932. Frederick G. Dempwolf joined in 1921. John A. Dempwolf was a chief mover behind the establishment of the Southern Pennsylvania Chapter of the AIA in 1909, now the Central Pennsylvania Chapter. All three served as chapter president, in 1912–13, 1919–20 and 1930–32, respectively. In 1923 John A. Dempwolf was appointed to the State Art Commission of Pennsylvania, and became its chair in 1926.

== Personal life ==
Dempwolf was married in 1879 to Sallie Greiman of York, and they had ten children. He died December 24, 1926, in York at the age of 78.

== Legacy ==
Although John A. Dempwolf was head of the firm, York architect Mark D. Shermeyer has argued that during his lifetime, Reinhardt Dempwolf, with his European education, was the chief designer of many of the firm's works. During John A. Dempwolf's lifetime, his office is documented as having designed at least 500 buildings in Pennsylvania, Maryland and elsewhere. Several of these have been listed on the United States National Register of Historic Places, and others contribute to listed historic districts. Major works included buildings at Gettysburg College and the Harrisburg State Hospital.

The Dempwolf Architectural Drawings collection is in the possession of the York County History Center.

== Selected works ==
- 1876 Saint Johns Lutheran Church York, Pennsylvania
- 1886: York Collegiate Institute, York, Pennsylvania, demolished in 1969.
- 1888: York Central Market, York, Pennsylvania, listed on the National Register of Historic Places in 1978.
- 1889–1890: Stevens School, York, Pennsylvania, listed on the National Register of Historic Places in 1986.
- 1893–1896: The Nook, Spring Garden Township, Pennsylvania, listed on the National Register of Historic Places in 1982.
- 1893–1912: Pennsylvania State Lunatic Hospital, Harrisburg, Pennsylvania, listed on the National Register of Historic Places in 1986.
- 1894: Saint Mary's Lutheran Church Silver Run, Maryland
- Sinking Springs Farms, Manchester Township, Pennsylvania, listed on the National Register of Historic Places in 2000.
- 1900: Diamond Silk Mill, Springettsbury Township, Pennsylvania, listed on the National Register of Historic Places in 1992.

Contributing buildings to the following

- Fairmount Historic District, York, Pennsylvania, listed on the National Register of Historic Places in 1999.
- Hanover Historic District, Hanover, Pennsylvania, listed on the National Register of Historic Places in 1997.
- Springdale Historic District, York, Pennsylvania, listed on the National Register of Historic Places in 2001.
- York Historic District, York, Pennsylvania, listed on the National Register of Historic Places in 1979, 2008. Including the Bon-Ton Building, Colonial Hotel, Fluhrer Building, Hahn Home, Rosenmiller Building, Union Lutheran Church, York County Courthouse, and York National Bank.
