= Emigsville, Pennsylvania =

Unincorporated place in Pennsylvania, US

Emigsville
- Census-designated place
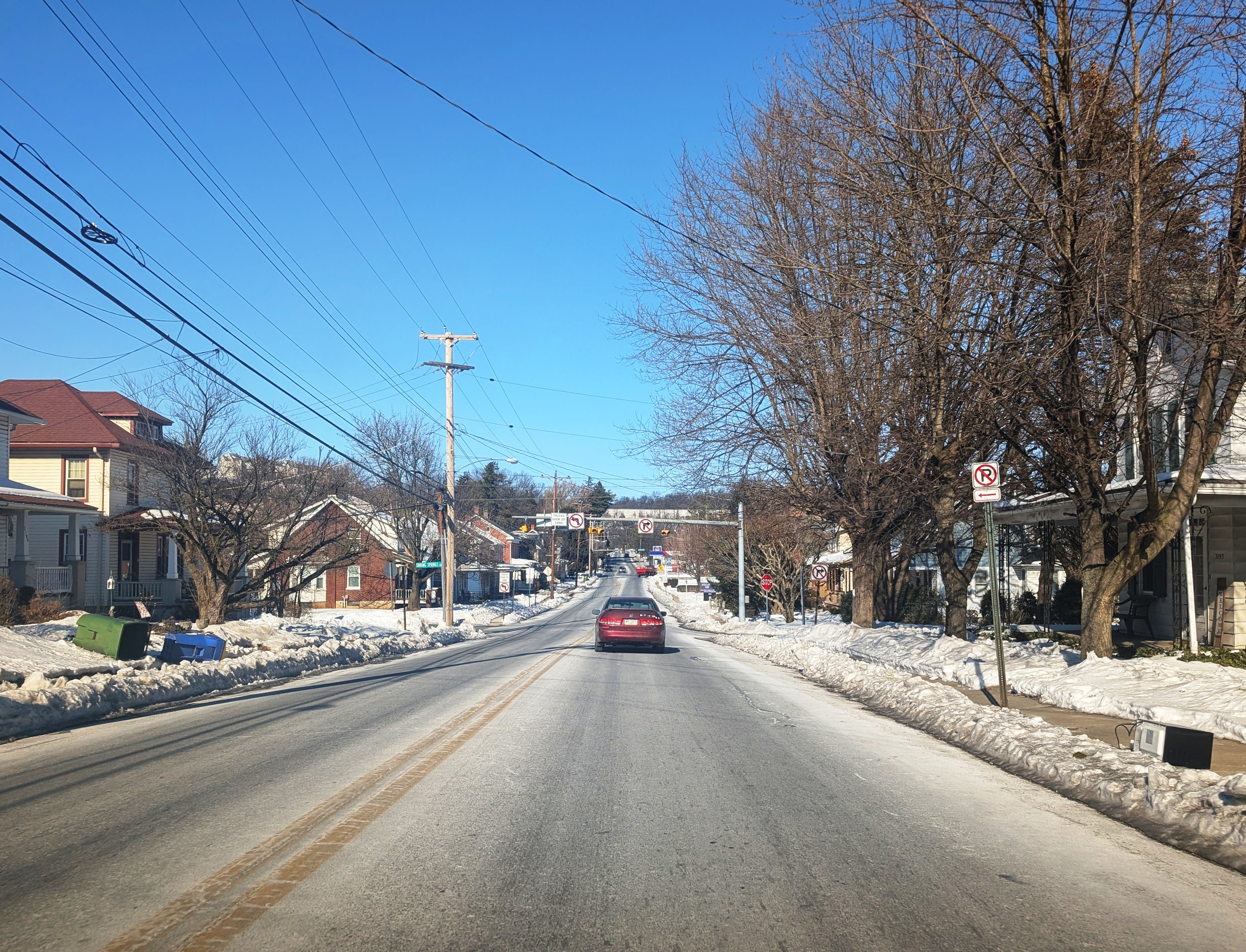
- PA 181 in Emigsville

- Location in York County and the U.S. state of Pennsylvania.
- Coordinates: 40°00′12″N 76°43′51″W
- Country: United States
- State: Pennsylvania
- County: York
- Township: Manchester

Area
  - Total: 1.37 sq mi (3.56 km^{2})
  - Land: 1.37 sq mi (3.55 km^{2})
  - Water: 0 sq mi (0.00 km^{2})
- Elevation: 423 ft (129 m)

Population (2020)
  - Total: 3,563
  - Density: 2,597.3/sq mi (1,002.82/km^{2})
- Time zone: UTC-5 (Eastern (EST))
  - Summer (DST): UTC-4 (EDT)
- ZIP code: 17318
- Area code: 717
- FIPS code: 42-23560
- GNIS feature ID: 2389042

Emigsville is a census-designated place (CDP) in York County, Pennsylvania, United States. The population was 3,563 at the 2020 census.

== History ==
The Emig Mansion was listed on the National Register of Historic Places in 1984.

Emigsville is home to the Emigsville Band, formerly known as the Acme Cornet Band of Emigsville, PA. The organization traces its roots to 1872 when it was founded as a company band for the Acme Wagon Works Company. The band owns its Band Hall located at 3175 North George Street. It is one of a few remaining community concert bands in the county.

== Geography ==
Emigsville is located in Manchester Township just north of the city of York.

According to the United States Census Bureau, the CDP has a total area of 1.2 square miles (3.1 km^{2}), all land.

== Demographics ==
Historical population
Census	Pop.	Note	%±
2020	3,563		—
U.S. Decennial Census

=== 2020 census ===
As of the 2020 census, Emigsville had a population of 3,563. The median age was 41.1 years. 20.9% of residents were under the age of 18 and 17.6% of residents were 65 years of age or older. For every 100 females there were 93.0 males, and for every 100 females age 18 and over there were 89.3 males age 18 and over.

100.0% of residents lived in urban areas, while 0.0% lived in rural areas.

There were 1,478 households in Emigsville, of which 29.7% had children under the age of 18 living in them. Of all households, 45.5% were married-couple households, 15.0% were households with a male householder and no spouse or partner present, and 29.7% were households with a female householder and no spouse or partner present. About 27.8% of all households were made up of individuals and 13.6% had someone living alone who was 65 years of age or older.

There were 1,523 housing units, of which 3.0% were vacant. The homeowner vacancy rate was 1.3% and the rental vacancy rate was 5.9%.

Racial composition as of the 2020 census
Race	Number	Percent
White	2,808	78.8%
Black or African American	299	8.4%
American Indian and Alaska Native	10	0.3%
Asian	68	1.9%
Native Hawaiian and Other Pacific Islander	0	0.0%
Some other race	160	4.5%
Two or more races	218	6.1%
Hispanic or Latino (of any race)	331	9.3%

=== 2000 census ===
At the 2000 census there were 2,467 people, 1,045 households, and 731 families living in the CDP. The population density was 2,067.9 inhabitants per square mile (798.4/km^{2}). There were 1,086 housing units at an average density of 910.3 per square mile (351.5/km^{2}). The racial makeup of the CDP was 93.88% White, 2.23% Black, 0.16% Native American, 1.58% Asian, 0.04% Pacific Islander, 1.22% from other races, and 0.89% from two or more races. Hispanic or Latino of any race were 2.03%.

Of the 1,045 households 27.4% had children under the age of 18 living with them, 58.5% were married couples living together, 7.8% had a female householder with no husband present, and 30.0% were non-families. 23.5% of households were one person and 10.0% were one person aged 65 or older. The average household size was 2.36 and the average family size was 2.77.

The age distribution was 21.0% under the age of 18, 6.8% from 18 to 24, 29.6% from 25 to 44, 22.5% from 45 to 64, and 20.1% 65 or older. The median age was 40 years. For every 100 females, there were 92.9 males. For every 100 females age 18 and over, there were 88.9 males.

The median household income was $44,116 and the median family income was $47,420. Males had a median income of $37,370 versus $24,375 for females. The per capita income for the CDP was $19,740. About 2.0% of families and 3.1% of the population were below the poverty line, including none of those under age 18 and 8.3% of those age 65 or over.

== Education ==
- Motorcycle Technology Center
