= Emig Mansion =

Historic house in Pennsylvania, United States

- U.S. National Register of Historic Places
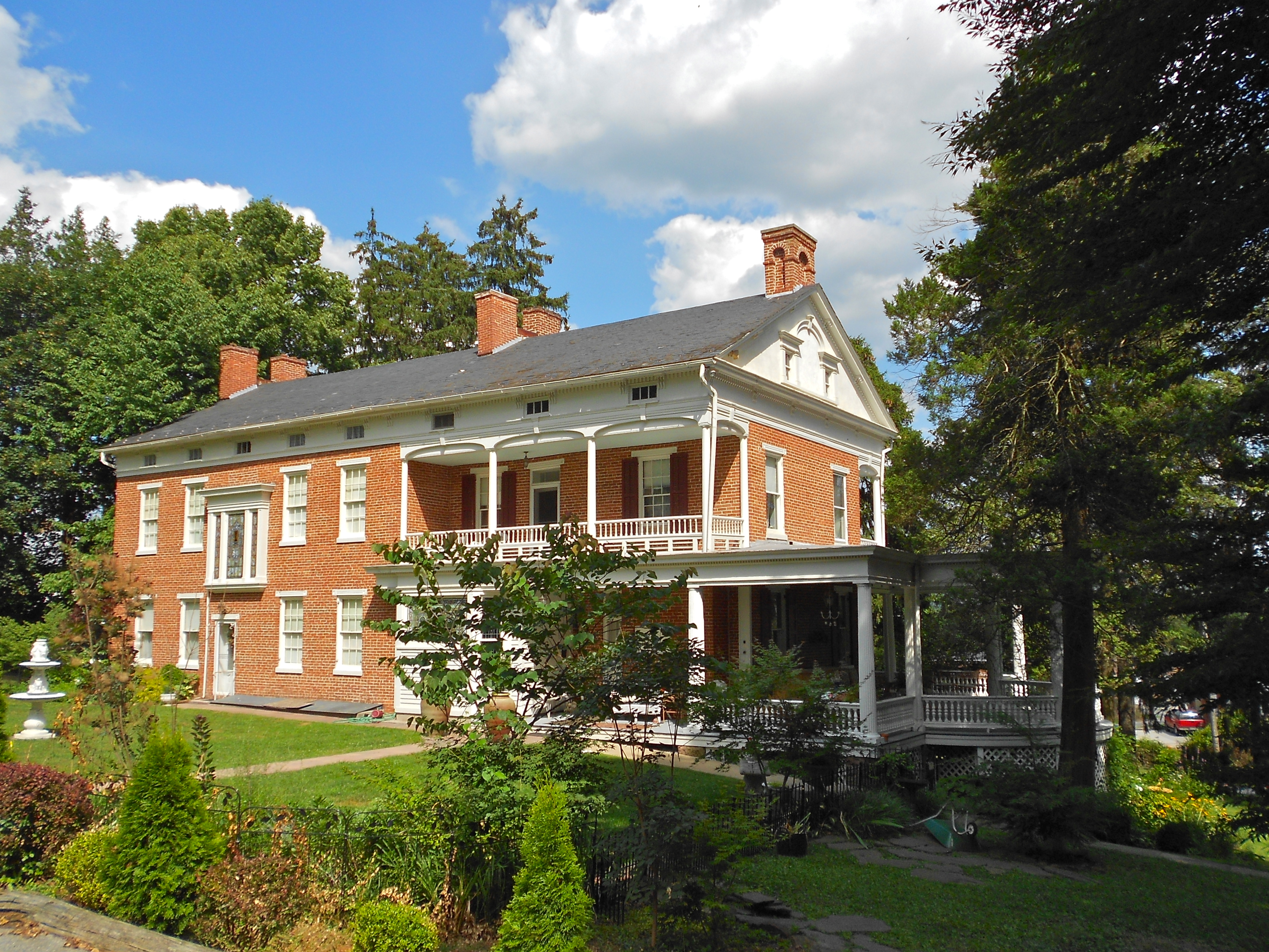

- Location within Pennsylvania Location within the United States
- Location: 3342 N. George St. in Emigsville, Manchester Township, Pennsylvania
- Coordinates: 40°1′11″N 76°43′0″W
- Area: 2.1 acres (0.85 ha)
- Built: c. 1810
- NRHP reference No.: 84003586
- Added to NRHP: September 7, 1984

Emig Mansion is a historic home located at Emigsville, Manchester Township, York County, Pennsylvania, US. It was built in about 1810 and is a 2½-story, Georgian-style brick dwelling. It measures about 66 feet long by 30 feet wide. It is five bays wide and two bays deep and has a slate-covered gable roof. A large wing was added in about 1885. The wing is four bays by two bays and integral porches. The house was remodeled in the early 20th century to add a large two-story bay window and porches. The front porch has Doric order columns and the porch on the south facade is semi-circular.

The house is open as a bed and breakfast and meeting center.

It was added to the National Register of Historic Places in 1984.
