= Harrisburg State Hospital =

- Pennsylvania State Lunatic Hospital
- U.S. National Register of Historic Places
- Pennsylvania state historical marker
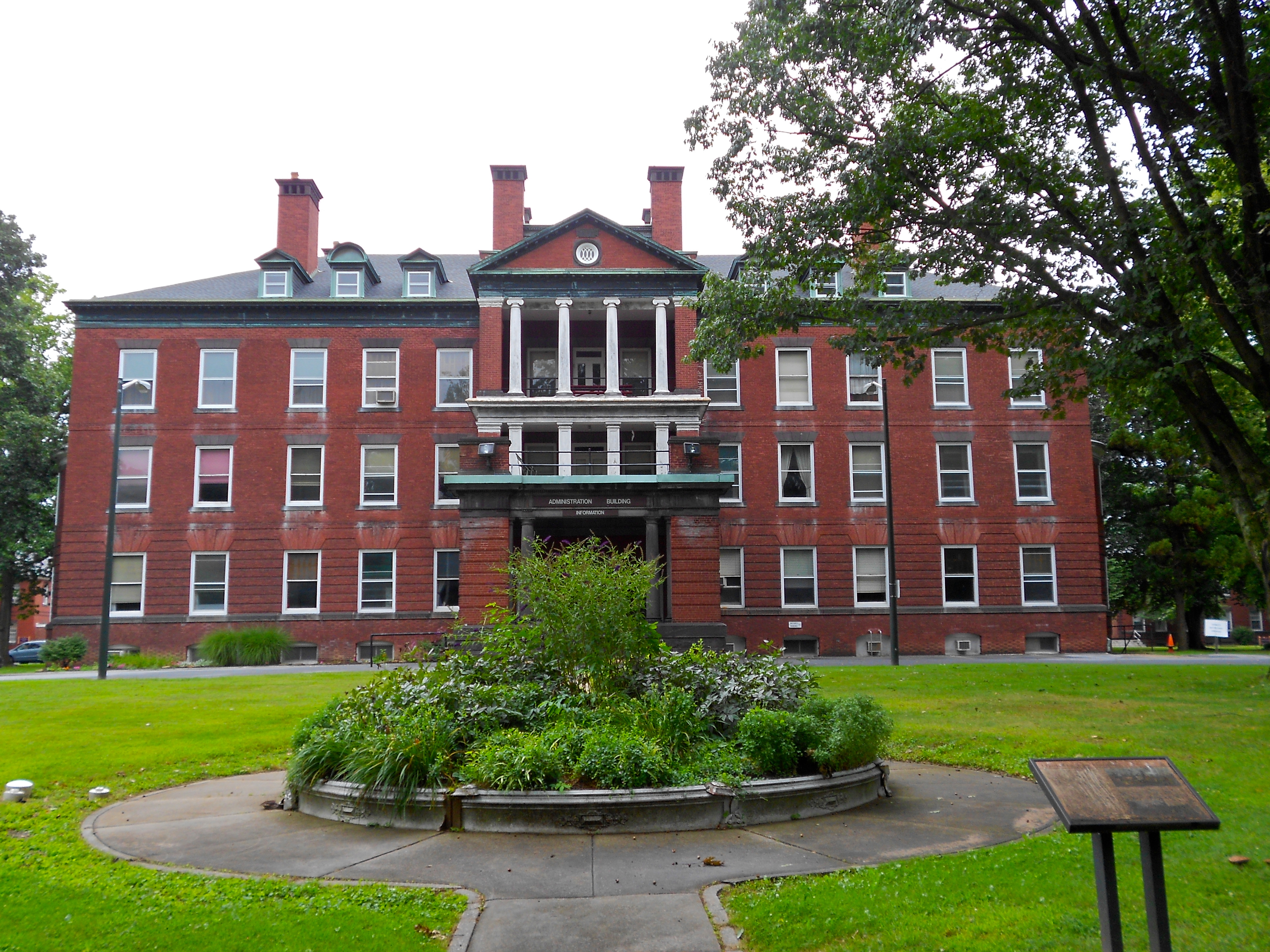
- Harrisburg State Hospital Administration Building, May 2007

- Location within Pennsylvania Location within the United States
- Location: Cameron St., Harrisburg, Pennsylvania
- Coordinates: 40°16′59″N 76°52′24″W
- Area: 183 acres (74 ha)
- Built: 1851, 1935
- Architect: John Haviland, John A. Dempwolf and Addison Hutton
- Architectural style: Classical Revival
- NRHP reference No.: 86000057

Significant dates
- Added to NRHP: January 8, 1986
- Designated PHMC: October 7, 1987

Harrisburg State Hospital, formerly known from 1851 to 1937 as Pennsylvania State Lunatic Hospital, in Harrisburg, Pennsylvania, was Pennsylvania's first public facility to house the mentally ill and disabled. Its campus is located on Cameron Street and Arsenal Boulevard, and operated as a mental hospital until 2006.

== History ==
The Harrisburg State Hospital was created as the Pennsylvania State Lunatic Hospital and Union Asylum for the Insane in 1845 to provide care for mentally ill persons throughout the Commonwealth of Pennsylvania.

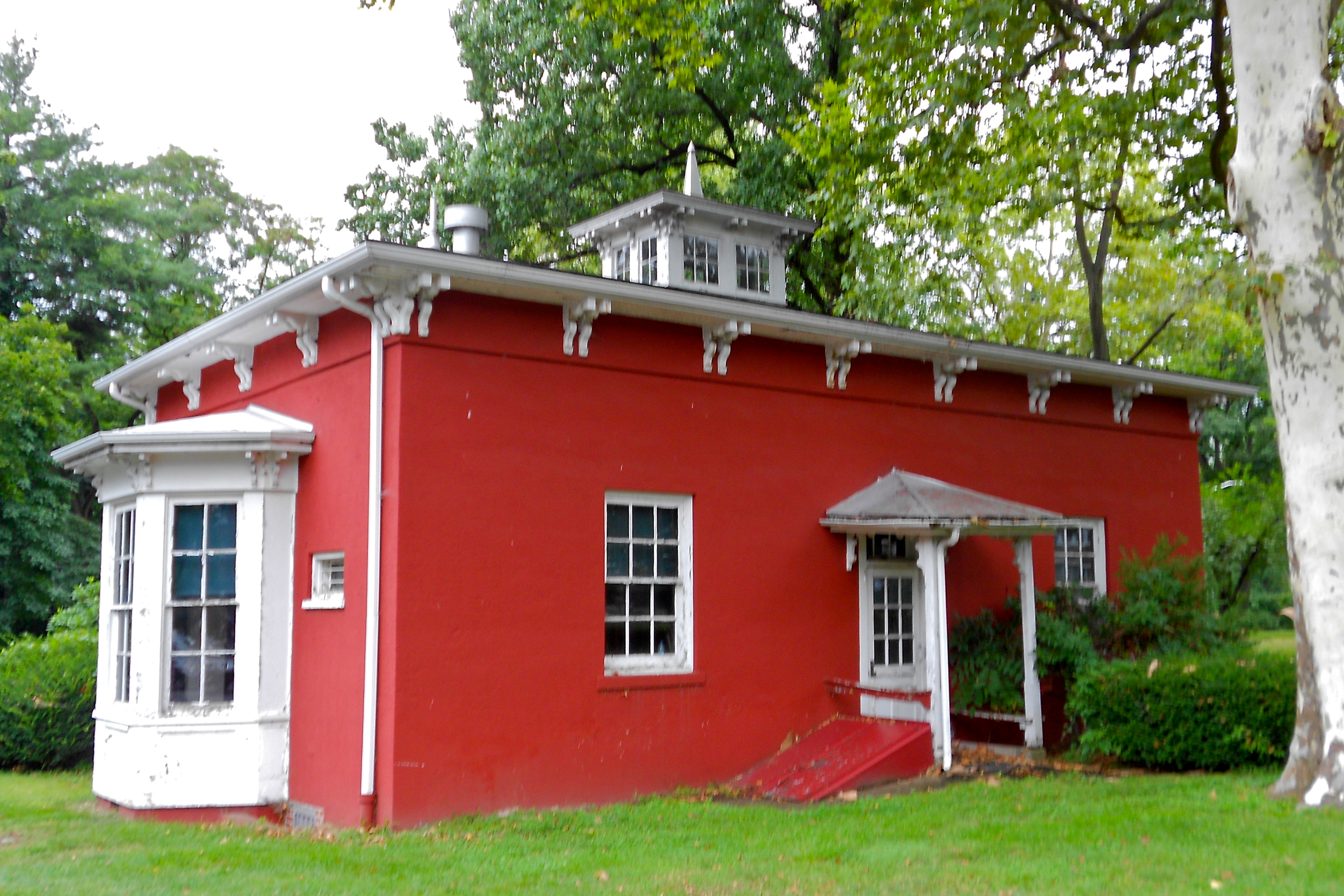
The Dix Museum (now closed) on the grounds

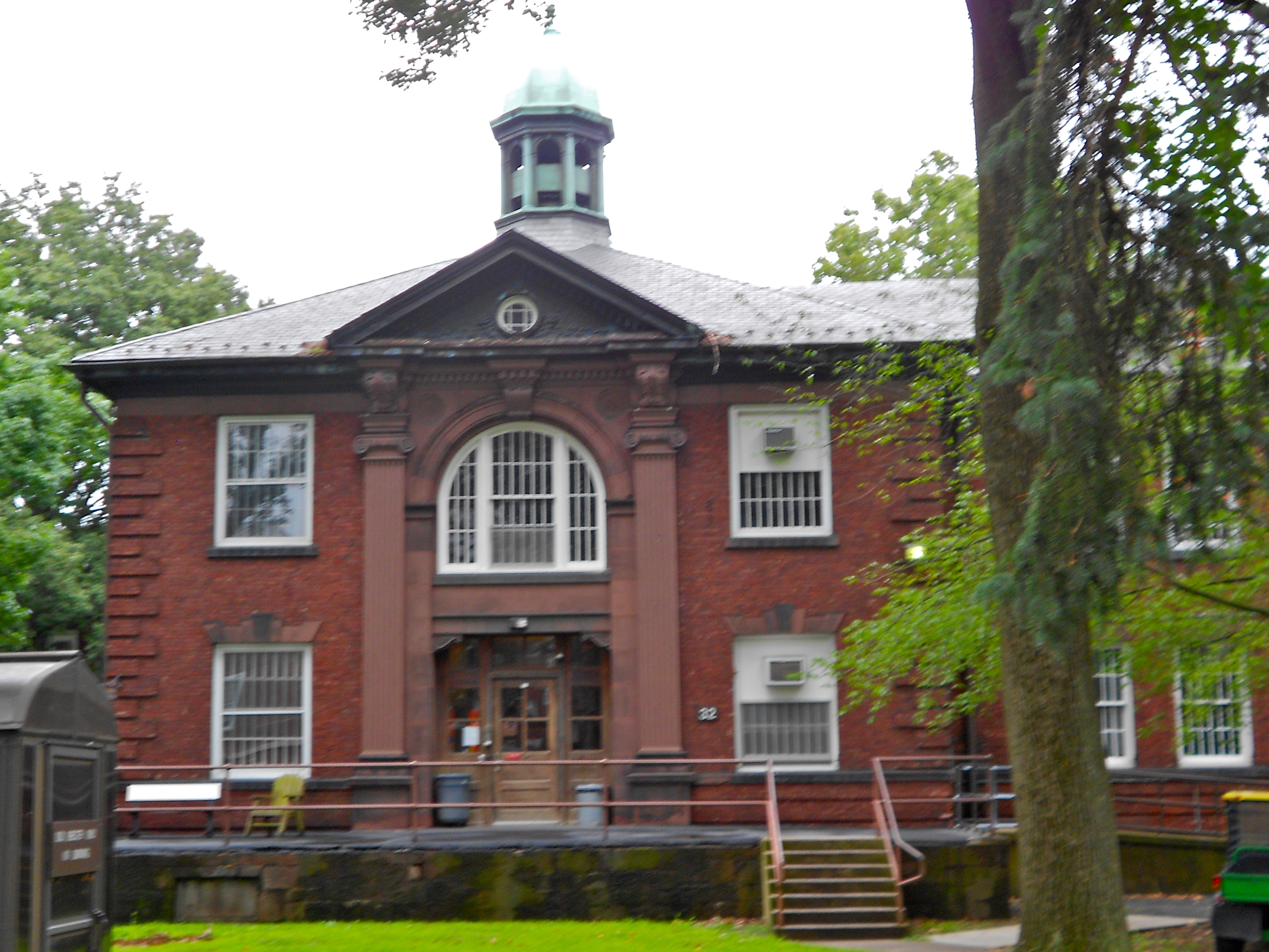
The Beechmont Building

The hospital was the result of the successful lobbying efforts of 19th century social reformer, Dorothea Dix. A nine-member board of trustees was empowered to appoint a superintendent, purchase land, and construct facilities near Harrisburg. This board of trustees received no compensation for their work. In 1848, the name of the future hospital was changed to the Pennsylvania State Lunatic Hospital when $50,000 was appropriated to begin construction. In 1851, construction of the Main Building designed by John Haviland was completed, which was initially the only building for the hospital, housing the administration, staff, and patients. It was designed following the Kirkbride Plan, which was a very popular building style during the late 19th century. The original capacity of the building was 250 patients, but was later expanded with the removal of dining rooms and the addition of the North and South Branch Buildings. Patients from all parts of the state would be accepted at the hospital, at the expense of the counties that they belonged; or, if able they would pay for themselves at a cost of $2.50 per week. This cost included board and medical attention.

A 130-acre (53 ha) farm was located adjacent to the hospital and provided work therapy for the patients and also enabled the hospital to be self-supporting, by growing its own food, and raising its own livestock. When the first patient was admitted on October 6, 1851, every poor district was charged a $2.00 weekly maintenance fee for the care of each indigent patient. The boarding charges for private patients were scheduled to vary between $3.00 and $10.00 based upon ability to pay. In 1869, the Board of Public Charities was created to inspect all public and voluntary charitable institutions in the Commonwealth and to report to the legislature with recommendations concerning their operation. For four decades this unpaid Board and its small staff had no authority to correct the conditions it found within state institutions. Nonetheless, by persuasion and publicity they were able to improve the quality of care in public institutions. A major objective was the removal of the insane from almshouses to the Pennsylvania State Lunatic Hospital and other state hospitals. A Committee on Lunacy was created within the Board of Public Charities in 1883 to oversee the operations of these mental institutions.

The early 20th century was a time of extensive change for Harrisburg State Hospital. The Main Building had become outdated and was in need of replacement. Between the years 1893 and 1912, the hospital was rebuilt following the "Cottage Plan", which became popular at the beginning of the 20th century. At its peak, the hospital consumed over 1,000 acres (400 ha) and included more than 70 buildings. Designed and constructed by Pennsylvania architects Addison Hutton and John A. Dempwolf, the campus and buildings were meant to represent an Italianate window. The buildings on the male and female sides of the campus mirrored each other until the addition of new buildings in the 1930s.

In 1921, the name of the hospital was changed to the Harrisburg State Hospital. Also that year, the Board of Public Charities was abolished and the Department of Public Welfare was created to administer all state hospitals. With the completion of the new "Cottage Plan" buildings, the hospital had grown considerably larger. Its patient capacity was 2,019, but at one time it held as many as 2,441 with 437 on parole. The hospital was self-sufficient, with its own farm, power plant, and stores; it became known as the "City on the Hill". During wartime there was a 50% shortage of attendants, at the lowest level of employment there were as few as one nurse to 166 patients. In June 1945, only 26 of the 92 authorized positions on the male side were filled. The manpower shortage resulted in widespread curtailment of services to both the public and patients.

Up until 1955, certain administrative responsibilities, such as the selection of the hospital Superintendent and the enactment of rules and regulations governing the hospital were vested in the Board of Trustees of the Harrisburg State Hospital. In 1955 an amendment to the Administrative Code authorized the Department of Public Welfare to assume administrative responsibilities for the Harrisburg State Hospital, relegating its Board of Trustees to specific advisory duties. This act also provided for the appointment of a Commissioner of Mental Health in the Department of Public Welfare who assumed overall responsibility for Pennsylvania's mental health program.

Like other institutions, Harrisburg State Hospital's patient population began to fall in the late 20th century. This was due to new medicines being developed and finally deinstitutionalization. The hospital was finally closed on January 27, 2006. Currently, the hospital sits on a 295-acre (119 ha) campus with stately buildings in a country setting, in Dauphin County, with a majority of its campus in Susquehanna Township. There are over fifty buildings still located on the campus. The former hospital facility now provides office and storage space for many state agencies. In 2017, the appraised worth of the campus was $2 Million. As of 2019, the campus cost $5 Million annually to maintain, and is up for sale to developers.

The hospital was listed on the National Register of Historic Places in 1986.

Many of the buildings on the Harrisburg State Hospital campus are set to be demolished and one was destroyed in a fire in December 2024.

== Notable patients ==
- Edith May (pseudonym of Anne Drinker; 1827–1903), American poet

== In film ==
- The TV series Ghost Lab filmed an episode at the hospital which aired in the Fall of 2010 during the second season on the Discovery Channel.
- The TV series Ghost Nation filmed 2 episodes at the hospital which aired February 20 and 27, 2021 on the Discovery+ streaming service. Season 2: Episodes 19 and 20.
- The film Another Harvest Moon was filmed at the hospital and was released on August 7, 2009.
- The film Girl, Interrupted was filmed at the hospital as well as other various locations in and around Harrisburg, Pennsylvania. The hospital settings were meant to resemble those of the grounds of McLean Hospital in Massachusetts. (Note: The 'Administration' signs hanging in the car port of the Administration Building are not original to the hospital, they were created for the movie and the hospital staff left them up after the shooting was complete.)

== Gallery ==
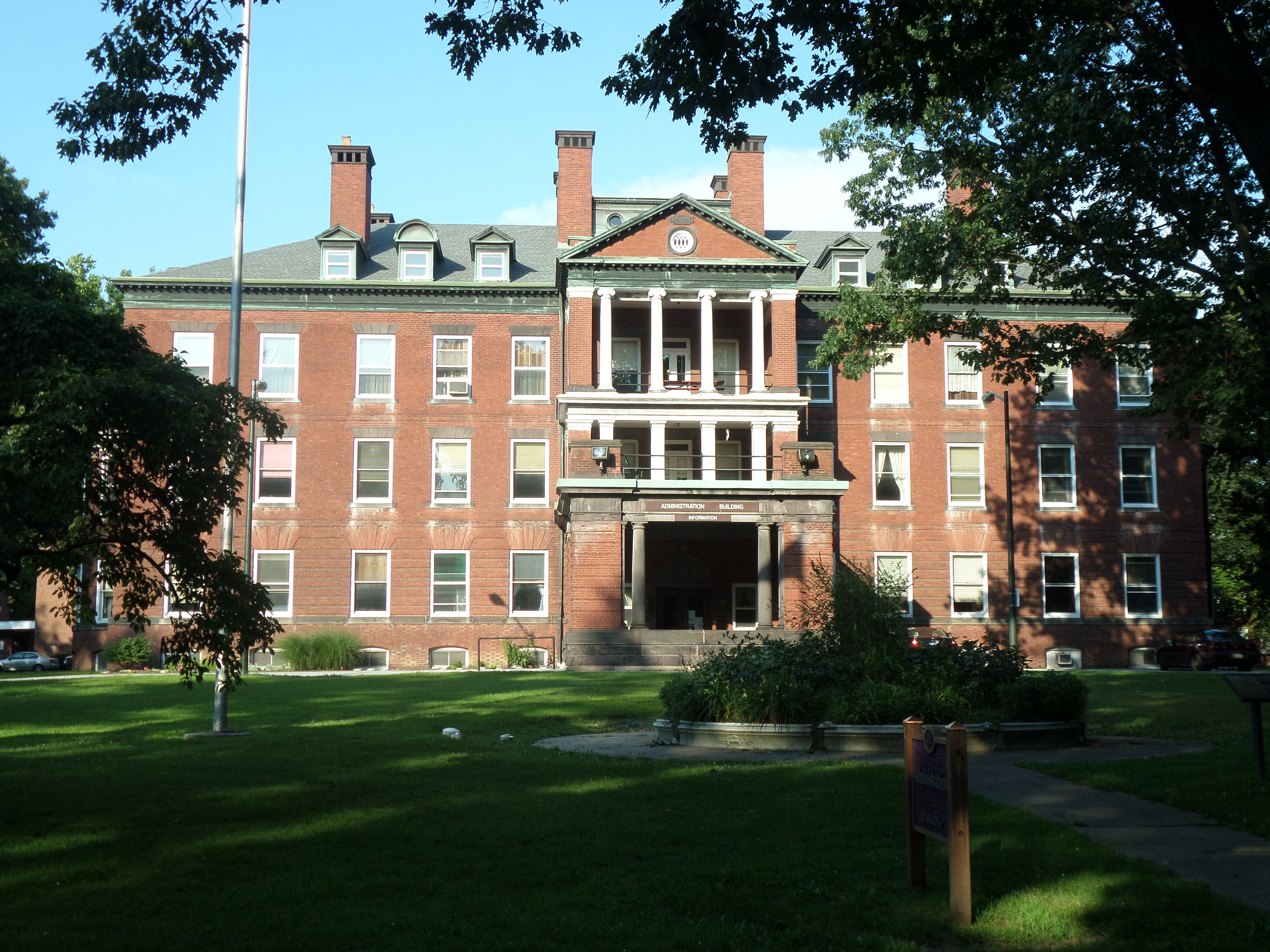
Front of the Admin building in 2013

== See also ==
- List of hospitals in Harrisburg
