= Manchester Township, York County, Pennsylvania =

Township in Pennsylvania, US

Coordinates: 40°02′00″N 76°44′29″W

- Township
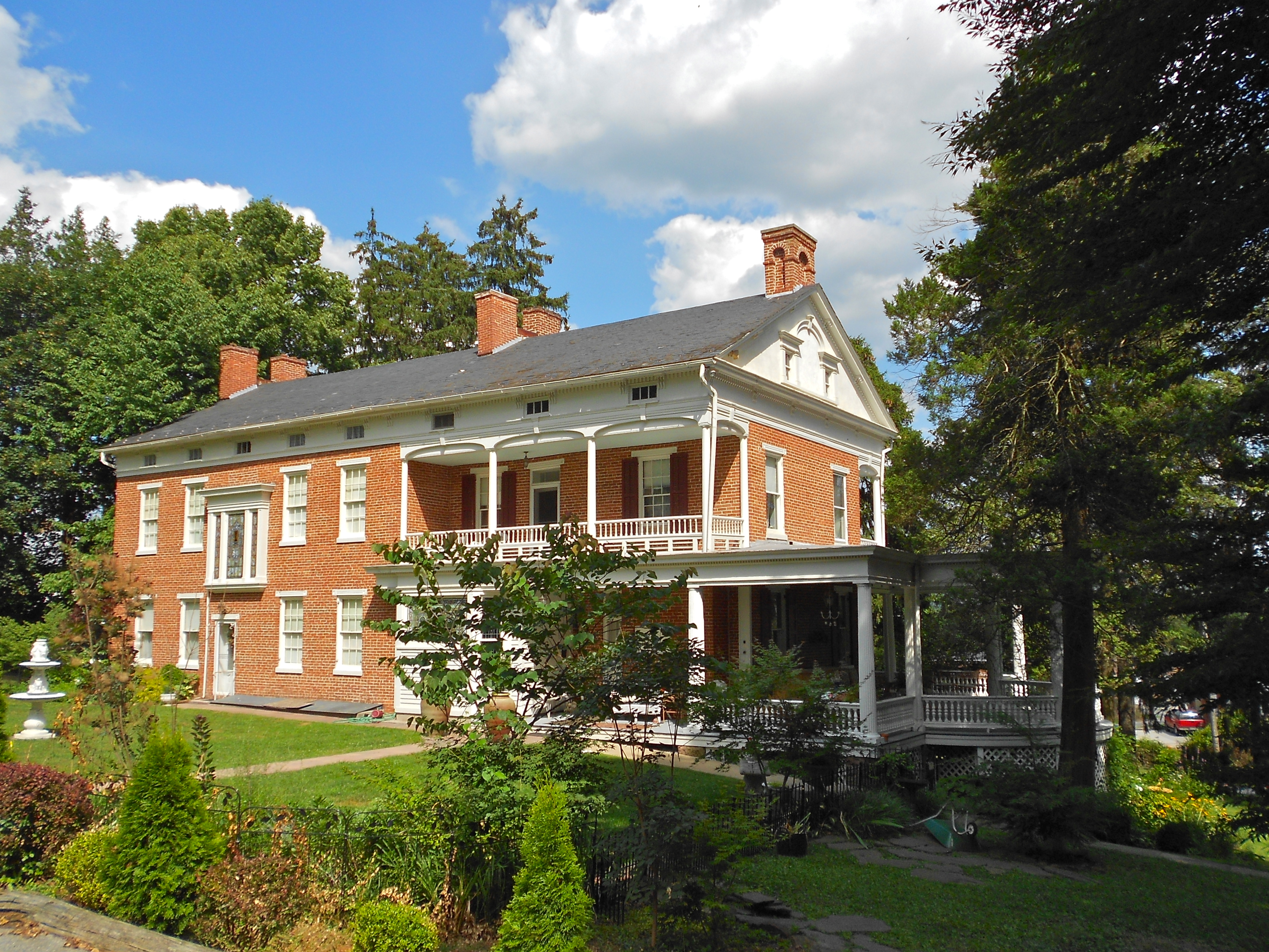
- Emig Mansion at Emigsville

- Location in York County and the state of Pennsylvania.
- Country: United States
- State: Pennsylvania
- County: York
- Settled: 1738
- Incorporated: 1742

Government
  - Type: Board of Supervisors

Area
  - Total: 15.90 sq mi (41.18 km^{2})
  - Land: 15.88 sq mi (41.14 km^{2})
  - Water: 0.015 sq mi (0.04 km^{2})

Population (2020)
  - Total: 19,514 ▲
  - Estimate (2023): 19,719
  - Density: 1,168.9/sq mi (451.33/km^{2})
- Time zone: UTC-5 (Eastern (EST))
  - Summer (DST): UTC-4 (EDT)
- Area code: 717
- FIPS code: 42-133-46872

Manchester Township is a township in York County, Pennsylvania, United States. The population was 19,514 at the 2020 census.

== History ==
Manchester Township, deriving its name from the English Duke of Manchester, was laid out in 1742 by Thomas Cookson, a representative of the Lancaster County Courts, because at that time York County was a part of Lancaster County. In the entire township there were 300 inhabitants. The first settlers were English Quakers, with German immigrants settling later and establishing it as an important agricultural community.

The Emig Mansion, Sinking Springs Farms, and Willis House are listed on the National Register of Historic Places.

Located in Emigsville, the Emigsville Band has operated as a community band since the late 1800s.

== Geography ==
According to the United States Census Bureau, the township has a total area of 15.9 square miles (41 km^{2}), of which 0.04 square miles (0.10 km^{2}), or 0.13%, is water. The township is bordered by the city of York to the south, and the borough of North York is enclosed on three sides by Manchester Township.

== Demographics ==
At the 2000 census there were 12,700 people, 4,951 households, and 3,688 families living in the township. The population density was 799.6 inhabitants per square mile (308.7/km^{2}). There were 5,122 housing units at an average density of 322.5 per square mile (124.5/km^{2}). The racial makeup of the township was 94.28% White, 2.09% African American, 0.12% Native American, 1.72% Asian, 0.02% Pacific Islander, 0.87% from other races, and 0.91% from two or more races. Hispanic or Latino of any race were 1.66%.

Historical population
Census	Pop.	Note	%±
1850	2,603		—
1860	2,595		−0.3%
1870	2,427		−6.5%
1880	2,636		8.6%
1890	1,783		−32.4%
1900	1,556		−12.7%
1910	1,577		1.3%
1920	1,547		−1.9%
1930	2,066		33.5%
1940	2,435		17.9%
1950	3,397		39.5%
1960	5,519		62.5%
1970	6,979		26.5%
1980	7,637		9.4%
1990	7,517		−1.6%
2000	12,700		69.0%
2010	18,161		43.0%
2020	19,514		7.5%

Of the 4,951 households 33.5% had children under the age of 18 living with them, 65.7% were married couples living together, 5.9% had a female householder with no husband present, and 25.5% were non-families. 20.3% of households were one person and 8.3% were one person aged 65 or older. The average household size was 2.54 and the average family size was 2.94.

The age distribution was 24.7% under the age of 18, 5.4% from 18 to 24, 31.6% from 25 to 44, 23.6% from 45 to 64, and 14.7% 65 or older. The median age was 38 years. For every 100 females there were 94.0 males. For every 100 females age 18 and over, there were 91.4 males.

The median household income was $53,472 and the median family income was $61,270. Males had a median income of $42,451 versus $29,744 for females. The per capita income for the township was $25,576. About 1.3% of families and 2.0% of the population were below the poverty line, including 2.1% of those under age 18 and 3.1% of those age 65 or over.

== Economy ==
York Barbell, a reseller of barbells and other equipment for weight training and bodybuilding and the home of the USA Weightlifting Hall of Fame, is headquartered in Manchester Township.
