= Willis House (York, Pennsylvania) =

Historic house in Pennsylvania, United States

- U.S. National Register of Historic Places
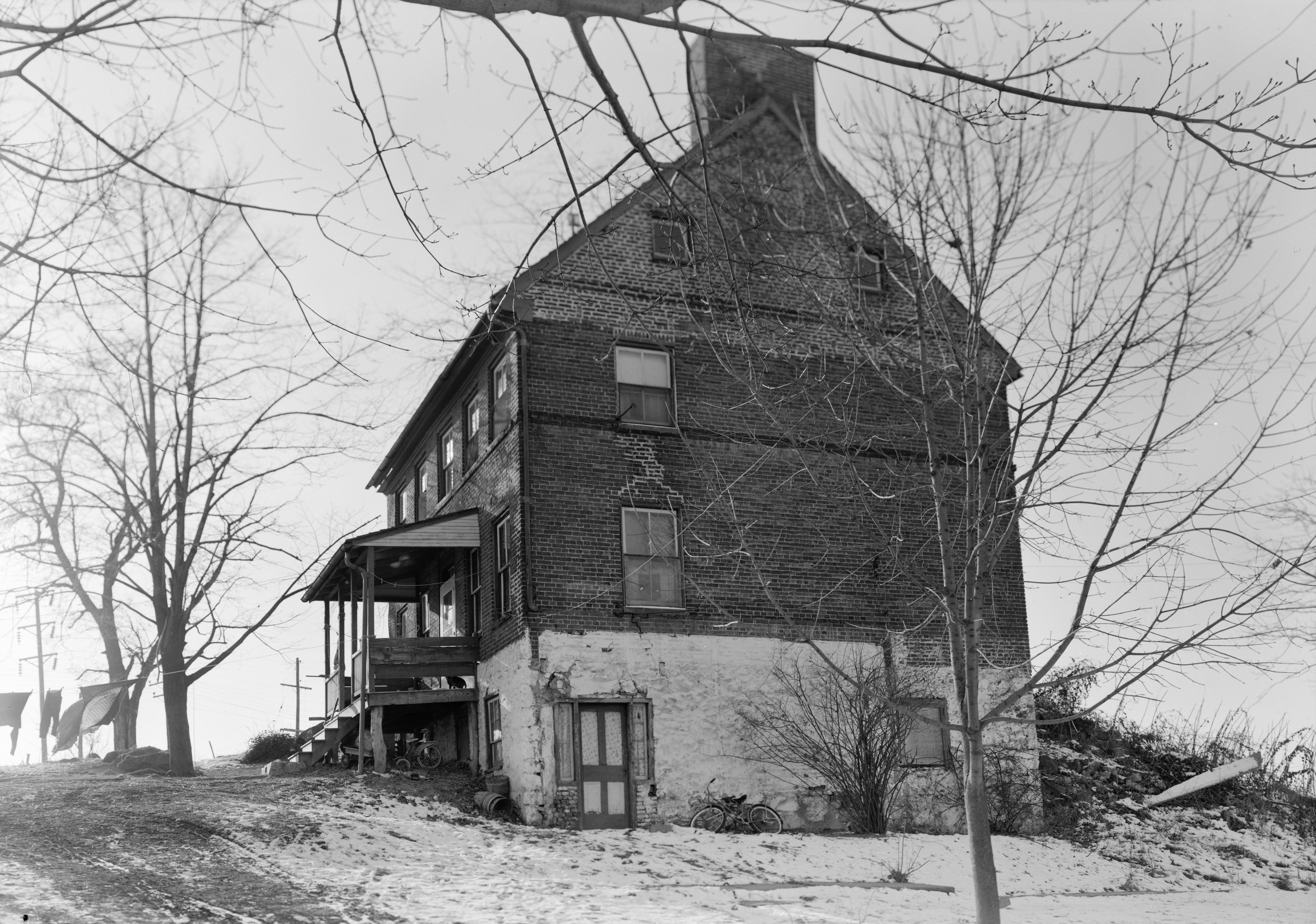
- Willis House in January 1963

- Location within Pennsylvania Location within the United States
- Location: 135 Willis Run Rd., north of York, Manchester Township, Pennsylvania
- Coordinates: 39°58′20″N 76°44′15″W
- Area: 2.6 acres (1.1 ha)
- Built: 1762
- Architect: Willis, William
- Architectural style: English Georgian
- NRHP reference No.: 79002370
- Added to NRHP: April 20, 1979

The Willis House is an historic home that is located in Manchester Township, York County, Pennsylvania, United States.

It was added to the National Register of Historic Places in 1979.

== History and architectural features ==
The builder of this historic residence, William Willis (1726–1801), was a Quaker who received 480 acres from Thomas Penn and Richard Penn Sr. in 1752. His grandfather, John Willis, was born in 1668 in Great Britain. In 1675, the family migrated to Westbury, Long Island, New York. His son, Samuel Willis (1778–1848), is frequently mentioned in local histories as "kindly Friend Willis," and was a major figure in the Underground Railroad.

Built in 1762, this historic structure is a 2 1/2-story, banked brick dwelling with a partly exposed basement. It measures 30 feet (9.1 m) long by 31 feet (9.4 m) wide and has a steeply pitched gable roof. The interior is laid out in a variation of a Georgian center hall plan.

It was added to the National Register of Historic Places in 1979.

== See also ==
- National Register of Historic Places listings in York County, Pennsylvania
