= Fairmount Historic District (York City, Pennsylvania) =

Historic district in Pennsylvania, United States

- U.S. National Register of Historic Places
- U.S. Historic district
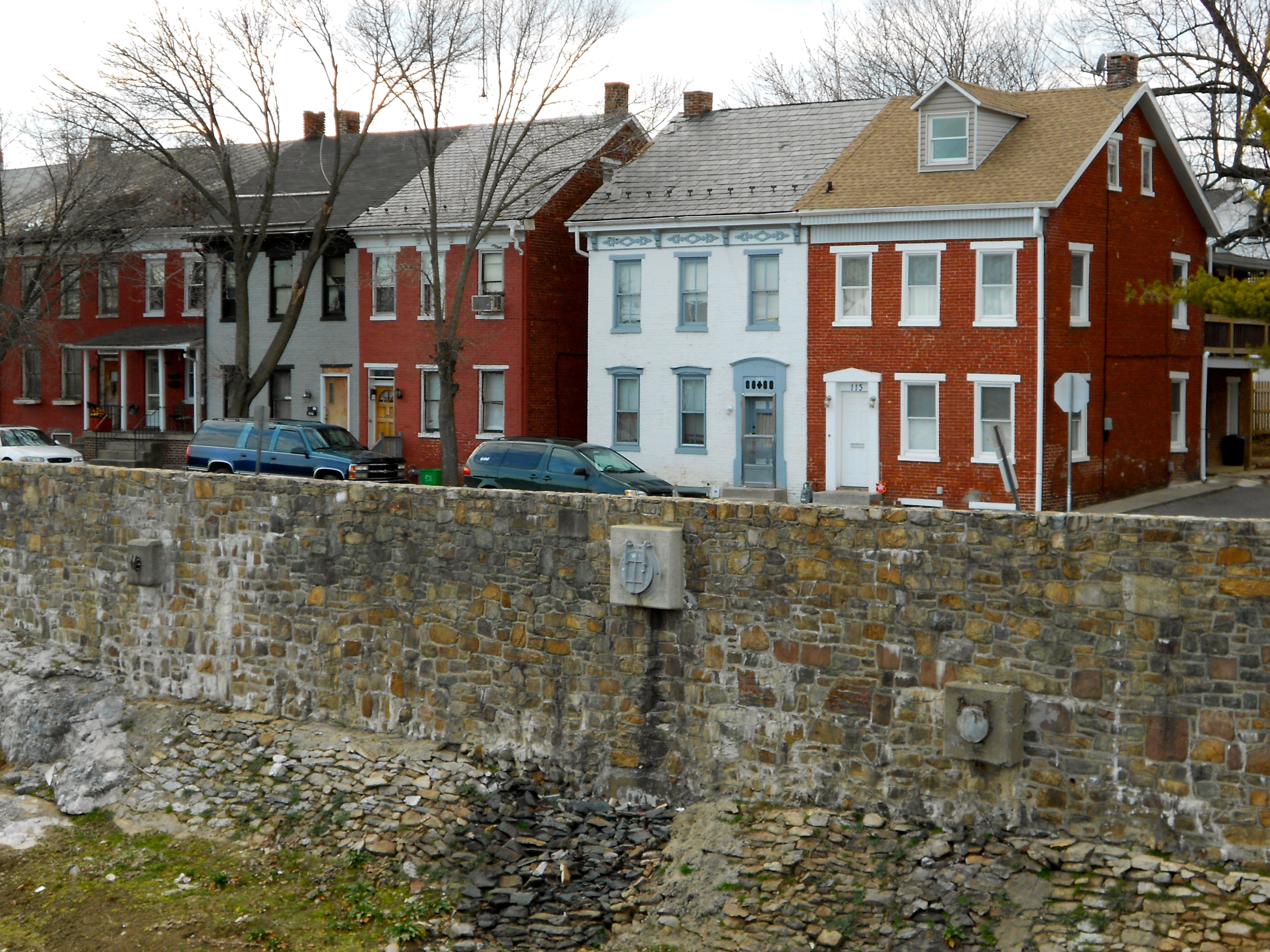
- Fairmount Historic District, February 2012

- Location within Pennsylvania Location within the United States
- Location: Roughly bounded by Cherry Ln., Stevens Ave. and Cottage Hill Rd., York, Pennsylvania
- Coordinates: 39°58′3″N 76°43′59″W
- Area: less than one acre
- Built: 1884
- Architect: Dempwolf, John A.; Spangler, Edward W.
- Architectural style: Queen Anne, Second Empire
- NRHP reference No.: 99001428
- Added to NRHP: November 30, 1999

Fairmount Historic District is a national historic district located in the Fairmount neighborhood of York in York County, Pennsylvania. The district includes 101 contributing buildings and 1 contributing site in a residential area of York. The neighborhood was developed between 1889 and about 1915, and includes notable examples of the Queen Anne and Second Empire styles.

It was listed on the National Register of Historic Places in 1999.
