= Springdale Historic District (York, Pennsylvania) =

Historic district in Pennsylvania, United States

- U.S. National Register of Historic Places
- U.S. Historic district
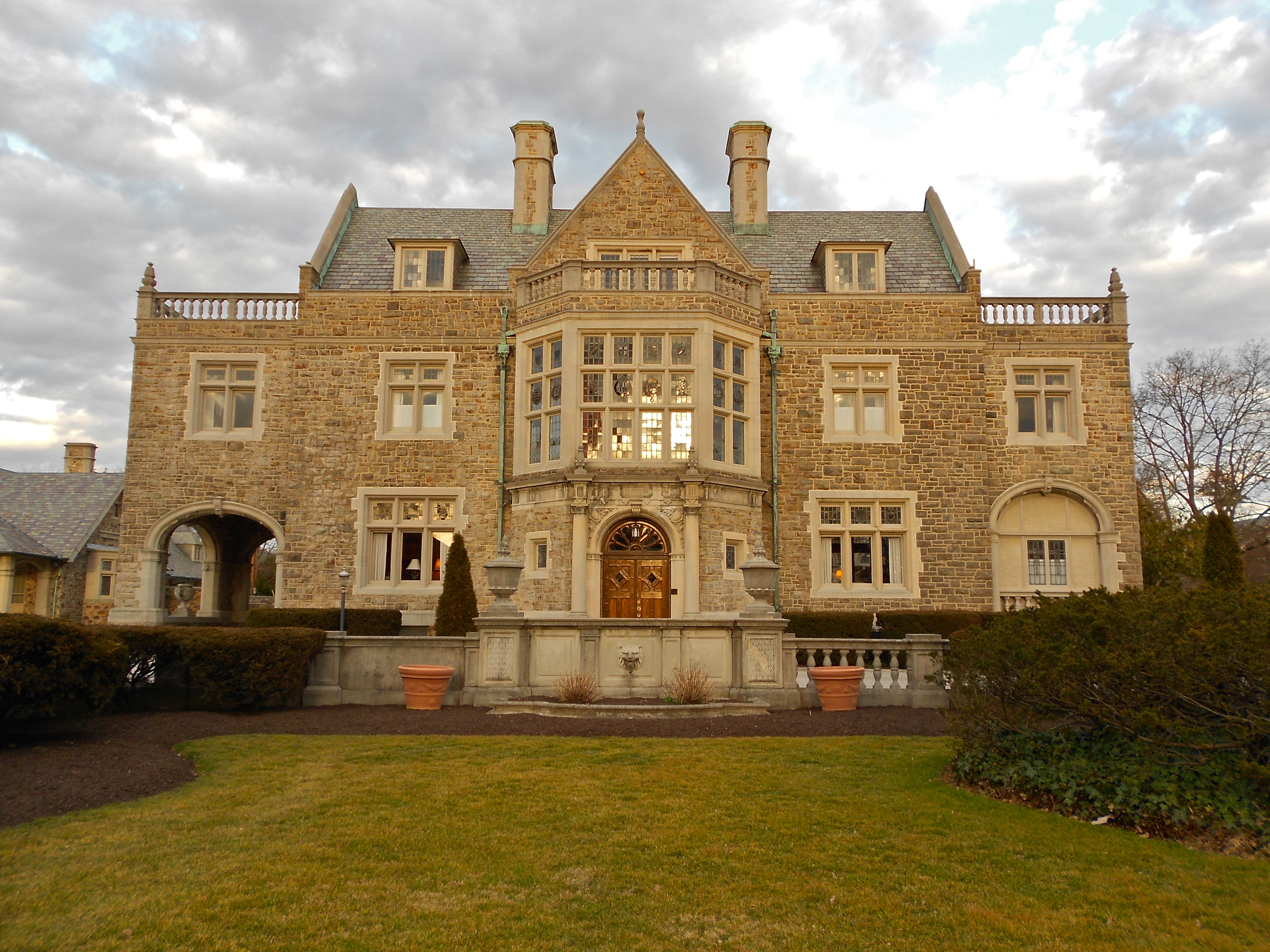
- House in the Springdale Historic District, February 2012

- Location within Pennsylvania Location within the United States
- Location: Bounded by S. George St., Lombardy Alley, S. Queen St., and Rathon Rd., York, Pennsylvania
- Coordinates: 39°56′58″N 76°43′04″W
- Area: 54.6 acres (22.1 ha)
- Architect: John A. Dempwolf; Reinhardt Dempwolf
- Architectural style: Colonial Revival, Classical Revival, et al.
- NRHP reference No.: 01000926
- Added to NRHP: August 30, 2001

The Springdale Historic District is a national historic district that is located in the Springdale neighborhood of York in York County, Pennsylvania.

It was listed on the National Register of Historic Places in 2001.

== History and architectural features ==
This district is situated south of the York Historic District and includes 199 contributing buildings and one contributing site that are located in a residential area of York. The neighborhood was developed between 1920 and 1950, and includes notable examples of the Colonial Revival and Classical Revival styles.
