= Stevens School (York, Pennsylvania) =

- U.S. National Register of Historic Places
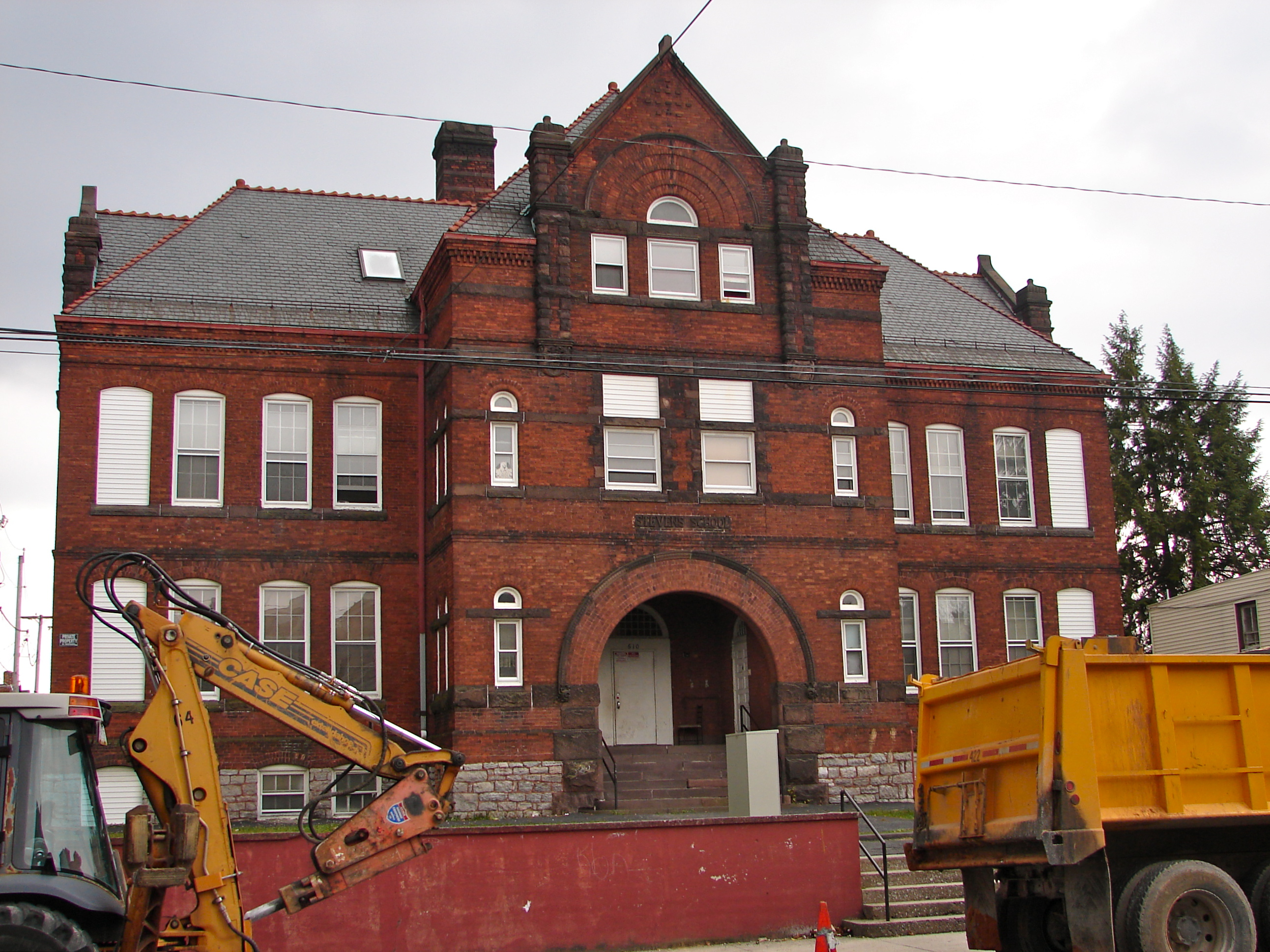
- Stevens School, November 2010

- Location within Pennsylvania Location within the United States
- Location: 606 W. Philadelphia St., York, Pennsylvania
- Coordinates: 39°57′31″N 76°44′40″W
- Area: 0.6 acres (0.24 ha)
- Built: 1889
- Architect: John A. Dempwolf; Reinhardt Dempwolf
- Architectural style: Romanesque
- NRHP reference No.: 83004263
- Added to NRHP: December 29, 1983

The Stevens School is an historic school building in York, York County, Pennsylvania, United States.

It was added to the National Register of Historic Places in 1983.

== History and architectural features ==
Designed by architect John A. Dempwolf and built between 1889 and 1890, this historic structure is a two-and-one-half-story, red-orange brick building that was created in the Romanesque Revival style. Built in the shape of a Latin cross, it has a slate covered hipped roof and features terra cotta ornamentation. It was named for Congressman Thaddeus Stevens (1792-1868). The building was converted to apartments.

== See also ==
- National Register of Historic Places listings in York County, Pennsylvania
