= York Historic District (York, Pennsylvania) =

Historic district in Pennsylvania, United States

- U.S. National Register of Historic Places
- U.S. Historic district
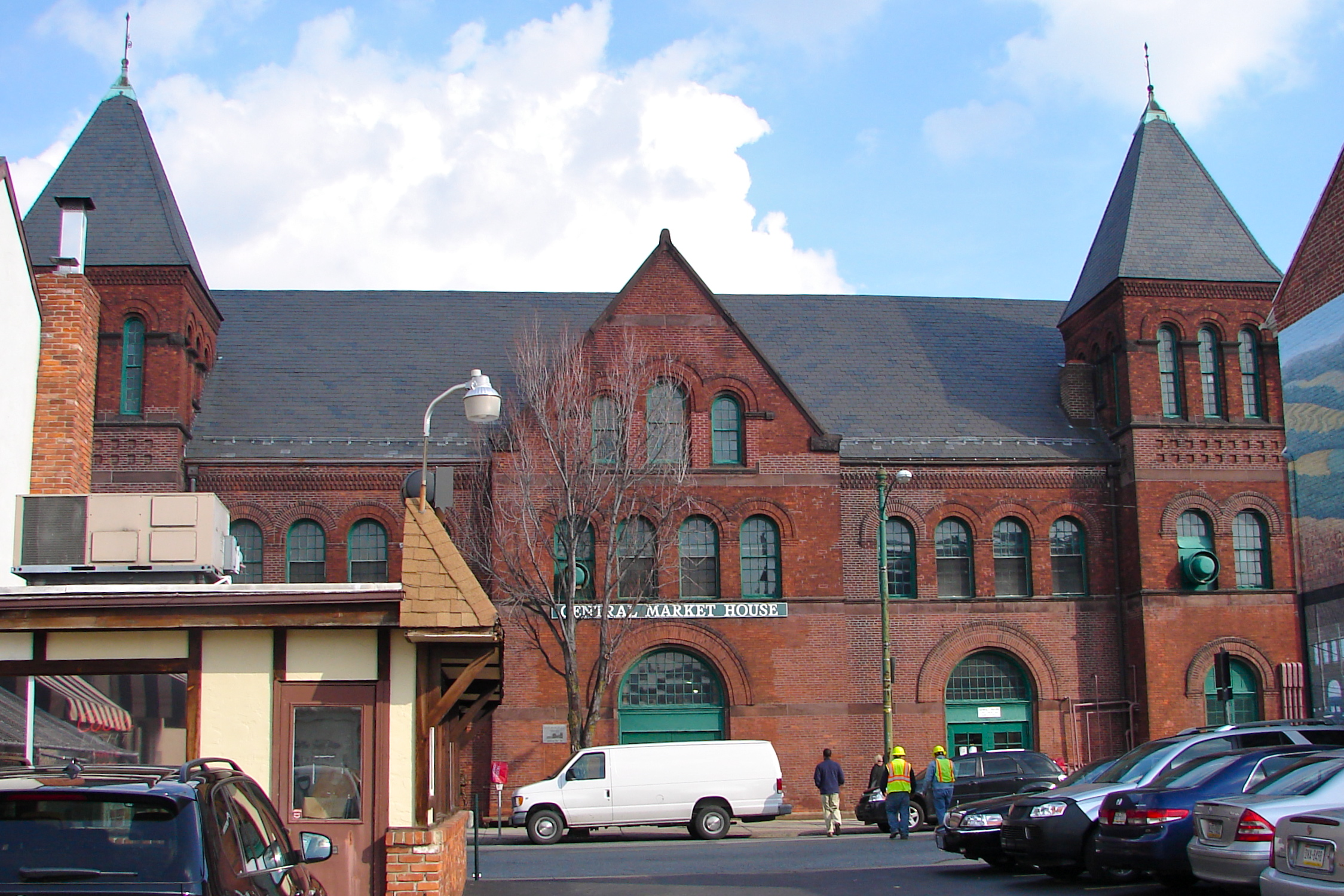
- Central Market

- Location within Pennsylvania Location within the United States
- Location: Roughly bounded by RR tracks, Hartley St., Lilac Lane, and Cordorus Creek, York, Pennsylvania
- Coordinates: 39°56′58″N 76°43′04″W
- Area: 722.8 acres (292.5 ha)
- Architect: John A. Dempwolf
- Architectural style: Classical Revival, Late Victorian, Dutch Revival
- NRHP reference No.: 79002371, 08001271 (Boundary Increase)
- Added to NRHP: August 29, 1979, December 30, 2008 (Boundary Increase)

The York Historic District is a national historic district that is located in the central business district and surrounding residential areas of York in York County, Pennsylvania, United States. It is situated north of the Springdale Historic District.

== History and architectural features ==
This district encompasses 309 contributing buildings and includes notable examples of the Late Victorian and Classical Revival styles. Notable buildings include the Christ Lutheran Church (1812–1814), Odd Fellows Hall (1850), U.S. Post Office (1911), Strand and Capitol Theatre (1923–1925), Elks Home (1860s), Pullman Factory Building (c. 1900), Sylvia Newcombe Center (1892), Friends Meeting House (1766–1783), William C. Goodridge house (1827), Otterbein United Methodist Church (1869), St. John Episcopal Church (1765), Lafayette Club (1839), National Hotel (1828–1863), Bon Ton (1911), Smyser-Bair House (1830s), and Pennsylvania Central Railroad Station (1880s).

Also located in the district but listed separately are the Barnett Bobb House and Gen. Horatio Gates House and Golden Plough Tavern.

This district was listed on the National Register of Historic Places in 1979, with a boundary increase in 2008.
