= York Central Market =

- U.S. National Register of Historic Places
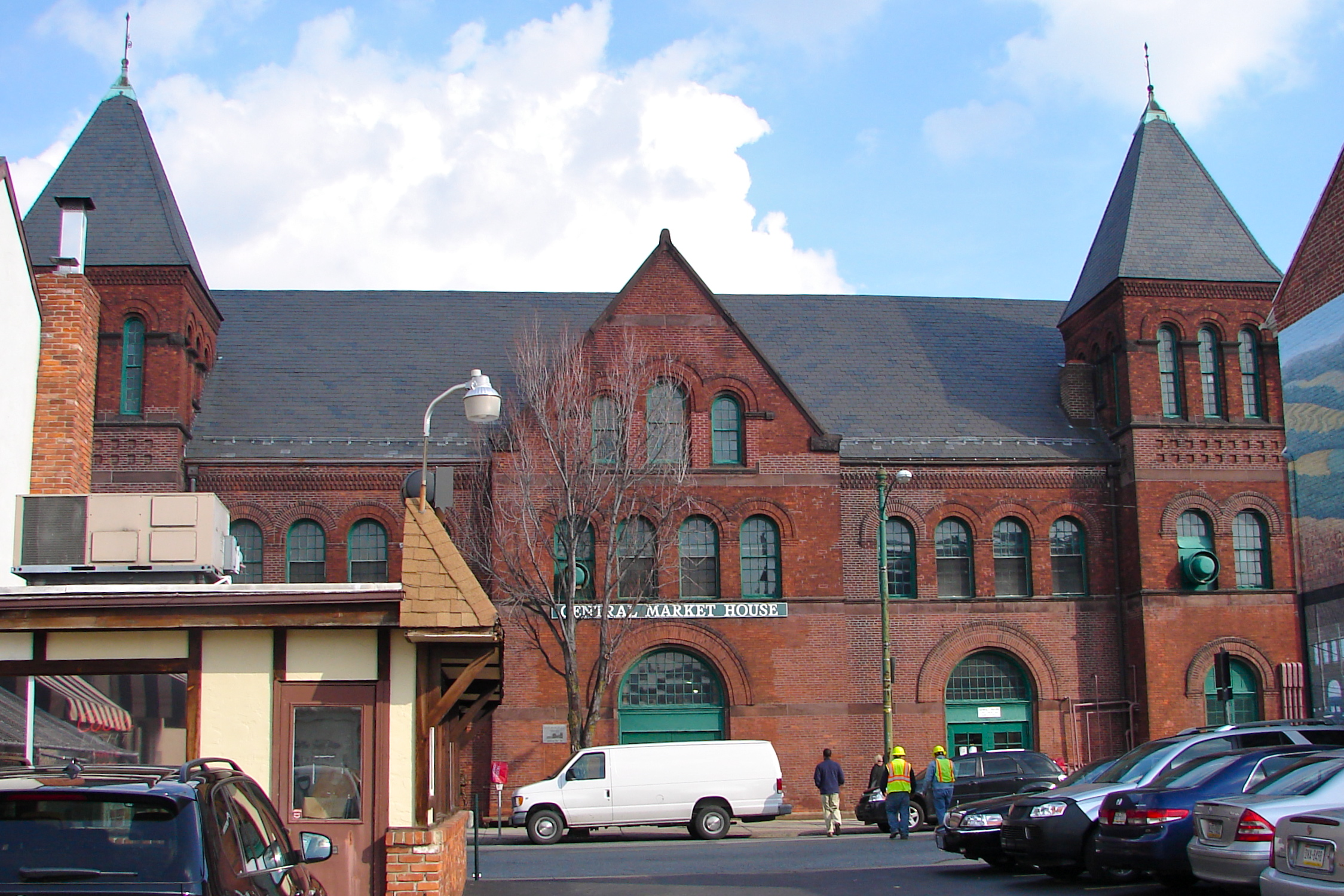

- Location within Pennsylvania Location within the United States
- Location: Philadelphia and Beaver Sts., York, Pennsylvania
- Coordinates: 39°57′46″N 76°43′47″W
- Area: 1.3 acres (0.53 ha)
- Built: 1888
- Architect: Dempwolf, John; Yinger, George
- Architectural style: Romanesque
- NRHP reference No.: 78002488
- Added to NRHP: June 9, 1978

The York Central Market, also known as Central Market York, is an historic public market in York, Pennsylvania, United States.

It was added to the National Register of Historic Places in 1978.

== History and architectural features ==
Designed by architect John A. Dempwolf and built in 1888, this historic structure is a large, two-story, brick building that was created in the Romanesque Revival style. It has a hipped roof with steep gable dormers and projecting front pieces. The front facade features two three-story square towers with pyramidal roofs projecting on each side of the main entrance.

== See also ==
- National Register of Historic Places listings in York County, Pennsylvania
