= Sinking Springs Farms =

- U.S. National Register of Historic Places
- U.S. Historic district
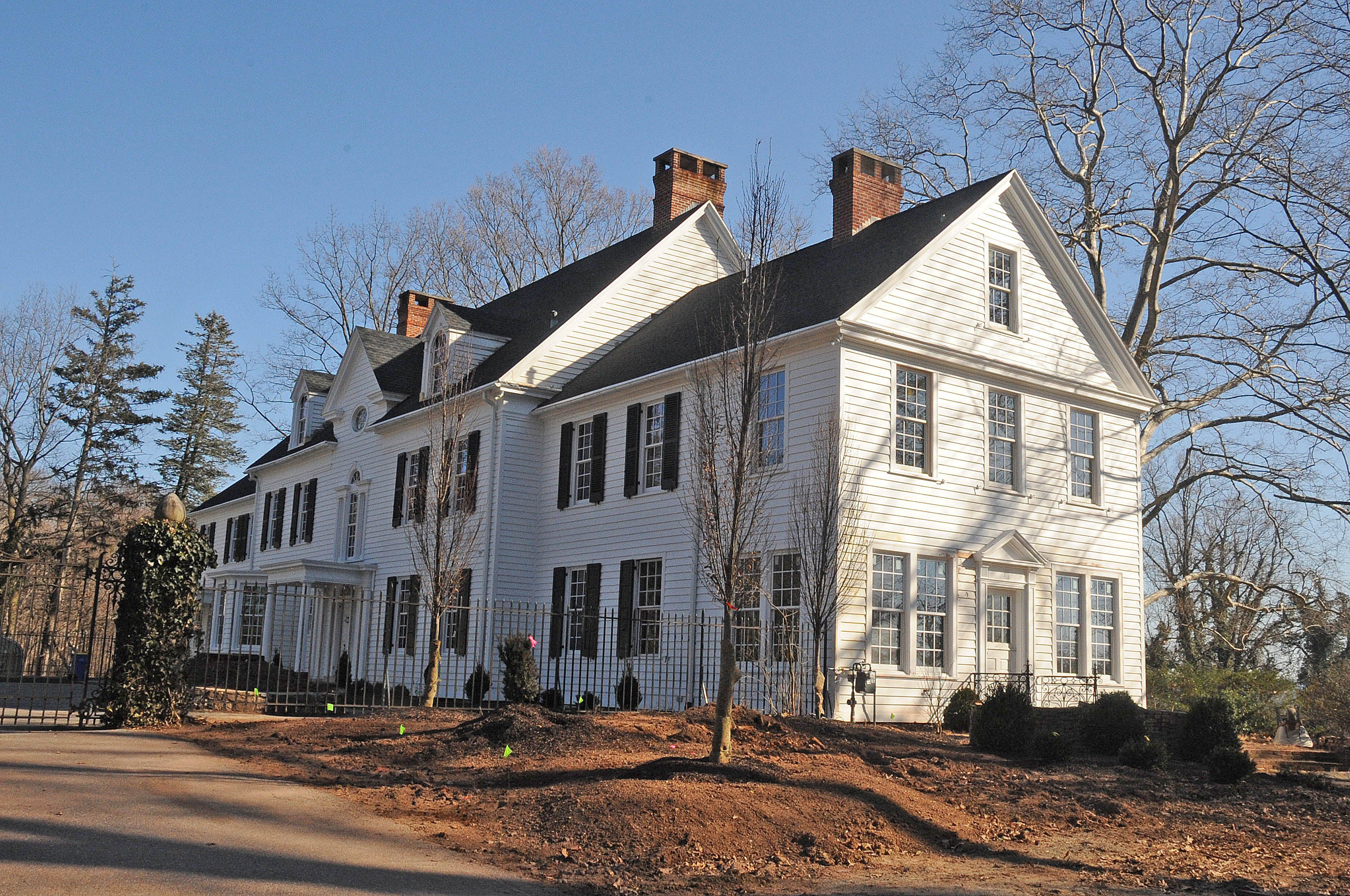
- Manor house

- Location within Pennsylvania Location within the United States
- Location: Roughly bounded by Church Rd., Sinking Springs Ln., N. George St., Locust Ln., Susquehanna Trail and PA 238, Manchester Township, Pennsylvania
- Coordinates: 40°00′37″N 76°44′33″W
- Area: 660.7 acres (267.4 ha)
- Architect: Dempwolf, John A.; et al.
- Architectural style: Colonial Revival, Shingle Style
- NRHP reference No.: 00000848
- Added to NRHP: July 27, 2000

Sinking Springs Farms is a historic farm and national historic district located at Manchester Township in York County, Pennsylvania.

The district includes 32 contributing buildings, 2 contributing sites, and 17 contributing structures. The district includes the Manor House Demesne, four farmsteads, and a Radio Broadcast Complex. The manor house dates to 1900, and is a 2 1/2-story, Colonial Revival-style dwelling modified between 1936 and 1941.

Farmstead #1 includes the earliest buildings, dated to about 1841. Farmstead #2 includes a Shingle Style dwelling designed by architect John A. Dempwolf and built about 1893. Farmstead #3 has a 3 1/2-story, banked Pennsylvania German dwelling built about 1845.

Farmstead #4 has a 3 1/2-story, banked Georgian-plan dwelling built about 1845. The Radio Broadcast Complex includes a 2 1/2-story, brick Colonial Revival-style office building and four radio towers, and used as a radio station from the 1940s until 1990.

It was listed on the National Register of Historic Places in 2000.

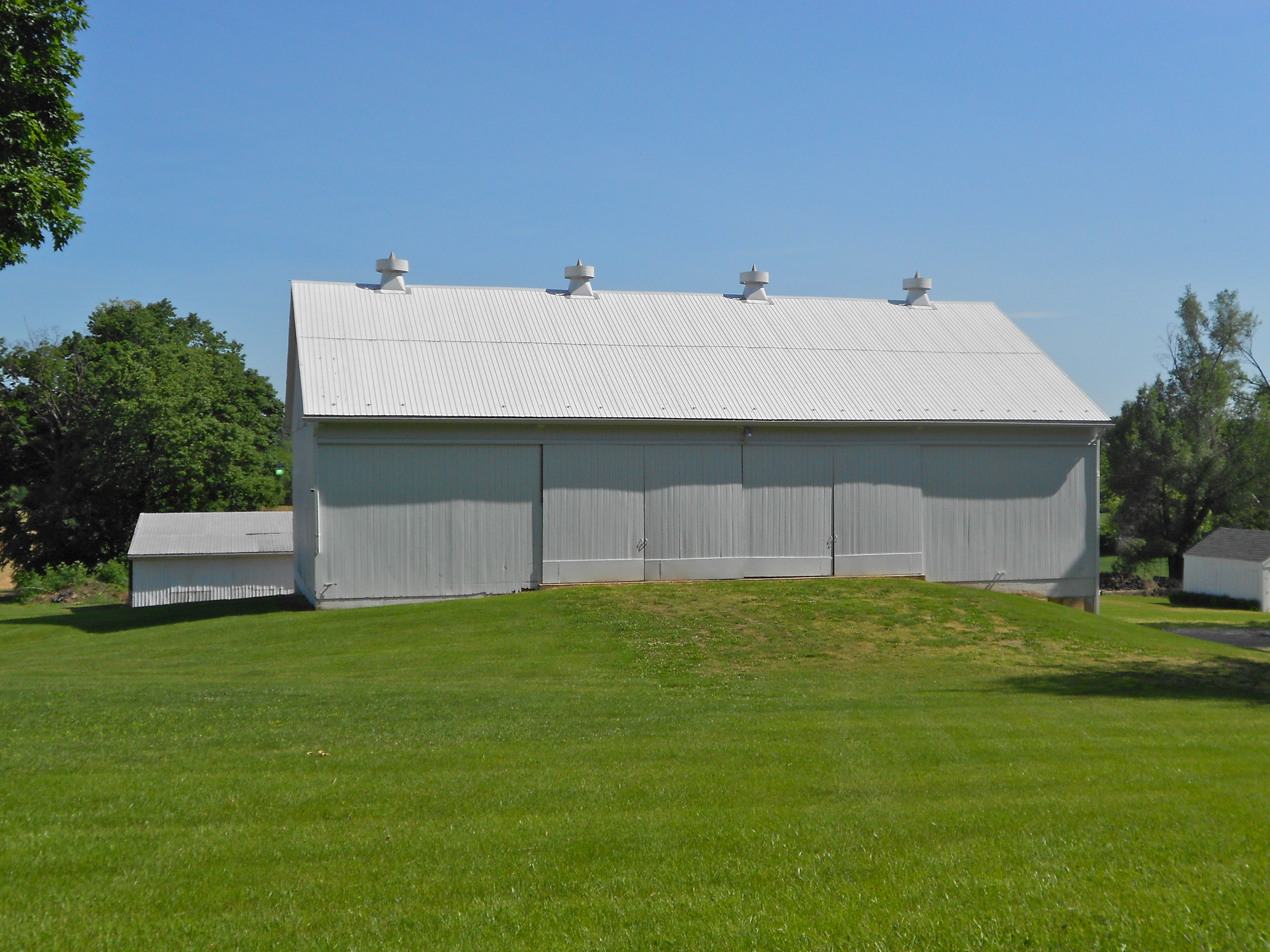
Barn off Sinking Springs Road
