= Community band =

Local band composed of volunteer musicians

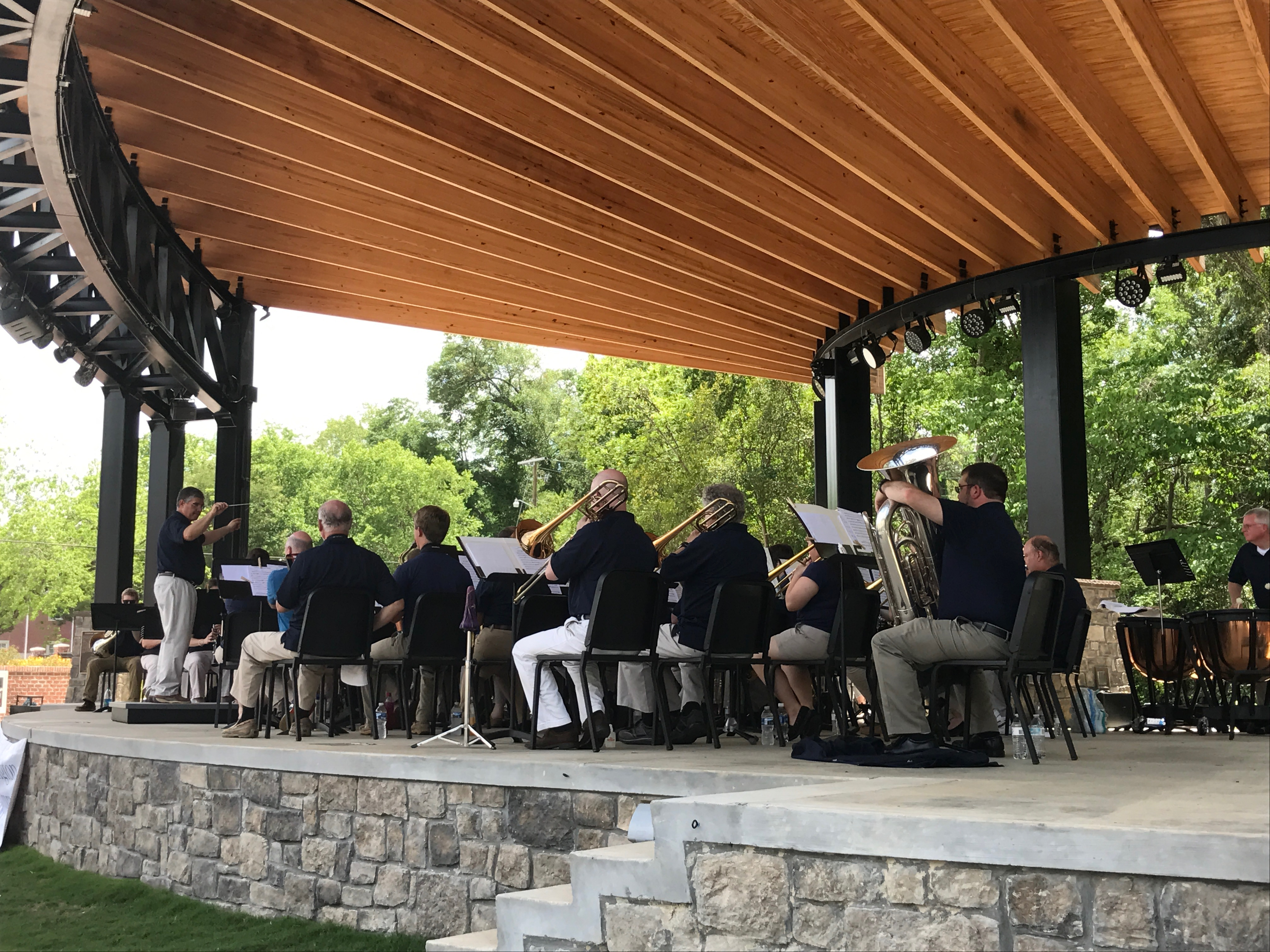
Lexington Community Band from Lexington, South Carolina

A community band is a concert band or brass band ensemble composed of volunteer (non-paid) musicians in a particular geographic area. It may be sponsored by the local (municipal) government or self-supporting. These groups rehearse regularly and perform at least once a year. Some bands are also marching bands, participating in parades and other outdoor events. Although they are volunteer musical organizations, community bands may employ an artistic director (conductor) or various operational staff.

Community bands can also be known as "town", "citizen", "city", "municipal" (which may pay their members) or "civic" bands. They may use the terms "wind orchestra", "wind symphony" or "wind ensemble" in place of "band" or some variation of the terms (e.g. "symphonic winds"). A group of this type often includes the name of the community or organization which sponsors it, the town or county where it is based, or a local geographical landmark or regional term in its name.

== Community bands in the United States ==
In the United States, community band concerts are most frequently given during holidays and patriotic events, such as the Fourth of July, Memorial Day, Father's Day and the lighting of community Christmas trees. During the summer, most community concerts are given outdoors. The size of a community band varies from about ten musicians to over one hundred. During the United States Bicentennial, having a community band was one of the criteria for being designated a "Bicentennial City". There are about 2,500 community bands across the United States.

The modern American community band is rooted in European tradition. Immigrants, like the German Moravians who settled in Pennsylvania and North Carolina, brought the band tradition with them. The Moravians organized bands in towns where they settled and they offered both secular and religious music selections. The Moravian bands are still playing in Moravian communities, such as in Winston-Salem, North Carolina.

Community bands in the United States often emerged from militia or military bands. The earliest amateur bands in the United States did occasionally include woodwind instruments but band and band music emphasized primarily the brass instruments. The popularity of early community bands can be attributed to the participation of thousands of ordinary citizens in these ensembles and the patriotic appeal of the music and performance.

There is one estimate that there were 10,000 bands in the United States in 1889. Of those, close to 100 are still active. Wartime patriotism, such as the War of 1812, the Civil War, World War I and II, and even the war with Iraq have added to the popularity and number of community bands.

In 1921, the famous band composer Karl King was influential in establishing the Iowa Band Law, which allowed cities to levy a local tax "for the maintenance and employment of a band for musical purposes". This law was eventually adopted by 28 other states.

Community bands experienced a great dying out after the end of World War I, victims of the automobile, new mass media and a large cultural shift. This actually led to a rise in school music programs when the death of community bands left instrument manufacturers without a market for their product, so they marketed heavily to schools.

The increased number of musicians who learned to play an instrument in high school or college bands but did not pursue music as a career has also provided a rich pool of amateur talent seeking an outlet for their musical abilities. An increased availability of music written for concert band has also benefitted the community band from after World War II to the present.

== See also ==
- Brass band
- March (music)
- Music history of the United States to 1900

== Other references ==
- Bowen, C. 1995, Adult Community Bands in the Southeastern United States: An Investigation of Current Activity and Background Profiles of the Participants, PhD dissertation, The Florida State University.
- Cohen, R. 1997. The Musical Society Community Bands of Valencia, Spain: A Global Study of Their Administration, Instrumentation, Repertoire and Performance Activities. PhD dissertation, Northwestern University.
- Compton, B. 1979. Amateur Instrumental Music in America, 1765-1810, PhD dissertation, Louisiana State University.
- Keoguh, Sarah Beth, 24 Apr 2003, The Geography of Community Bands in Virginia, Masters Thesis Virginia Polytechnic Institute and State University.
- Martin, P. 1982. A Status Study of Community Bands in the United States, PhD dissertation, Northwestern University.
- Marvin, A. 1997. 'Facing the Music: The turn of the century hometown band'. Kansas Heritage 5, 4: 4–8.
- Neidig, K. 1975. 'A survey of Community bands in the U.S.' The Instrumentalist, 30: 40–47.
- Rothrock, D. 1991. The perpetuation of the Moravian instrumental music tradition: Bernard Jacob Pfohl and the Salem, North Carolina, bands (1979-1960). Ed.D. dissertation, The University of North Carolina at Greensboro.
