= List of people from Norwich =

This is a list of non-fictional people from Norwich, past and present, who are identified with the UK city of Norwich through residential, historical, or cultural means, grouped by their area of notability, and in alphabetical order by surname.

== Past ==
Norwich has long been associated with radical politics, political dissent, liberalism, nonconformism and the arts. Past names associated with the city include:

=== Actors and musicians ===
- William Crotch (1775–1847), musical infant prodigy, composer, artist, and teacher
- Richard Lewis Hearne (Mr Pastry) (1908–1979), born in Norwich, actor, comedian, producer and writer
- Ruth Madoc (1943–2022), actress, stage and television entertainer, born in Norwich
- Jane Manning (1938–2021), opera soprano, born and raised in Norwich; attended Norwich High School
- Sir John Mills (1908–2005), actor born in North Elmham in Norfolk and educated at Norwich High School for Boys
- Thomas Morley (1558–1602), composer taught by William Byrd and organist at St Paul's
- Tony Sheridan (1940–2013), rock musician, born in Norwich

=== Artists and sculptors ===
- Artists belonging to the Norwich School of painters, including James Sillett (1764-1840), John Crome (1768–1821), John Thirtle (1777-1839), John Sell Cotman (1782–1842), John Berney Crome (1794–1842), George Vincent (1796–ca.1832), Joseph Stannard (1797–1830), Obadiah Short (1803–1886) and Frederick Sandys (1829–1904),
- Michael Andrews (1928–1995), painter
- Bernard Meadows (1915–2005), modernist sculptor
- Thomas Rawlins (1727–1789), Monument Mason with works in several Norwich churches

=== Church people ===
- Rev. John Abbs (1810–1888), missionary and author of Twenty-Two years' Missionary Experience in Travancore
- Thomas Bilney (ca.1495 – 1531), English Christian martyr, born at or near Norwich
- John Sherren Brewer (1809–1879), clergyman, historian, journalist and scholar
- John Cosin (1594–1672), English churchman
- Robert William Bilton Hornby (1821–1884), antiquarian, priest and lord of the manor, from the City of York, ordained deacon in Norwich in 1844
- John Lambert (died 1538), Protestant martyr burnt to death at Smithfield, London
- Julian of Norwich (1343-1416) anchoress, mystic and author
- Matthew Parker (1504–1575), archbishop of Canterbury
- John Stoughton (1807–1897), nonconformist minister and historian

=== Industrialists and merchants ===
- Louisa Sewell Abbs (née Skipper) (1811–1872), founder of girls' boarding schools in Travancore, India, who established the lace-making and embroidery industries there
- Jeremiah Colman (1777–1851), founder of Colman's Mustard
- Joseph John Gurney (1788–1847), banker and philanthropist who worked with his sister Elizabeth Fry (see above) on prison reform, and also active on the abolition of the slave trade and in the temperance movement

=== Science and medicine ===
- Peter Barlow (1776–1862), mathematician and physicist
- Jasper Blaxland (1880–1963), consultant surgeon at the Norfolk and Norwich Hospital
- John Caius (1510–1573), English physician
- Edith Cavell (1865–1915), born in Swardeston, 4 miles (6.4 km) south of Norwich, WWI nurse executed by firing squad by the Germans for helping Allied prisoners escape; buried on the east side of Norwich Cathedral
- William Cuningham (16th C), Elizabethan physician, cartographer and astrologer
- William Jackson Hooker (1785–1865), botanist and Fellow of the Royal Society
- Jennifer Moyle (1921–2016), biochemist known for development of chemiosmotic theory
- Sir James Edward Smith (1759–1828), botanist, natural historian and one-time owner of the Linnean collection of Carl Linnaeus
- James Edwin Thompson (1863-1927), surgeon
- Samuel Woodward (1790–1838), geologist and antiquary

=== Sports people ===
- Connie Adam (1927–2021), fencer and first woman Freeman of Norwich
- Eileen Ash (1911–2021), the oldest ever international cricketer, and Norwich resident
- Tristan Ballance (1916–1943), cricketer
- Billy Bluelight (c. 1859/1863–1949), pseudonym of William Cullum, known for his races against steam pleasure boats
- Geoffrey Colman (1892–1935), first-class cricketer and member of the Colman family
- Adrian Hayes (1978–2014), professional footballer
- Sir George Henry Morse (1857–1931), mountaineer and lord mayor of Norwich
- Ayrton Senna (1960–1994), racing driver, lived in Norwich in the early 1980s

=== Writers, poets and broadcasters ===
- Sarah Austin (1793–1867), translator from German and editor, born in Norwich
- Frances Catherine Barnard (1796–1869), author
- Carol Barnes (1944–2008), journalist and broadcaster, born in Norwich
- Pat Barr (1934–2018), writer, born in Norwich
- Elizabeth Bentley (1767–1839), author of Tales for Children in Verse, lived at 45 St Stephen's Square
- George Borrow (1803–1881), writer and traveller, attended the Norwich King Edward VI's Grammar School; he recalls the city and conversations with the philologist William Taylor in a semi-autobiographical novel, Lavengro
- Sir Thomas Browne (1605–1682), medical doctor, scientist, Christian mystic, polymath, author of acclaimed works in English literature
- Robert Greene (1558–1592), author of Friar Bacon and Friar Bungay (c. 1590)
- Louisa Gurney Hoare (1784–1836), diarist and writer on education
- Julian of Norwich (1343 – after 1416), medieval Christian mystic and contemporary of Chaucer, author of The Revelations of Divine Love, the first known book in English written by a woman
- Harriet Martineau (1802–1876), daughter of a Norwich manufacturer of Huguenot descent and devout Unitarian, whose writings include Illustrations of Political Economy (1832–34); supported the abolitionist campaign
- R. H. Mottram (1883–1971), novelist and lord mayor of Norwich
- Ross Nichols (1902–1975), poet and founder of Order of Bards, Ovates and Druids
- Amelia Opie (1769–1853), Norwich author and Quaker convert
- Henry Reeve (1813–1895), English journalist
- Elizabeth Scott (1708–1776), poet, hymn-writer
- W. G. Sebald (1944–2001), writer, professor of German literature at the University of East Anglia
- John Palgrave Simpson (1807–1887), born in Norwich, prolific and successful playwright

=== Other notable people ===
- William Calthorpe (1410–1494), four times Sheriff of Norfolk and Suffolk, purchased Erpingham manor in St. Martin's at the Palace, Norwich, in 1447
- Vernon Castle (1887–1918), ballroom dancer and promoter of modern dancing
- Sir Thomas Erpingham (1357–1428), officer in the Battle of Agincourt and Knight of the Garter
- Pablo Fanque (1796–1871), the first black circus proprietor in Britain, born in Norwich
- Elizabeth Fry (1780–1845), prison reformer, philanthropist and Quaker, born at Gurney Court in Magdalen Street, portrayed on the Series E (2005) £5 banknote
- Sir Vyvyan Holt (1896–1960), diplomat, orientalist and British minister, captured during the Korean War
- Rosa Howlett (1863–1961) – artist and suffragist
- Henry Johnson (1806–1910), born in Norwich, circus equestrian gymnast and acrobat
- Robert Kett (ca.1492 – 1549), Norwich's Robin Hood, landowner from Wymondham who led Kett's Rebellion in 1549 against corrupt Norfolk landowners and was hanged for treason at Norwich Castle
- Alfred Lungley (1905–1989), awarded the George Cross after the 1935 Quetta earthquake
- Louis Marchesi (1898–1968), founder in Norwich, in 1927, of the international charitable organisation the Round Table
- James Martineau (1805–1900), philosopher and brother to Harriet
- David Eyre Percival (1914–1985), City Architect
- Edmund Sheffield, 1st Baron Sheffield (1521–1549), murdered near the Adam and Eve pub off the Cathedral Close during Kett's Rebellion
- George Skipper (1856–1948), architect of many buildings in the city and elsewhere
- William Smith (1756–1835), Whig politician, dissenter and abolitionist, Member of Parliament (MP) for Norwich from 1807

== Present ==
=== Actors and media personalities ===
- Bimini Bon-Boulash (born 1993), contestant and runner-up on Series 2 of RuPaul's Drag Race UK
- Dominic Byrne (born 1972), news-reader and presenter on The Chris Moyles Show
- Sam Claflin (born 1986), actor, known for playing Finnick in The Hunger Games
- Olivia Colman (born 1974), Academy Award-winning actress
- Tom Edwards (born 1945), radio broadcaster and former television announcer
- Stephen Fry (born 1957), comedian, author, actor and filmmaker, studied at City College Norwich and was a Norwich City F.C. director
- Jake Humphrey (born 1978), TV presenter for CBBC and BBC coverage of Formula One, moved to Norwich aged nine
- JaackMaate (born 1993), YouTuber, podcast host, sports presenter, and comedian
- Marek Larwood (born 1976), actor and comedian
- Oliver Mason (born 1979), actor
- Zoe Telford (born 1973), actress known for parts in The Bill and Absolute Power
- Jon Tickle (born 1974), contestant on Big Brother and presenter on Brainiac: Science Abuse
- Tim Westwood (born 1957), BBC Radio 1 rap DJ and presenter of the MTV show Pimp My Ride UK, grew up in East Anglia and attended Norwich School and the Hewett School

=== Artists ===
- Tanya Burr (born 1989), make-up artist on YouTube
- Samantha Chapman (born 1977), make-up artist who has worked with the likes of Paul McCartney
- Colin Self (born 1941), contemporary artist, was brought up in Sprowston and attended Norwich School of Art
- Stella Vine (born 1969), painter, lived in Norwich from aged seven, and played at Norwich Theatre Royal; later moved back to Norwich and in 2006 painted the large sign Welcome to Norwich a fine city

=== Musicians ===
- Diana Burrell (born 1948), composer
- Cathy Dennis (born 1969), singer-songwriter
- Hannah Diamond (born 1991), PC Music singer-songwriter
- Myleene Klass (born 1978), singer, model, designer and classical music DJ, formerly of pop band Hear'Say, went to school in Norwich
- Let's Eat Grandma (formed in 2013), British pop group
- Beth Orton (born 1970 in Dereham), award-winning singer-songwriter, spent much of her childhood in Norwich, and attended The Hewett School
- Steve Osborne (born 1963), musician and record producer, grew up in Norwich, left in 1986
- Ronan Parke (born 1998), singer, came second in Britain's Got Talent 2011
- Sully, DJ and music producer specialising in jungle

=== Politicians ===
- Ed Balls (born 1967), former Labour Party MP
- Charles Clarke (born 1950), former Labour MP for Norwich South and Home Secretary, now visiting professor at University of East Anglia

=== Scientists, medical professionals and engineers ===
- Andrew Digby (born 1975), astronomer and ecologist
- Jess French, zoologist, naturalist and presenter of Minibeast Adventure with Jess on the CBeebies channel, grew up around Norwich and attended Norwich School
- Mike Gascoyne (born 1963), automotive engineer, technical director of the Caterham Formula One team
- Professor Sir Paul Nurse (born 1949), winner of the 2001 Nobel Prize in Physiology or Medicine, president of the Royal Society

=== Sports personalities ===
- Saraya-Jade Bevis (born 1992), professional wrestler, signed to WWE, performing as Paige
- Todd Cantwell (born 1998), professional footballer playing for Blackburn Rovers
- Will Evans (born 1997), rugby union player for Leicester Tigers
- Ralph Firman, Formula One (born 1975), driver, lives in Attleborough, races in the A1 Grand Prix series for Ireland
- Herbie Hide (born 1971), boxer, two-time WBO Heavyweight champion, was born in Nigeria, but lived and fought out of Norwich
- Danny Mills (born 1977), footballer, was born in Norwich and played for Norwich City 1995–1998
- Barry Pinches, professional snooker player
- Emma Pooley (born 1982), Olympic cycling silver medallist and winner of 2009 Women's Tour de France, attended Norwich School
- Sam Sexton, Heavyweight boxer
- Chris Sutton (born 1973), football player (striker), joint top scorer for Premier League in 1997/98, attended Hellesdon High School, where his father, Mike Sutton, taught
- Paul Warne (born 1973), former professional footballer and manager of Rotherham United F.C., born in Norwich
- Darren Webster (born 1968), PDC professional darts player and two-time PDC World Championship quarter-finalist
- Tom Youngs (born 1987), rugby union player, hooker for Leicester Tigers and England
- Taylor Barnard (born 2004), racing driver. Currently races for DS Penske in Formula E.

=== Writers ===
- Stuart Ashen (born 1976), reviewer, comedian, animator, actor and writer
- Peter Leigh (born 1983), documentarian and writer on computer history, YouTuber
- Sangu Mandanna (born c. 1987), writer
- Keiron Pim (born 1978), biographer, author of Endless Flight: The Life of Joseph Roth
- Sir Philip Pullman (born 1946), children's writer and author of the His Dark Materials trilogy
- D. J. Taylor (born 1960), biographer, critic and novelist

=== Other famous people ===
- Martin Burgess (born 1931), builder of Gurney Clock in the Castle Mall
- Tim Martin (born 1955), founder and chairman of British pub chain J D Wetherspoon
- David Perry (born 1942), street entertainer known as the Norwich Puppet Man
- Delia Smith (born 1941), celebrity chef and former joint majority owner of Norwich City F.C.
