= The Sustainability Initiative Fund =

The Sustainability Initiative Fund is a pioneering project set up by students at the University of East Anglia aimed at providing interest free capital for projects that will make the university campus more sustainable.

The initiative was set up in reaction to the increasing awareness amongst students about the threat of climate change. The fundamental aim of the fund is to improve the quality of life for UEA students while ensuring the quality of life of future students isn't compromised.

The first source of money for the fund will be the students at UEA via a sustainability fee of £1 per year per student. This measure was supported by UEA students in a campus referendum with a 78% majority. This will raise enough money to implement various projects such as renewable energy or energy conservation projects.

Once set up the fund will be controlled by a student majority, grant allocation committee. Student representatives will be chosen according to their knowledge, experience and aptitude concerning environmental projects.

The project has featured in a series of articles in the Concrete, the UEA student newspaper. It has also received coverage by Livewire, the student radio station and the Eastern Daily Press.

The project is being coordinated by a society at the University of East Anglia called 'The Campus Sustainability Initiative' which was formed in October 2006 by Peter Clutton-Brock, William Ashley Cantello and Nicola Birch.

The initial inspiration for TSIF came from a similar initiative at the University of California, Santa Barbara.
