= Ada Galsworthy =

English translator, editor and composer

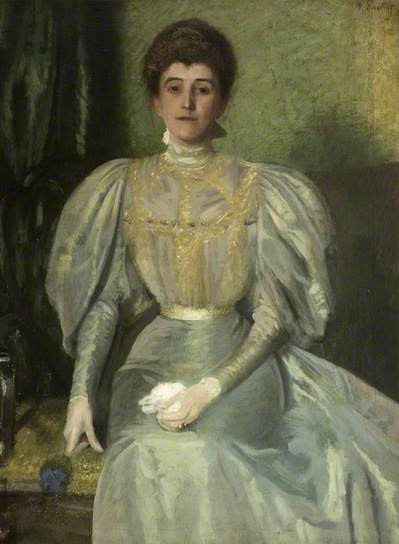
- Portrait by Georg Sauter, 1897
- Born: 20 November 1864
- Died: 29 May 1956 (aged 91); Newton Abbott, Devon, England
- Citizenship: British
- Occupations: Translator, editor, composer
- Spouses: Major Arthur Galsworthy (m. 1891; div. 1905) John Galsworthy (m. 1905; died 1933)
- Relatives: Lilian Sauter (sister-in-law); Rudolf Helmut Sauter (nephew)

Ada Nemesis Galsworthy (20 November 1864 – 29 May 1956) was an English editor, translator, writer and composer. She was married to Nobel Laureate for Literature John Galsworthy.

== Family and early life ==
Ada Nemesis Pearson was born on 20 November 1864; the location is unknown. She was baptised at St Clement's Church, Norwich on 24 November 1867. Born illegitimately, her parent was recorded as Anne Julia Pearson (c.1841–1913) from the Parish of Lakenham, Norwich. Her adoptive father was Dr. Emanuel Cooper (1802–1878). Both parents were of "Quaker persuasion". Galsworthy had an older brother, Arthur Charles.

When Dr. Cooper died, Galsworthy moved to Nottingham with her brother and mother, using the surname Cooper. She and her mother were "well provided for" under the terms of Dr. Cooper's will. Between 1881 and 1891, they made frequent, extended trips to Europe, her mother's principal purpose being to find a financially and socially suitable husband for her daughter. On one occasion the Prince of Wales, later King Edward VII, asked for an introduction. Her mother declined the honour.

Galsworthy and her mother did not get on; there was "a tragic lack of sympathy" between them. When her mother died in 1918 she did not attend the funeral, even though she was in England at the time.

== Personal life ==
She married Major Arthur Galsworthy (1860–1923) on 30 April 1891 in Kensington, London, having met him the previous winter, probably in Biarritz, France. He was six years older than Ada, with no current profession or occupation, relying on an annual allowance from his father. Soon after marrying Major Galsworthy, Ada met and became friends with Lilian and Mabel Galsworthy, her husband's cousins and sisters of the man who was to become her second husband, Arthur's cousin, John Galsworthy (1867–1933). She let them know she was already unhappy in her marriage. The reason for her unhappiness was never made explicit, but the implication was that Arthur could be violent.

While Arthur was away fighting in the Boer War Ada met John at a dinner party. They began an affair on 6 September 1896. In order to protect John's father, who held deeply entrenched Victorian views about the sanctity of marriage, and provided John a generous annual allowance, from the scandal of divorce, they continued their affair discreetly for ten years. During this time they travelled abroad at least once a year, often accompanied by a chaperone. She would regularly make herself two or more years younger on travel documents.

While Arthur was away at war, Ada left the marital home and lived alone at Campden House Chambers, Kensington, while John took a flat in nearby Aubrey Walk. It was in her flat that John wrote the first words of what was to become The Forsyte Saga. Upon Arthur's return from Africa in 1901, he did not initiate divorce proceedings, from the same desire to avoid a "possible scandal". Ada and John continued their relationship discreetly for a further three years, often staying at a farmhouse called Wingstone in the village of Manaton, Dartmoor. In 1908 John took a long lease on part of the building, and it became "their little haven" until it was sold in 1923.

In 1904 John's father died, meaning he was now financially independent and they were free to marry. They publicly announced a trip to Wingstone in December 1904, thus giving Arthur grounds for divorce. After divorce papers were served, Ada and John travelled around Italy, Germany and Austria from January to August 1905. The decree nisi was granted on 24 February 1905 and £400 was awarded to Arthur in damages.

The divorce was finalised on 22 September 1905 and they married the following day at St George's, Hanover Square. Following their wedding, Ada's mother refused to see her for years and her solicitor, who had managed her affairs for 25 years, resigned his position. She and John moved into a house on Addison Road, Kensington, where they lived until 1913. In the first few years of their marriage, they rarely travelled outside England.

In 1910 the couple encouraged 19-year old dancer, Margaret Morris to establish her own dance school. The following year, John had a one-year affair with her, but ended it out of loyalty to his wife.

After the early years of their marriage, they slept in separate rooms. Ada and John's marriage developed into "almost a mother-son relationship: an ailing mother cared for and protected by an utterly devoted son, a situation which their childlessness bolstered."

They had a spaniel called Chris to whom they were extremely devoted. When Chris died in the winter of 1911, Ada was "prostrate" with grief. A year later, such was the strength of their feelings about their loss, they moved away from Addison Road where memories of Chris were unavoidable, to Adelphi Terrace. This change also coincided with the start of regular overseas travels, mostly by train or car, as Ada was a "disastrously bad sailor".

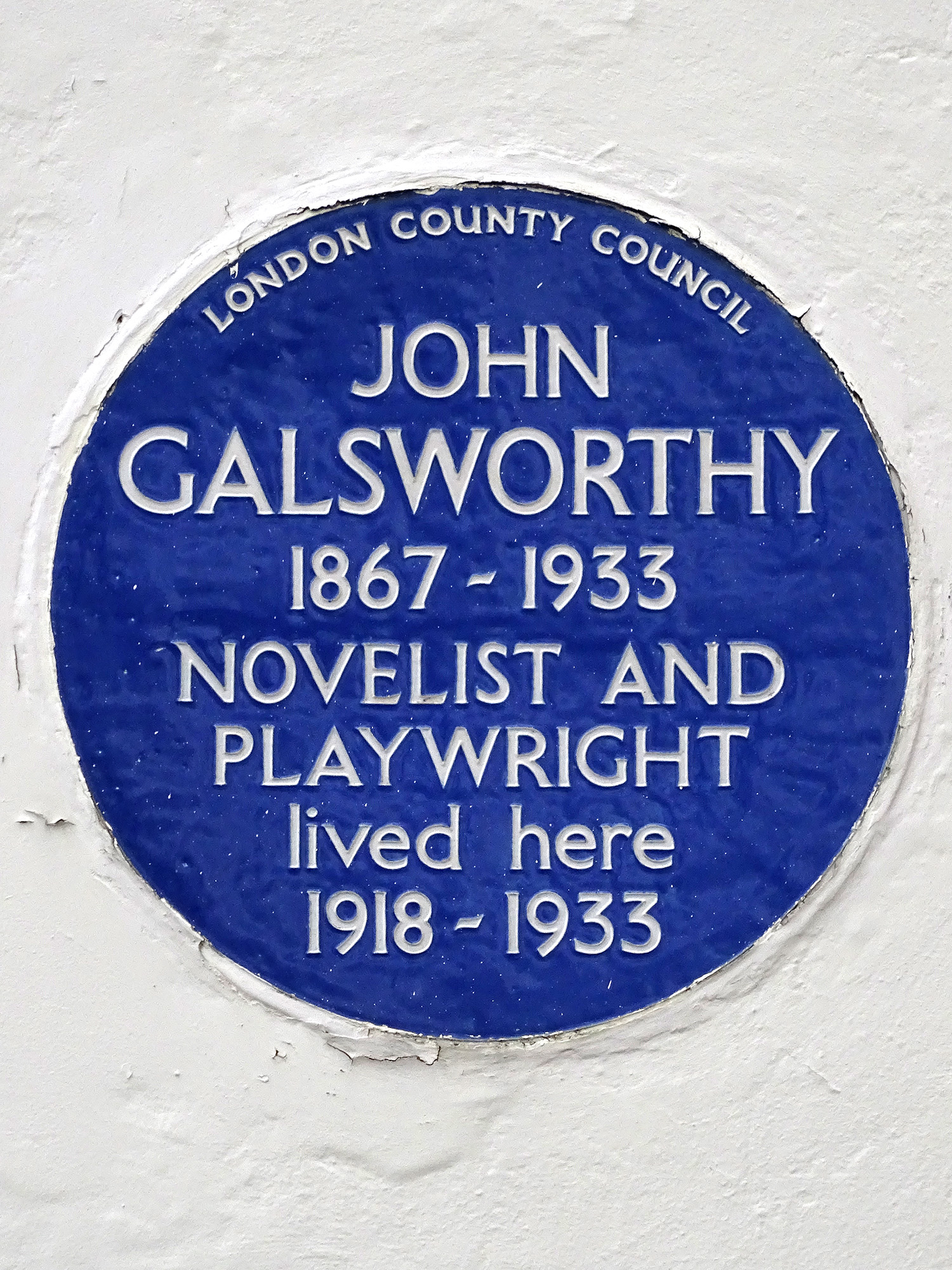
Grove Lodge plaque

In 1918 they moved to Grove Lodge, Hampstead.

In 1924, John's sister, Lilian, died. Her only child, the artist Rudolf Helmut Sauter, and his wife Viola moved in with them at Grove Lodge. In 1926 they bought Bury House in Sussex as their country home, serving as a permanent home for the younger couple, and a weekend retreat for Ada and John. The young couple began to accompany them on their regular winter journeys abroad.

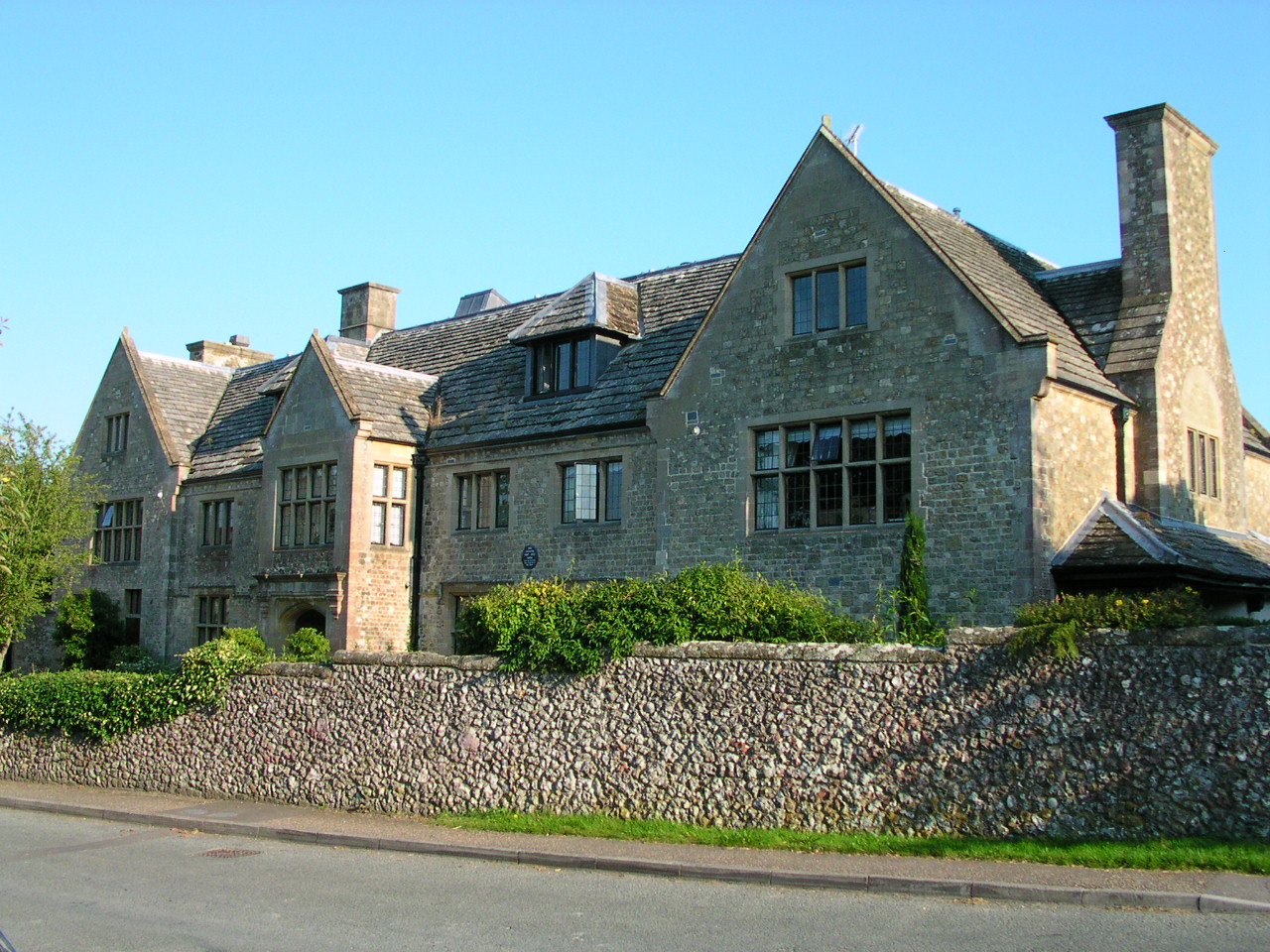
Bury House, West Sussex

When John died in 1933, Ada ceased to appear in public. For a short time she was "almost unbalanced" and tried to have his favourite horse killed.

She was encouraged to leave London during World War II, and moved to Torquay. When she discovered that Muriel Elliot, a fellow piano student she had met while travelling through Europe with her mother, was homeless following a London bombing raid, Galsworthy offered her a home. They lived together until Elliott died 10 years later.

Galsworthy died at home in Newton Abbot, Devon aged 92 on 29 May 1956. Her funeral was sparsely attended, with fewer than a dozen mourners. Her ashes were scattered on Bury Hill.

=== Health ===
Galsworthy's health was not robust throughout her adult life. She regularly suffered from bronchitis, asthma, rheumatism and head colds, which she and John often elevated to the level of "the 'Flu", incapacitating her for weeks. Once she and John were married, some noted that she had "turned into a shrewish hypochondriac". John acted as her devoted nurse. She was described as "clinically depressed", "ill" with "psychosomatic illnesses". By the end of her life she was nearly blind.

=== Travel ===
Galsworthy spent her adolescence and early adult years travelling through Europe with her mother. They were in Nice at the time of the 1887 Liguria earthquake. They were in Dresden for the unveiling of the Niederwald monument to commemorate the unification of Germany. In 1869, she stayed at the same hotel in Munich as Franz Liszt who was in the city for the world premiere of Wagner's Das Rheingold, which she also attended.

Once married, she and John travelled extensively, visiting Ireland, France, Germany, Belgium, Czech Republic (the former Czechoslovakia), Austria, Denmark, Norway, Portugal, Poland, Italy, Spain, Sweden, USA, Canada, Brazil, Morocco, Egypt, Tunisia, Algeria and South Africa.

Their travel served several purposes. John's position as President of P.E.N. meant he was regularly required at overseas conferences. They would travel to watch the first night performances of John's plays, or in search of "more permanent health" of Ada, who had a "tendency to bronchial delicacy in the winter." The majority of their time abroad was spent walking and writing.

=== Social causes and support ===
In 1907 she pledged a donation to the Votes For Women campaign's Week of Self-Denial, which asked women to "practice real self-denial". It stated: "the funds raised will be the measure not only of every woman's devotion to principle, but the measure of her gratitude to the hundreds of brave women who have taken the brunt of the fighting and have suffered violence and imprisonment for her sake." Galsworthy donated £1 and 1 shilling.

In 1914 she signed an open letter from the Royal Society for the Protection of Birds in support of the Importation of Plumage Prohibition Bill.

In 1925 she signed an appeal, written by the Managing Editor of the periodical Animals, asking for financial support for the cat artist Louis Wain so that he could afford better accommodation than the lunatic asylum for paupers to which he had been committed.

In the 1930s she donated money to the Worthing Corporation (the forerunner to present-day Worthing Borough Council) to support the purchase of land at High Salvington.

In the lead-up to World War II she worked to get Jewish writers and musicians out of central Europe and over to England.

=== World War I service ===
During the First World War the Galsworthys contributed saddlery, binoculars, an ambulance and a Motor Launch (called the John and Ada) together with all royalties from John's literary work sold in the US, to the war effort. Galsworthy also knitted a large quantity of socks, blankets and scarves for the troops. In autumn 1914, they arranged for the placement of a number of Belgian refugees in Devon.

In November 1916, wanting to do more, they travelled to France to join an Hôpital Benevole, the Establissement de L'Assistance Aux Convalescents Militaires Français, at Matouret in Die, Drôme, owned by their friend Dorothy Allhusen. John worked as a masseur, Galsworthy as a lingère, or 'keeper of house linen' as well as overseeing correspondence and other departments. Her considerable knowledge of French stood her in good stead with the locals. When work was finished for the day, she would accompany the poilus in their "light-hearted Petits Chansons." They returned to England the following March. She was awarded the Victory Medal and the British War Medal as a member of the British Committee, French Red Cross in Company WO 329 between 1914 and 1920.

They spent the rest of the war at Wingstone, making occasional trips to London, sometimes sharing a basement with J. M. Barrie and his family during air raids.

== Writing ==
=== Author ===
Galsworthy published three books:

- The Dear Dogs (1935)
- Over the Hills and Far Away (1937)
- Lapland Journey (1938)

=== Translator ===
Galsworthy spoke excellent French, plus some Italian and German. She began translating the work of Guy de Maupassant into English in the early 1900s. She called on the assistance of her friend Joseph Conrad to help. Of this she wrote "Having great conclaves with J. Conrad recently, he is helping me with some translations from the French: he being Polish, French is quite second nature to him. I hate taking up his time, yet… it seems quite a relaxation to him, and he can't do his own original writing all day long." She published three volumes of translations:

- Mademoiselle Perle and Other Stories (1908)
- Yvette and Other Stories (1914) reprinted in 1915 and 1920
- Mademoiselle Fifi and Other Stories (1919)

In late 1931 and early 1932, she and John translated the libretto of Bizet's Carmen into English.

=== John Galsworthy's editor and compiler ===
John often said that his wife's influence was a major factor in turning his career from law to literature. In her 1937 book Over the Hills and Far Away, she recalls telling him, "Why don't you write? You are just the person." Galsworthy's previous unhappy marriage inspired John's novel The Man of Property (1906), which began the series of books that became known as The Forsyte Saga. The character Irene is a portrait of Ada. A framed letter from John stood next to Galsworthy's bed until her death. It read "I super-dedicate in its entirety The Forsyte Saga whose first word was written on Campden Hill, London of a May morning in 1903 and whose last word was written at Hampstead on 15 August 1920. Of all my work I have most enjoyed the making of this chronicle, and on the whole set more store by it than anything else I have written up to now. This is why I super-dedicate the whole of it to one without whose instigation, sympathy, interest and criticism, my obscure inner necessity might never have pushed through the mufflement of circumstance and made me a writer – such as I am." (1921)

She regularly edited his writing and was solely responsible for his public and private correspondence, as well as creating the first three typescripts from his handwritten manuscripts.

John directed in his will that no biography of him should be published without the consent of his wife. After he died she oversaw the posthumous completion of several volumes for which she wrote the forewords, recounted memories or simply gathered and inscribed extracts. She edited and/or compiled the following:

- Forsyte Saga (1922) preface
- Manaton Edition of the works of John Galsworthy (1922) prefaces
- Ex Libris John Galsworthy (1933) selected by John and Ada Galsworthy
- The Collected Poems of John Galsworthy (1934) editor
- End of the Chapter (1935) foreword
- John Galsworthy: Life and Letters (1935) by H V Marrot, in collaboration with Ada Galsworthy
- The Winter Gardens (1935) foreword
- Glimpses and Reflections (1937) foreword
- Forsyte, Pendyces and Others (1935) foreword

She tore out her diary entries spanning 1895 until 1905, the duration of her affair, until the year she became "respectable" again. After John died she destroyed all of his letters to her and most of her letters to him.

=== Other writers ===
Galsworthy had an intellectual relationship with Polish-British writer, Joseph Conrad. He encouraged Galsworthy's translation work and supported her work on Yvette and Other Stories, writing the preface. He also shared drafts of his own writing with her, including The Secret Agent and Under Western Eyes, seeking her opinion. The first of Joseph Conrad's theatrical adaptations One Day More was written in Galworthy's flat on Campden Hill in 1904.

She encouraged Ralph Hale Mottram (1883–1971), son of the trustee of her marriage settlement to Arthur, to write poetry, under the pen name J. Marjoram.

== Music ==
She was a talented pianist and could read at sight very well. She was described as being of "professional, or nearly professional calibre by those who heard her play." Between 1883 and 1888, she spent considerable time in Dresden as a private piano student of Jean Louis Nicodé. Of this she wrote, "I do not think he was greatly interested, for he knew only too well I should rightly have been in a low class the Conservatorium, working my way up like the rest of the music-students. My mother would not consent to this, her argument being that I played nicely enough for an amateur, and that there was no question of my becoming a professional, ever."

In Over The Hills And Far Away she recounts "the most fine-spun, delicate of musical flirtations" whilst staying in a hotel room two doors away from a young German Prince. They both had pianos installed in their sitting-rooms and spent time sharing musical ideas through the walls, "I would give out a theme, then pause; very soon the young neighbour would start improvising in a masterly manner."

She accompanied the well-known bass, Signor Foli, at a concert in Menton on the French Riviera and took the place of a pianist who had become ill in a concert of duets at the Salle Érard on Great Marlborough Street in 1898.

She began composing songs while in Dresden, but would dedicate more time to composition after she met John. She set several of his poems to music, with a first public performance in 1903. Her music was featured in a concert at London's Steinway Hall in 1907.

- The Almond Tree (1907)
- Four Songs (1907)
- Seventeen Songs (1913): A Mood, June, Wind! Wind! When Love is Young, Magpie, Counting the Stars, The Moor Grave, The Irish Blackbird, Past, Spring, Rose and Yew, Blackbird's Love Song, Straw in the Street, The Almond Tree, The Moon at Dawn, Rhyme of the Land and Sea, The Downs.

She also set two Robert Browning poems to music: Pippa's Song and In The Doorway published as Two Songs in 1907.

== Other ==
- Nemesis – play by Stephen Plaice (2008) A three-hander dramatising the Galworthys' marriage, premiered at Minerva Theatre, Chichester
