= Lilian Sauter =

English poet and suffragist

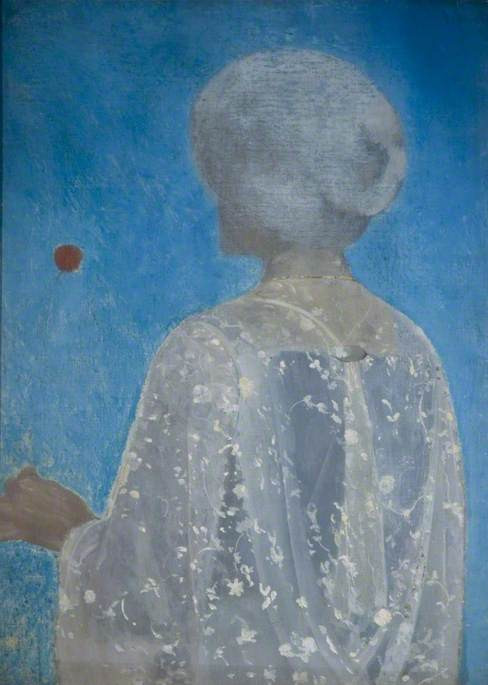
- Born: Blanche Lilian Galsworthy; 1 September 1864; Marylebone, London, England
- Died: 27 October 1924 (aged 60)
- Occupation(s): Poet, suffragist
- Notable work: Through High Windows (1911)
- Spouse: Georg Sauter
- Children: Rudolf Helmut Sauter
- Relatives: John Galsworthy (brother); Ada Galsworthy (sister-in-law)

Lilian Sauter (née Blanche Lilian Galsworthy, 1 September 1864 – 27 October 1924) was a poet and suffragist who, as a 'well read and independent-minded woman', was a significant influence on the life and work of her brother John Galsworthy.

== Life ==
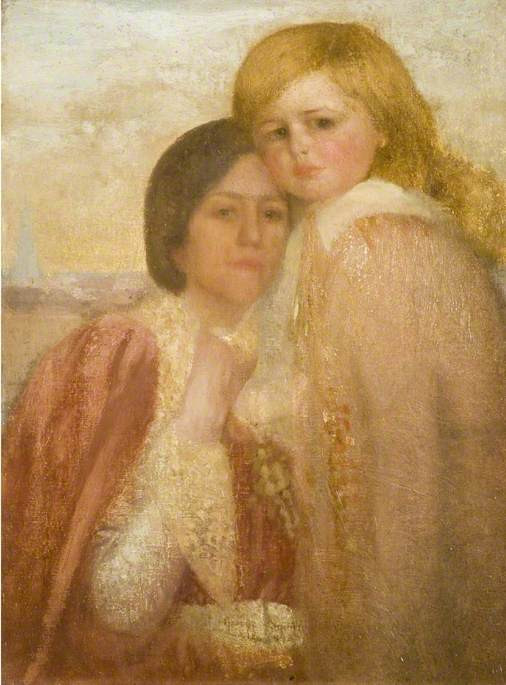
Lilian Sauter with her son, Rudolf, painted by her husband Georg Sauter (1899)

Blanche Lilian Galsworthy was born 1 September 1864, the oldest of four children born to Blanche Bailey (1837–1915) and solicitor John Galsworthy (1817–1904). As well as two brothers, John and Hubert, she had a sister: Mabel Edith (born 1871).

According to John Galsworthy's biographer, "Lilian and Mabel were girls of clear minds and vigorous wills. Neither had any intention of being restricted to domestic routines, as their mother would certainly have preferred; and fortunately they had, in their father, a loving champion of their desire to live more fully." Lilian, who loved to attend lectures, exhibitions, and concerts, was known as the "intellectual sister". Mabel wrote:

Of our elder sister Lilian, I remember that even at that time she was so quiet and studious as to seem more than her three years older than John. A rare spirit in a frail body, it was she who brought to us three younger ones the greater part of such mental stimulus as our very normal, ordinary lives ever knew. Always quietly busy herself with her painting, reading or writing, it was she who would start interesting subjects for discussion; she who told us stories when we were little; she who opened our eyes and minds to beautiful things to be seen or heard or read.

In 1894, Lilian married the German artist Georg Sauter. The couple honeymooned, and stayed for a year in, Bad Wörishofen, where their son Rudolf was born. Following their return to London, John Galsworthy bought them a house at 1 Holland Park Avenue, the upper part of which was converted into a studio for Georg. In 1916 Georg was interned as an enemy alien and later expelled back to Germany. Lilian never saw her husband again. In 1918, Rudolf was also interned as he had been born in Germany.

Writer and poet Ralph Hale Mottram wrote of Sauter that she 'won my rather overawed provincial heart with the first glance of her beautiful grey-blue eyes... Beautifully dressed, with just a touch to show her devotion to the arts and to the current internationalism that differentiated her from the average Kensington hostess, she made me welcome.'

As well as being a lover of the arts and known for fostering a welcoming salon for the artists and writers of London, Sauter was a suffragist. She contributed poems to various suffrage publications, and was Honorary Secretary of the Spiritual Militancy League, a suffrage organisation led by Adela Coit.

== Death and legacy ==
In 1924, Sauter contracted pleurisy, and though she seemed to have recovered, subsequently died from a heart attack. In a letter to Mottram, John Galsworthy wrote: "Fate drove us sorely... I lost my eldest sister, Mrs. Sauter, very suddenly".

On her death, newspapers noted that Sauter had been "a poetess of achievement", "whose personality was far-reaching in its personal influence." In the years since, Lilian Sauter's influence on her family and wider circles has been acknowledged. According to Helen Carr:

[Lilian] had led the family rebellion against their narrow-minded and deeply conformist mother, and married Sauter, who was not only a foreigner and an artist but of peasant stock, against considerable family opposition; this act of defiance in support of the arts, Sauter himself always thought, gave Galsworthy the courage to become, in spite of family disapproval, a novelist and writer.

Catherine Dupré describes her as "a person of extraordinary character and will-power and of quite outstanding intellectual ability." Dupré suggests that "It was with her that [John Galsworthy] first exchanged ideas on philosophy and religion, first began to consider questions of social justice, and even whether his own affluent circumstances, in a world where so many were poor and suffering, were tolerable".

== Works ==
- Through High Windows (1911)
