= John Galsworthy =

English novelist and playwright (1867–1933)

John Galsworthy OM
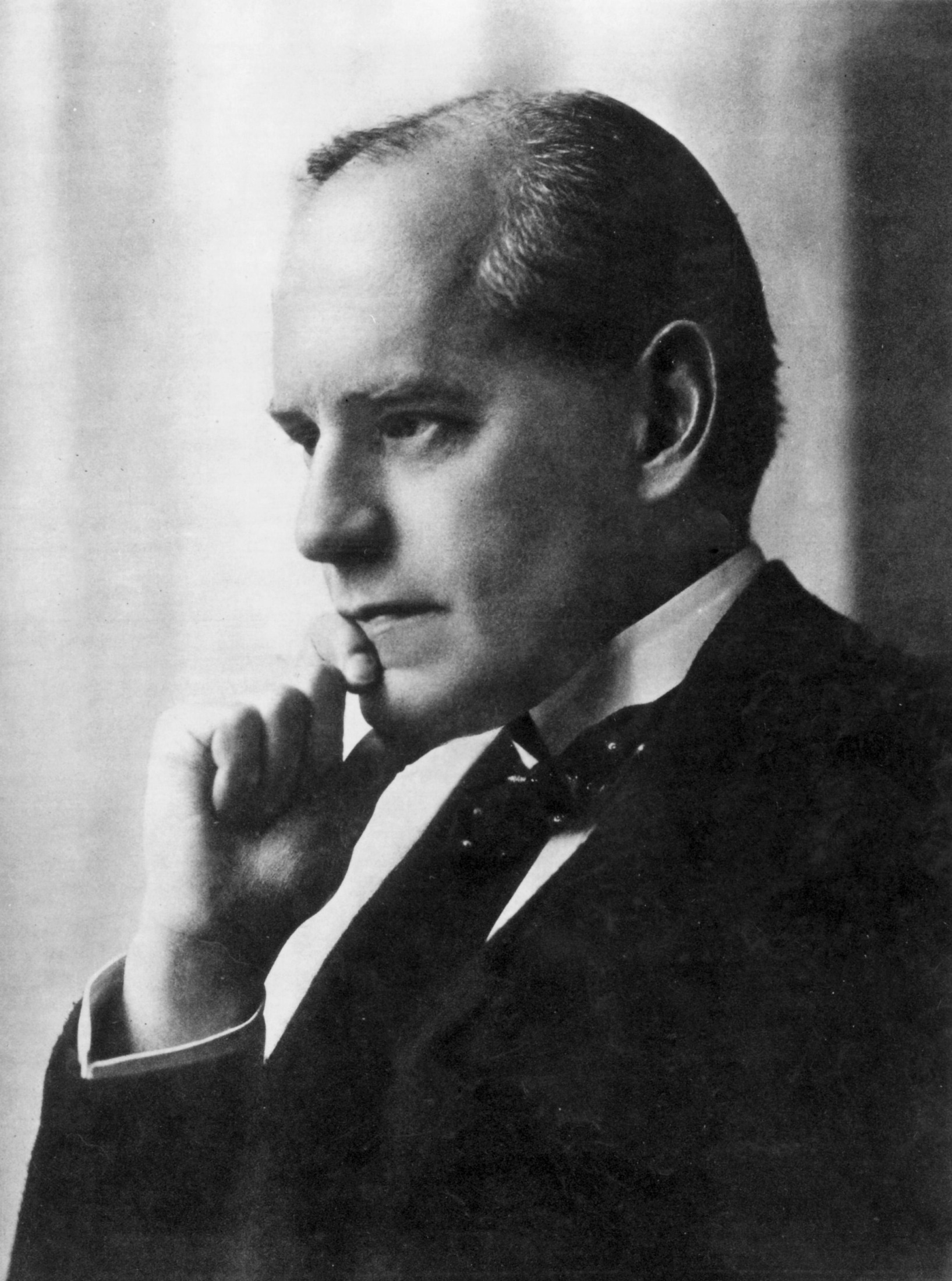
- Born: 14 August 1867; Kingston upon Thames, Surrey, England
- Died: 31 January 1933 (aged 65); Hampstead, London, England
- Occupations: Novelist and playwright
- Spouse: Ada Galsworthy (m. 1905)
- Relatives: Lilian Sauter (sister); Georg Sauter (brother-in-law); Rudolf Helmut Sauter (nephew)
- Writing career
- Notable awards: Nobel Prize in Literature; 1932

President of PEN International
- In office October 1921 – October 1933
- Succeeded by: H. G. Wells

John Galsworthy (/ˈɡɔːlzwɜːrði/; 14 August 1867 – 31 January 1933) was an English novelist and playwright. He is best known for his trilogy of novels collectively called The Forsyte Saga (1906, 1920, 1921), and two later trilogies, A Modern Comedy and End of the Chapter. He was awarded the 1932 Nobel Prize in Literature.

Born to a prosperous upper-middle-class family, Galsworthy was destined for a career as a lawyer, but found it uncongenial and turned instead to writing. He was thirty before his first book was published in 1897, and did not achieve real success until 1906, when The Man of Property, the first of his novels about the Forsyte family was published. In the same year his first play, The Silver Box was staged in London. As a dramatist, he became known for plays with a social message, reflecting, among other themes, the struggle of workers against exploitation, the use of solitary confinement in prisons, the repression of women, jingoism and the politics and morality of war.

The Forsyte family series of novels and short stories collectively known as The Forsyte Chronicles is similar in many ways to Galsworthy's family, and the patriarch, Old Jolyon, is modelled on Galsworthy's father. The main sequence runs from the late 19th century to the early 1930s, featuring three generations of the family. The books were popular when first published and their latter-day popularity was boosted considerably when BBC Television broadcast a 26-part adaptation for the author's centenary in 1967.

As well as writing plays and novels with social messages, Galsworthy campaigned continually for a wide range of causes about which he felt strongly, from animal welfare to prison reform, censorship and workers' rights. Although seen by many as a radical, he belonged to and supported no political party. His plays are seldom revived, but his novels have been frequently reissued.

== Life and career ==
=== Early years ===
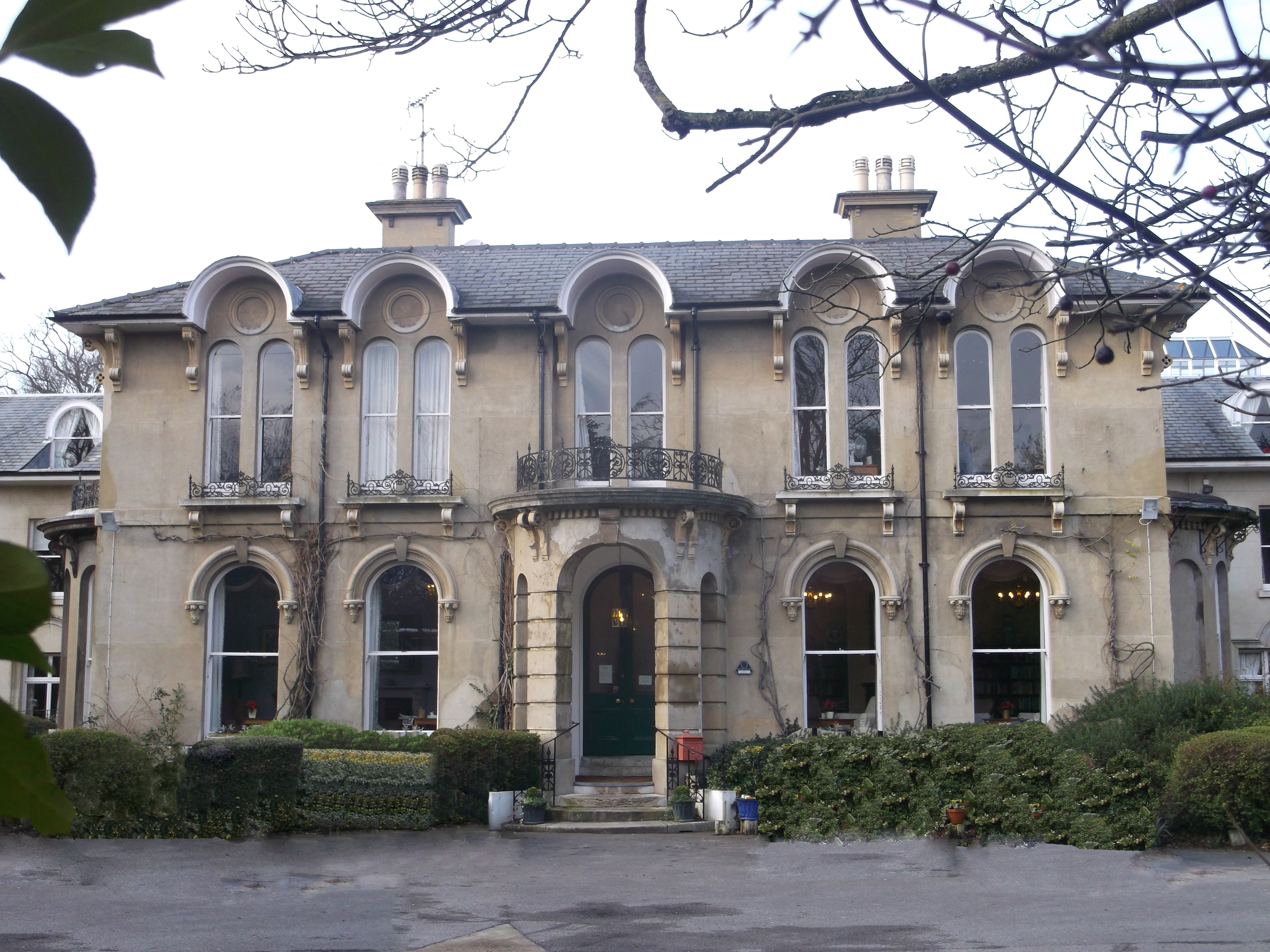
Parkfield (now Galsworthy House), the author's birthplace

John Galsworthy was born on 14 August 1867 at his family's home, Parkfield (now called Galsworthy House) on Kingston Hill in Surrey. He was the second child and elder son of the four children of John Galsworthy (Note: Galsworthy senior, like his predecessors, pronounced the surname with a short "a" as in "gallery"; his son changed the pronunciation of the first syllable to "Gaul" in the belief that the name derived from Gaulish (i.e. French) ancestry.) (1817–1904) and his wife Blanche Bailey née Bartleet (1837–1915). John senior was a London solicitor, with a flourishing practice, as well as substantial wealth inherited from his father – also John – who was from a Devonshire farming family. The latter had prospered as a ship chandler in Plymouth before moving to London and investing profitably in property. In the class-conscious mid-Victorian era, Blanche Galsworthy saw herself as being from a higher social stratum than her husband's comparatively nouveau riche family, and this, together with a 20-year age gap between them, made for an uneasy relationship. (Note: After the four children had grown up, Blanche left her husband and lived separately. The literary critic and academic Michael Molino suggests that she was the model for highly strung and emotionally aloof women in her son's novels, such as Mrs Pendyce in The Country House (1907) and Frances Freeland in The Freelands (1915).) The four children were considerably more en rapport with their father than with their mother. He became the model for Old Jolyon, the patriarch in The Forsyte Saga; looking back, Galsworthy said in 1919, "I was so truly and deeply fond of him that I seemed not to have a fair share of love left to give to my mother".

Galsworthy was educated by a governess until he was nine. In 1876 he was sent to Saugeen, a small preparatory school in Bournemouth. He was happy there, and his happiness increased when his younger brother, Hubert, was sent to join him. In the summer term of 1881 Galsworthy left Saugeen to go to Harrow School. He became a member of the school football team, and captain of his house XI. A contemporary later described him as "one of the best football players and runners there have ever been at Harrow ... a beautiful dribbler and full of pluck". His biographer David Holloway comments that in describing a character in a 1930 short story, Galsworthy was in fact describing his schoolboy self:

No one, at school, I am sure, detected in him signs of future greatness ... I think that if you had asked any of his contemporaries for their opinion of him, they would have said: "A very nice fellow, without much push, the best-dressed boy in the school, with more than ordinary athletic and artistic gifts, but never likely to make a stir in the world".

After Harrow, Galsworthy went to New College, Oxford to read law, matriculating in October 1886. His biographer Catherine Dupré calls his time at Oxford "a happy, almost frivolous, interlude in a life that was lived in general with the greatest solemnity". An Oxford contemporary recalled him as living the typical life of the well-to-do, a not very intellectual undergraduate from a leading public school. He joined the Oxford University Dramatic Society, and acted in other amateur productions, in one of which he fell in love with a fellow performer, Sybil Carlisle (later a professional actress); his ardent feelings were not reciprocated, which caused him much angst. He concluded his time at Oxford with a second-class honours degree, awarded in 1889.

=== Barrister and traveller ===
As his father wished, Galsworthy entered the legal profession. He was admitted to Lincoln's Inn and was called to the bar in the Easter term of 1890. Holloway comments that as the son of a leading solicitor, Galsworthy was in an excellent position for a young barrister. His father could put a good deal of work his way and recommend him to other solicitors. (Note: Under the prevailing legal system in England, litigants had to engage two lawyers: first a solicitor to prepare the case and then a barrister to present it in court.) He was nonetheless unenthusiastic about practising as a barrister. At his father's instigation he went with his brother Hubert on a trip across Canada, ostensibly to examine some family holdings there, but, according to Holloway, chiefly as a version of the Grand Tour, to let the brothers see something of the world.

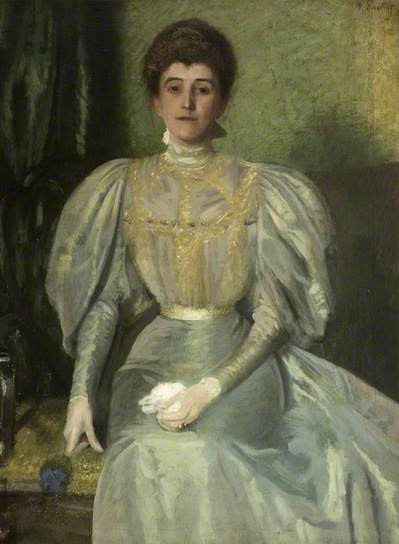
Ada Galsworthy by Georg Sauter, 1897

After returning to England in September 1891, Galsworthy had a brief, unhappy love affair. His father arranged further foreign trips to distract him from his emotional troubles and to develop his legal education by studying aspects of maritime law at close quarters with a view to specialising in it once back at home. In November 1892 Galsworthy and a friend from Oxford, Ted Sanderson, began a long trip that took them to the South Seas (where they hoped but failed to meet Robert Louis Stevenson in Samoa), Australasia and South Africa.

On the voyage from Adelaide to Cape Town, beginning in April 1893, Galsworthy met the ship's first mate, Joseph Conrad, who had yet to begin his career as a writer. The two became lifelong friends. In 1904 Galsworthy went to Russia, where his father had financial interests, before returning to England, supposedly to resume his career as a barrister. He remained unenthusiastic about working as a lawyer: "I read in various Chambers, practised almost not at all, and disliked my profession thoroughly". An obituarist in 1933 commented that despite Galsworthy's distaste for the legal profession, his study of the law left a permanent mark on his fiction, in which there are numerous court scenes, mostly leading to an outcome that does more harm than good. At this stage of his life Galsworthy was under no pressure to earn a living, having an adequate allowance from his father, but although he disapproved of an idle existence, he had no clear idea of what he wished to do.

In 1895 Galsworthy began a love affair with the wife of his cousin Arthur Galsworthy. Ada Galsworthy had married Arthur in 1891, but they had little in common and quickly drifted apart; within a year they had agreed to live separately. Until the death of John Galsworthy senior in 1904, Ada and Galsworthy kept their relationship secret, because a scandal would have distressed the old man greatly. Ada encouraged Galsworthy to become a writer, as did his two sisters, Lilian (Lily) and Mabel, close friends of Ada.

=== First books; marriage ===
Galsworthy at Wingstone

Galsworthy published his first work of fiction in 1897, when he was aged 30. It was a volume of nine short stories, From the Four Winds, printed at his own expense. The book received many favourable reviews, but sales were modest. Nevertheless, the young publisher Gerald Duckworth was willing to take a chance on Galsworthy's second book, a novel, Jocelyn, which he published in 1898. The author later dismissed his first two books as prentice works – he called From the Four Winds "that dreadful little book" – and over the next few years he honed his skills. He later said that he was writing fiction for five years before he mastered even the basic techniques. He studied the works of Turgenev and Maupassant, learning from their literary craftsmanship.

While his father remained alive, Galsworthy wrote under a pseudonym, John Sinjon, in whose name his first four books were published. His 1901 collection of short stories, A Man of Devon, included "The Salvation of Swithin Forsyte", the first episode in what he later developed into a three-generation family saga, known collectively as The Forsyte Chronicles. Two years later he began writing The Man of Property, the first novel in the sequence.

In 1904 Galsworthy's father died, and there was no longer any cause for secrecy about his son's relationship with Ada. After the funeral the couple went to stay at Wingstone, a farmhouse in the village of Manaton on the edge of Dartmoor, which he had come across when on a walking tour. It was the first of many visits they made there, and four years later Galsworthy took a long lease of part of the building, which was the couple's second home until 1923. Arthur Galsworthy sued for divorce in February 1905; the divorce was finalised on 13 September of that year and Ada married John Galsworthy ten days later. (Note: In the English divorce courts of the time there was an interval between the provisional judgement granting a divorce (the decree nisi) and the formal dissolution of the marriage (the decree absolute).) The marriage, which was childless, lasted until his death. Ada was a key figure in the life of her second husband, and his biographers have attributed to her an important influence on his development as a novelist and playwright.

=== Growing fame ===
The Island Pharisees (1904), addressing the effects of poverty and the constraints of convention − themes with which Galsworthy became much associated − received considerable praise, but it was a further two years until he had his first outstanding successes. His biographer V. H. Marrot calls 1906 Galsworthy's annus mirabilis. In March his novel The Man of Property was published by William Heinemann, and in December Harley Granville-Barker directed The Silver Box at the Royal Court Theatre in London.

The novel was reviewed enthusiastically. The Times said, "A novel of this character is new; it shows thought and determination, and an unflagging alertness, with its companion, ease, that make Mr Galsworthy's career a matter of some importance to English fiction", The Daily Telegraph said that Galsworthy had already published some good work, but "nothing quite so strong as this carefully-imagined and well-elaborated chapter in the history of smug respectability", and the Evening Standard commented that the characters are "undeniably arresting. They always stand out of the page, clear and impressive, as true flesh and blood." Other comments included "most incisive and cunningly wrought", "written with a finish which is both rare and delightful" and "a very human story of undoubted literary value". The first impression sold out within weeks and a reprint was quickly arranged by Heinemann, who remained Galsworthy's publisher for the rest of the author's career. There were there four more reprints over the next five years, including a cheap "Sixpenny Edition".

At this stage, Galsworthy had only tentative thoughts of expanding the novel into the family saga and social panorama of The Forsyte Chronicles. It was another twelve years before he wrote any more about the Forsytes. His novels in the interim included Fraternity (1909), a critique of the artificial veneer of urban life, and The Dark Flower (1913), depicting the disruptive, but sometimes creative, effects of love. Alongside his work as a novelist and playwright, Galsworthy was a vigorous campaigner for causes in which he believed. In 1912 and 1913 he carried on an effective campaign in the cause of humane slaughtering of animals killed for food.

Fellow campaigners against censorship: from top left, clockwise: J. M. Barrie; Gilbert Murray; William Archer; Harley Granville-Barker

The Silver Box was the first of 28 plays Galsworthy wrote for the professional stage. Despite the success of The Man of Property earlier in the year, it was as a dramatist that he was first widely known. In 1916 Sheila Kaye-Smith wrote, "Galsworthy takes his place in modern literature chiefly by virtue of his plays. Criticism may to a certain extent damage him as a novelist, but the most searching critics cannot leave him anything less than a great playwright". Although throughout his career Galsworthy supported no political party, The Silver Box was seen as putting him alongside Bernard Shaw and Granville-Barker as a playwright with a strong social message. The play hinged on unequal treatment before the law, depending on social class. It was well and widely reviewed, although it did only modestly at the box-office. Between 1906 and the outbreak of the First World War in 1914, Galsworthy had nine plays produced and published five novels. With the help of J. M. Barrie and Gilbert Murray he set up a committee to press for reform of the British laws imposing censorship on theatrical productions. They enlisted the strong backing of William Archer and Granville-Barker; W. S. Gilbert, Arthur Pinero and others lent their support.

Not all the early plays had overt political or polemical themes: Joy (1907) is a study of a young woman's attempts to cope with the inadequacies of her parents, and The Fugitive (1913) depicts a marriage collapsing from the incompatibility of the couple. But Strife (1909) depicts the struggle of workers in a Cornish tin mine against exploitation by the employers; Justice (1910) attacks the use of solitary confinement in prisons; the theme of The Eldest Son (1912) is the repression of women both in the family and society; The Mob (1914) focuses on jingoism and the politics and morality of war. None of these plays were box-office successes, but Galsworthy had the benefit of producers—Granville-Barker and Charles Frohman in London and Annie Horniman in Manchester—who were willing to present non-commercial plays in which they believed, as well as more profitable productions.

=== First World War ===
When the First World War began in August 1914, Galsworthy had conflicting views. He was appalled that civilised countries should be at war with each other, but thought it right to defend Belgium against German invasion. His family was directly affected by the war: his sister Lily was married to a German, the painter Georg Sauter, who was interned as an enemy alien and later expelled. Galsworthy was too old to serve in the army and felt increasingly that he was not contributing enough to the war effort. He donated his substantial American royalties to war charities, but in addition he felt impelled to offer his services in a personal capacity. He trained as a masseur and went to France as a volunteer, giving therapy to injured soldiers at the Hôpital Bénévole in Martouret, near Valence. His wife went with him, helping with the hospital's laundry. They returned to England in 1917.

Revisiting the theme of the Forsyte family in 1917, Galsworthy wrote a short story, "Indian Summer of a Forsyte" depicting the serene final days of Old Jolyon, the head of the family in The Man of Property. It was published in the 1918 collection Five Tales, which also contained "A Stoic", later to be successfully adapted for the stage as Old English.

Galsworthy resumed much of his pre-war lifestyle, combining literary output, socialising, and promoting the causes in which he believed. He supported prison reform, women's rights, a minimum wage and animal welfare, and opposed censorship, exploitation of workers, blood sports and aerial warfare. (Note: Galsworthy compiled a list of causes about which he had campaigned: abolition of the censorship of plays; aeroplanes in war; caging of wild birds; "Cecil houses" [social housing]; children on the stage; dental experiments on dogs; divorce law reform; docking of horses' tails; labour unrest – labour exchanges; performing animals; pigeon shooting; plumage bill; ponies in mines; prison reform (closed cell confinement); slaughterhouse reform; slum clearance; sweated industries − minimum wage; three year average income tax; vivisection of dogs; woman's suffrage; worn-out horse traffic; zoos.) He had included essays on some of these topics in his 1916 collection A Sheaf. Towards the end of 1917 he was offered a knighthood, which he declined, on the grounds that "no artist of Letters ought to dally with titles". Officials mistakenly left his name in the published 1918 New Year Honours list, and at his insistence a correction was issued.

=== Postwar ===
In 1919 the American Academy of Arts and Letters invited Galsworthy to give an address at the celebrations marking the centenary of James Russell Lowell. In his speech, at the Ritz-Carlton Hotel, Galsworthy praised Lowell for his contribution to making English the universal language—"that most superb instrument for the making of word-music, for the telling of the truth, and the expression of the imagination."

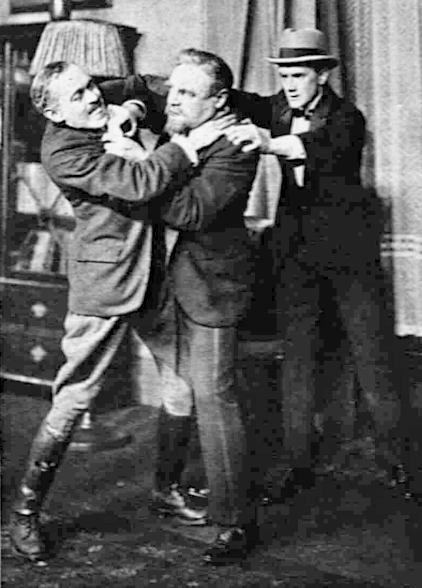
The Skin Game, 1920: violence erupts. Edmund Gwenn, centre, with George Eldon left, and Frederick Cooper

At the St Martin's Theatre, London, in 1920 Galsworthy had his first big box-office success with The Skin Game, depicting the clash between old and new money, attempted blackmail, and the effect of unrestrained capitalism on the lives of ordinary people. Reviews were generally favourable, although The Evening Standard said that the author's dramatic genius lent undeserved credibility to an essentially unrealistic plot, and The Observer commented that instead of seeing the good in both sides of an argument as he usually did, Galsworthy here depicted the bad in both. Archer wrote that the play contained some of the most thrilling passages in modern drama, and showed Galsworthy to be a born dramatist. Another reviewer called it "unrivalled among present productions ... the finest play London has seen for years." The success of the play quickly led to a Broadway production and a film version featuring the West End cast, headed by Edmund Gwenn.

By this time Galsworthy had returned to the Forsytes; he wrote a second novel about the family, In Chancery, published in October 1920. Within a year he completed another Forsyte short story (or "interlude"), called "Awakening", and a third novel, To Let, published in September 1921. A month later the International PEN Club (standing for "Poets, Essayists, Novelists") was founded in London, with Galsworthy as its president, a position he held for the rest of his life. In May 1922, the three Forsyte novels were issued in a single volume as The Forsyte Saga, and sold prodigiously—more than two million copies within months of publication, according to one account, although Galsworthy's major biographers do not give a figure.

Having concluded The Forsyte Saga, Galsworthy turned to the next generation of the family. The first instalment of a second trilogy—The White Monkey—was published in October 1924, a few days after the premiere of Galsworthy's drama, Old English. The starring role in the play, Sylvanus Heythorpe, was played in London by Norman McKinnel and in New York by George Arliss. The latter starred in a film adaptation in 1930. The day before the play opened in London, Lily Sauter died. The Galsworthys took her son Rudolf and his wife, Viola, with them for a prolonged winter holiday in Italy and North Africa.

=== Later years ===
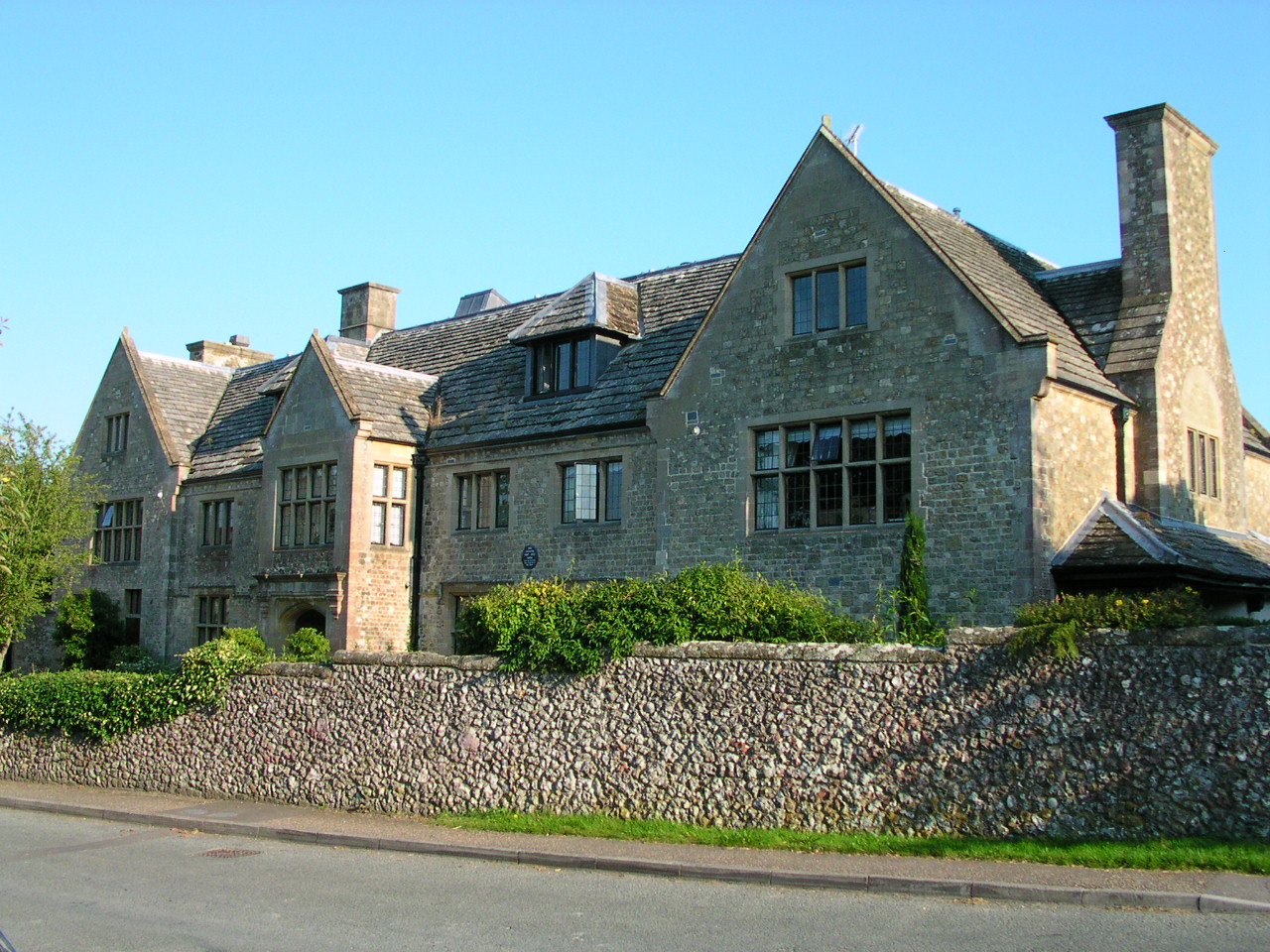
Bury House

Galsworthy's lease of Wingstone ended in 1923, to his regret and his wife's relief (she found the Devon weather bad for her bronchitis). They were without a country home for three years until in September 1926 they discovered and bought Bury House in Bury, West Sussex, a village off the A29, four miles north of Arundel. The house has extensive views across farmland to the South Downs, where Galsworthy used to ride. At Bury, the Galsworthys entertained his friends and colleagues, including Arnold Bennett and Hugh Walpole; the latter was much taken with the house: "really lovely, with pearl-grey stone fronting lawns that run straight to the open fields ... Everything artistic ... Very like a special edition of one of John's own books". Galsworthy and Ada divided their time between Bury and their London home in Hampstead; Rudolf and Viola Sauter moved from London and lived at Bury House the year round.

Between 1926 and 1928 Galsworthy worked on the second Forsyte trilogy. The Silver Spoon was published in 1926 and Swan Song in 1928. He interspersed the novels with two short "interludes": A Silent Wooing (1926) and Passers By (1927). They were published in a single volume as A Modern Comedy in 1929. Sales were disappointing—fewer than those of The Forsyte Saga as a single volume seven years earlier.

In 1929 Galsworthy was offered the Order of Merit. Although it is a more prestigious honour than a knighthood, it confers no title, and Galsworthy accepted it, receiving the award along with the Poet Laureate, Robert Bridges. Over the following three years he received honorary degrees from five universities, including Oxford, where he delivered the 1931 Romanes Lecture taking as his subject "Shakespeare and Spiritual Life".

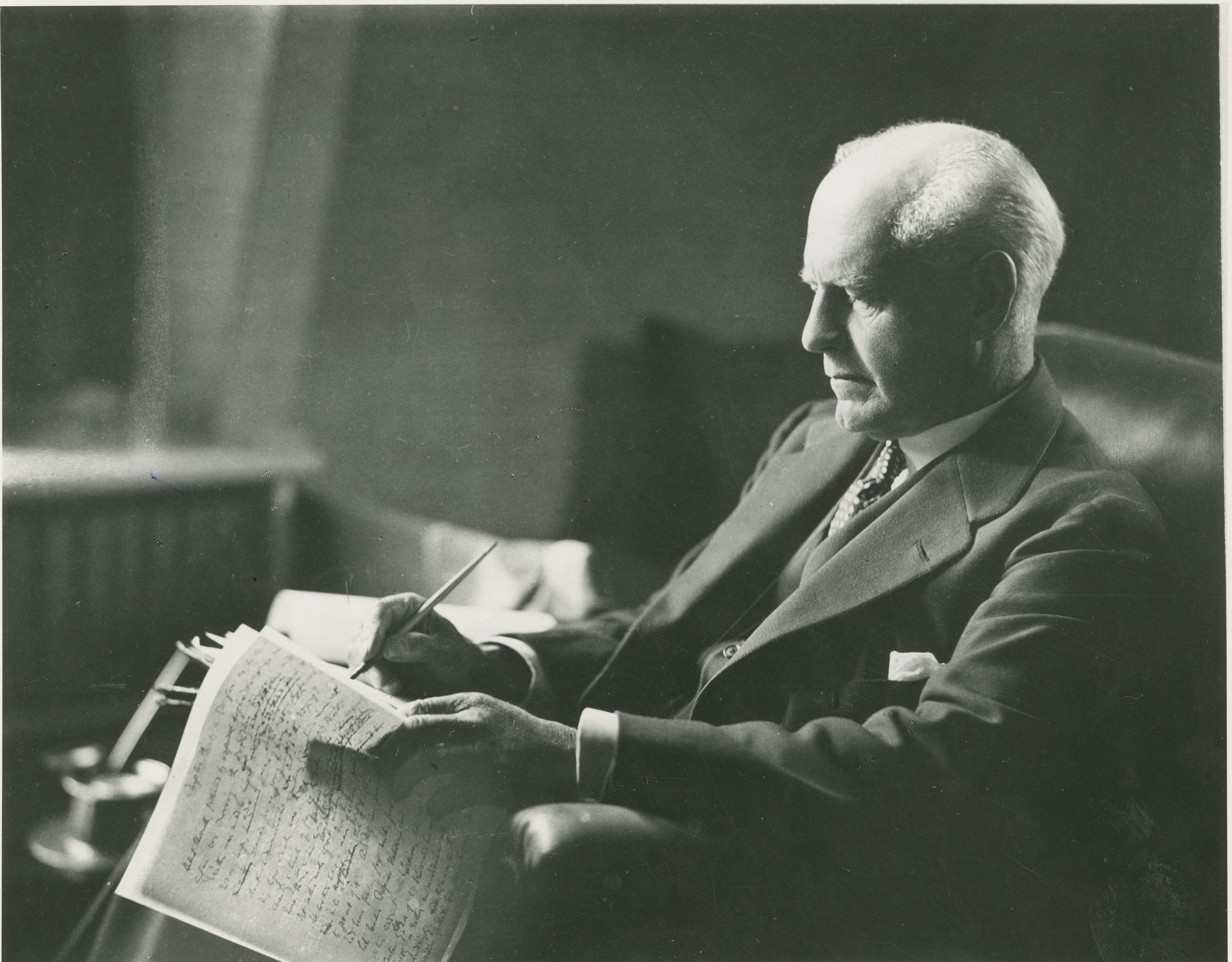
1930 portrait photo of John Galsworthy

Galsworthy found himself drawn back to the Forsyte family, and in 1930 he published On Forsyte 'Change, a collection of short stories about them, dealing with events before and soon after those recorded in the Saga. In his foreword he wrote, "it is hard to part suddenly and finally from those with whom one has lived so long; and ... these footnotes do really, I think, help to fill in and round out the chronicles of the Forsyte family". In 1931 he began what developed into a third and last trilogy, with Maid in Waiting, followed by Flowering Wilderness (1932) and the posthumously published Over the River (1933). This final trilogy, published together as End of the Chapter in 1935, moves the focus towards the Charwell family, related by marriage to the Forsytes. It sold well, although not matching the commercial or critical success of the Saga.

Galsworthy's health declined as he was working on Over the River, and, hitherto a fluent writer, he found progress slow and effortful. In late 1932 he was awarded the Nobel Prize in Literature, only the second English author to receive the award since its inception in 1901. (Note: The first English author to receive the prize was Rudyard Kipling, in 1907. Between the two awards, the prize had gone to three non-English authors who wrote in English: W. B. Yeats (1923), Bernard Shaw (1925), and Sinclair Lewis (1930); Rabindranath Tagore (1913) also sometimes wrote in English.) The citation for Galsworthy's award was "for his distinguished art of narration which takes its highest form in The Forsyte Saga". He was by then too ill to go to Stockholm for the presentation, and died at his London home on 31 January 1933, aged 65, from a combination of causes including cerebral thrombosis, arterial sclerosis and a possible brain tumour.

After a private funeral and cremation, a memorial service was held at Westminster Abbey, attended by members of the Cabinet including the prime minister, Ramsay MacDonald, European ambassadors, fellow authors including Sir James Barrie, Laurence Binyon, Walter de la Mare and Sir Arthur Pinero, and representatives of numerous charities that Galsworthy had supported. In accordance with his will, his ashes were scattered from an aeroplane over the South Downs.

== Works ==
Galsworthy wrote 20 novels; 28 completed plays; five collections of short stories; three volumes of poetry; eleven volumes of essays and sketches; and occasional stories and pamphlets, newspaper articles, unpublished essays and sketches. He wrote in longhand, revised extensively, and his wife—the only secretary he ever had—typed his completed manuscripts.

=== Novels ===
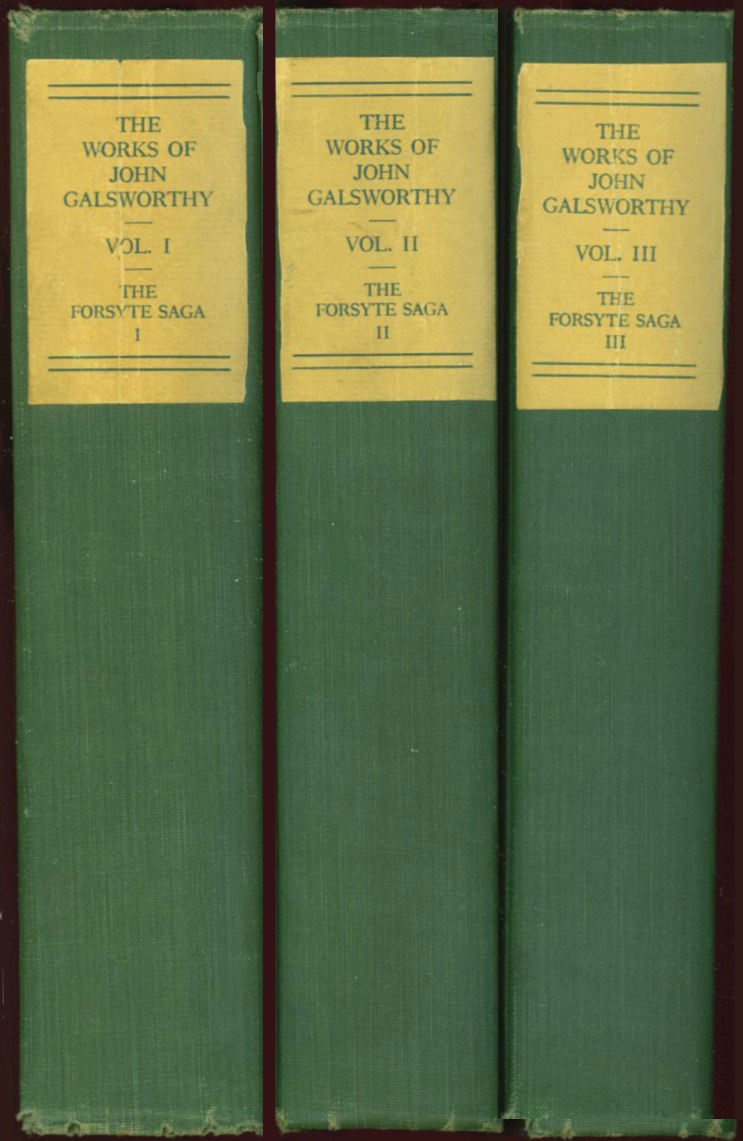
Galsworthy's The Forsyte Saga

Of Galsworthy's 20 novels, nine are about the Forsytes, the last three tangentially so, and the other eleven are all one-off stories. In a 1982 study, Alec Fréchet analyses a comment that Galsworthy made in looking back at his works in the mid-1920s, that the novels reflected the battle between the emotional and critical sides of his nature:

My early work was certainly more emotional than critical. But from 1901 came nine years when the critical was, in the main, holding sway. From 1910 to 1918 the emotional again struggled for the upper hand; and from that time on there seems to have been something of a "dead heat".

From this, Fréchet divides the novels into five periods: the first consisting of the two early ones, Jocelyn (1898) and Villa Rubein (1900). Between 1901 and 1909 there were four novels characterised as "critical"—The Island Pharisees (1904), The Man of Property (1906), The Country House (1907) and Fraternity (1909). These books reflect the author's disparaging view of various aspects of British society, such as hypocrisy, selfishness and exploitation of the poor and women of all classes. His censure was seen in conservative circles as scandalous, and the author was regarded by some as a traitor to his own class. He further offended conservatives by his attacks on imperialism; in The Island Pharisees he wrote, "Why should we, a small portion of the world's population, assume that our standards are the proper ones for every kind of race?"

The next period, from 1910 to 1919, produced six novels categorised as "lyrical" or "war-time": The Patrician (1911), The Dark Flower (1913), The Freelands (1915), Beyond (1917), The Burning Spear (1919) and Saint's Progress (1919). After these Fréchet lists the 1920–1928 Forsyte novels as a category of their own: In Chancery (1920), To Let (1921), The White Monkey (1924), The Silver Spoon (1926) and Swan Song (1928). The last group in Fréchet's summary of Galsworthy's classifications consists of the final trilogy: Maid in Waiting (1931), Flowering Wilderness (1932) and Over the River (completed in 1932).

Fréchet comments that the recurring themes of Galsworthy's novels are, in order of importance: beauty, love and suffering, divorce, honour, art and the law. "Beauty comes first, because in every case it coincides with love: the beloved woman is always very beautiful; but not only women: the natural setting for the action is also unfailingly lovely. The beauty of a woman and the beauty of nature are of the same kind." Money and family are important features, but generally as the background to, rather than the crux of, the plot.

=== Plays ===
Galsworthy's plays

• The Silver Box, 1906
• Joy, 1907
• Strife, 1909
• Justice, 1910
• The Little Dream, 1911
• The Pigeon, 1912
• The Eldest Son, 1912
• The Fugitive, 1913
• The Mob, 1914
• A Bit o' Love, 1915
• The Foundations, 1916
• The Skin Game, 1920
• Six Short Plays, 1921 (Note: The six plays are The First and the Last, The Little Man, Hall-Marked, Defeat, The Sun and Punch and Go.)
• A Family Man, 1921
• Loyalties, 1922
• Windows, 1922
• The Forest , 1924
• Old English, 1924
• The Show, 1925
• Escape, 1926
• The Silver Spoon, 1926
• Exiled, 1929
• The Roof, 1929.

Like his contemporary Somerset Maugham, Galsworthy was known more in his early career for his plays than for his novels. Unlike Maugham, who abandoned the theatre thirty years before the end of his writing career, Galsworthy continued writing plays, from The Silver Box in 1906 to The Roof in 1929. As with Maugham, the plays are rarely revived, although the Forsyte Saga and some other novels have been regularly reissued.

As a playwright, Galsworthy presented social issues of the time in the manner of the modernist school of Henrik Ibsen. Encouraged by Granville-Barker, Galsworthy wrote about conflicts and inequities within British society. Shaw did the same, but the styles of the two dramatists differed noticeably. The Times commented that Galsworthy was a dramatist of power with more feeling than Shaw, if less wit, "and as keen a sense of social anomalies, if less readiness to offer theories by which they might be remedied." Shaw favoured a forthright presentation of his themes; Galsworthy and Granville-Barker preferred a more subtle, naturalistic approach, which, Shaw said, "makes me blush for the comparative blatancy of my own plays". Galsworthy seldom took sides; he was known for seeing both sides of most arguments and rarely giving any characters a monopoly of virtue or wisdom. The literary critic and academic Michael Molino summarises Galsworthy's technique:

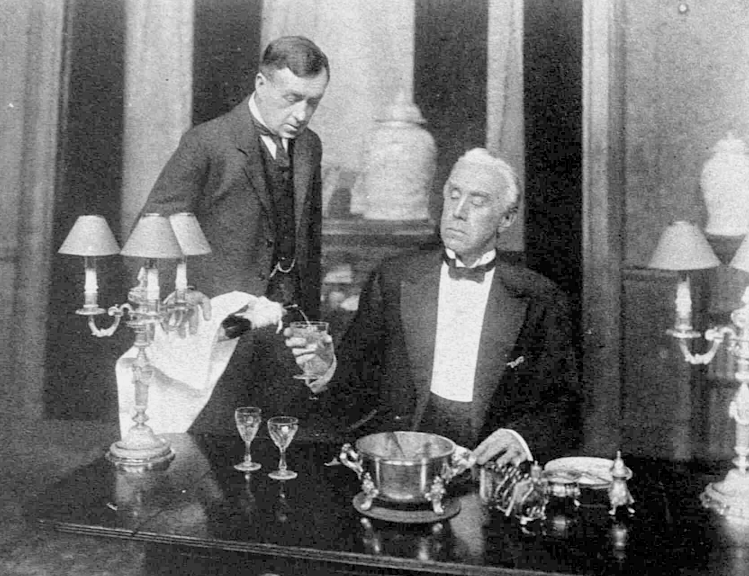
Old English, 1924: Ventnor (Laurence Hanray) serves Heythorp (Norman McKinnel) his last dinner

a dramatic situation presents the central thesis of the play; the action is then propelled through realistic dialogue and detail, and the conclusion poses a question to consider rather than presenting a certain resolution to the play's problem.

Not all Galsworthy's plays are of this kind. Two were his adaptations of earlier short stories: The First and the Last (1921) and Old English (1924), which dealt respectively with murder and suicide—the latter by the unconventional method of overeating: the play culminates in the death of the central character, who, faced with imminent ruin and disgrace, defies his doctor's orders and deliberately eats a fatally rich and elaborate dinner, with many courses and as many wines. These were exceptions: normally Galsworthy conceived his plots and characters as suitable either for drama or for fiction, but not both.

Some critics felt that Galsworthy was apt to show the underdog in a sympathetic light even when the character deserved little sympathy. Windows (1923), centring on a vicious young woman, led the reviewer in The Times to quote Samuel Johnson: "Sir, do not accustom your mind to confound virtue and vice."

=== Other writing ===
Galsworthy was an accomplished writer of short stories; the most popular collection is Five Tales (1918). Opinions vary about his poetry. In The Oxford Dictionary of National Biography (2004), Geoffrey Harvey considers that Galsworthy's poems rarely transcend the conventional. Gilbert Murray thought that the Collected Poems, posthumously published, showed that Galsworthy could have been a considerable poet if he had not already found his milieu in prose.

Harvey judges Galsworthy's essays and published lectures to be "thoughtful but unremarkable".

== Honours ==
In addition to the Order of Merit and the Nobel Prize, Galsworthy received honorary degrees from the universities of Cambridge, Dublin, Manchester, Oxford, Princeton, Sheffield and St Andrews, and was an honorary fellow of New College, Oxford.

== Reputation ==
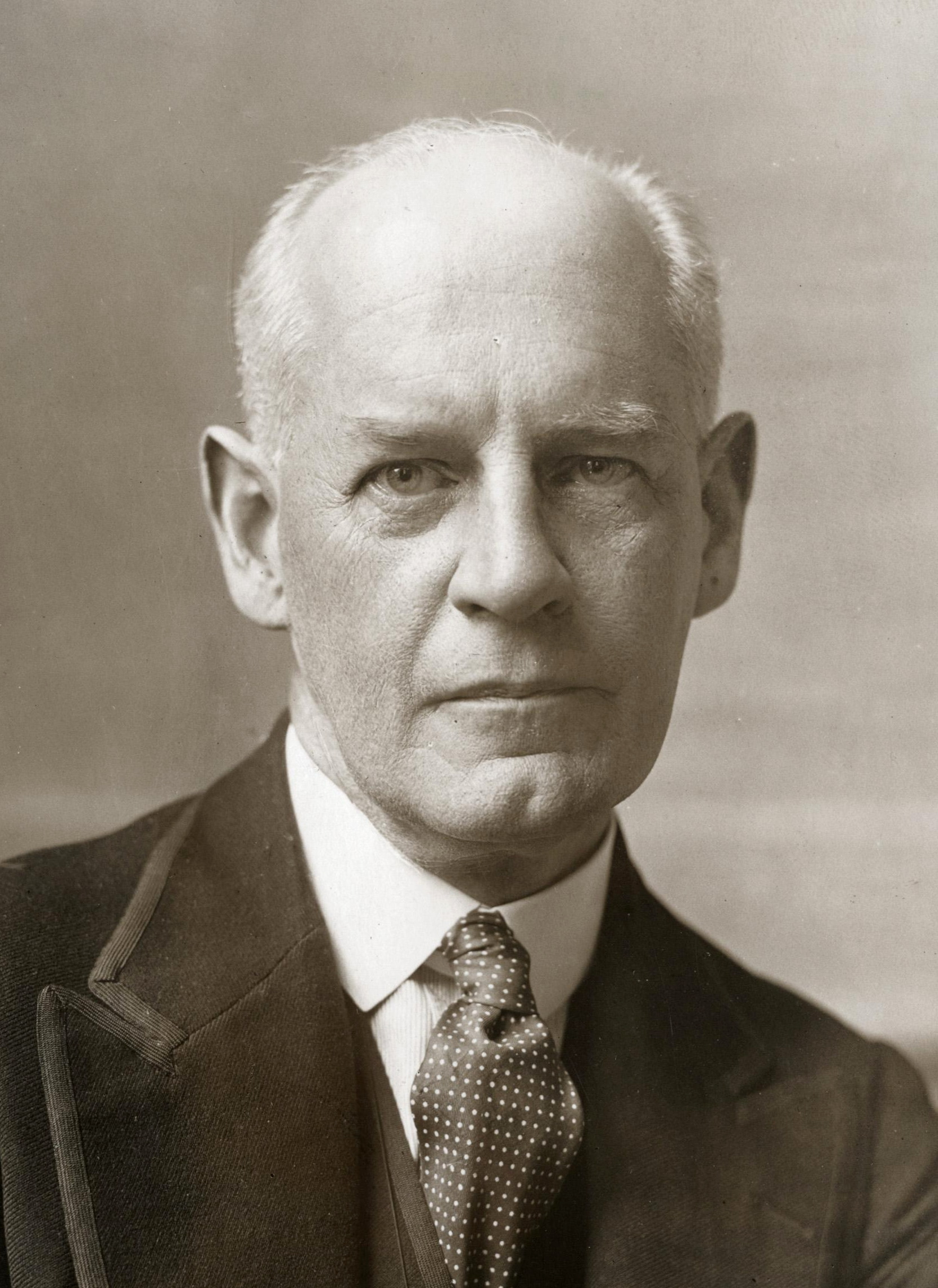
Galsworthy in later years

Galsworthy was known for his generosity. He insisted on living on only half his income, and gave the other half away in such causes as providing affordable homes for villagers in Manaton and Bury. Walpole described him as "gentle, honest and just" and "absolutely good-hearted ... a dear", although somewhat over-serious: "A dinner with Galsworthy, Lucas, and Granville-Barker was quite fun although J. G. never sees a joke". P. G. Wodehouse confirmed this reputation for seriousness; he wrote that Galsworthy abominated desultory conversation, and when he and his wife were entertaining dinner guests he would announce, as they sat down, a topic that would be discussed during the meal, such as "To what extent is genius influenced by the educational standards of parents?" (Note: Galsworthy nonetheless was consistently enthusiastic about Wodehouse's comic novels, one of his few tastes that Ada did not share.)

The literary modernists of his day deplored Galsworthy's books, and those of his contemporaries H. G. Wells and Arnold Bennett. Virginia Woolf called them "the Edwardians" and accused them of presiding over an "age when character disappeared or was mysteriously engulfed". In her view, according to Molino, the three "ignored the complex internal life of characters" and portrayed "an orderly existence populated with characters typical of their social station, but little else." Of the three it was Galsworthy whom Woolf most disliked. When his death was announced she wrote of her thankfulness that "that stuffed shirt" had died. In 1927 D. H. Lawrence, although, in Fréchet's phrase, "undaunted by his lack of knowledge of the subject", published an attack on Galsworthy. "The story is feeble, the characters have no blood and bones, the emotions are faked, faked, faked. It is one great fake."

The publisher Rupert Hart-Davis thought that Galsworthy's touch grew less sure with each succeeding generation of the Forsytes: in the Saga the author could draw on his contemporaries and immediate forebears as models: the Forsytes are an upper-middle-class family like Galsworthy's own, two generations removed from their yeomen roots in the West Country; Ada's first marriage provided a basis for Irene and Soames Forsyte. But in Hart-Davis's view, in the later novels Galsworthy had to rely on his creative imagination, "which by itself wasn't powerful enough to mask his ignorance of his juniors: perhaps if he'd had children the later books would have rung truer."

In his 1979 study John Galsworthy: l'homme, le romancier, le critique social, Fréchet wrote that Galsworthy's reputation is not the same in Britain as it is elsewhere: "for the English, Galsworthy represents the past, because they are so conscious of all that is anachronistic in the world he describes, and of how fast it is all changing." Fréchet suggests that readers from other countries "are much better at perceiving what remains true in Galsworthy's depiction of England, because they realise how slowly it has changed."

Marking the centenary of Galsworthy's birth, the BBC made a television adaptation of the first two trilogies, screened in 1967 under the title The Forsyte Saga. It was at the time the most expensive television production ever made, with 26 episodes of 50 minutes each. It attracted large audiences in Britain and forty other countries, and led to a surge in the sale of Galsworthy's novels, which sold better than at any stage in his lifetime; Penguin Books sold more than 100,000 copies of The Man of Property in Britain in 1967 and more than 120,000 the following year. New translations brought the author a new international public.

== List of Works ==
=== The Forsyte Chronicles ===
1. The Salvation of a Forsyte (The Salvation of Swithin Forsyte) (1900)
2. On Forsyte 'Change (1930) (re-published 1986 as "Uncollected Forsyte")
3. Danaë (1905–06) in Forsytes, Pendyces, and Others (1935)
4. The Man of Property (1906) – first book of The Forsyte Saga (1922)
5. The Country House (1907)
6. "Indian Summer of a Forsyte" (1918) – first interlude of The Forsyte Saga in Five Tales (1918)
7. In Chancery (1920) – second book of The Forsyte Saga
8. "Awakening" (1920) – second interlude of The Forsyte Saga
9. To Let (1921) – third book of The Forsyte Saga
10. The White Monkey (1924) – first book of A Modern Comedy (1929)
11. The Silver Spoon (1926) – second book of A Modern Comedy
12. "A Silent Wooing" (1927) – first Interlude of A Modern Comedy
13. "Passers-By" (1927) – second Interlude of A Modern Comedy
14. Swan Song (1928) – third book of A Modern Comedy
15. Maid in Waiting (1931) – first book of End of the Chapter (1934)
16. Flowering Wilderness (1932) – second book of End of the Chapter
17. One More River (originally Over the River) (1933) – third book of End of the Chapter

=== Novels ===
- Jocelyn, 1898 (as John Sinjohn)
- Villa Rubein, 1900 (as John Sinjohn)
- The Island Pharisees, 1904
- Fraternity, 1909
- A Motley, 1910
- The Dark Flower, 1913
- The Freelands, 1915
- A Sheaf, 1916
- Beyond, 1917
- Saint's Progress, 1919
- Captures, 1923
- The Burning Spear, 2002

=== Short Story Collections ===
- From the Four Winds, 1897 (as John Sinjohn)
- A Man of Devon, 1901 (as John Sinjohn)
- Villa Rubein and Other Stories, 1909
- Five Tales, 1918 (Contents: "The First and Last", "A Stoic", "The Apple Tree", "The Juryman", and "Indian Summer of a Forsyte" (the first interlude of The Forsyte Saga)
- Tatterdemalion, 1920
- Captures, 1923
- Caravan: The Assembled Tales of John Galsworthy, New York: Charles Scribner's Sons 1925
- Soames and the Flag, 1930
- Forsytes, Pendyces and Others, 1935
- " Quality" , 1912

=== Plays ===
- The Silver Box, 1906
- Strife, 1909
- Joy, 1909
- Justice, 1910
- The Little Dream, 1911
- The Patrician, 1911
- The Pigeon, 1912
- The Eldest Son, 1912
- The Fugitive, 1913
- The Mob, 1914
- The Little Man, 1915
- A Bit o' Love, 1915
- The Foundations, 1917
- The First and the Last, 1919
- The Skin Game, 1920
- A Family Man, 1922
- Loyalties, 1922
- Windows, 1922
- Old English, 1923
- Escape, 1926
- Punch and Go, 1935

=== Essays ===
- Quality, 1912,
- The Inn of Tranquility, 1912,
- Addresses in America, 1912
- Two Essays on Conrad, 1930

=== Collected Works ===
- The Manaton Edition, 1923–26 (30 vols.)
- The Grove Edition, 1927–34 (27 Vols.)

=== Other works ===
- A Commentary, 1908
- A Justification for the Censorship of Plays, 1909
- The Japanese Quince, 1910
- The Spirit of Punishment, 1910
- Horses in Mines, 1910
- Moods, Songs, and Doggerels, 1912
- For Love of Beasts, 1912
- Treatment of Animals, 1913
- The Slaughter of Animals For Food, 1913
- Abracadabra, 1924
- The Forest, 1924
- Old English, 1924
- The Show, 1925
- Verses New and Old, 1926 (poems)
- Castles in Spain, 1927
- Bambi, Mar 16, 1928, wrote the foreword to Felix Salten's now famous novel
- Exiled, 1929
- The Roof, 1929
- The Creation of Character in Literature, 1931 (The Romanes Lecture for 1931).
- Forty Poems, 1932
- Autobiographical Letters of Galsworthy: A Correspondence with Frank Harris, 1933
- Collected Poems, 1934
- The Life and Letters, 1935
- The Winter Garden, 1935
- Selected Short Stories, 1935
- Glimpses and Reflections, 1937
- Galsworthy's Letters to Leon Lion, 1968
- Letters from John Galsworthy 1900–1932, 1970

== Notes, references and sources ==
=== Sources ===
- Bishop, Edward (1989). A Virginia Woolf Chronology. London: Macmillan. ISBN 978-1-349-07883-7.
- Cherry, Bridget; Pevsner, Nikolaus (1983). The Buildings of England, London 2: South. Harmondsworth: Penguin Books. ISBN 978-0-14-071047-2.
- Cooper, Robert (1998). The Literary Guide & Companion to Southern England. Athens, Ohio: Ohio University Press. ISBN 978-0-8214-1225-1.
- Drabble, Margaret (1974). Arnold Bennett. London: Weidenfeld & Nicolson. ISBN 978-0-297-76733-6.
- Drabble, Margaret (1985). The Oxford Companion to English Literature. Oxford: Oxford University Press. ISBN 978-0-19-866130-6.
- Dupré, Catherine (1976). John Galsworthy: A Biography. London: Collins. ISBN 978-0-00-211392-2.
- Eagle, Dorothy; Carnell, Hilary (1977). The Oxford Literary Guide to the British Isles. Oxford: Clarendon Press. ISBN 978-0-19-869123-5.
- Fisher, John (1976). The World of the Forsytes. London: Secker & Warburg. ISBN 0-436-15704-7.
- Fréchet, Alec (1982) [1979]. John Galsworthy A Reassessment. London: Palgrave Macmillan. ISBN 978-1-34-905995-9.
- Galsworthy, John (1916). A Sheaf. London: Heinemann. OCLC 1039945106.
- Galsworthy, John (1930). On Forsyte 'Change. London: Heinemann. OCLC 1077958931.
- Gindin, James (1987). John Galsworthy's Life And Art: An Alien's Fortress. Basingstoke: Macmillan. ISBN 978-0-333-40812-4.
- Hart-Davis, Rupert (1997) [1952]. Hugh Walpole. Stroud: Sutton. ISBN 978-0-7509-1491-8.
- Holloway, David (1968). John Galsworthy. London: Morgan Grampian. ISBN 978-0-249-43974-8.
- Holroyd, Michael (1997). Bernard Shaw: The One-Volume Definitive Edition. London: Chatto & Windus. ISBN 978-0-7011-6279-5.
- Howarth, Barry (2016). The Craft of Arnold Bennett (PDF) (Thesis). Liverpool: University of Liverpool. OCLC 1063646459.
- Kaye-Smith, Sheila (1916). John Galsworthy. London: Nisbet. OCLC 25115953.
- Lyttelton, George; Rupert Hart-Davis (1978). The Lyttelton Hart-Davis Letters, Volume I. London: John Murray. ISBN 978-0-7195-3478-2.
- Marrot, H. V. (1935). The Life and Letters of John Galsworthy. London: Heinemann. OCLC 486573.
- Morgan, Ted (1980). Maugham. New York: Simon & Schuster. ISBN 978-0-67-150581-3. OCLC 1036531202.
- Mottram, R. H. (1956). For Some We Loved: an Intimate Portrait of Ada and John Galsworthy. London: Hutchinson.
- Mottram, R. H. (1953). John Galsworthy. Writers and Their Work No. 38. London: Longmans Green & Co.
- Raphael, Frederic (1989). Somerset Maugham. London: Thames and Hudson. OCLC 658161005.
- Steele, Elizabeth (1972). Hugh Walpole. London: Twayne. ISBN 978-0-8057-1560-6.
- Wodehouse, P. G.; Guy Bolton (1980). Wodehouse on Wodehouse. London: Hutchinson. ISBN 978-0-09-143210-2.

Non-profit organization positions
Preceded by None	International President of PEN International; 1921–1933	Succeeded by H. G. Wells
