= The Eldest Son =

Play by John Galsworthy

- Original language: English
- Written by: John Galsworthy
- Genre: Drama

Premiere
- Date: 23 November 1912
- Place: Kingsway Theatre, London

The Eldest Son is a 1912 play by the British writer John Galsworthy.

Although first written in 1909, it was until three years later that a version was produced. It ran for 47 performances at the Kingsway Theatre in London's West End between 23 November 1912 and 10 January 1913. The cast included Robert Rendel, Claude King, Moffat Johnston, Irene Rooke and Cathleen Nesbitt.

== Bibliography ==
- Wearing, J.P. The London Stage 1910–1919: A Calendar of Productions, Performers, and Personnel.. Rowman & Littlefield, 2013.
