= Manaton =

Village in Devon, England

Coordinates: 50°37′N 3°46′W

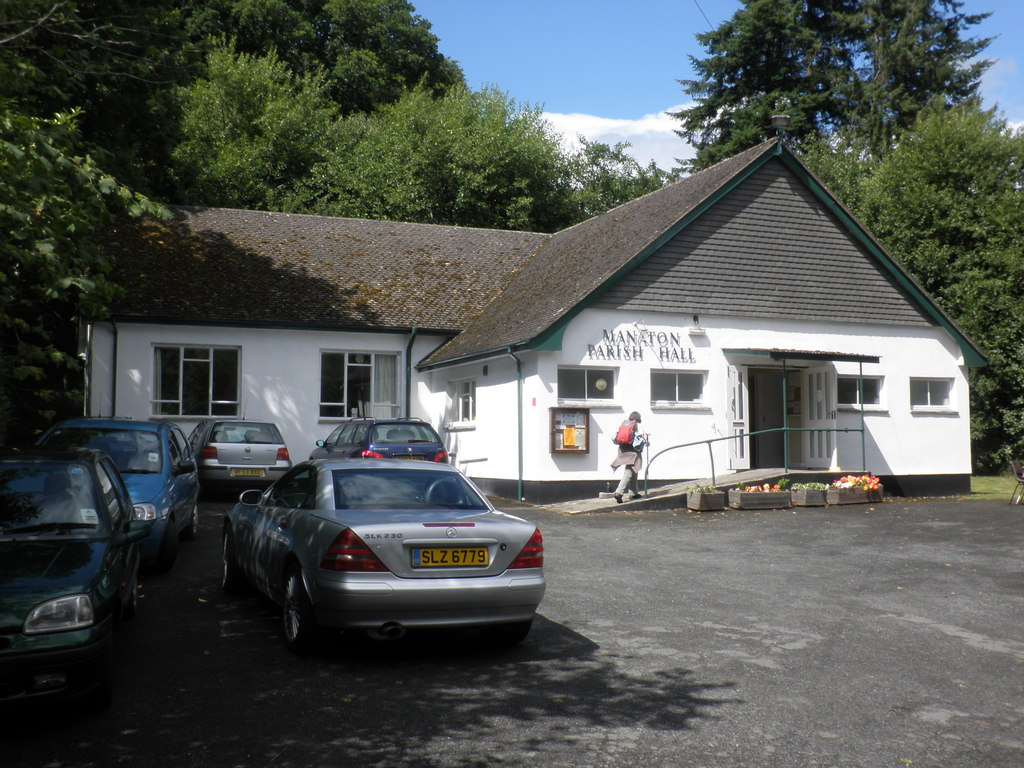
Manaton Parish Hall

Manaton is a village and civil parish in Teignbridge District, situated to the southeast of Dartmoor National Park, Devon, England.

The 15th-century church, located in a prominent spot due north of the village green, is dedicated to St Winifred. Three of the six bells in its tower are medieval – markings on the oldest indicate that it was made by London bellmaker Johanna Hill around 1440–1450, making them at least as ancient as the tower. They are still being rung today on a regular basis by the local team of bellringers. Its rood screen was carved in around 1500, but as is the case with many old English Churches, the figures, both painted and carved in wood, were defaced during the Reformation. Much of the original screen does still exist however, its wood carving having been first restored by the Pinwill sisters in the late nineteenth century and again in 1981 by the late Anna Hulbert.

A granite cross once stood in the churchyard, but was destroyed in the mid-19th century by the vicar, Rev. John Charles Carwithen. He did so because he disapproved of what he considered to be a superstitious custom of carrying coffins three times around the cross before burial.

In 1890 and 1892, extensive restoration work was carried out by the prolific church architect George Fellowes Prynne. Prynne's brother, Edward Arthur Fellowes Prynne, a notable late Pre-Raphaelite artist and designer, created the painted panels in the reredos behind the altar.

Between 1903 and 1923, the writer John Galsworthy and his wife Ada Galsworthy frequently stayed in a farmhouse called Wingstone in the village. It was here that he was inspired by the nearby Jay's Grave and its legend to write his short story The Apple Tree in 1916.

Manaton was known as the `ton in local dialect.

== See also ==
- Corpse road
- Ambrose Manaton, a Cornishman, was an MP for Launceston, Cornwall
- Villages in England
- Dartmoor National Park
