= Eastern Daily Press =

Regional newspaper covering Norfolk and parts of Suffolk and Cambridgeshire

- Type: Daily newspaper
- Format: Compact (ex-broadsheet)
- Owner: USA Today Co.
- Publisher: Newsquest
- Editor: Richard Porritt
- Founded: 1870
- Headquarters: Norwich
- Circulation: 11,778 (as of 2024)
- Website: edp24.co.uk

The Eastern Daily Press (EDP) is a regional newspaper covering Norfolk, northern parts of Suffolk and eastern Cambridgeshire, and is published daily in Norwich, UK. The paper also produces a sister edition, the Norwich Evening News.

== History ==
Founded in 1870 as a broadsheet called the Eastern Counties Daily Press, it changed its name to the Eastern Daily Press in 1872. It switched to the compact (tabloid) format in the mid-1990s. The paper is now owned and published by Newsquest. In 2022, Newsquest took over the newspaper's former publisher Archant, formerly known as Eastern Counties Newspapers Group.

== Notable editors and former journalists ==
- Edmund Rogers - founding editor, 1870–73
- Keiron Pim, biographer, author of Endless Flight: The Life of Joseph Roth
