= Rudolf Helmut Sauter =

German born painter, printmaker, illustrator, & poet (1895-1977)

- Born: 9 May 1895
- Died: 12 June 1977 (aged 82); Stroud, Gloucestershire, England
- Other names: R.H. Sauter
- Education: Harrow School
- Occupations: Painter; illustrator; printmaker; poet
- Spouse: Viola Brookman
- Parents: Georg Sauter (father); Lilian Galsworthy (mother)
- Relatives: John Galsworthy (uncle); Ada Galsworthy (aunt)

Rudolf Helmut Sauter (9 May 1895 – 12 June 1977) was a German born painter, printmaker, illustrator, and poet. He was the son of artist Georg Sauter and poet and suffragist Lilian Galsworthy, and the nephew and literary executor of John Galsworthy.

== Early life ==
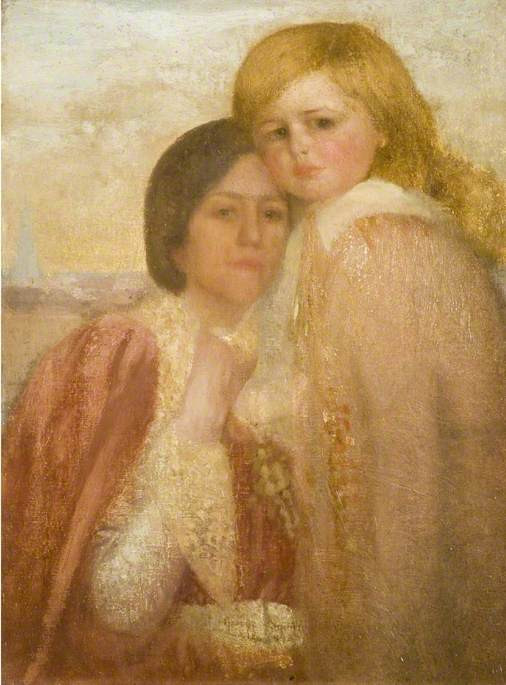
Portrait of Rudolf Sauter as a child with his mother, Lilian, by Georg Sauter (1899)

Rudolf Sauter was born in 1895. He was educated at Harrow School, and later studied art in London and Munich. Sauter exhibited extensively and internationally. This included shows in Paris, New York, and South Africa.

Following the declaration of war with Germany, the British government passed the Aliens Restriction Act. In December 1915, Georg was interned, and ultimately deported to Germany. Rudolf was interned in a converted Alexandra Palace and in Frith Hill Camp, Surrey. Letters written to his wife while interned are held today in the collection of the Imperial War Museum.

Following the war, Sauter became a naturalized British citizen, something he referred to as "purely formal", having lived in England since he was a year old. During World War II acted as an Army Welfare officer, visiting the wives and children of soldiers.

Rudolf Sauter was close to his uncle John Galsworthy, about whom he wrote a memoir: Galsworthy the Man. Following the death of Rudolf's mother, Lilian, Rudolf and his wife Viola Sauter (née Brookman) "lived for a long time with Ada and John Galsworthy... and were treated almost as though they were their children". Sauter was Galsworthy's executor, and bequeathed a number of his papers to the University of Birmingham on his uncle's death.

== Later life and legacy ==
During his later life, Rudolf and Viola lived in Stroud, Gloucestershire. Sauter published three volumes of poetry: Crie du Coeur, A Soothing Wind and A Loving Cup.

Sauter died in Stroud hospital, at the age of 82.

In 2022, a book about Sauter's life and work by Jeffrey S. Reznick was published: War and Peace in the Worlds of Rudolf H. Sauter. This was described as "the first book to examine the creative life and worlds of Rudolf H. Sauter... [revealing] him as a creative figure in his own right who produced an intriguing body of artistic and literary work." The book was reviewed as "a welcome and overdue biography of an artist coping with the vicissitudes of war".
