= Georg Sauter =

German painter

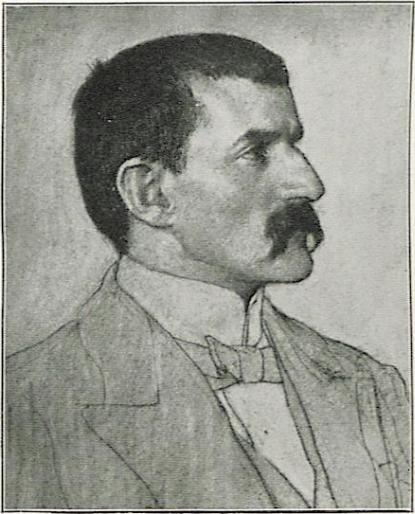
- Georg Sauter by William Strang
- Born: 20 April 1866; Markt Rettenbach (Unterallgäu)
- Died: 20 December 1937 (aged 71); Brannenburg (Bavaria)
- Education: Academy of Fine Arts, Munich
- Known for: portrait, landscapes
- Spouse(s): Lilian Galsworthy; Valda Broad
- Children: Rudolf Helmut Sauter
- Relatives: John Galsworthy (brother-in-law)

Georg Sauter (20 April 1866 – 20 December 1937) was a German-English painter, lithographer and draftsman.

== Life ==
In 1880 Georg Sauter began training as a house painter and then worked in Munich with a painter master. Later he took drawing lessons. He studied painting from October 1884 in the antic class of the Royal Academy of Fine Arts in Munich. There he was a pupil of the landscape painter Ludwig von Löfftz (1845–1910) and received also suggestions by the portrait painter Franz von Lenbach (1836–1904).

Georg Sauter undertook study trips to Holland, Belgium, France and Italy, then lived in London from 1889 as a painter and lithographer, where he married in 1894 Lilian Galsworthy (1864–1924), the sister of the English novelist John Galsworthy. Sauter entered a circle of artists that included the painters Hubert Herkomer, John Lavery and George Frederick Watts, the author Joseph Conrad and the poet John Masefield. He also met the American painters Joseph Pennell and James Abbott McNeill Whistler, both of whom became close friends. His works show the influence of James Whistler. His painting "The Bridal Morning", issued in 1909, won second prize in the Carnegie Art Institute's annual exhibition in Pittsburgh, Pennsylvania, but became the cause of a scandal over its erotic mood.

With the beginning of World War I Sauter was, despite married to an Englishwoman, interned as an enemy alien in 1916 at Alexandra Palace and later expelled. First he went to Jena. Here he had support from the families of glass industrialist Otto Schott and his son-in-law Heinrich Gerland, lawyer and professor at the University of Jena. The friendship with the Gerlands arose in 1906, when Gerland, accompanied by his wife Eva, made a study trip to England and met the artist there. Sauter produced a series of portraits for the Schott family. At the recommendation of Gerland, Sauter created a series of 30 professorial portraits for the University of Jena between 1922 and 1923, which he executed as charcoal drawings. For his work Georg Sauter was appointed honorary citizen of the University of Jena in 1936.

Sauter had his residence in Rome at the beginning of the 1930s. During a stay in Cologne in 1930/31 Sauter portrayed the mayor of Cologne Konrad Adenauer and his second wife Gussi. Adenauer then recommended him to other acquaintances, including the industrialist Carl Duisberg: "He draws heads of men who interest him and combines these drawings into a collection.". Back in Germany, Sauter settled in 1933 in the artists' colony Brannenburg.

In 1898 Sauter was one of the founders and member of council of the International Society of Sculptors, Painters and Gravers. He was also a corresponding member of the Vienna Secession and the Société Royale des Beaux Arts in Brussels and a member of the Deutscher Künstlerbund (Association of German Artists).

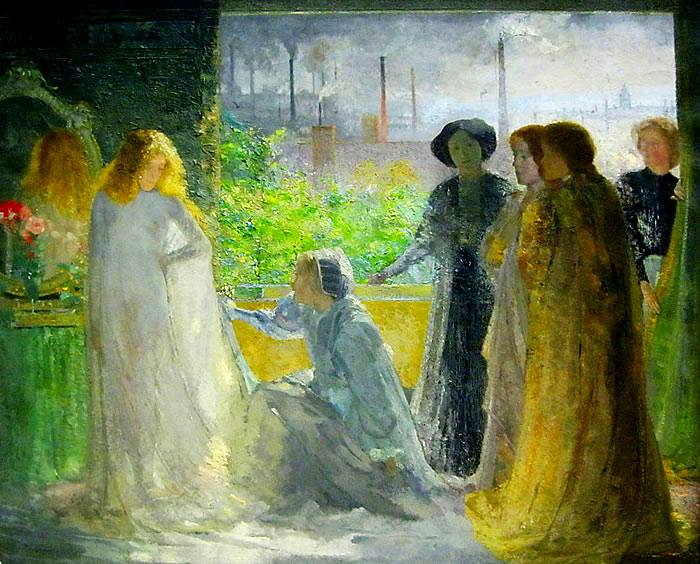
The Leeds Picture, 1908

Georg Sauter was secondly married to Valda Broad (died Dec. 1937) since 1926. The son Rudolf Sauter (1895–1971) was also a portrait painter, draftsman and graphic artist. Among other things, he illustrated the works of his uncle John Galsworthy.

Industry, too, has inspired George Sauter to one of his finest works "The Leeds Picture", which forms part of the Wilson collection. This canvas, very different in subject from those he is best known by, symbolises the homage of Labour to Beauty, to whom the products of local industry are offered by attendant females, and is certainly one of the most harmonious and complete pictures that the artist has produced.

— Abel Torcy, "Modern Art in Leeds: The Collection of Mr. Sam Wilson", The Studio: international art. 69.1916.

== Honors ==
- Commander of the Order of Francis Joseph, Austria
- Knight of the Order of St Michael, 4th Class, Bavaria
- Knight of the Order of the Zähringer Lion, Baden
- Honorary citizen of the Friedrich Schiller University, Jena
- Holder of various gold medals from international exhibitions
- Royal Bavarian professor, 1902
- Silver Medal and Thousand Dollar Prize of the Carnegie Museums of Pittsburgh, 1908

== Gallery ==
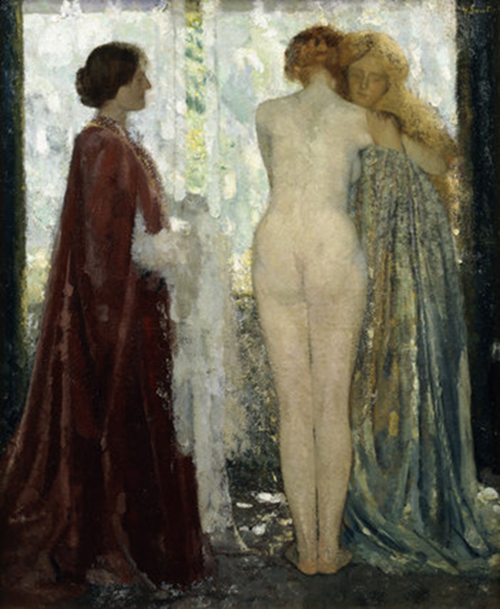
The Bridal Morning, 1902

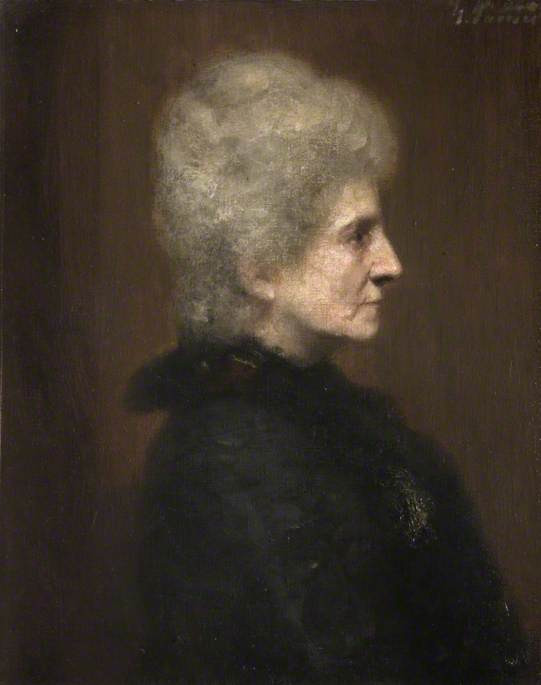
Blanche Bailey Galsworthy

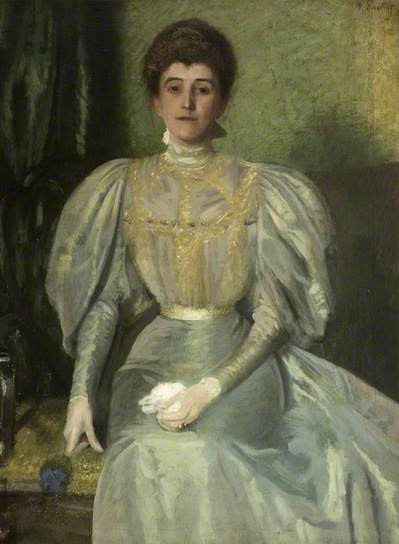
Ada Galsworthy

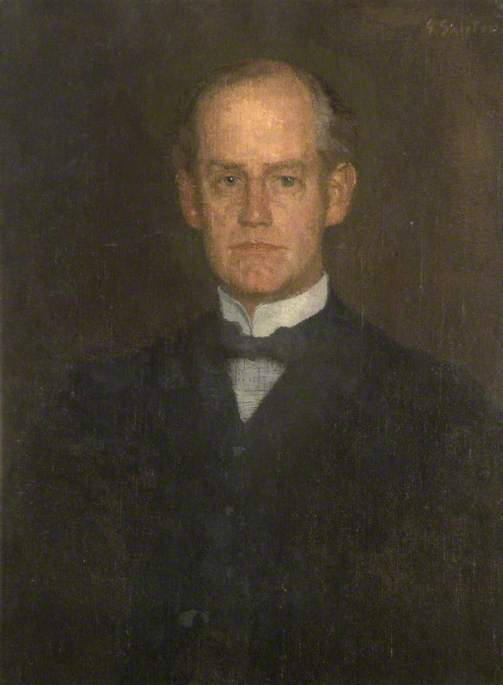
John Galsworthy

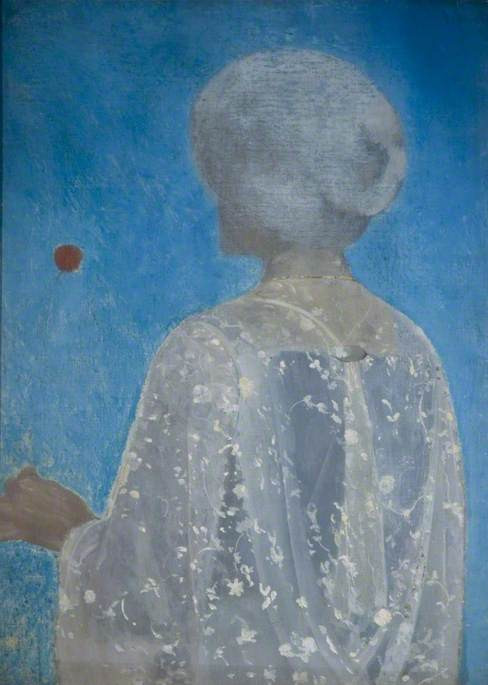
Lilian Sauter

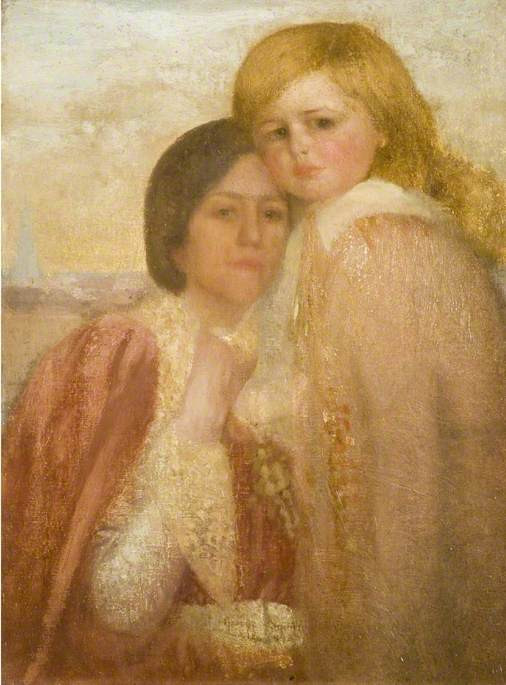
Maternity, 1899
