= Adrian Hayes =

English footballer

Personal information
- Date of birth: 22 May 1978
- Place of birth: Norwich, Norfolk, England
- Date of death: 18 August 2014 (aged 36)
- Height: 6 ft 1 in (1.85 m)
- Position: Midfielder

Youth career
- 1994–1996: Cambridge United

Senior career*
Years	Team	Apps	(Gls)
1996–1998	Cambridge United	31	(0)
1998–1999	Kettering Town		
1999–2000	Diss Town		
2000	Boston United		
2000	Tamworth		
2000–2002	King's Lynn		
2002–2003	Cambridge City	35	(3)
2003–2004	Farnborough Town	33	(2)
2004–2006	A.F.C. Sudbury	56	(7)
2006–2007	Mildenhall Town		
2007–	Dereham Town		
- * Club domestic league appearances and goals

Adrian Hayes (22 May 1978 – 18 August 2014) was an English professional footballer who played in The Football League for Cambridge United as a midfielder, and later played for a number of non-league clubs, mostly in East Anglia and the South East.

He died in August 2014, aged 36, from a brain tumour.
