= Keiron Pim =

British journalist and author (born 1978)

Keiron Pim (born 1978) is a British journalist and author. He is best known for his biographies Jumpin' Jack Flash: David Litvinoff and the Rock’n’Roll Underworld and Endless Flight: The Life of Joseph Roth.

== Career ==
Pim began his career as a journalist, working for the Eastern Daily Press, and as a freelance writing for the Guardian, the Daily Telegraph, and the Spectator.

In 2007, he was named the national Feature Writer of the Year at the Press Gazette Regional Press Awards.

He now teaches a course in Creative Non-Fiction, part of the National Centre for Writing and the University of East Anglia's Creative Writing Online programme.
