= David Eyre Percival =

British architect and town planner

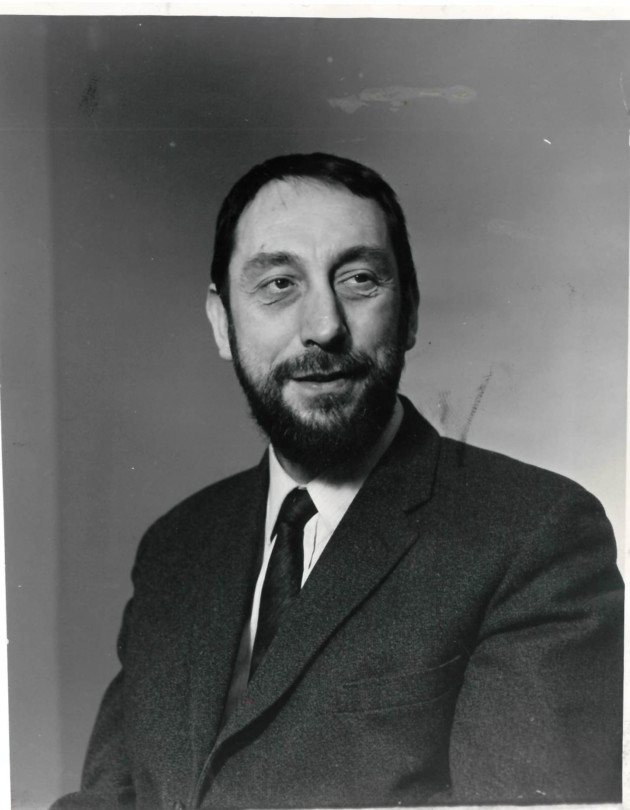
David Eyre Percival

David Eyre Percival (June 1, 1914 – April 20, 1995) was a British architect and town planner, known for his work as the City Architect of Norwich, where he pioneered what has been called a Vernacular Revival Style. His work can be seen across the city of Norwich and several of his developments were awarded.

== Career ==
David Percival first worked with Kent County Council Architects Department in 1944. He then joined Newport Borough Council Architects Department in 1947, and later the Ministry of Town and Country Planning in 1948 as Assistant Planning Officer for Wales. He was involved in the early studies for Cwmbran.

Later as Assistant Chief Architect in East Kilbride (Scotland) he was in charge of planning and contributed to substantial modification of the town master plan.

He then became Deputy City Architect under Donald Gibson in Coventry.

In 1955 Percival was appointed City Architect of Norwich, when the City completed its general needs housing programme. During more than 20 years, he developed a representative range of local authority housing from cottage suburbs to mixed developments to deck-access and high-rise. By the 1970s, Norwich had the highest proportion of council housing of any city in the country.

He also served on the committees of the Royal Institute of British Architects and as President of the City and Borough Architects Society. Fluent in French, he was active in the Franco Britannique Association of Architects.

He resigned in 1973 under the impact of local reorganisation when the City was due to lose its centuries old independence.

He then became in 1974 a partner of Edward Skipper, son of George Skipper of Norwich whose practice was founded in 1882, and was able to continue in private practice.

== Selected buildings and developments ==
- Heartsease Junior (1956)
- Hewett School (1958)
- Alderson Place (1958), a typically Picturesque integration of human-scale housing and historic context
- Infants School (1960)
- Norwich Livestock Market (1960)
- New Housing Group in Rosary Road (1960)
- St Augustine's St Swimming pool (1961), later demolished and replaced by a row of shops
- Norwich Central Library (1962), for which he also designed all the furniture, destroyed by fire in 1994
- The Compass Tower (1964), the city's first experiment with eleven-storey tower blocks
- The Ashbourne and Burleigh Towers (1964)
- Winchester Tower (1965)
- Pope's Buildings (1972)
- Hopper's Yard (1973)
- Langham Place (1979)

== Honours ==
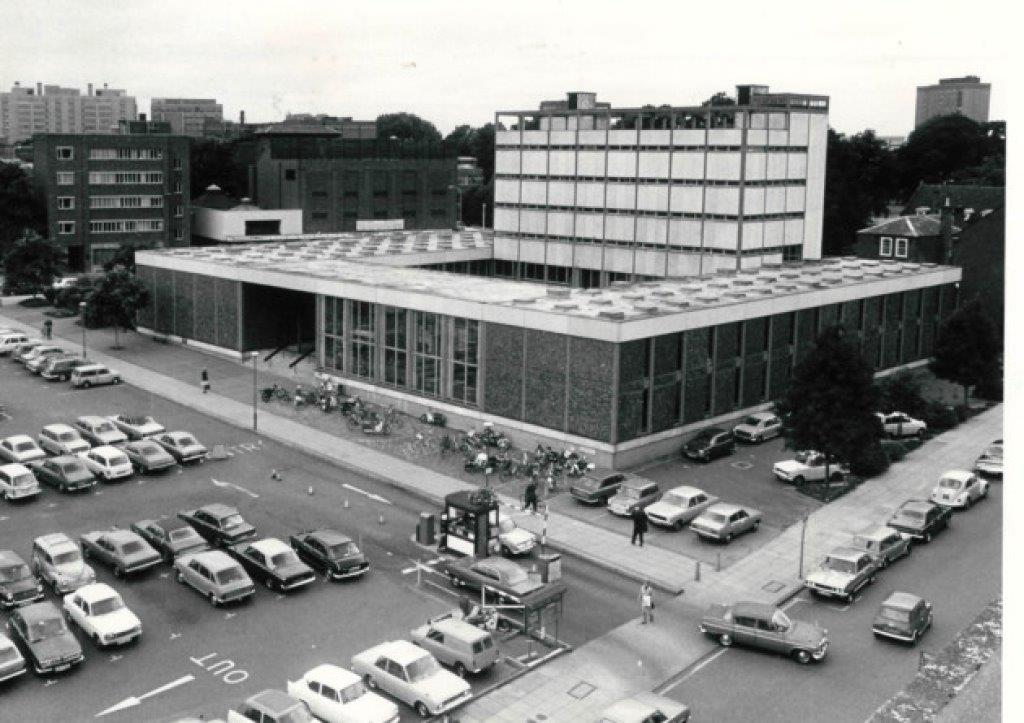
Norwich Central Library (1962)

Good Design in Housing award from the Ministry of Housing and Local Government for his development at Alderson Place in Norwich (1959).

Civic Trust Award for 131-133 Rosary Road in Norwich (1960).

RIBA medal and Civic Trust Award for Norwich Central Library (1963). When the Norwich Central Library was opened by Queen Elizabeth the Queen Mother in 1963, she said “It is always a very real pleasure to me to visit Norwich, and I am particularly glad that my visit today sees the completion of your Central Library, the fulfilment of many years of careful thought and planning.”

OBE of the Order of the British Empire in 1973 for services to architecture .

== Personal life ==
David Eyre Percival was born in 1914 in Marylebone (Westminster) in a British family of artists. His father, Frank Percival Driver, was a musician, singer and music teacher. His mother Olive Mary Parkin was an actress.

He was christened David Eyre Percival Driver, but in 1935 at the age of 21 he changed his name by deed poll to David Eyre Percival, as his brother changed his to Michael Percival at the same time.

David attended the Bartlett School of Architecture in London, and qualified as ARIBA in 1938.

In 1944 he married Kathleen Margaret Jenkins in Hendon, Barnet. She was the widow of Alan Fay Birley, a pilot officer/observer RAF killed in action in 1942, with whom she’d had a child, Michael. They had 5 sons : Richard, Roger, Andrew, Jonathan and Edward. After his wife died in 1987, he married Mauny Wood. David died 20 April 1995 in Norwich.
