= Ralph Hale Mottram =

English novelist and war poet

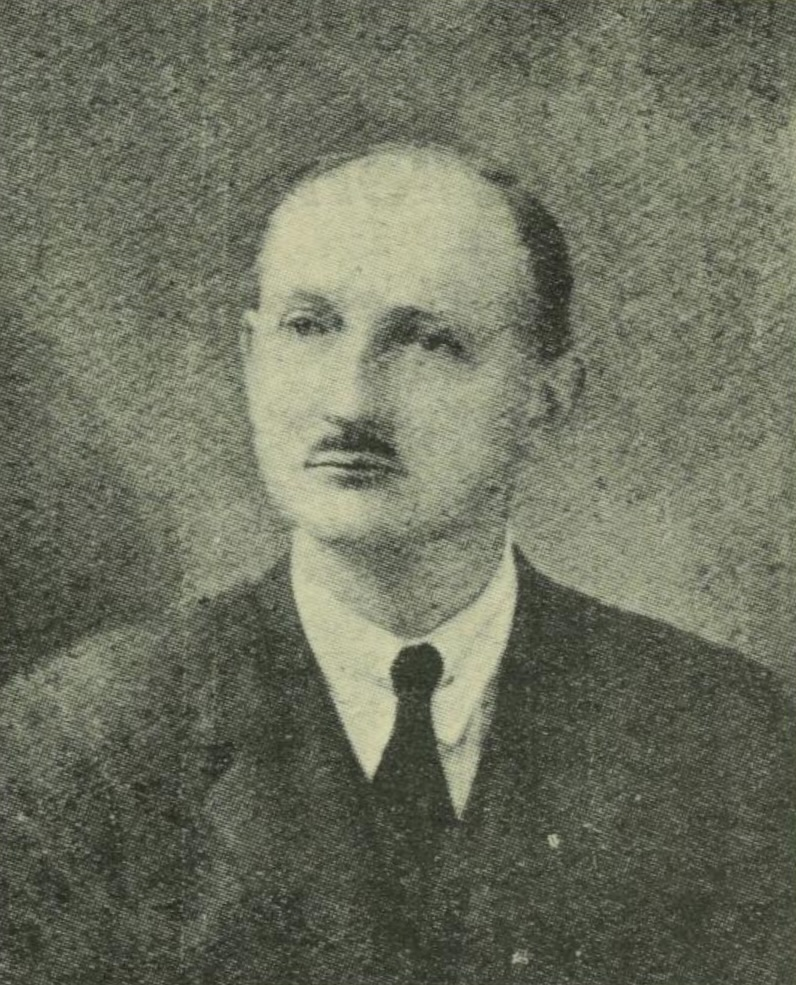
Ralph Hale Mottram in 1925

Ralph Hale Mottram FRSL (30 October 1883 – 16 April 1971) was an English writer. A lifelong resident of Norfolk, he was well known as a novelist, in particular for his "Spanish Farm trilogy", and as a poet of World War I.

== Early life ==
Mottram was born in Norwich, Norfolk, the oldest son of James Mottram and his second wife, Fanny Ann (nee Hale). The Mottrams were non-conformist and worshipped at the Octagon Chapel in Colegate. He grew up in Bank House, a George II mansion on Bank Plain, the headquarters of Gurney's Bank, later merged into Barclays Bank. He was educated at the City of Norwich School. Mottram's father James was the chief clerk of Gurney's Bank, and was trustee of the marriage settlement of Ada Galsworthy, wife of novelist John Galsworthy. Ada encouraged the young Ralph Mottram to begin writing, and he published two slim volumes of poetry which appeared in 1907 and 1909 under the pseudonym of "J. Marjoram". He remained close friends of the Galsworthys and would later write personal portraits of them.

== First World War ==
Mottram was posted to the Western Front with the 9th battalion of the Norfolk Regiment, in the 6th Division of the British Expeditionary Force (BEF) in October 1915, where he took part in defence of the Ypres Salient. After intermittent periods of hospitalisation, his proficiency in the French language earned him a position as a Divisional Claims Officer. Eventually he was assigned to the Claims Commission's HQ at Boulogne and was promoted to lieutenant. In 1918 he married Margaret (Madge) Allan. They had two sons and a daughter and were married for over fifty years.

== Career ==
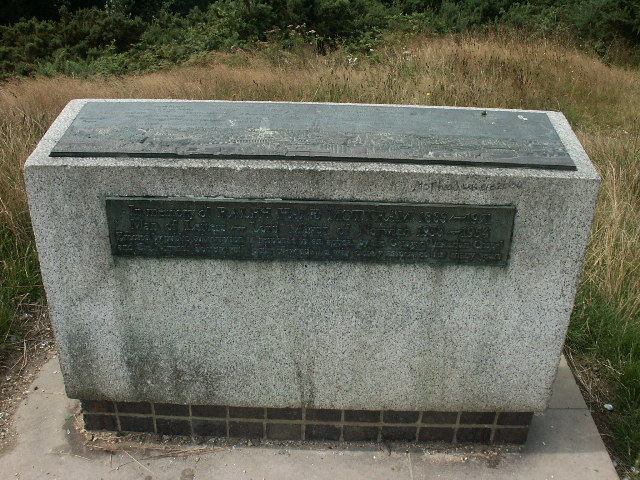
Viewpoint marker/guide, St James Hill, Norwich

He had begun working at Gurney's Bank in December 1899, and after the war continued to work for them whilst writing in his spare time. The Spanish Farm, for which John Galsworthy had provided a preface, won the 1924 Hawthornden Prize. In 1927 it was made into a silent film entitled Roses of Picardy. The American author William Faulkner greatly admired The Spanish Farm trilogy, comparing it with Stephen Crane's The Red Badge of Courage for its insights into the reality of war. The scholar Max Putzel summarised this by stating: "Mottram had given Faulkner an example for dealing with war by indirection, understating or disguising the powerful emotions Crane had boldly undertaken to summon up". Mottram wrote the Galsworthy number for the National Book League's "Writers and their Work" series, and penned numerous books on the subjects of his home city, county and the wider region of East Anglia. During World War II he was a British Council representative to the United States Army Air Force division based in Norfolk.

Mottram became Lord Mayor of the city in 1953, the year of the Queen's coronation.

He worked with others towards the foundation of the University of East Anglia which opened in 1963, and which made him an honorary Doctor of Letters in 1966. As a conservationist, he was a defender of Mousehold Heath, a large open space in the heart of Norwich, and was a chairman of the Norwich Society. On St James' Hill overlooking the city, there is a memorial plinth dedicated to him, which depicts the skyline of Norwich.

== Death ==
After his wife's death in 1970, Mottram moved to King's Lynn to live with his daughter and died the following year. He is buried in the non-denominational Rosary Cemetery, Norwich, where a headstone stands in memory of the couple and their three children. Being a non-member of the established Church of England, Mottram once said: "I knew, when I was four years old, exactly where I could be buried."

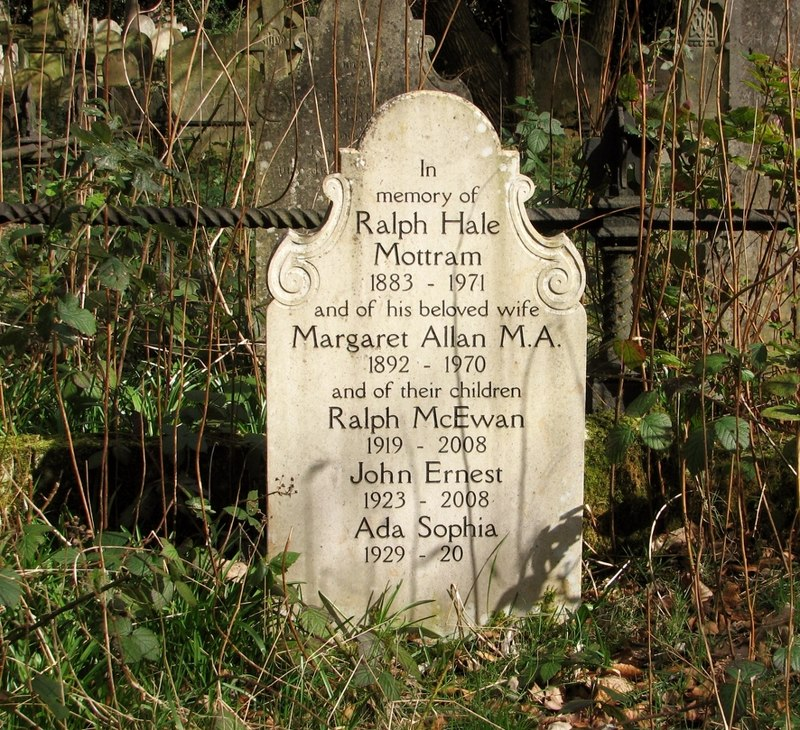
The grave of Ralph Hale Mottram

== Works ==
- Repose and other verses (1907), as "J. Marjoram"
- New Poems (1909), as "J. Marjoram"
- The Spanish Farm (1924), a trilogy with Sixty-Four, Ninety-Four and The Crime at Vanderlynden's
- Sixty-Four, Ninety-Four! (1925)
- The Crime at Vanderlynden's (1926)
- Our Mr. Dormer (1927), a trilogy with The Boroughmonger and Castle Island
- The Apple Disdained (1928)
- Ten Years Ago. Armistice and other Memories (1928)
- The English Miss (1928)
- "Six Walks in Norwich", chapter in Official Guide to the City of Norwich (England) (1929), reprinted many times
- A History of Financial Speculation (1929)
- The Boroughmonger (1929)
- Three Personal Records of the War (1929), with John Easton and Eric Partridge; republished as Three Men's War: The Personal Records of Active Service (1930)
- A Rich Man's Daughter (1930)
- Miniature Banking Histories (1930)
- Europa's Beast (1930)
- The Old Man of the Stones: A Christmas Allegory (1930)
- The New Providence (1930)
- Poems New and Old (1930)
- The Lost Christmas Presents (1931)
- Castle Island (1931)
- John Crome of Norwich (1931)
- The Headless Hound and other stories (1931)
- Through the Menin Gate (1932)
- Home for the Holidays (1932)
- Dazzle (1932)
- The Lame Dog (1933), US edition: At the Sign of the Lame Dog (1933)
- East Anglia: England's Eastern Province (1933)
- "The Contribution of a Provincial Centre (Norwich) to English Letters", chapter 3 in Essays by Divers Hands, Vol. XIII (1934)
- The Banquet (1934)
- Bumphrey's (1934)
- Strawberry Time (1934), from the Golden Cockerel Press, engravings by Gertrude Hermes
- "Town Life and London", chapter in Early Victorian England, 1830-1865 (1934), edited by G. M. Young
- Flower Pot End (1935)
- Early Morning (1935)
- Journey to the Western Front Twenty Years After (1936)
- The Westminster Bank 1836–1936 (1936)
- Portrait of an Unknown Victorian (1936)
- The Norwich Players (1936), Maddermarket Theatre etc., preface by Nugent Monck
- Old England. Illustrated by English Paintings of the 18th and early 19th centuries (1937)
- Time to Be Going (1937)
- Noah (1937), no. 9 of Rich & Cowan's 'Biblical Biographies' series
- Success to the Mayor: A Narrative of the Development of Local Self-Government in a Provincial Centre (Norwich) during Eight Centuries (1937)
- There was a Jolly Miller (1938)
- Autobiography with a Difference (1938), with 16 collotype illustrations by A. H. Mottram - Alfred Hugh Mottram (1886–1953) was an architect and the younger brother of R. H. Mottram
- Miss Lavington (1939)
- You Can't Have It Back! (1939)
- Trader's Dream. The Romance of the [British] East India Company (1939)
- Bowler Hat: A Last Glance at the Old Country Banking (1940)
- The Ghost and the Maiden (1940)
- The World Turns Slowly Round (1942)
- The Corbells At War (1943)
- Assault upon Norwich (1943), reporting on air raids
- Visit of the Princess – a Romance of the 1960s (1946)
- Buxton the Liberator (1946)
- Hibbert Houses. A Record (1947)
- The English Counties Illustrated (1948), chapters on Norfolk, Suffolk and Cambridgeshire, edited by C. E. M. Joad
- Norfolk (1948), from the Paul Elek 'Vision of England' series
- The Glories of Norwich Cathedral (1948)
- The Gentleman of Leisure. A Romance (1948)
- Come to the Bower (1949)
- East Anglia (1951), no. 4 in the About Britain series
- One Hundred and Twenty-Eight Witnesses (1951)
- The Broads (1952), the Norfolk Broads, from the 'Regional Books' series
- The Part That Is Missing (1952)
- If Stones Could Speak. An Introduction to an Almost Human Family (1953), a social history of Norwich
- John Galsworthy (1953), no. 38 of the 'Writers and their Work' series
- The City of Norwich Museums 1894–1954. A Diamond Jubilee Record (1954)
- The Window Seat or Life Observed, 1883–1918 (1954), autobiography
- Over the Wall (1955)
- For Some We Loved: an Intimate Portrait of Ada and John Galsworthy (1956)
- Scenes that are Brightest (1956)
- Another Window Seat or Life Observed, 1919–1953 (1957), autobiography
- Vanities and Verities (1958), more autobiography
- No One Will Ever Know; or The Hidden Life of Gregory Wantage (1958)
- Young Man's Fancies (1959)
- Musetta (1960)
- Time's Increase (1961)
- To Hell with Crabb Robinson (1962)
- Happy Birds (1964)
- Maggie Mackenzie (1965)
- The Speaking Likeness (1967)
- Behind the Shutters (1968)
- Twelve Poems (1968), with a dedicatory poem by Edmund Blunden and illustrations by Rigby Graham
- The Twentieth Century. A Personal Record (1969), memoir
