= Endless Flight: The Life of Joseph Roth =

2022 book by Keiron Pim

- Author: Keiron Pim
- Language: English
- Subject: Joseph Roth
- Publisher: Granta Books
- Publication date: October 6, 2022 (UK); December 6, 2022 (US)
- Pages: 544
- ISBN: 978-1-78378-509-4

Endless Flight: The Life of Joseph Roth is a 2022 book by Keiron Pim that examines the life of Joseph Roth.
