= List of museums in Norfolk =

This list of museums in Norfolk, England contains museums which are defined for this context as institutions (including nonprofit organizations, government entities, and private businesses) that collect and care for objects of cultural, artistic, scientific, or historical interest and make their collections or related exhibits available for public viewing. Also included are non-profit art galleries and university art galleries. Museums that exist only in cyberspace (i.e., virtual museums) are not included.

Many of these museums are members of Museums Norfolk (formerly the Museums in Norfolk Group). Museums Norfolk is the representative organisation for museums in the county, and its membership includes museums from both Norfolk Museums Service (NMS) and independent museums. Details of each member museum, opening times and events are given on its website www.museumsnorfolk.org.uk.

Name	Image	Town/City	Region	Type	Summary
100th Bomb Group Memorial Museum		Thorpe Abbotts	South Norfolk	Military	History of the 100th Bomb Group at RAF Thorpe Abbotts in World War II
389th Memorial Exhibition Museum		Hethel	South Norfolk	Military	history of RAF Hethel and the 389th Bombardment Group, open on specific days
Ancient House, Thetford		Thetford	Breckland	Local	Tudor merchant's house with local history and period rooms displays
Barton House Railway		Wroxham	Broadland	Railway	Heritage miniature railway and museum with Midland & Great Northern Joint Railway memorabilia and artefacts
Bishop Bonner's Cottage Museum		East Dereham	Breckland	Local	local history, archaeology, operated by the Dereham Antiquarian Society
Blickling Hall, Gardens and Park		Blickling	Broadland	Historic house	Operated by the National Trust, Jacobean stately home with reflecting four centuries of use, museum about use by RAF Oulton in World War II
Blitz and Pieces		Scratby	Great Yarmouth	Military	Life in England (the Home Front) during World War II and Dad's Army
Bressingham Steam & Gardens		Bressingham	South Norfolk	Technology	Steam railway engines, tractors and other vehicles
Burston Strike School		Burston	South Norfolk	Education	Centre of the longest running strike in British history, between 1914 and 1939
Caister Castle Motor Museum		Caister-on-Sea	Great Yarmouth	Transportation	Fine and rare veteran, vintage, classic, sports and touring automobiles and motorcycles, bicycles, horse-drawn vehicles, pedal cars and other related items
Castle Acre Priory		Castle Acre	King's Lynn and West Norfolk	Religious	Operated by English Heritage, history and remains of the medieval priory
Charles Burrell Museum		Thetford	Breckland	Industry	Exhibits about Charles Burrell & Sons manufacturers of traction engines, agricultural machinery, steam trucks wagons and tram engines
City of Norwich Aviation Museum		Horsham St Faith	Norwich	Aviation	Military and civilian aircraft, history of aviation in Norfolk
Clifton House, King's Lynn		King's Lynn	King's Lynn and West Norfolk	Historic house	merchant's house with historic interiors dating from the 13th to the 18th centuries, and five-storey Elizabethan tower
Collectors World		Downham Market	King's Lynn and West Norfolk	Multiple	Currently closed, includes Magical Dickens Experience with Victorian period street tableaux, photos and equipment of James Lafayette, Aero Museum with aero engines from Rolls-Royce and Armstrong Siddeley, rooms about author Barbara Cartland, Admiral Horatio Nelson, actress Liza Goddard, the 1960s, telephones, horse-drawn carts and carriages, farming and household memorabilia, an old cobblers shop, and antique and unusual dolls
Colman's Mustard Shop and Museum		Norwich	Norwich	Food	store and museum of Colman's mustard memorabilia
County School Station		North Elmham	Breckland	Railway	World War II period station and museum for the Mid-Norfolk Railway
Cromer Museum		Cromer	North Norfolk	Local	local history, culture, geology, Victorian fisherman's cottage display
Custom House, King's Lynn		King's Lynn	King's Lynn and West Norfolk	Maritime	Exhibits about the merchants, customs men and smugglers of Lynn, Horatio Nelson and George Vancouver
Dad's Army Museum		Thetford	Breckland	Media/Local	exhibits about Dad's Army and its links with Thetford
Denver Windmill		Denver	King's Lynn and West Norfolk	Mill	Early 19th-century restored windmill, currently closed
Diss Museum		Diss	South Norfolk	Local	local history
Elizabethan House Museum		Great Yarmouth	Great Yarmouth	Historic house	reflects different periods from the Elizabethan to the Victorian eras
Fakenham Museum of Gas and Local History		Fakenham	North Norfolk	Industry	information, former gasworks used in the manufacture of gas from coal, displays of gas-powered lighting, heating, cooking and domestic equipment
Felbrigg Hall		Felbrigg	North Norfolk	Historic house	Operated by the National Trust, 17th-century country house with Jacobean exterior and sumptuous Georgian interior
Fishermen's Heritage Centre		Sheringham	North Norfolk	Maritime	information, Sheringham's private lifeboats, including the Henry Ramey Upcher, the fishermen who crewed them and the lives they led, Peter Coke Shell Gallery
Forncett Industrial Steam Museum		Forncett	South Norfolk	Technology	Collection of large stationary steam engines
The Forum		Norwich	Norwich	Art	Includes Fusion, a digital screen gallery for art
Great Bircham Windmill		Great Bircham	King's Lynn and West Norfolk	Mill	Mid 19th-century windmill
Great Yarmouth Row Houses		Great Yarmouth	Great Yarmouth	Historic house	Operated by English Heritage, early 17th-century merchants' houses later sub-divided into tenements
Green Britain Centre		Swaffham	Breckland	Ecology	Green energy (including solar and wind power), transportation options without oil, and organic gardening
Green Quay		King's Lynn	King's Lynn and West Norfolk	Multiple	, environment and natural history of the Ouse Wash, history of shipping and trading
Gressenhall Farm and Workhouse		Gressenhall	Breckland	Multiple	historic workhouse, heritage farm, agriculture and rural life displays, costumes, steam engines, historic farm machinery and farming implements
Gunton Sawmill		Erpingham	North Norfolk	Industrial	preserved saw mill in working order owned by the Norfolk Windmills Trust, run by the Norfolk Industrial Archeology society
Harleston Museum		Harleston	South Norfolk	Local	https://web.archive.org/web/20150402165423/http://www.visiteastofengland.com/Harleston-Harleston-Museum/details/?dms=3&venue=0227282 information], local history
Holkham Hall		Holkham	North Norfolk	Multiple	18th-century Palladian style country house with opulent interiors, walled gardens, Bygones Museum with toys, household implements, agricultural tools, vintage cars and steam engines, and an exhibition on the history of farming
Horsey Windpump		Horsey	North Norfolk	Mill	Operated by the National Trust, drainage windmill pump
Houghton Hall		Harpley	King's Lynn and West Norfolk	Historic house	18th-century Palladian-style country house built for Britain's first Prime Minister, Sir Robert Walpole
King's Lynn Arts Centre		King's Lynn	King's Lynn and West Norfolk	Art	performing and visual arts centre with galleries
Letheringsett Watermill		Letheringsett with Glandford	North Norfolk	Mill	Working early 19th-century watermill
Lydia Eva		Great Yarmouth	Great Yarmouth	Maritime	Last surviving steam-powered herring drifter museum ship
Lynn Museum		King's Lynn	King's Lynn and West Norfolk	Local	local history, archaeology, social history
Marshland Maritime Museum		Clenchwarton	King's Lynn and West Norfolk	Military	open by appointment only, naval memorabilia
Mid-Norfolk Railway		Dereham	Breckland	Railway	Headquarters and museum for the heritage railway
Mo Sheringham Museum		Sheringham	North Norfolk	Local	Local history, lifeboats, fishing industry
Muckleburgh Collection		Weybourne	North Norfolk	Military	History and memorabilia of RAF Weybourne, Suffolk and Norfolk Yeomanry, naval and civilian ship models, weapons, missiles, tanks, aircraft and other military vehicles
Mundesley Maritime Museum		Mundesley	Norwich	Local	local maritime heritage and social history
Museum of Norwich at the Bridewell		Norwich	Norwich	Local	local industries, culture, people's daily lives
Museum of Straw Work and Crafts		Colby	North Norfolk	Art	information, items crafted from straw including corn dollies, marquetry, Swiss straw lace, plaits, embroidery, jewellery
Museum of the Broads		Stalham	North Norfolk	Local	boats, heritage of the Broadland waterways
Nelson Museum		Great Yarmouth	Great Yarmouth	Military	Life and naval history of Admiral Horatio Nelson
Norfolk Motorcycle Museum		North Walsham	North Norfolk	Transportation	motorcycles from the 1920s to the 1960s
Norfolk Tank Museum		Forncett	South Norfolk	Military	Cold War militaria including Main Battle Tanks, armoured personnel carriers, small arms, military memorabilia and uniforms
Norwich Arts Centre		Norwich	Norwich	Art	Performing arts centre with exhibit galleries
Norwich Castle		Norwich	Norwich	Multiple	Tours of the castle, dungeon and battlements, exhibits of fine and decorative arts including costume, textiles, jewelry, glass, ceramics and silverware, exhibits of archaeology, Ancient Egypt, natural history, Anglo Saxon and Viking artifacts
Norwich Cathedral		Norwich	Norwich	Religious	Visitor centre with exhibits about the cathedral and art exhibits
Norwich Printing Museum		Blickling	Broadland	History	Historic printing equipment. Temporarily located at Blickling Hall
Old Gaol House & Regalia Rooms		Kings lynni	King's Lynn and West Norfolk	Multiple	1930s police station, old jail cells, city treasures and regalia
Oxburgh Hall		Oxborough	Breckland	Historic house	Operated by the National Trust, 15th-century moated country house
Peter Coke Shell Gallery		Sheringham	North Norfolk	Art	sculptures and arrangements formed from seashells from around the world, adjacent to Fishermen's Heritage Centre
RAF Air Defence Radar Museum		Horning	North Norfolk	Military	located at RAF Neatishead, history of the military radar station in World War II and the Cold War
RAF Sculthorpe Heritage Centre		Fakenham	North Norfolk	Military	website, Learn about the stories of East Anglias only USAF Atomic Drop bomb base.
RNLI Henry Blogg Museum		Cromer	North Norfolk	Maritime	Cromer lifeboat crews and their most famous coxswain Henry Blogg
Royal Norfolk Regimental Museum		Norwich	Norwich	Military	Regimental artefacts and memorabilia
Sainsbury Centre for Visual Arts		Norwich	Norwich	Art	Part of the University of East Anglia, collections include modern art, art from Africa, the Pacific, the Americas, Asia, Egypt, medieval Europe and the ancient Mediterranean, Art Nouveau decorative art, abstract and constructivist art, architecture and design
Sandringham Estate		Sandringham	King's Lynn and West Norfolk	Historic house	Private home of the British royal family, includes late 19th-century house with furnishings, Sandringham Museum with royal collection of gifts, vehicles, ceramics, photographs and memorabilia
Seething Control Tower Museum		Seething	South Norfolk	Military	located at Seething Airfield, history of the 448th Fighter-Bomber Group at RAF Seething in World War II
Shell Museum		Glandford	North Norfolk	Natural history	seashells, fossils, birds' eggs, agate ware, local archaeological finds
Stow Mill		Paston	North Norfolk	Mill	early 19th-century windmill
Stalham Firehouse Museum		Stalham	Norwich	Firefighting	
Strangers' Hall		Norwich	Norwich	Historic house	Tudor and Stuart period rooms
Strumpshaw Hall Steam Museum		Strumpshaw	Broadland	Technology	Steam traction engines, rollers, a wagon and a showman's engine
Swaffham Museum		Swaffham	Breckland	Local	local history and culture
Thursford Collection		Thursford	North Norfolk	Technology	Steam engines, organs and fairground attractions
Time and Tide: The Museum of Great Yarmouth Life		Great Yarmouth	Great Yarmouth	Maritime	Area fishing, shipbuilding and other maritime trades, merchant trade and lifesaving, herring fishing and curing
Toad Hole Cottage		How Hill	North Norfolk	Local	information, home and working life on the marshes of The Broads in the early 20th century
The Tolhouse		Great Yarmouth	Great Yarmouth	Prison	12th-century medieval former merchant's house turned into a prison
True's Yard Fisherfolk Museum		King's Lynn	King's Lynn and West Norfolk	Maritime	exhibits about the historic fishing community
Walsingham Abbey Grounds and Shirehall Museum		Walsingham	North Norfolk	Religious	ruins of the medieval abbey, museum with exhibits on the abbey and local history
Whitwell & Reepham Railway Station		Reepham	Broadland	Railway	Historic railway station under restoration
William Marriott Museum		Holt	North Norfolk	Railway	Railway artefacts of the North Norfolk Railway
Wind Energy Museum		Repps with Bastwick	Great Yarmouth	Technology	Windmills
Wolterton Hall		Erpingham	North Norfolk	Historic house	Restored Georgian country house and park
Wymondham Heritage Museum		Wymondham	South Norfolk	Local	Local history, culture, former prison, police station and courthouse
Wymondham Station		Wymondham	South Norfolk	Railway	Features collection of railway memorabilia

== Defunct museums ==
- Dragon Hall, Norwich, closed to visitors in 2015
- Fenland Aviation and West Norfolk Museum, near Walsoken, closed to visitors in October 2022.
- Iceni Village & Museums, Cockley Cley, reconstruction of the type of village occupied by a British tribe, the Iceni, closed in 2014
- Inspire Discovery Centre, Norwich, closed in 2011
- Litcham Village Museum, Litcham
- Norfolk's Golden Fleece Heritage Museum, Worstead
- Town House Museum, King's Lynn, closed in 2011
- Yesterday's World, Great Yarmouth, closed in 2014

== See also ==
- Category:Tourist attractions in Norfolk
