= Norfolk Museums Service =

Council museums authority in Norfolk, UK

- Formation: 1974; 51 years ago
- Purpose: Heritage and conservation
- Headquarters: Shirehall, Norwich
- Head of service: Steve Miller
- Website: www.museums.norfolk.gov.uk

Norfolk Museums Service (NMS), formerly Norfolk Museums and Archaeology Service (NMAS), is a county-wide museums service that presides over ten museums in Norfolk, operated by Norfolk County Council and headed by the council's Director of Culture and Heritage, Steve Miller. It notably runs Norwich Castle Museum, Strangers' Hall, and the Time and Tide Museum, and also operates a study centre at Shirehall.

== History ==
Norfolk Museums Service came into existence in 1974. Norfolk's County Council and its district councils agreed to delegate their authority for museums to a Joint Museums Committee and to establish a county-wide museums service.

In 2011, it was proposed by Conservatives in the County Council that the service should be given to a charitable trust in order to save £160,000 from the council's budget, as the organisation was under pressure to save £650,000 in four years. Councillors voted not to go ahead with the plan in January 2012, with leader of the Labour group George Nobbs particularly opposing the measure.

In June 2013, Steve Miller, chief executive of the Ironbridge Gorge Museum Trust and member of the European Cultural Parliament, became the new head of the NMS, after Vanessa Trevelyan retired from the position in March. Robin Hanley controlled the service in the interim.

Following the attempted theft of a rhino horn from Norwich Castle in 2012 and a successful theft of items associated with Admiral Lord Nelson valued at £36,800 five days later, as well as six more items stolen between March 2012 and December 2013, councillors criticised the NMS for a lack of security. A security review was held at the service's ten museums, leading to an extension of CCTV coverage and alarm systems in some of the museums.

The years of 2017-18 brought record visitor numbers for the service, with 426,110 people visiting NMS museums between April 2017 and March 2018, accounting for a 9% rise. Norwich Castle accounted for half of these visitors, and Time and Tide Museum's visitors increased by 22%.

In 2022, the decreased budget available to the NMS, which was cited to be a result of the impact of the COVID-19 pandemic, reduced public funding and the prospect of an Arts Council grant cut, led to expectations that the service would overspend by £850,000, 40% of its approved budget, that year, and that it would also reduce its opening hours. Two days later, the NMS was awarded £4.1 million from the Arts Council.

== Museums ==
The NMS operates 10 different museums around Norfolk, three of which are in Norwich and three in Great Yarmouth:

- Cromer Museum, Cromer
- The Elizabethan House, Great Yarmouth
- Time and Tide Museum of Great Yarmouth Life, Great Yarmouth
- The Tolhouse, Great Yarmouth
- Gressenhall Farm and Workhouse, Gressenhall (including a collections centre)
- Lynn Museum, King's Lynn
- The Museum of Norwich at the Bridewell, Norwich
- Norwich Castle Museum and Art Gallery, Norwich (including the Royal Norfolk Regimental Museum and Shirehall study centre)
- Strangers' Hall, Norwich
- Ancient House Museum of Thetford Life, Thetford

== See also ==
- List of museums in Norfolk
