= Time Museum =

Time Museum, or similar terms, may refer to:

- Time Museum, Tehran, Iran, exhibiting clocks etc.
- Time and Tide Museum, Great Yarmouth, England, a maritime and fishing museum
- Irish Museum of Time, Waterford, Ireland, exhibiting clocks etc.
- Museum of Timekeeping and Mechanical Musical Instruments, by Lake Thun, Switzerland
