= Seahenge =

Bronze Age monuments in Norfolk, England

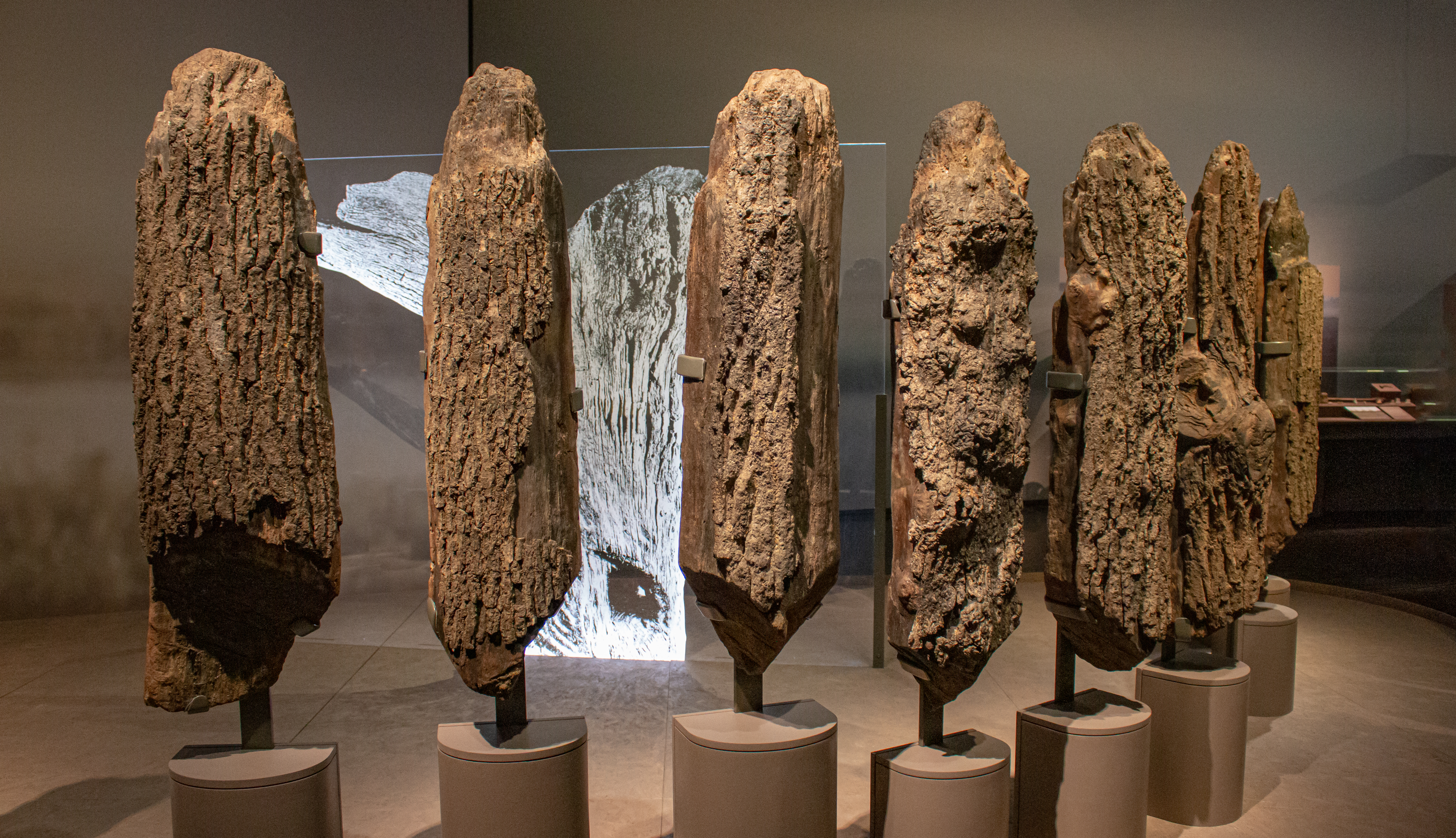
- Seahenge in the temporary exhibition ″The World of Stonehenge″ at the British Museum

- Location in England, United Kingdom
- 52°58′05″N 0°31′17″E
- Type: Timber circle
- Location: England, United Kingdom

History
- Built: Built: 2049 BC; Destroyed: 1999

Site notes
- Material: Oak wood
- Diameter: c. 6.5 meters (original)

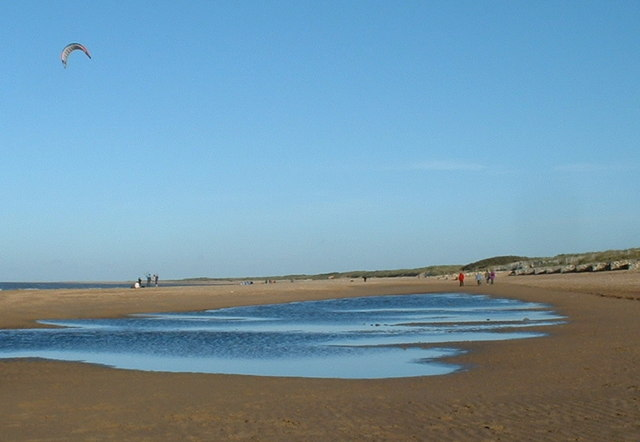
Beach at Old Hunstanton

Seahenge, also known as Holme I, was a prehistoric monument located in the village of Holme-next-the-Sea, near Old Hunstanton in the English county of Norfolk. A timber circle with an upturned tree root in the centre, Seahenge, along with the nearby timber circle Holme II, was built in the spring-summer of 2049 BC, during the early Bronze Age in Britain. Contemporary theory is that they were used for ritual purposes; in particular Holme II has been interpreted as a mortuary monument that may originally have formed the boundary of a burial mound.

In order to preserve the timber in the site from exposure to air, due to recent exposure of the remains by the sea, it was excavated in spring 1999, and its remains taken to an archeological museum and then a maritime museum for preservation of the wood. In 1999, a reproduction was put up by some of the excavators, near the site. In 2008, after further study, a second reproduction was erected near the original's location. Due to controversy about the excavation of Seahenge, Holme II was left in place to be monitored as it is gradually destroyed by erosion.

== Description ==
The site consisted of an outer ring comprising 55 small split oak trunks forming a roughly circular enclosure around 7 by 6 metres (23 by 20 ft). Rather than being placed in individual holes, the timbers had been arranged around a circular construction trench. Their split sides faced inwards and their bark faced outwards (with one exception where the opposite is the case). One of the trunks on the south western side had a narrow Y fork in it, permitting access to the central area. Another post had been placed outside this entrance, which would have prevented anyone from seeing inside. The timbers were set in ground to a depth of 1 metre (3 ft 3 in) from the contemporary surface; although how far they originally extended upwards is not known. In the centre of the ring was a large inverted oak stump. At the time of building, the site was surrounded by salt marshes.

Although the structure's existence had been common knowledge amongst locals for several decades, Seahenge received its name from the press in 1998, who named it after the more famous prehistoric structure Stonehenge in Wiltshire, and was picked up by the local and national media, inducing a great deal of publicity around its excavation. This was only increased due to the protests held against the excavation by both locals, who wanted it to remain as a tourist site, and Neopagans, who believed that the removal of the structure was an insult to the religious beliefs of its original builders, among other concerns.

== Construction ==
Seahenge was constructed during the early Bronze Age, a period of time that saw the increasing adoption of agriculture and sedentary living in Britain. Those constructing the monument made use of at least fifty different bronze axes, (Note: The fact that over fifty different bronze axes were used in the construction of Seahenge was discovered through 3‑D imaging which allowed archaeologists to measure the exact axe curvature and width of each blade that had made a cut in the timber. This revealed that 59 different blades had been used.) which were used to shape the timber to the desired lengths and shapes, at a time when, archaeologists believe, bronze tools were still relatively rare and had only been introduced into Britain a few centuries before.

Using a variety of scientific techniques, archaeologists have come to the conclusion that the trees used in the construction of the monument had all been felled in the same year, 2049 BC, (Note: Dendrochronological evidence provided by Cathy Groves indicated that the trees had to have been felled in either 2454 BC, 2049 BCE, or 2019 BCE whilst radiocarbon dating displayed a date range of between 2200 BCE and 2000 BCE for their felling. Using Bayesian estimation, however, an English Heritage team led by Dr. Alex Bayliss combined the dendrochronological and radiocarbon dates to reveal that the trees had been felled in the year 2049 BCE.) whilst the condition of the sapwood indicated that it had been cut down in spring or early summer. Oak trees would have been transported from some distance as they are not common near the site. According to writer Watson (2005) "Confirming that all the trees had been felled at the same time suggested strongly that the building of the circle was a single event. Further, a great amount of work would have been involved in felling, transporting, preparing and erecting the timbers, so it was likely too that the job was done by a large number of people – possibly an entire community or an extended family – working together."

Seahenge was originally constructed on a salt marsh, and over the centuries the area became a freshwater wetland, as an offshore barrier grew up, preventing sea water from getting access to the area around the circle. This in turn allowed alder trees to grow in the area, which eventually created a layer of peat above the mudflats. With rising sea levels in later millennia, the sea advanced, and eventually sand began to cover the peat. Through this process, Seahenge eventually found itself from once being inland to being on the beach, where it was revealed by the eroding away of the sand and peat by the late 20th century, four thousand years since its original construction.

== Purpose ==
Researchers were unable to determine activity at Seahenge in the centuries after it was built, and its purpose is consequently unknown. However, the presence of Middle and Late Bronze Age pottery at the site suggests that it became a focal point again several centuries after construction. Theories about the site have focused on the idea of inversion, as represented by the upside-down central tree stump and the single post turned 180 degrees from the others, within the circle itself. The theme of inversion has been noticed in some Early Bronze Age burials. Not all the split posts can be accounted for and it has been suggested that another structure was built nearby using them.

Seahenge is so-named by analogy with Stonehenge, but Seahenge did not possess an actual henge (a monumental enclosing ditch, with a bank piled up outside of it), making it a different category of monument. It appears to have had little functionally in common with its namesake. The contemporary ground surface associated with the monument has long since been washed away: No features survive from the time it was erected, and the silt Seahenge stood in when it was found was deposited long after the timber circle was first overwhelmed by the sea.

One theory of use is that Seahenge was a mortuary enclosure for excarnation rather than a meeting-place, like a henge monument. In view of the relatively small diameter of the post circle and its height and its "privacy" entrance, some have suggested it is a "sky burial" (excarnation) site, similar in use (although different in construction) to those found in Tibet, Mongolia, Pakistan, and North America. There is no direct evidence for this.

== Discovery ==
In early spring 1998, John Lorimer, an amateur archaeologist and beachcomber, was catching shrimps with his brother-in-law Gary on Holme beach. The pair found a Bronze Age axe head in the silt, but at first did not know what it was. Intrigued, Lorimer visited the area repeatedly, eventually finding a lone tree stump that had been unearthed on the beach – unusual in that it seemed to be upside down. A metal detectorist friend later recognised the site's importance, so they contacted the Castle Museum in Norwich. Archaeologists at the museum examined the axe head, the second one found on Holme Beach within only a few months. Lorimer continued to monitor the inverted tree stump. Wave erosion gradually exposed a surrounding ring of wooden posts, confirming that the site was an intentional human construction. Lorimer contacted Castle Museum again.

The museum contacted Edwin Rose, at the time Norfolk Landscape Archaeology's Development Control Officer, who then visited the site with Lorimer on 12 August 1998. At first, Rose suspected it was a fish trap from the Anglo-Saxon period, relatively commonplace for the area. But he began to suspect that it might be something else. So Rose inquired whether English Heritage would fund an excavation. They agreed.

== Preliminary excavation ==
Archaeological excavation at Seahenge began October 1998, under site director Mark Brennand of the Norfolk Archaeological Unit. It proved a difficult site to excavate. Sea tides restricted trial trench excavating work to between one and four hours per day. A dendrochronological sample extracted from the stump was sent for analysis at Sheffield University. By January 1999, preliminary results indicated a Bronze Age monument. Despite projected expense, English Heritage decided full excavation would be worthwhile, because the site had begun to suffer from erosion: Sections of wood had been exposed to corrosive oxygen and salt brine after millennia protected in the mud.

== Media interest ==
Initially, there was little media interest in the excavation, with it only being reported in archaeological publications like the Council of British Archaeology's British Archaeology magazine and a few local Norfolk-based media outlets. This changed on Saturday 9 January 1999, when The Independent ran a front-page story by environmental correspondent, Michael McCarthy, headlined "Shifting sands reveal 'Stonehenge of the Sea'". The Independent′s article sparked articles in rival newspapers, with the Eastern Daily Press picking up the story for a two-page feature entitled "Our Stonehenge Beneath the Sea" on Monday 11 January. These stories repeated comparisons to Stonehenge, one of England's most famous national treasures, despite the many differences between the two sites. Eventually the site gained the popular title of "Seahenge".

Soon a great debate began in the media, with some adherents involved in the Neopagan and New Age movements arguing that they had "a kind of spiritual ownership of the circle". They wanted it left in situ and opposed archaeological excavation. Local tourism organisations also wanted it left in situ, as the site was sure to attract tourism. The prospect of tourists visiting the beach to see the monument meanwhile brought criticism from local wildlife organisations such as the Norfolk Wildlife Trust, who noted how within the first three months of 1999, 5,000 visitors had come to see the monument. Tourist traffic disturbed feeding wader birds in Holme Dunes National Nature Reserve.

== Excavation ==
The press were putting forward ideas of saving and preserving the monument where it was, something archaeologists explained was impossible. English Heritage's chief archaeologist, Geoffrey Wainright, eventually gave the go ahead for a full excavation in March 1999. The procedure would cost £500,000, and the timbers would be conserved at the Fenland Archaeological Trust's field centre at Flag Fen in Cambridgeshire.

Excavation began on Wednesday 26 May 1999, by a team from Norfolk Archaeological Unit led by Mark Brennand. Again they found it a particularly daunting and difficult site, as they were only able to excavate for a few hours a day. Much of that limited time was taken up removing water that built up overnight, and fish and other animals that had set up residence there.

== Protests ==
The team also had to contend with protests mounted both by locals and by Neopagan groups led by Parish Council Chairman Geoff Needham, a former fisherman.

English Heritage had taken part in meetings with protest groups, but neither side changed their position. One of the most vocal protesters, the Neopagan and conservationist Buster Nolan, informed a reporter from the Eastern Daily Press that "Seahenge has more meaning and power on the beach here at Holme than it does anywhere else ... This is 60 grand being spent by archaeologists who are patting each other on the back, telling each other they're doing the right thing. It's a farce."

Nolan went on to employ some local solicitors in an attempt to get the courts to intercede on the protesters' behalf, receiving donations from the Council of British Druid Orders and from a local businessman, Mervyn Lambert, who told reporters that "The people of Norfolk should have more balls ... I'm amazed they're allowing it to happen." But solicitors refused to take up the case, believing that they could not possibly win against English Heritage.

English Heritage gained an interim injunction banning several of the most prominent protesters from the vicinity of the site, including Des Crow, Geoff Needham, Buster Nolan, and Rollo Maughfling, who at one point climbed on top of Seahenge to declare an eight-point proclamation. Needham and Maughfling, however, successfully contested the ban, as the court agreed that neither of them had attempted to obstruct the archaeologists' work. The publicity and controversy surrounding the excavation led the British television company Channel 4 to commission a special episode of their archaeological series Time Team documenting the excavation itself and staging an experimental archaeology reconstruction of the Bronze Age site.

After several weeks' work, the excavators decided to physically remove the main timbers from the site, an event for which the media had been tipped off. A wide variety of protesters turned up, along with police to ensure that they did not cause trouble for the excavators. However, as the central tree stump was being pulled out by a digger, a young protester ran under the rope cordoning off the site and headed towards the excavation until she was restrained by excavators and then by police.

== Conservation ==
With Seahenge excavated, the timbers that it had been built out of were transported 50 miles (80 km) away to the Fenland Archaeology Trust's field centre at Flag Fen in Cambridgeshire, where they immediately underwent conservation by being immersed in fresh water. The timbers were then cleaned of attached mud and placed in permanent storage. English Heritage employed laser scan technology (developed by Alistair Carty of Archaeoptics) to precisely image timbers in three dimensions, allowing archaeologists to create a virtual model of the whole site. At Flag Fen, they were then continually soaked in wax-emulsified water to slowly (over years) replace the moisture in the wood with wax. Conservation included treatment with polyethylene glycol. They were later transferred to Portsmouth where maritime archaeology experts at the Mary Rose Trust continued the programme at their purpose-built site.

== Reconstruction ==
Conservation work is complete, with a reconstructed Seahenge near its original site, at the Lynn Museum and opened to the public in April 2008.

== Exhibition ==
In February 2022, timber from Holme I was displayed at The World of Stonehenge exhibition at British Museum, from 17 February 2022 until 17 July 2022.

== Holme II ==
One hundred metres east, another, much larger ring was found, consisting of two concentric timber circles surrounding a hurdle-lined pit containing two oak logs. Known as Holme II, dendrochronology gives a date identical to Seahenge: 2049 BC. This is the first time that two adjacent prehistoric monuments have been shown to have been built together. Details of the construction of Holme II differ from that of Holme I (Seahenge): for instance the palisade of Holme I had the tree bark intact, while it was removed for Holme II, giving the two enclosures contrasting dark and light colours. One suggestion is that the upturned roots in Holme I were used for excarnation, while the remains were later buried in Holme II, which may have contained a burial mound (now washed away) extending to the inner timber circle which would have formed the revetment (outer securing border) of the mound.

Although also threatened with destruction by the sea, this site has been left in situ and exposed to the tidal actions of the sea. This decision by English Heritage relates to the controversy over digging Holme I.

== In popular culture ==
Jean-Jacques Burnel, bassist of the Stranglers, was living in Holme-next-the-Sea at the time of the discovery. The monument inspired him to write the songs on the band's 2004 album Norfolk Coast.

Seahenge provides the inspiration for a timber circle depicted in Catherine Fisher's 2005 novel Darkhenge. Fisher discusses a prehistoric monument featuring an upturned oak tree surrounded by 24 timbers, each symbolising one of the characters in the ogham tree alphabet. This circle, known as Darkhenge, is described as being located at Avebury in Wiltshire and is portrayed as being the portal to Annwyn, the underworld of Welsh mythology.

Seahenge can be visited in the 2020 video game Assassin's Creed: Valhalla.

== See also ==
- Beaker culture
