= Nelson Museum =

Nelson Museum may refer to the following museums covering the life of Horatio Nelson

- Norfolk Nelson Museum
- Monmouth Museum
- Nelson Provincial Museum
