= Sarah Martin =

Sarah or Sara Martin may refer to:

- Sarah Martin (philanthropist) (1791–1843), British philanthropist and prison visitor
- Sara Martin (1884–1955), American blues singer
- Sarah Martin (musician) (born 1974), British musician

== See also ==
- Sara Martins (born 1977), Portuguese-born French actress
- Sara Martín (born 1999), Spanish cyclist
