= Helen Hart (suffragist) =

British Australian suffragist, lecturer, and preacher (1839-1908)

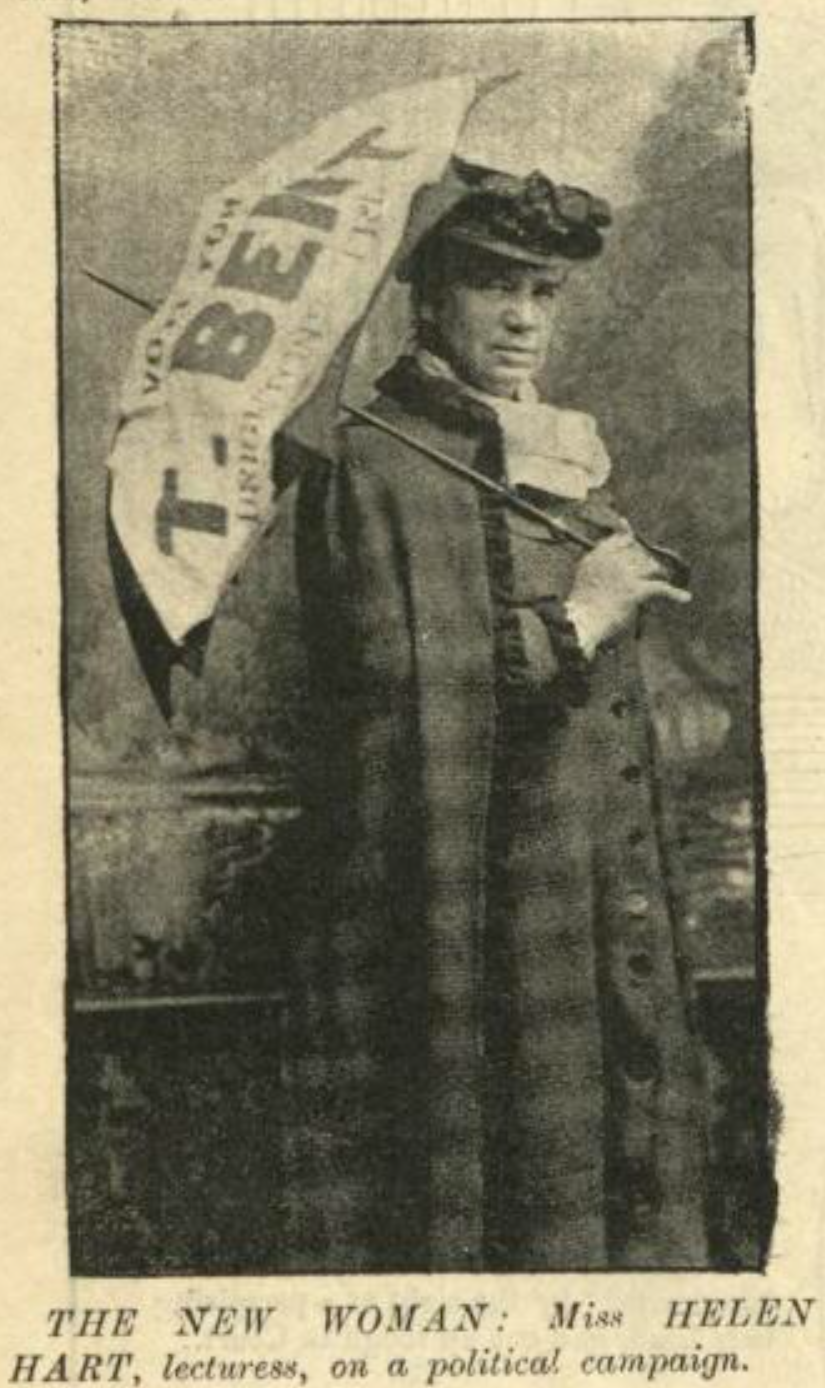
- Hart posing for a campaign photograph for Thomas Bent, 1894
- Born: 10 October 1839; Birmingham, England
- Died: 16 July 1908 (aged 68); South Yarra, Victoria, Australia
- Occupations: Feminist; activist; Preacher; Journalist; Nurse
- Years active: 1880-1908

Helen Hart (10 October 1839 – 16 July 1908), was a British born Australian suffragist, lecturer, nurse, and journalist who was well known in Melbourne, Australia in the late 19th century and early 20th century for giving public lectures on women's rights, temperance, and Christianity. She proclaimed herself 'the founder of women's suffrage in Australasia'. While this is not accurate, it is true that she was the first to publicly lecture on the matter in some parts of Australia, and New Zealand during her extensive tours of regional areas.

Other members of the Australian suffrage movement did not support Hart, nor acknowledge her contributions. She spent her final years expressing resentment about the movement's lack of acceptance and inclusion of her. Her mental health declined in her later years, and she died in a boarding house in South Yarra, after unsuccessfully attempting to raise funds to return to England for many years.

== Early life ==
Hart was likely born on 10 October 1839 in Birmingham to Elizabeth Hart née Birch, and Henry Hart, a gun maker, although research is not definitively conclusive on her exact birth date. Some records state she was born on 6 March 1842. She was one of at least seven children. Hart's mother died of Typhus in 1847, and her father remarried in 1850. Hart participated in anti-slavery and temperance movements since childhood. She also began preaching in the open air when she was 19.

=== Schooling ===
It is unknown where Hart undertook her schooling, however, in later years she stated she experienced abuses such as starvation and whippings as encouragement to study while she was at school.

== Occupation ==
=== London and Birmingham 1858 - 1879 ===
Hart had moved from Birmingham to London, aged 19, sometime around 1858. She continued to live between the two cities, returning to Birmingham in the summer to preach the gospel. She initially worked as a servant, and then she worked as a journalist, although it is unknown for which publications. She got involved in the suffrage movement. Her views on women's rights were radical, she believed that women were entitled to vote as a right, because they paid taxes and were required to follow the law.

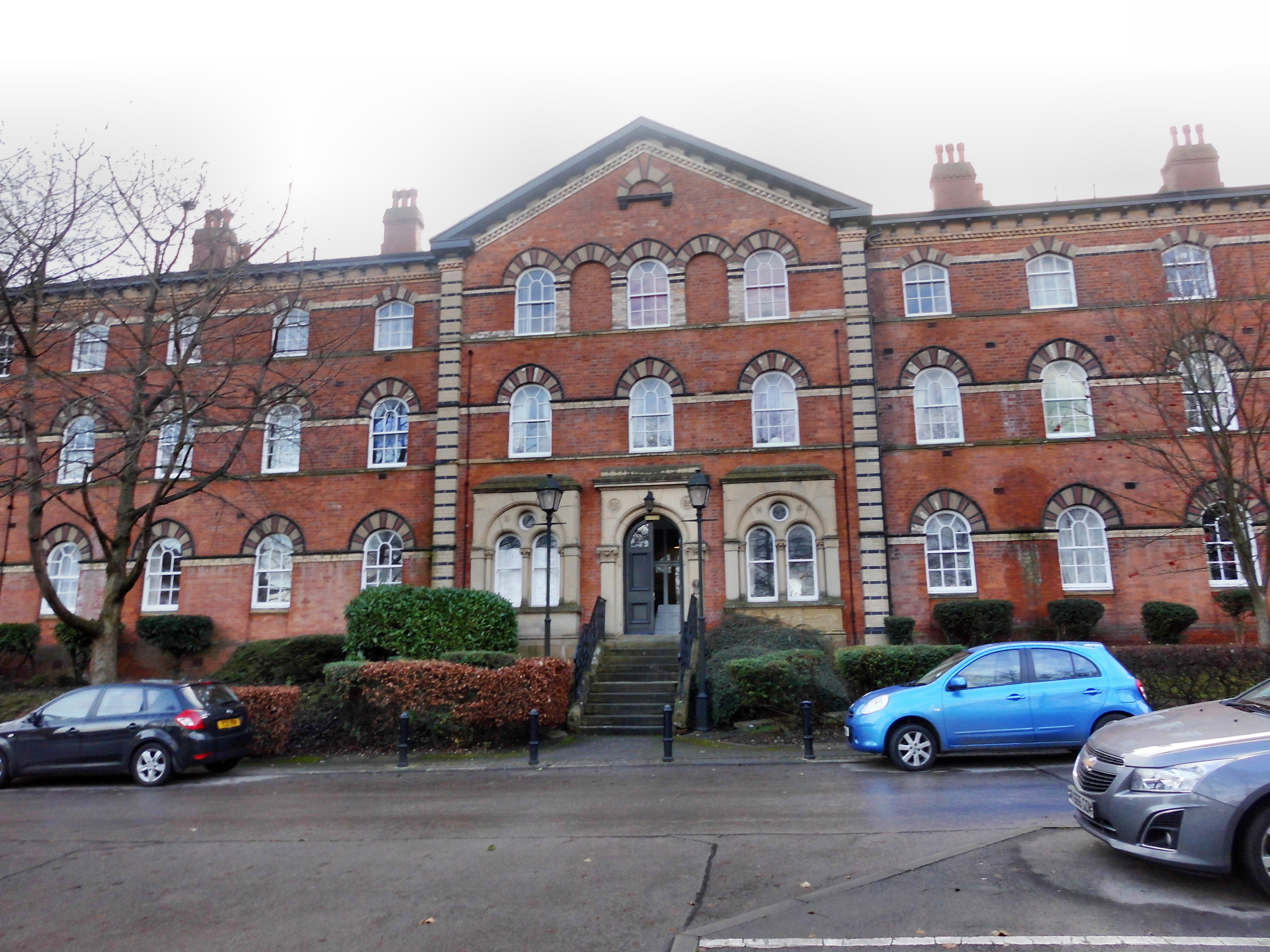
Building which formerly housed the Pontefract Union Workhouse, where Hart was employed in 1875.

Hart worked at a variety of workhouses in the United Kingdom between 1875 and 1877. Records suggest she had a tumultuous experience in these jobs, engaging in conflict with her employers. Hart left her nursing job at Pontefract Union Workhouse, Yorkshire, in February of 1875 after a disagreement with the master. She raised concerns with the Poor Law Board about the management of the workhouse. Later, she worked at Cardiff Union Workhouse, in 1876, where she expressed concern for the shortage of food for the patients. In November of that year her employment was ended due to "Insubordination". She worked at Mitford and Launditch Union Workhouse, now known as Gressenhall Farm and Workhouse, between December 1876 and January 1877, where the medical officer recorded their reservations about her suitability as a nurse due to her inefficiency, and lack of tact.

=== New Zealand 1879 - 1880 ===
In 1879 Hart travelled to New Zealand by taking a role as matron on a migrant ship. She brought letters of recommendation from English clergyman. Hart felt deceived by the reports she had read in the English newspapers of the plentiful employment opportunities for women in New Zealand, as after she arrived she found it difficult to find work, and saw that the situation for young women was dire. She began to lecture again, and toured the South Island.

=== Australia from 1880 ===
In December of 1880, Hart travelled to Melbourne and, beginning at Dr John Singleton's Collingwood Mission Hall, she began giving lectures around Melbourne on issues such as Women's rights, temperance, politics, and public health. She lived in Australia for the rest of her life, giving lectures, selling her poetry and portraits. She travelled to the regions in Victoria, New South Wales, South Australia, and Tasmania. She proclaimed herself the 'founder of Women's Suffrage in Australasia', which was not true, however, she was the first to speak on women's rights in many regions of Australia and on the South Island of New Zealand. She also styled herself as 'Rev. Helen Hart' at times from the mid-1880s.

In 1886, while stopping in Castlemaine to deliver a lecture, Hart had a run in with R. H. McLean, the editor of a local newspaper called the Leader, after he published comments about her. She attended his office and in front of a gathering crowd of amused onlookers, she horsewhipped him with a toy whip she purchased that day. McLean pressed charges of assault. The court appearance also gained a large audience who were entertained by Hart's retelling of the events. Hart was fined £2 12s 6d.

While Hart experienced popularity, and her lectures often received positive reception, she was also subject to derision, physical and sexual assault, including on one occasion having fireworks thrown at her. She was ridiculed for dressing in a shabby manner, and was describe as having masculine traits in an era when women were expected to emphasise their femininity. However, she was self-confident, outgoing, clever and eloquent. Hart did not experience much personal or financial success. However, she was fiercely independent, proud of her status as a single woman, and, until her old age, she financially supported herself with her lecturing, selling of poems and photo. In her later years, she continued this work, but her income was supplemented by charity and appeals for funds when she experienced hardships.

After being stalked for many years, and with no action from police to assist her in the matter, Hart's mental health began to decline from the mid-1890s. She developed paranoid beliefs in conspiracies against her, and her writing and behaviour became erratic. She complained of a lack of support and acknowledgement from the women's rights movements. Other members of the suffrage movement did not mention her, nor her contributions. Despite her early popularity, dedicated efforts to lecture on women's rights, and the significant media coverage throughout her life, she was left out of the historical records of the Australian suffrage movement.

For many years prior to her death, Hart unsuccessfully attempted to raise the funds to return home to England where her family resided, and where she hoped to join the Suffragette movement.

== Death and legacy ==
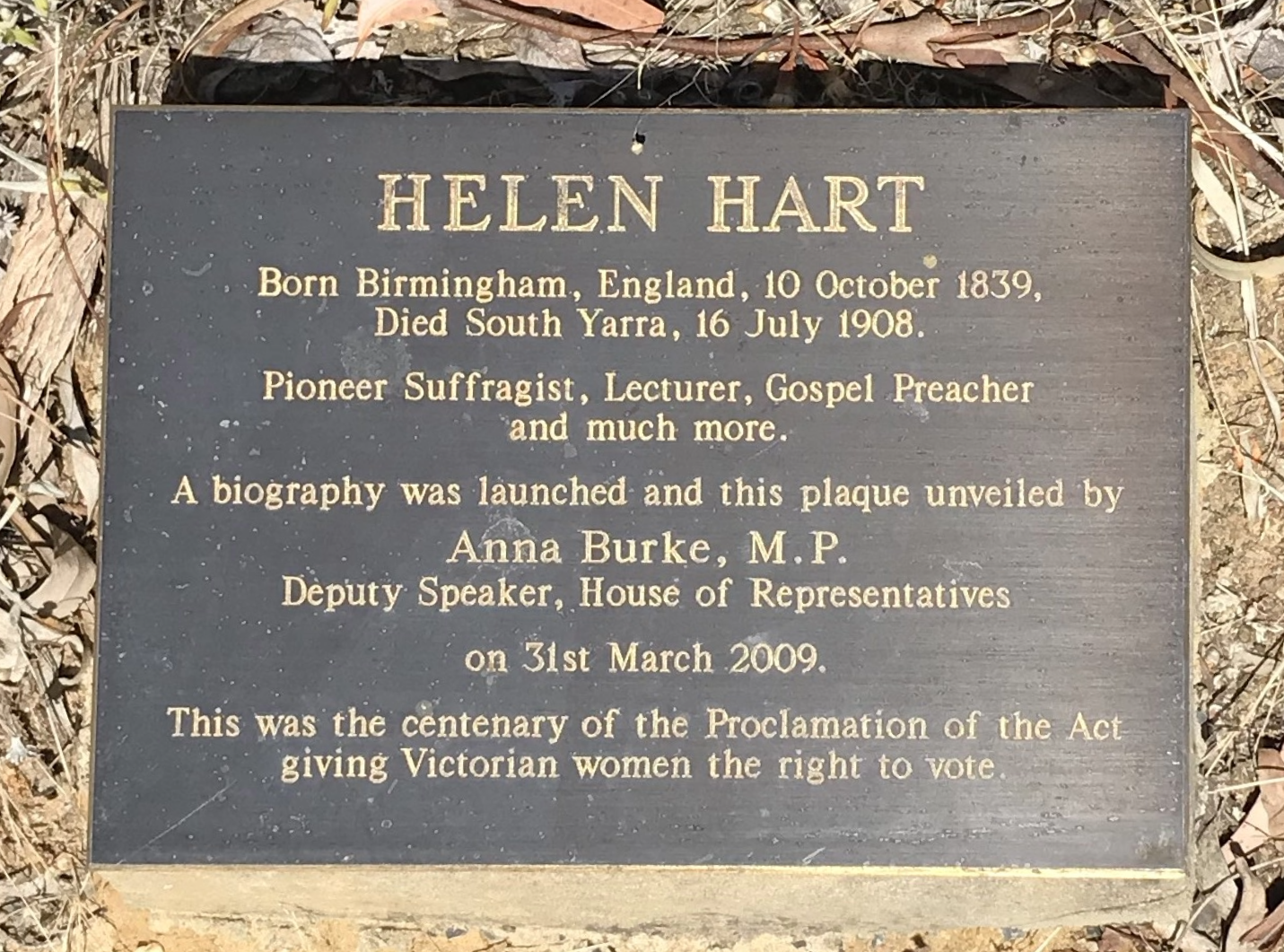
Hart's grave marker plaque, Boroondara Cemetery.

Hart died, in South Yarra, on 16 July 1908, at 11 o'clock in the evening at a boarding house. She had been unwell with a cold for a number of weeks. On the evening of her death she retired to bed at 8pm, only to call for the landlady to tell her she felt unwell, and to ask her to rub her hands. A doctor was called for, but Hart died before he arrived. A post mortem found she died of natural causes.

On 31 March 2009, an autobiography of Hart by Author Helen D. Harris was launched by Anna Burke, and at the same time, a plaque was placed on Hart's unmarked grave at Boroondara Cemetery.

In 2024, researchers at Gressenhall Farm and Workhouse were preparing for an exhibition titled "Making the Rounds: Stories of Workhouse Nurses Told in Textiles". They came across records of a nurse called Helen Hart who had worked at a variety of workhouses in the United Kingdom between 1875 and 1877. This nurse had raised concerns about the management and conditions of the workhouses she worked at. Through further research they discovered this was the same Helen Hart who later became a women's rights activist in Australia.
