= Time Museum, Tehran =

Museum in Tehran, Iran

Coordinates: 35.8056°N 51.4193°E

Time Museum
- تماشاگه زمان
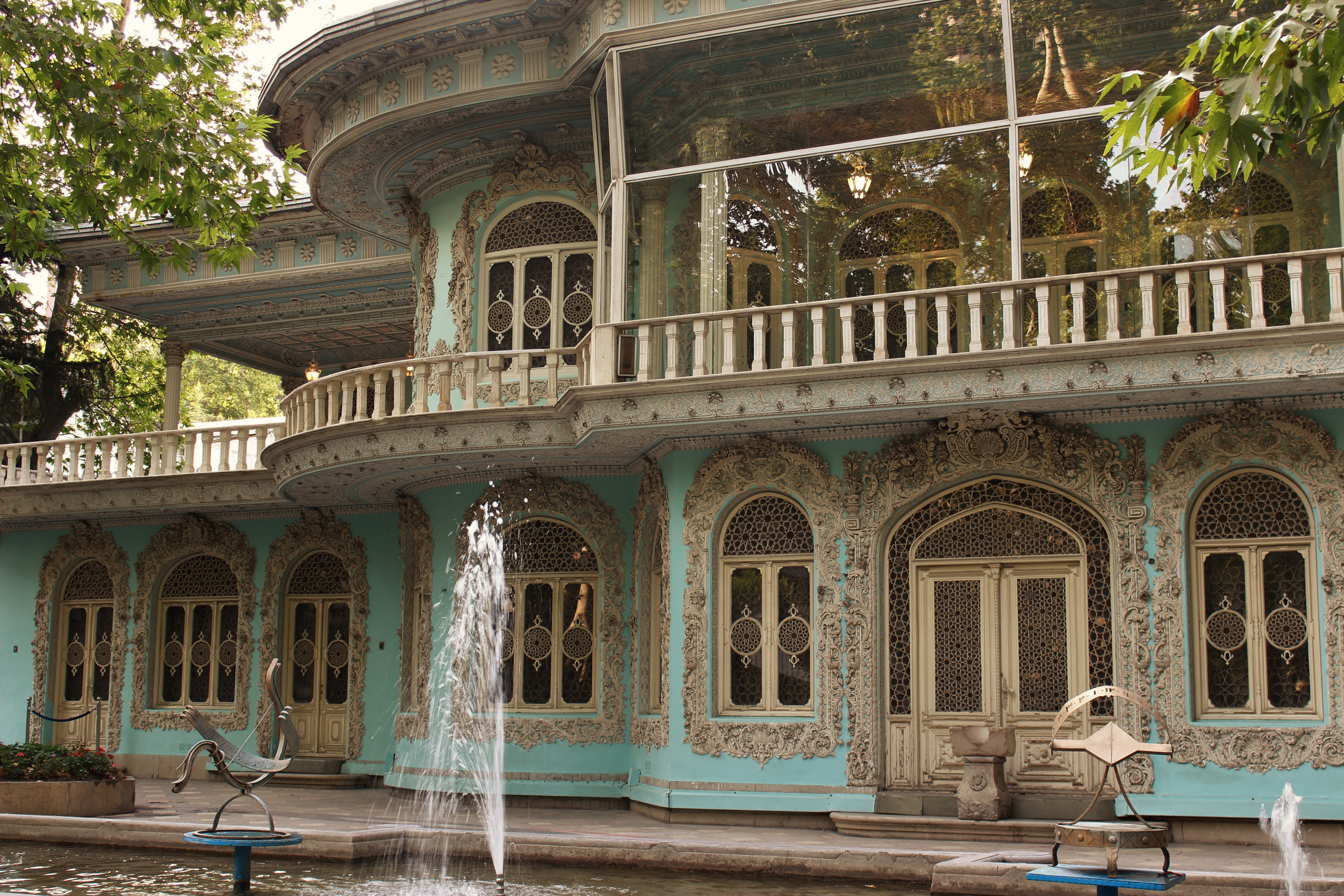
- Exterior view
- Interactive map of the Time Museum area
- Former names: House of Hossein Khodadad
- Alternative names: Clock Museum

General information
- Status: Open
- Location: Zafaraniyeh, Tehran, Iran

The Time Museum (Persian: تماشاگه زمان) or the Hossein Khodadad House (خانه حسین خداداد) is a museum in Tehran, Iran. The museum specialises in clocks and other time-measuring devices.

== History ==
The five hectares large garden that surrounds the building possibly existed and had structures in it as far back as the reign of Mohammad Shah Qajar or Naser al-Din Shah Qajar. In 1963–64, it was purchased by Hossein Khodadad, an Iranian industrialist who initiated the repairing and restructuring of the house. The building's wooden structure was replaced with a steel one and extensive stucco work was added to its exterior in a process that took 12 years to complete.

Khodadad lived in the house for just one year before the 1979 Iranian Revolution, when it was confiscated by the new government. It was turned into the Time Museum in 1999–2000 with a collection of around a thousand old clocks.

On 22 January 2004, it was listed among the national heritage sites of Iran with the number 10868.

== Collection ==
The Time Museum contains a large number of clocks and watches. Other types of measuring devices in its collection include water clocks, hourglasses, sundials, and a variety of clocks that measured time by the progressive burning of an object such as a candle or rope. The museum also holds individual clocks and watches that were owned by notable historical figures.

== Gallery ==
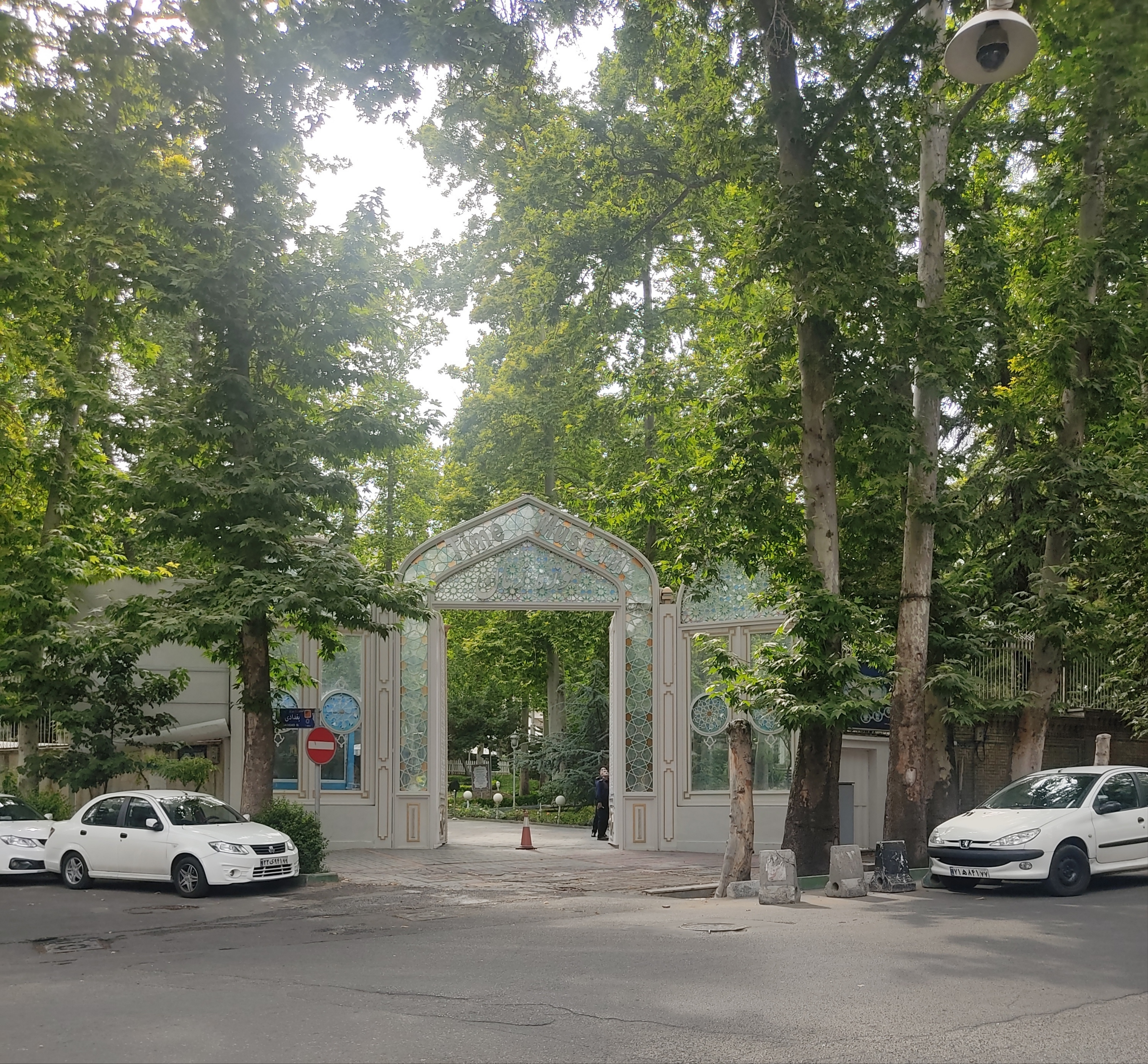

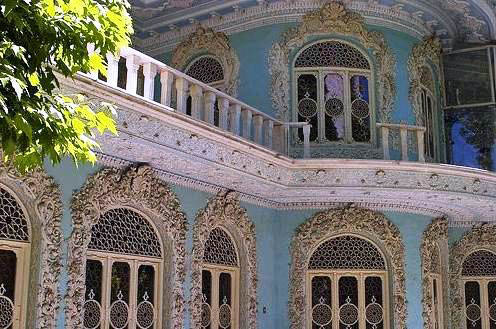

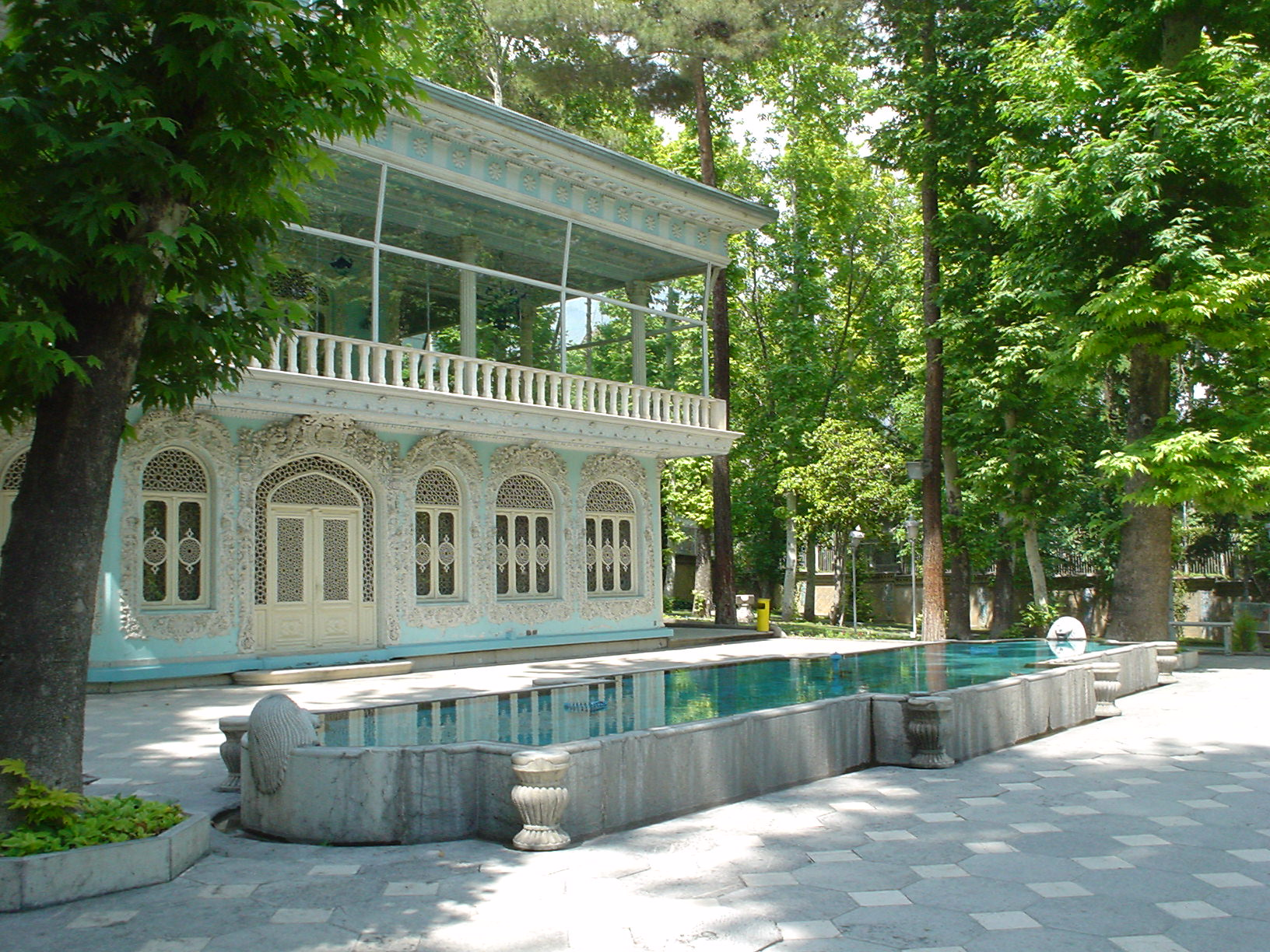

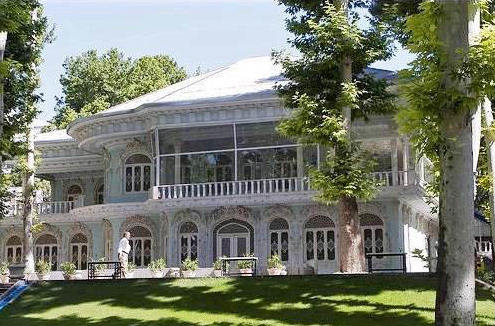

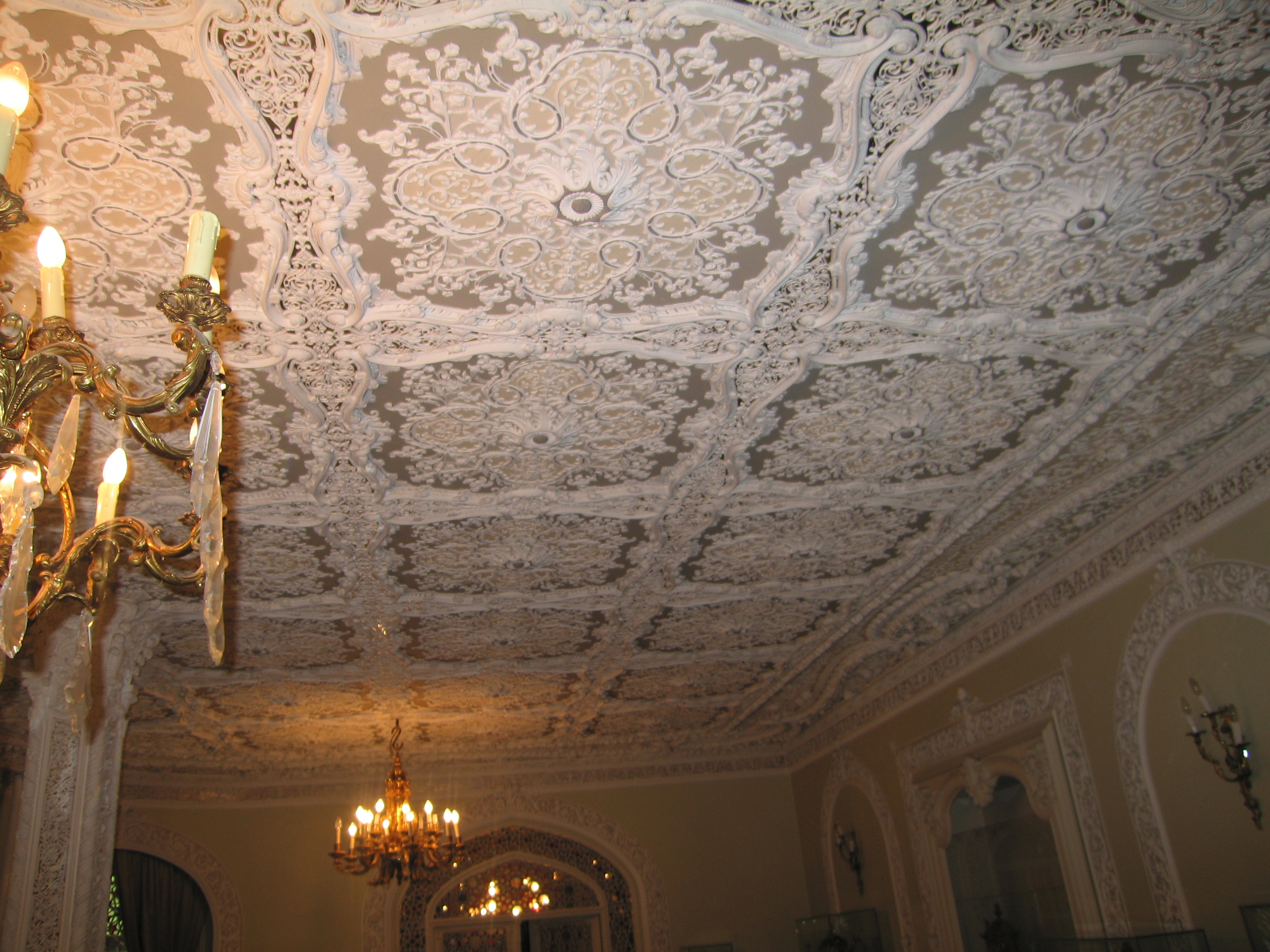

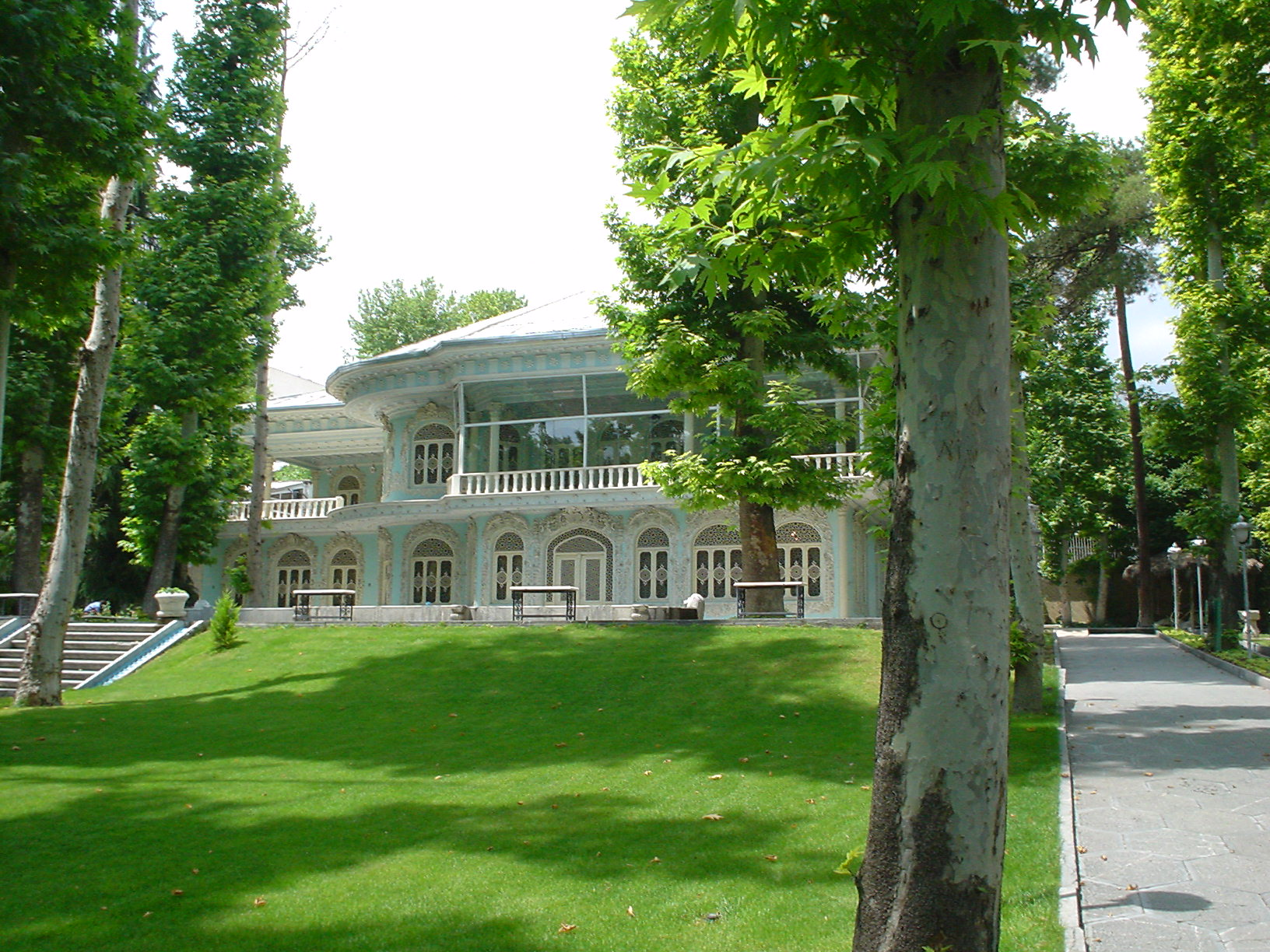

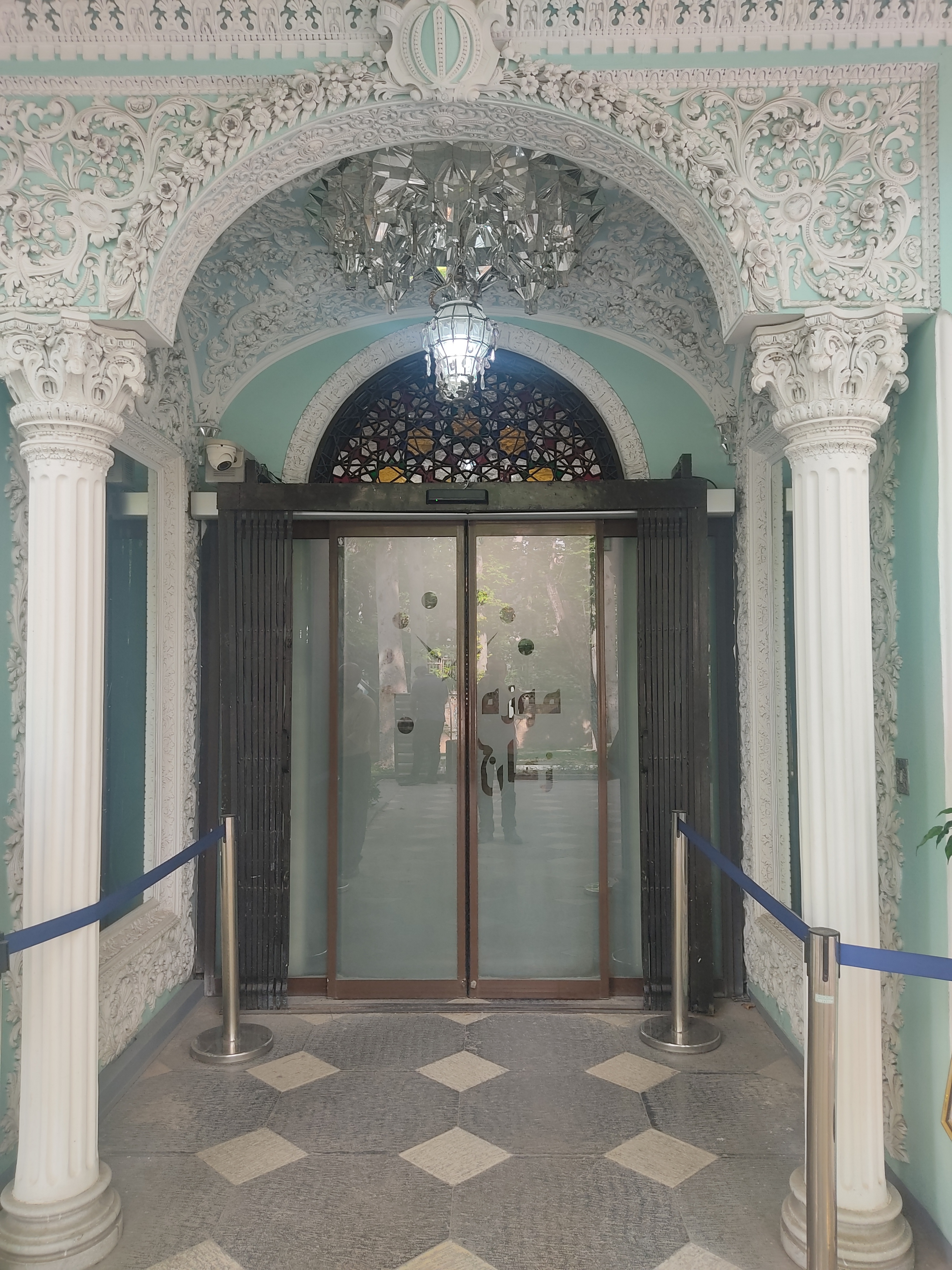

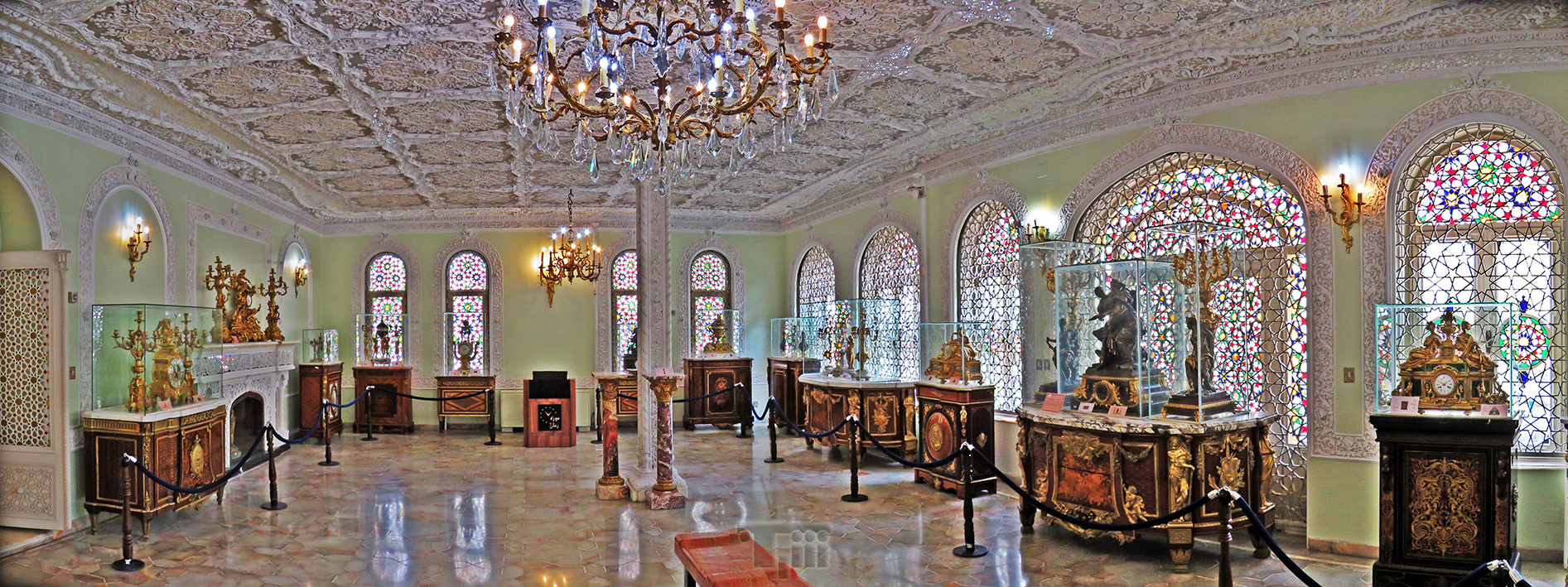

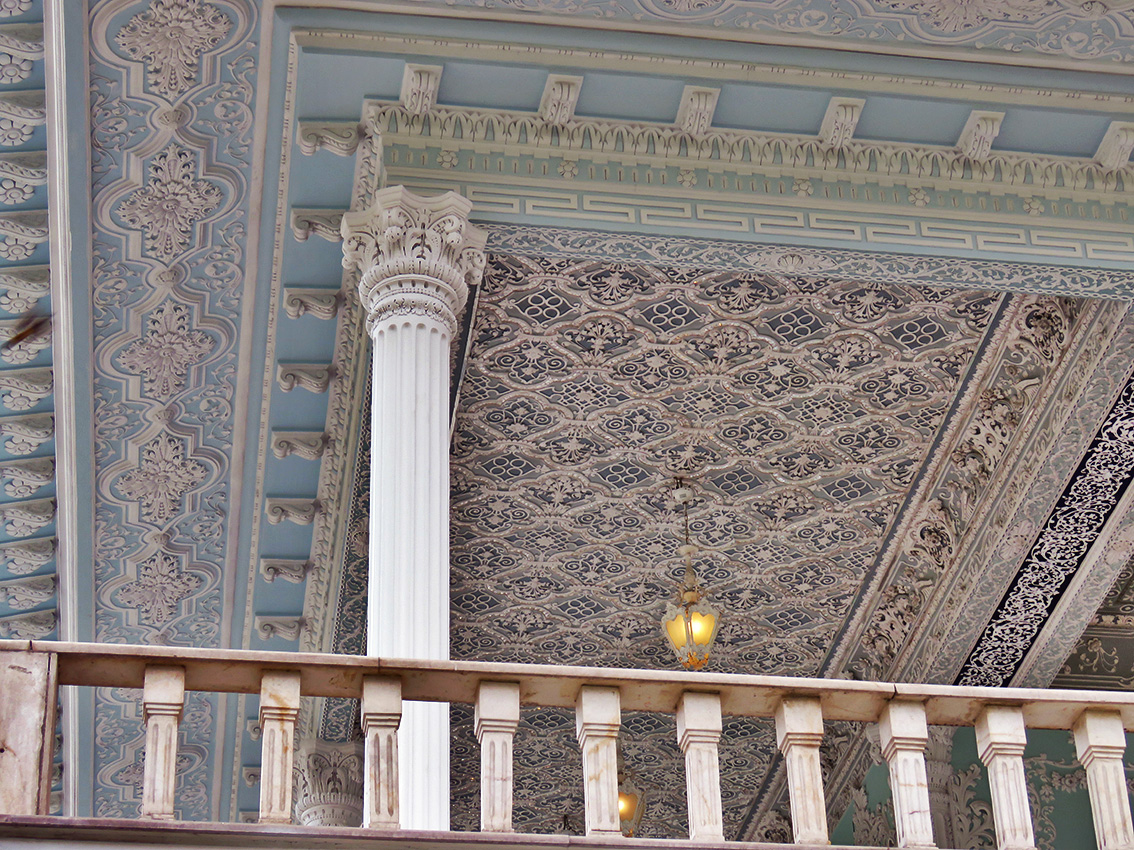

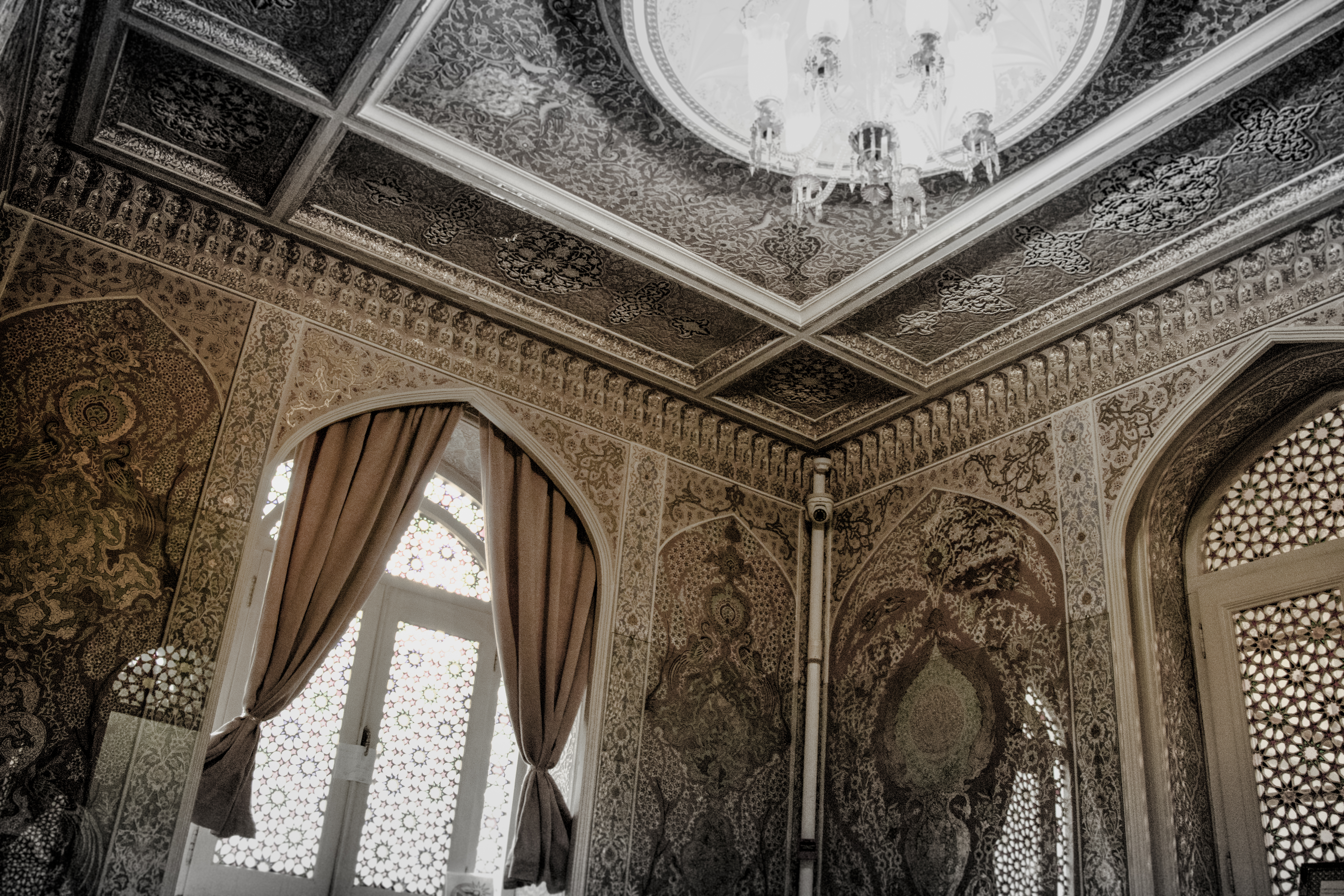
