= Sarah Martin (philanthropist) =

British philanthropist

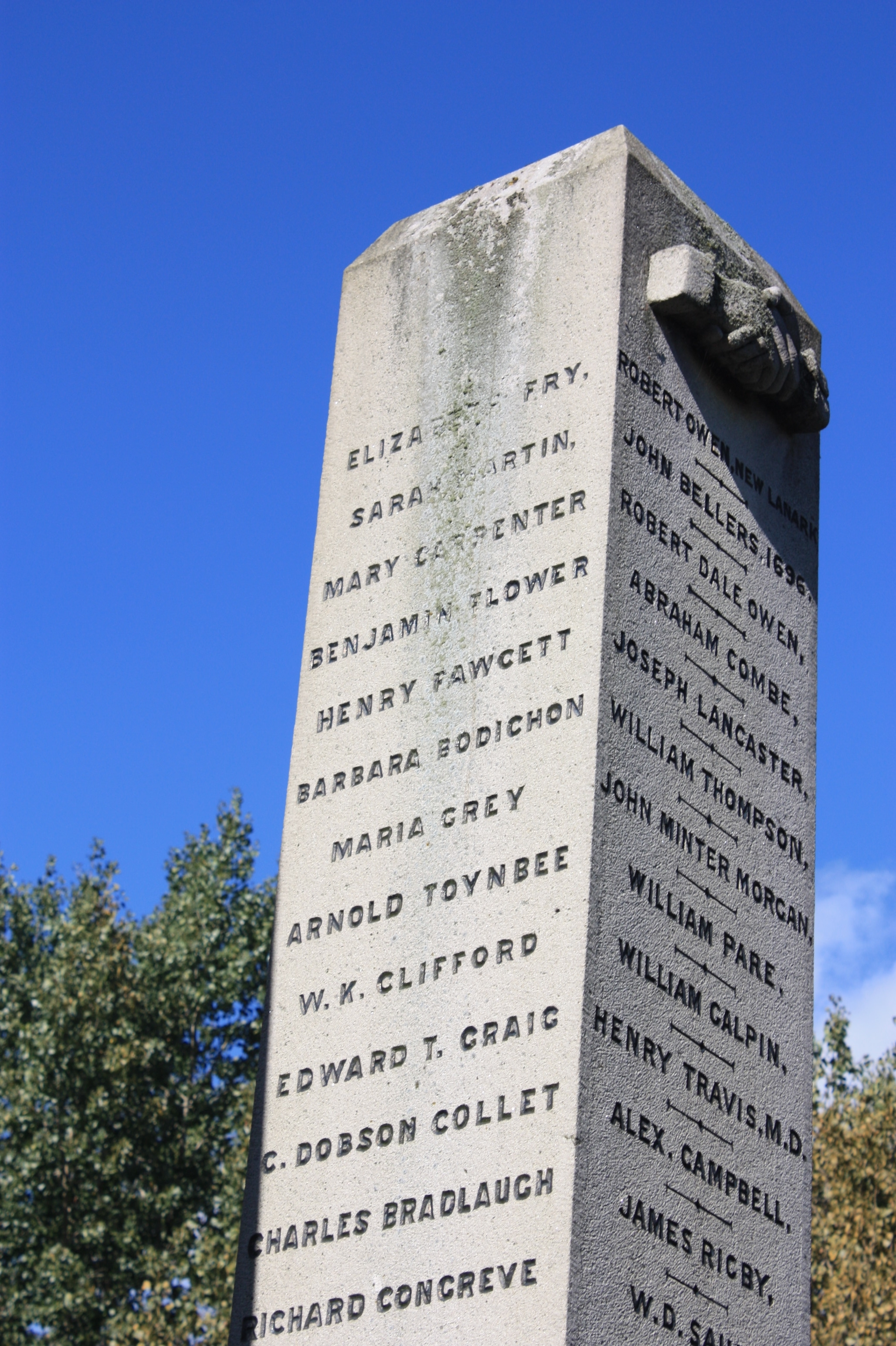
Sarah Martin's name on the Reformers’ Monument, Kensal Green Cemetery

Sarah Martin (1791 – 15 October 1843) was a prison visitor and philanthropist. She was born at Great Yarmouth; and lived in nearby Caister. She earned her living by dressmaking, and devoted much of her time amongst criminals in the Tolhouse Gaol in Great Yarmouth.

== Early life ==
Born in June 1791, her father was a local tradesman. Orphaned at an early age, she was raised by her grandmother, a glovemaker. At the age of fourteen, she was apprenticed to a dressmaker in Yarmouth. After a religious conversion at the age of nineteen, she began to teach Sunday school.

After this she began to provide comfort for those in the workhouse infirmary. Every Monday for seven years, she provided educational instruction to the workhouse children. Eventually a schoolroom was constructed in the yard. In 1838, when a new workhouse was built, a master and schoolmistress were appointed a regular provision made for instruction. She then directed her attention to teaching factory girls at the chancel of St. Nicholas Church.

== Prison visits ==
She took an interest in the prisoners' welfare and began visiting the gaol in 1818. At first she read the bible to prisoners, later she began to hold Sunday services to inspire the inmates to improve their lives. Martin offered practical help alongside spiritual advice and taught them how to read and write as well as make items like spoons and books, which they sold. The prisoners were able to develop a sense of purpose and pride, using their earnings to buy clothes.

== Death and afterwards ==
After becoming very ill Sarah Martin died on 15 October 1843 and was buried at Holy Trinity, Caister-on-Sea. A collection of her poems entitled Selections from the Poetical Remains of Miss S. Martin was published in 1845. Sarah Martin's monument can be found in Great Yarmouth Minster. Sarah Martin's name is on the Reformers’ Monument, in Kensal Green Cemetery.
