= Norfolk Nelson Museum =

Former museum in Great Yarmouth, Norfolk, England

Coordinates: 52.6037°N 1.7266°E

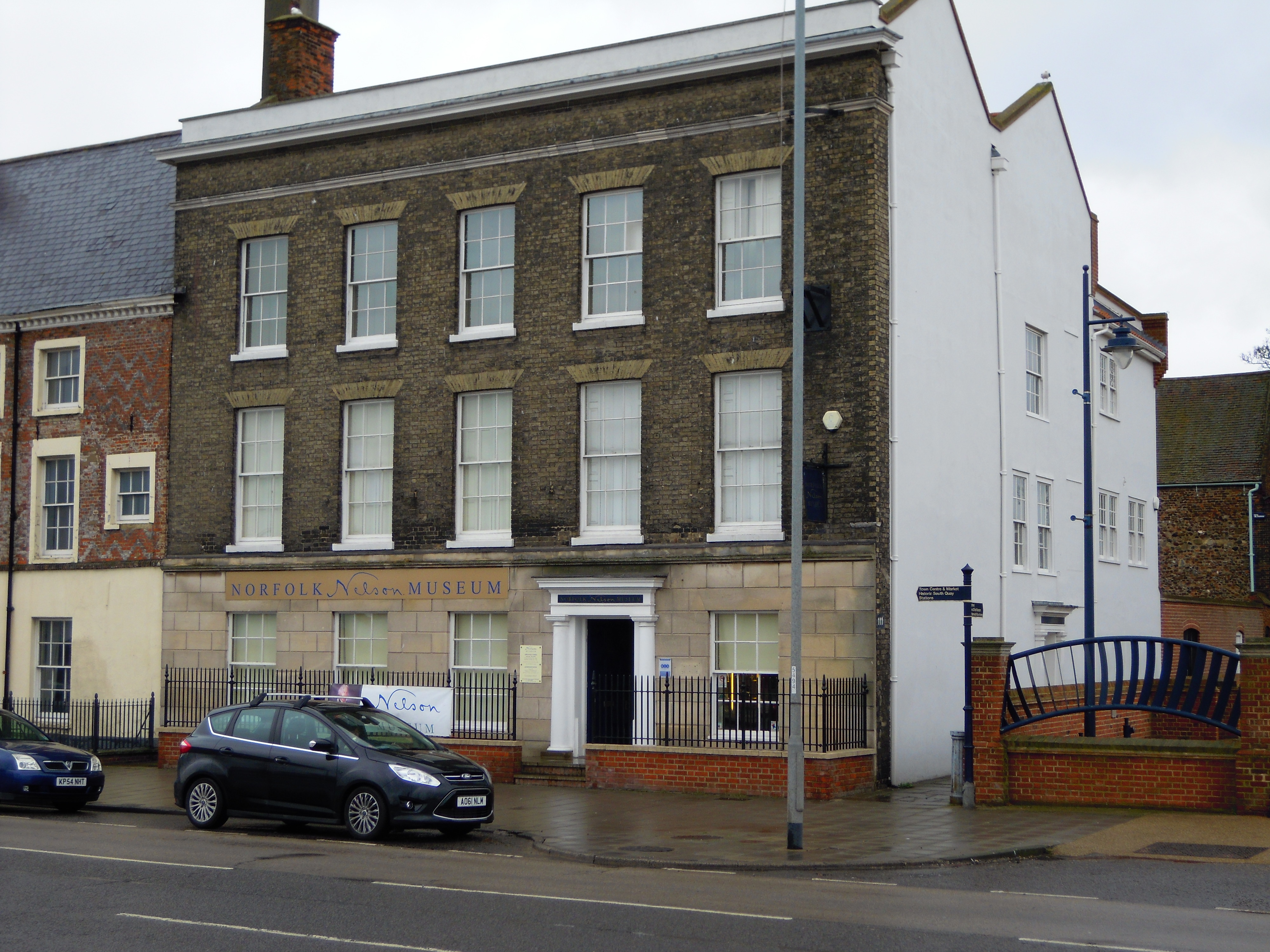
The Nelson Museum in 2012

The Nelson Museum was a small museum South Quay in Great Yarmouth, Norfolk, which celebrated the life and times of Admiral Horatio Nelson. It operated from a heritage listed building from 2002 until 2019, when it closed due to funding problems and declining visitor numbers. The museum collection, which included more than 2,000 items, was put into storage.

== Museum ==
The Nelson Museum was a small museum housed in a Grade II listed Georgian Merchant's house on South Quay in Great Yarmouth, Norfolk. It was formed from the collection of local agriculturalist Ben Burgess, who was a lifelong collector of Nelson related artefacts. Opened by the Duke of Edinburgh in 2002, the museum celebrated the life and times of Admiral Horatio Nelson. There were galleries, a new temporary exhibition every two years, and interactive exhibits and games for children.

The museum was forced to close in October 2019 due to declining visitor numbers and the withdrawal of funding by Great Yarmouth Borough Council. The collection, comprising over 2,000 items including an oil portrait of Nelson and some of his original letters, was put into storage.

== Building ==
The building the museum was housed in is a Grade II listed Georgian house. It had previously been the home of Sir George England in the 17th century, and variously since then a police headquarters and a drapers shop. Since the closure of the museum, an art gallery had operated in the building until 2023. In 2024 it was announced that the Great Yarmouth Borough Council's development committee members had approved a scheme to turn the building into a cafe, art gallery and shop. Two artist studios would be built in the walled garden, and the upper floors turned into an apartment.

== See also ==
- National Maritime Museum
