= Gressenhall =

Village in Norfolk, England

Coordinates: 52.699165°N 0.902245°E

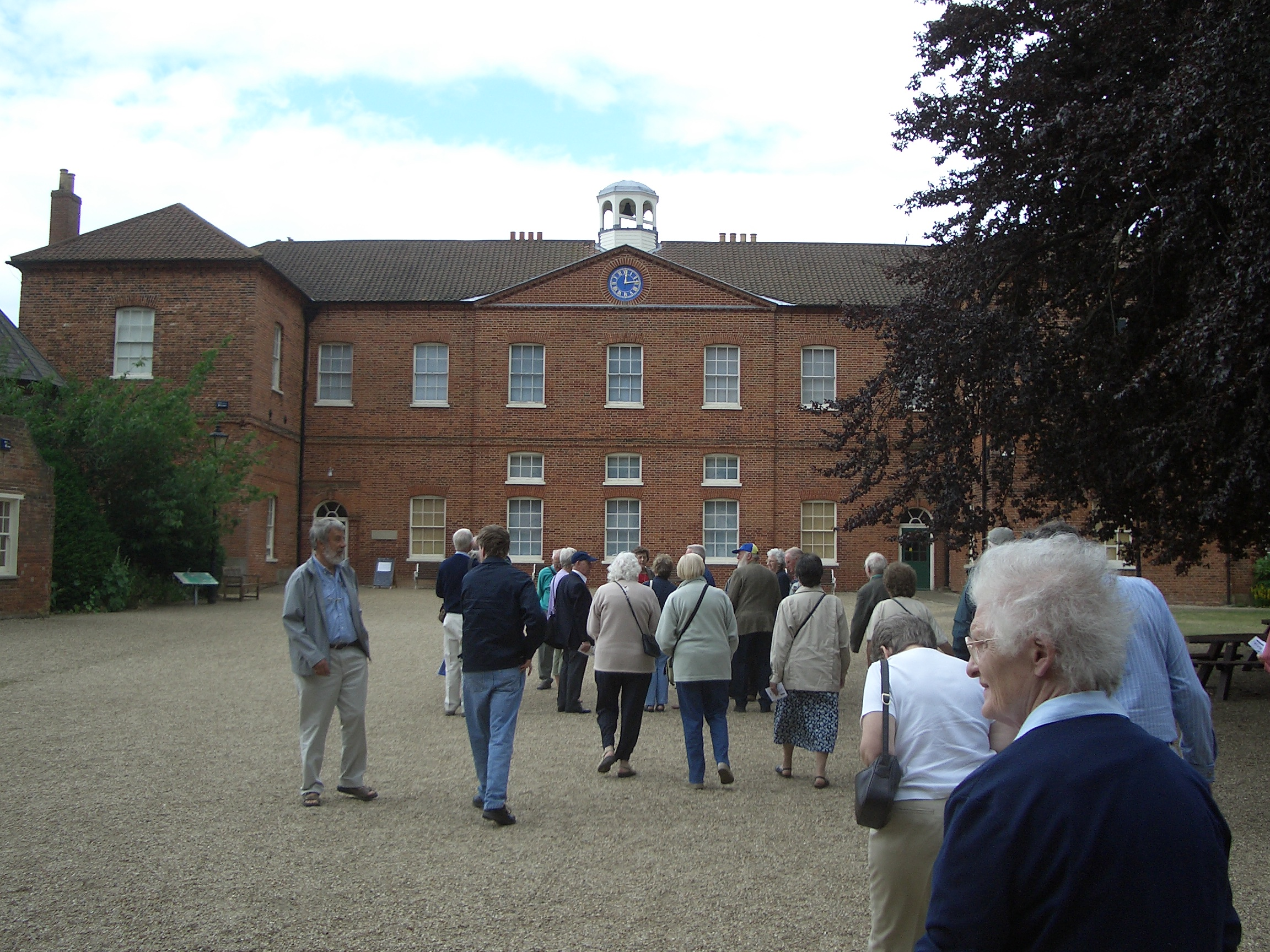
- Gressenhall Workhouse Museum.

- Location within Norfolk
- Area: 4.07 sq mi (10.5 km^{2})
- Population: 1,032 (2021 census)
  - Density: 254/sq mi (98/km^{2})
- OS grid reference: TF964166
- Civil parish: Gressenhall
- District: Breckland
- Shire county: Norfolk
- Region: East
- Country: England
- Sovereign state: United Kingdom
- Post town: DEREHAM
- Postcode district: NR19, NR20
- Dialling code: 01362
- Police: Norfolk
- Fire: Norfolk
- Ambulance: East of England
- UK Parliament: Mid Norfolk

Gressenhall is a village and civil parish in the English county of Norfolk, along the course of the River Nar.

Gressenhall is located 2.9 miles (4.7 km) north-west of Dereham and 18 miles (29 km) north-west of Norwich.

== History ==
Gressenhall's name is of Anglo-Saxon origin and derives from the Old English for the grassy or gravelly nook of land.

A watermill is recorded in Gressenhall on the River Whitewater as far back as 1060, with the earliest owner listed as Toke, the thane of Gressenhall. The mill was destroyed by fire in 1914. A smock mill also stood in Gressenhall between 1829 and 1970.

In the Domesday Book of 1086, Gressenhall is listed as a settlement of 27 households in the hundred of Laundich. In 1086, the village was part of the East Anglian estates of William de Warenne.

In 1777, a workhouse was built in Gressenhall to give a strict regime of work to paupers in exchange for food and shelter. The building was altered in 1834 to comply with the Poor Law Amendment Act and is still open as the Gressenhall Farm and Workhouse Museum.

Gressenhall House was built in the 18th century and was eventually demolished in 1948.

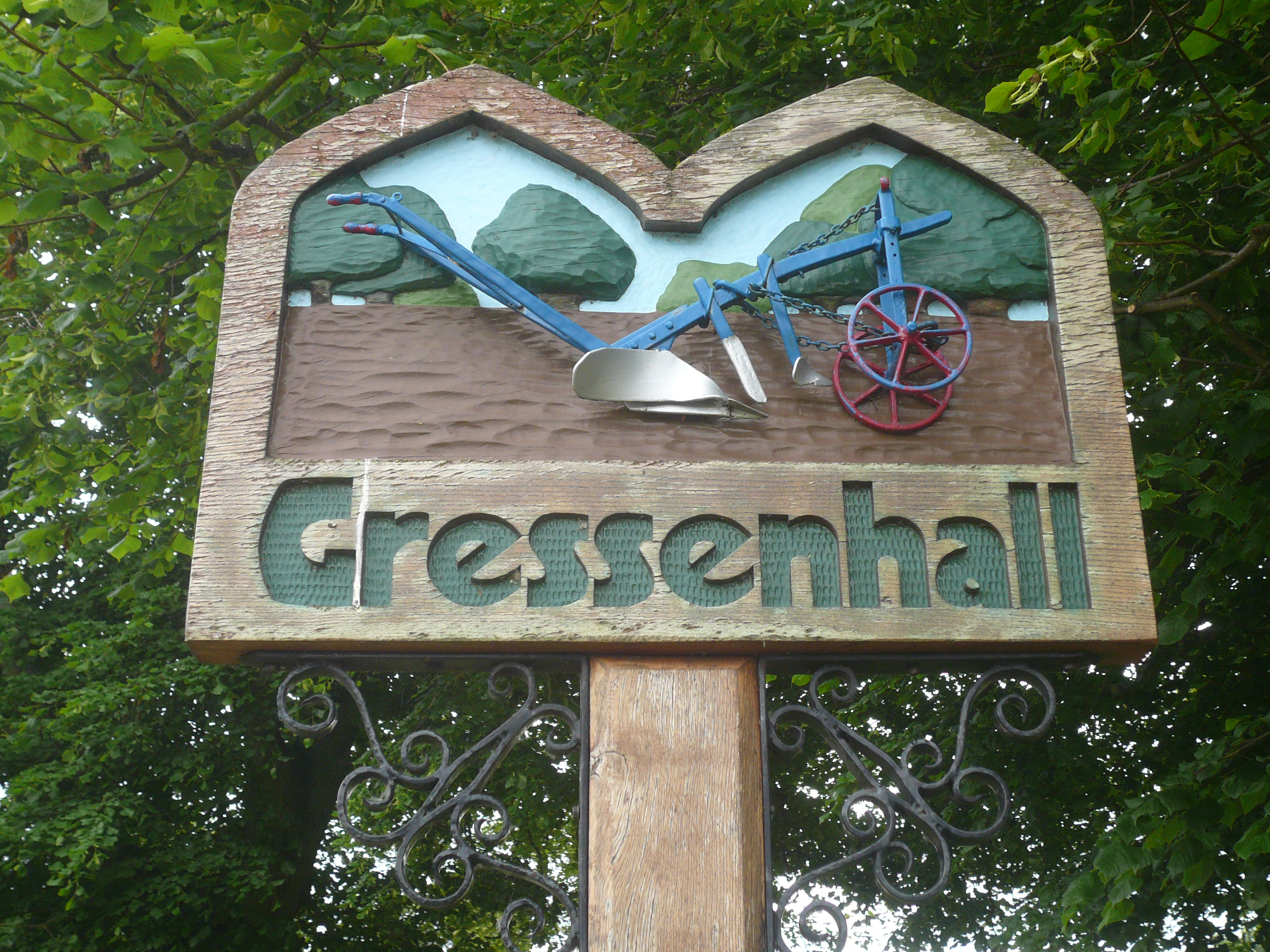
Gressenhall village sign, showing a plough

== Geography ==
According to the 2021 census, Gressenhall has a population of 1,032 people which shows a decrease from the 1,050 people recorded in the 2011 census.

The River Nar and the B1146, between Fakenham and Dereham, run through the parish.

== St Mary's Church ==
Gressenhall's parish church is dedicated to Saint Mary and dates from the 14th century. St Mary's is located outside of the village on Barn Lane and has been Grade I listed since 1960. The church holds Sunday services twice a month.

St Mary's was heavily restored in the Edwardian era but still retains its medieval rood screen and 15th century font.

== Amenities ==
The White Swan Pub has stood in the village since at-least 1688 and was popular with United States Air Force servicemen during the Second World War. The pub remains open.

== Notable residents ==
- Thomas Camoys KG, Baron Camoys (1351-1421) - peer and commander at the Battle of Agincourt, born in Gressenhall.
- Ralph Agas (1540-1621) - surveyor and cartographer, Rector of Gressenhall, 1578-1583.
- Sir Jerome Alexander (1585-1670) - barrister, judge and politician, born in Gressenhall.
- Alsager Hay Hill (1839-1906) - social reformer, born in Gressenhall Hall.
- William Gillis MP (1859-1929) - Labour Party politician, grew-up in Gressenhall.

== Governance ==
Gressenhall is part of the electoral ward of Lincoln for local elections and is part of the district of Breckland.

The village's national constituency is Mid Norfolk which has been represented by the Conservative's George Freeman MP since 2010.

== War Memorial ==
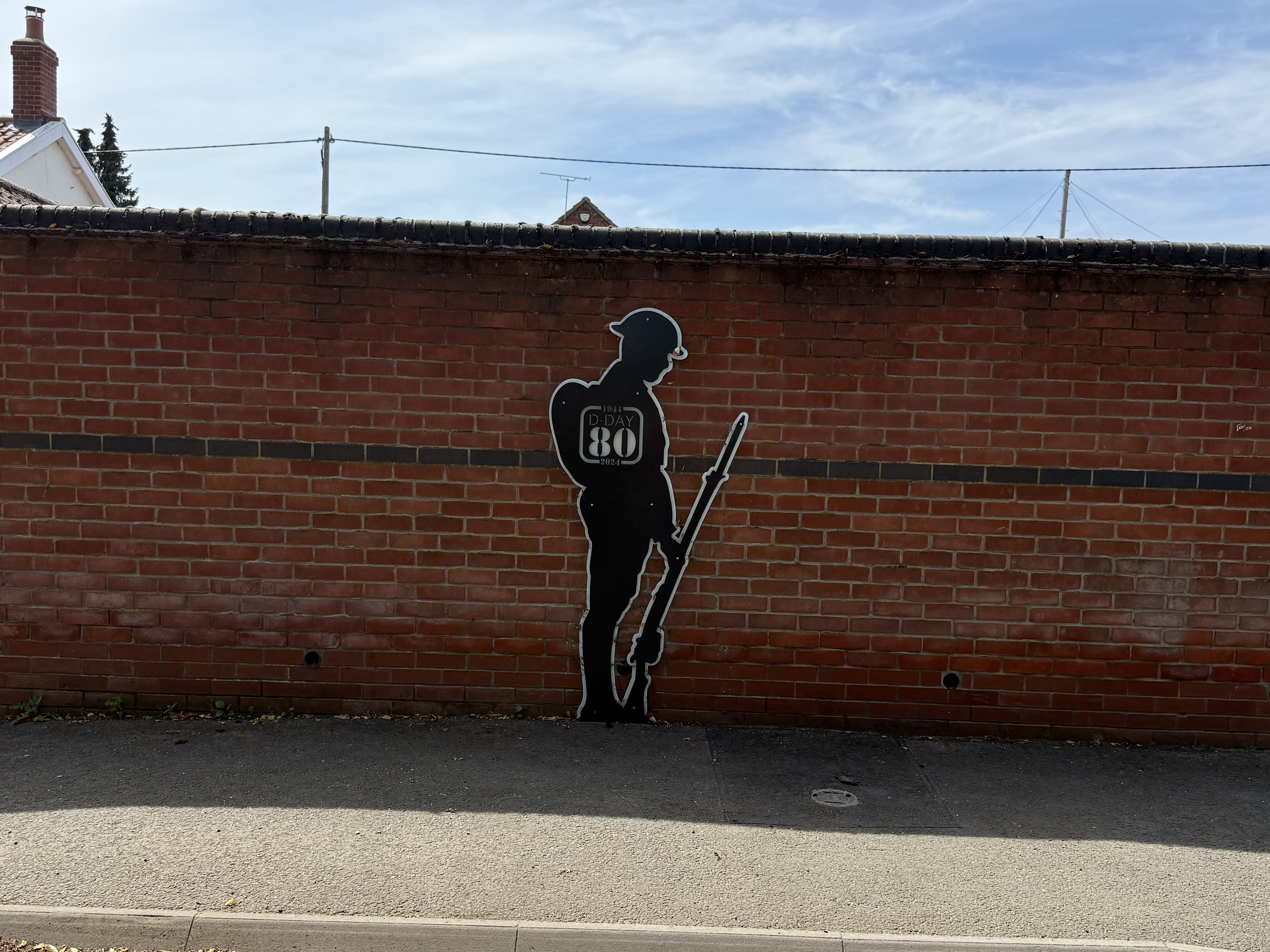
Memorial commemorating D-Day on Bridge Street

Gressenhall War Memorial is a marble plaque inside St Mary's Church which lists the following names for the First World War:

Rank	Name	Unit	Date of death	Burial/Commemoration
Sgt.	Cornelius A. P. Swann	373rd M.T. Coy., Army Service Cs	13 Apr. 1917	Norwich Cemetery
Sgt.	Ernest W. Freezer	11th Bn., Lancashire Fusiliers	10 Apr. 1918	Croix-du-Bac Cemetery
LCpl.	Ernest F. Burton	8th Bn., Norfolk Regiment	30 Oct. 1917	Boulogne Eastern Cemetery
Pte.	Ernest F. Reynolds	9th Bn., East Surrey Regiment	24 Dec. 1916	Chocques Cemetery
Pte.	William Hewitt MM	2nd Bn., Leinster Regiment	4 Sep. 1918	Messines Ridge Cemetery
Pte.	Ernest A. Abel	5th Bn., Norfolk Regiment	28 May 1917	Haifa War Cemetery
Pte.	Arthur J. W. Crown	5th Bn., Norfolk Regt.	18 Nov. 1918	Beirut War Cemetery
Pte.	Ernest J. Freezer	5th Bn., Norfolk Regt.	19 Apr. 1917	Jerusalem Memorial
Pte.	Albert E. Curtis	7th Bn., Norfolk Regt.	20 Jul. 1917	Monchy-le-Preux Cemetery

The following name was added after the Second World War:

Rank	Name	Unit	Date of death	Burial/Commemoration
Gnr.	Herbert C. Smith	110 H.A.A. Regt., Royal Artillery	22 Nov. 1940	St. Mary's Churchyard
