= The Tolhouse =

12th-century building in Great Yarmouth, Norfolk, England

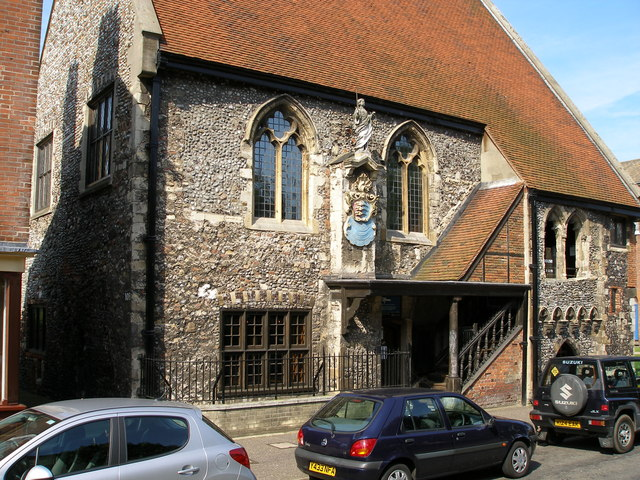
- The Tolhouse, Great Yarmouth in 2007.
- Interactive map of the The Tolhouse area

General information
- Location: Great Yarmouth, England
- Coordinates: 52.604°N 1.728°E
- Construction started: c. 1150

The Tolhouse (also the Tolhouse Gaol) is a 12th-century building in Great Yarmouth, Norfolk, England. The building has been used as a jail and a courthouse and is currently a museum. The Tolhouse is a Grade I listed building.

== History ==
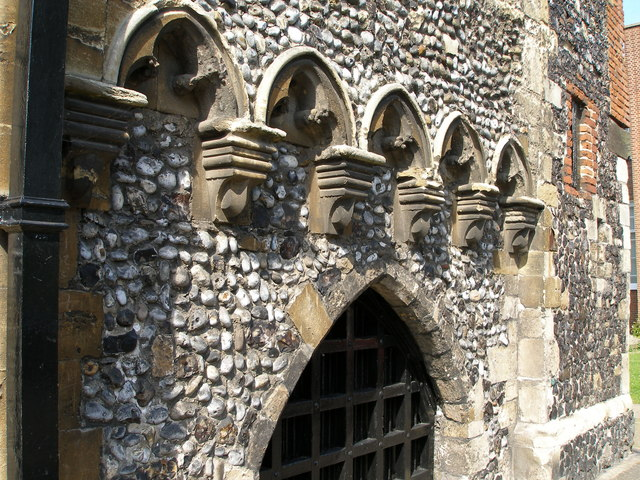
The Tolhouse is built of flint and ashlar.

The Tolhouse was built around 1150, and is believed to have been built by merchants. It is the oldest civic building in Great Yarmouth and one of the oldest remaining buildings in the town. The house is built of flint and ashlar with a tiled roof. The hall of The Tolhouse measures around 45 by 27 feet (14 by 8 m).

From the 13th century, it was used as a toll house for herring catches from the quay and is believed to have first been called The Tolhouse in 1360. In 1261, King Henry III gave permission for the Tolhouse to be used as a jail (gaol). The prison was in the basement of the building, and its main occupants of the jail were smugglers and pirates. In the 1400s, some inmates at the Tolhouse jail waited 10 years for a trial. In 1645, witch-hunter Matthew Hopkins used the Tolhouse jail during his witch trials, in which several local women were hanged. In the 18th century, the Tolhouse used hard labour, on a treadmill or picking oakum nearby. In the early 19th century, British prison visitor Sarah Martin criticised the living conditions in the jail, as the cells were too warm and the jail was unsanitary. She also objected to the fact that the inmates had no access to a church or chaplain. Until 1823, prisoners had to pay jail fees. In 1864, HM Inspectorate of Prisons criticised living conditions in the jail, as five people were sharing one room. They recommended that female prisoners be sent to Wymondham Bridewell, to allow for more space and better living conditions for the remaining prisoners. The underground cells stopped being used in 1836, and, later in the 19th century, the building's dungeons were used as storerooms.

The hall of the Tolhouse has also been used as a courthouse, and the building has also been used as a police station. The Tolhouse was bought by the local authority in 1552, following which significant repair work was undertaken. In 1648, The Tolhouse was used as a "council of war" room. The last council session at the building was in 1823.

In the 1870s, the Tolhouse was proposed for demolition. The Tolhouse jail was closed in 1878, and the prisoners were transferred to Norwich Prison. The building was then briefly used as a town hall. In 1883, The Tolhouse was given over to the mayor, and since then, the Tolhouse has been used as a museum. The building was bombed in 1941 during The Blitz and was restored between 1960 and 1961. In 1953, the Tolhouse became a Grade I listed building.
