= Strangers' Hall =

Museum and Grade I listed building in Norwich, UK

Coordinates: 52.6305°N 1.2922°E

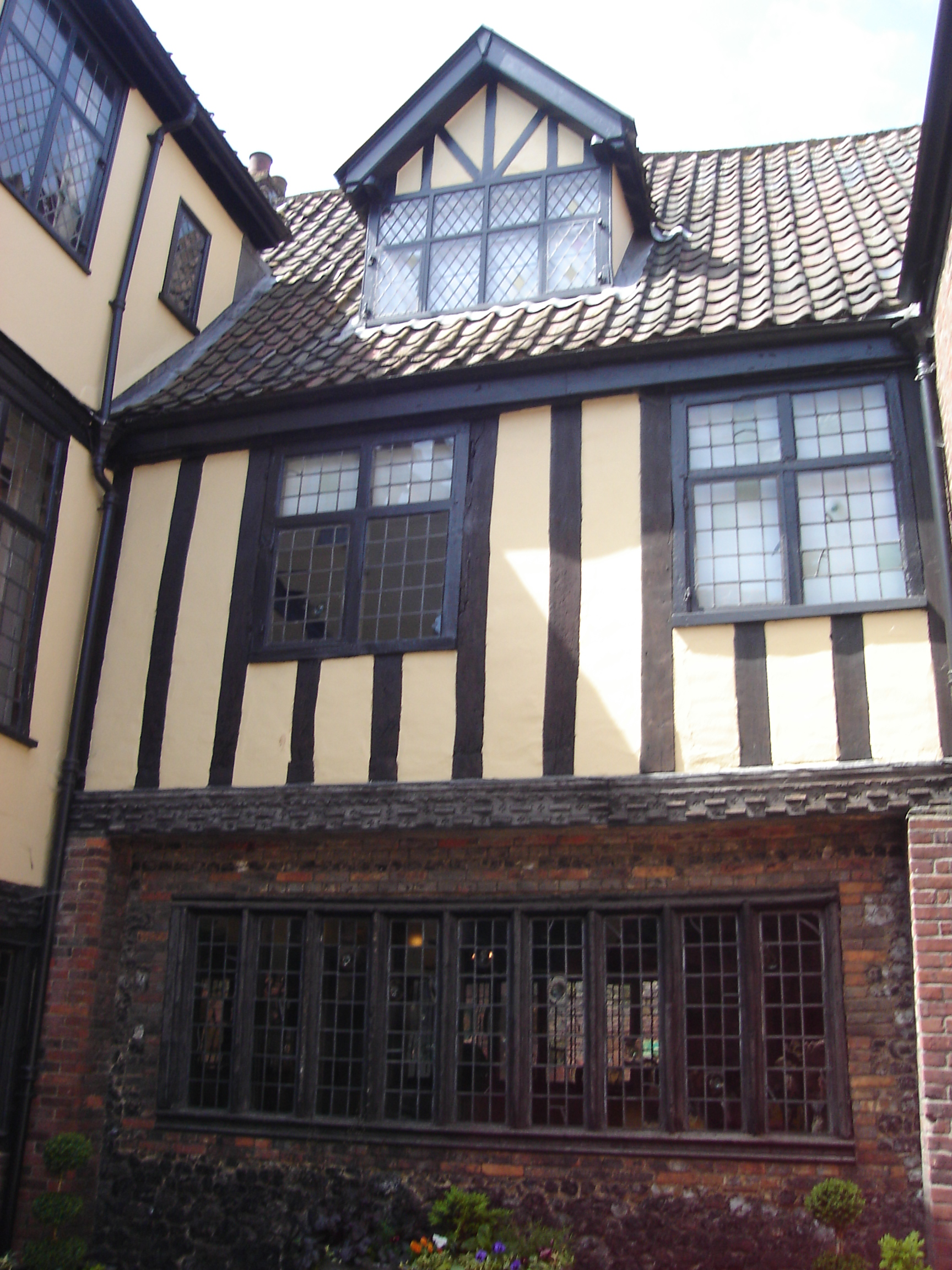
- Location: Norwich, UK
- Type: Domestic history museum
- Founder: Leonard Bolingbroke
- Curator: Cathy Terry
- Website: museums.norfolk.gov.uk/strangers-hall

Strangers' Hall is a Grade I listed building and museum of domestic history located in Norwich, UK. Throughout its 700-year history, Strangers' Hall has been the home to numerous Mayors of Norwich and has served both domestic and commercial functions.

A courtyard house, the oldest part of the building is the 14th-century undercroft while further additions were made through to the 17th century by various merchants and mayors, most notably the Sotherton family, Francis Cock and Joseph Paine. The house ended up in the hands of the Roman Catholic church before being bought by Leonard Bolingbroke, who converted it into a folk museum at the start of the 20th century. He then gave the house to the city of Norwich, which has since run it as a museum of domestic history. Although other theories have been proposed regarding the origins of the name of the house, it is named after the Strangers, a group of Protestant refugees seeking political asylum from the Catholic Low Countries from 1565, some of whom lived in the hall.

== Description and use ==
Strangers' Hall is located to the south of Charing Cross (originally Shearing Cross), Norwich on the south bank of the River Wensum in the parish of Saint John Maddermarket, an area that was historically central to the city's cloth industry. The building is a courtyard house, with the oldest parts of the building dating back to the 14th century, although additions were made from the structure until the 17th century. Strangers' Hall has been well preserved, with several centuries of construction surviving to the 21st century. The building contains two floors, with an east, west, south-east, and south-west range, which all span both floors. The south-west range contains a Georgian dining room on the ground floor and the Oak Room above. A north range with accompanying cellars and an undercroft fronts the building. There are three courtyards; one to the south, one in the centre, and one to the west. The hall is on the first floor, above the undercroft and adjacent to the north chamber block. A 17th-century staircase leads from the hall down to the south courtyard. To the east, there is a service range on the ground floor with a chamber block located above. There is a squint located on the ground floor, which allows a view of the entrance from a porter's lodge.

Strangers' Hall occupied both a domestic and commercial function, with various parts of the building suited to different uses. The undercroft was "presumably" a space for the storage and display of goods. The central courtyard, which was used as the entrance into the building, led into the undercroft and the porter's lodge allowed the regulation of goods and people into the area. The west courtyard allowed for the loading of goods to and from the south-west range and into cellars below.

=== Name ===
Strangers' Hall is named for the Strangers, a group of Protestant refugees from the Low Countries who settled in Norwich in the 16th century. Thomas Sotherton, mayor in 1565, obtained a royal license for 24 Dutch and 6 Walloon families to move to Norwich to boost the textile industry with the introduction of new methods and goods. The Strangers were also motivated to emigrate due to the anti-Protestant policies of Philip II of Spain, which resulted in between 50,000 and 300,000 refugees leaving the Low Countries. Sotherton allowed some of these Strangers to live in Strangers' Hall. Within two years, the number of Strangers in Norwich had reached 1,471, two years later there were 2,866, and in 1582 there were 4,678, roughly a third of the city's population. Leonard Bolingbroke suggested that the term "Strangers" does not refer to these immigrants, but instead to the fact that the hall was used as the residence of various visitors to the city in the 18th and 19th centuries. Another theory was that the hall was named after Sir Lestrange Mordaunt, 1st Baronet, owner in 1610.

== History ==
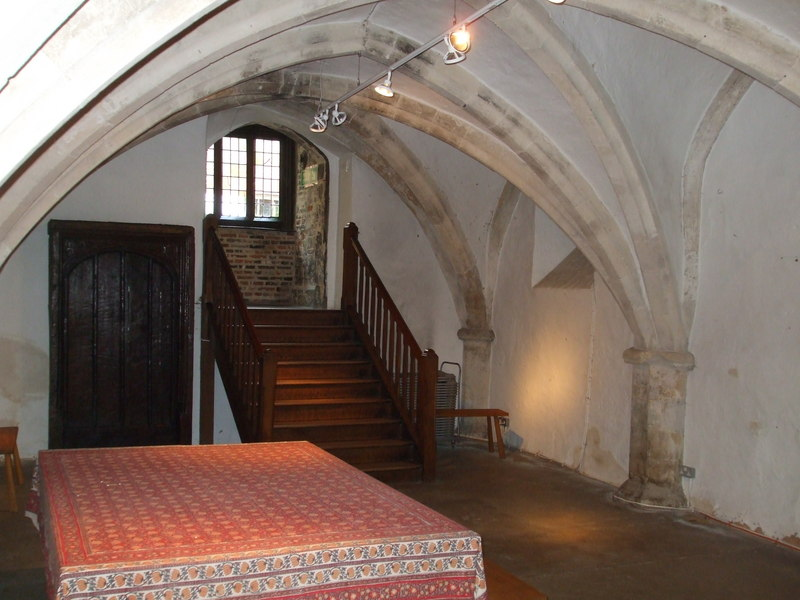
Strangers' Hall's undercroft, dating to around 1320

The first structure on the site of Strangers' Hall was built in the 14th century. The site was purchased by the merchant Ralph de Middleton in 1286–87, and it was "probably" him or his descendants who constructed the original structure. The structure likely contained domestic accommodation with an undercroft, dating to around 1320 located beneath. The three-bayed undercroft, which has chamfered ribs supported by wall piers, along with quoins in one of the courtyards, still exist.

The 15th century saw the building "substantially remodelled" under the ownership of mercer and alderman William Barley and, from 1485, under mercer and Mayor of Norwich Thomas Caus. Cellars were built to the east of the undercroft. A door was cut into the north side of the undercroft giving access to the central courtyard. The east range, built in the late 14th or early 15th century was also incorporated into the house. The hall was constructed above the undercroft and cellars and was 10.3 metres (34 ft) long and 6 metres (20 ft) wide, with the walls built of flint-rubble. The two-storey north chamber block, built of brick with stone quoins, was attached to the hall via a passage. The service rooms to the east were present, although the service doorways were a later addition, so it is not certain whether these were part of the building. The south-west range was also built in the 15th century and was connected to the hall by a newel staircase. The staircase was later replaced in the Georgian era. To the north, the range which now faces Charing Cross was constructed along with an undercroft underneath the west of the range and cellars to the east. The building during this time had a commercial purpose, with loading bays on the ground floor and storage areas above. The north range may have been divided and leased separately from the house.

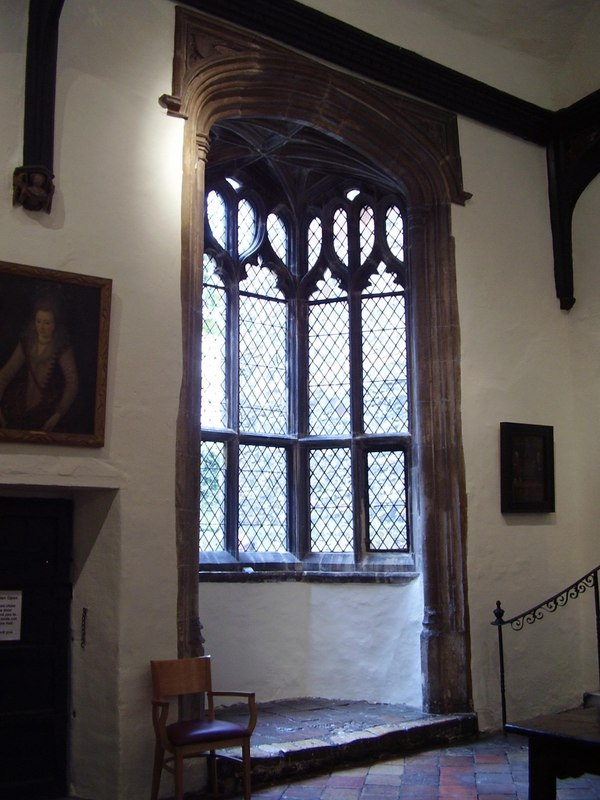
The 16th-century bay window on the south side of the main hall

Nicholas Sotherton, grocer and alderman and later Mayor of Norwich, bought the hall in the early 16th century. During his mayorship, which began in 1539, construction took place on the building, especially on the hall and chamber block. Two service doors were added to the east wall of the hall, connecting to the service rooms. The service rooms were connected by an archway and the north service room had a staircase down to the cellars. A three-sided bay window was built into the south wall of the hall. The bay is decorated with shield spandrels and an internal arch with capitals. The addition of this window coincided with the dissolution of the monasteries, and so historian Chris King posits that the window was likely taken from a monastic house. The south wall was heightened to support a new roof, comprising tie-beams and shield spandrels decorated with Sotherton's merchant's mark and Saint George's Cross. Arch-braces are supported by corbels on the walls. The north wall was also heightened and a new window overlooking the central courtyard was inserted. The chamber block was extended and a bressumer was incorporated into the structure while a fireplace was inserted. New stairs were built leading from the central courtyard into the hall via a new stone porch and porter's lodge, whose squint overlooked the entrance.

Sotherton also oversaw changes in other areas of the building. Walls in the south-west range were rebuilt in flint and brick rubble and the west range was constructed. The function of the range is unknown, despite its presentation as a kitchen in the modern museum. The west range contains a fireplace above which a lintel, containing Sotherton's merchant's mark and the Grocers' arms, sits. Following his death in 1540, the remodelling of the house was completed by Sotherton's wife, Agnes. Following her death in 1576, the house was occupied by their son John. Another of their sons was Thomas Sotherton who was mayor in 1565 and both John and Thomas were married to daughters of politician Augustine Steward. John's son John later came into the possession of Strangers' Hall while his older brother Thomas II became mayor in 1605.

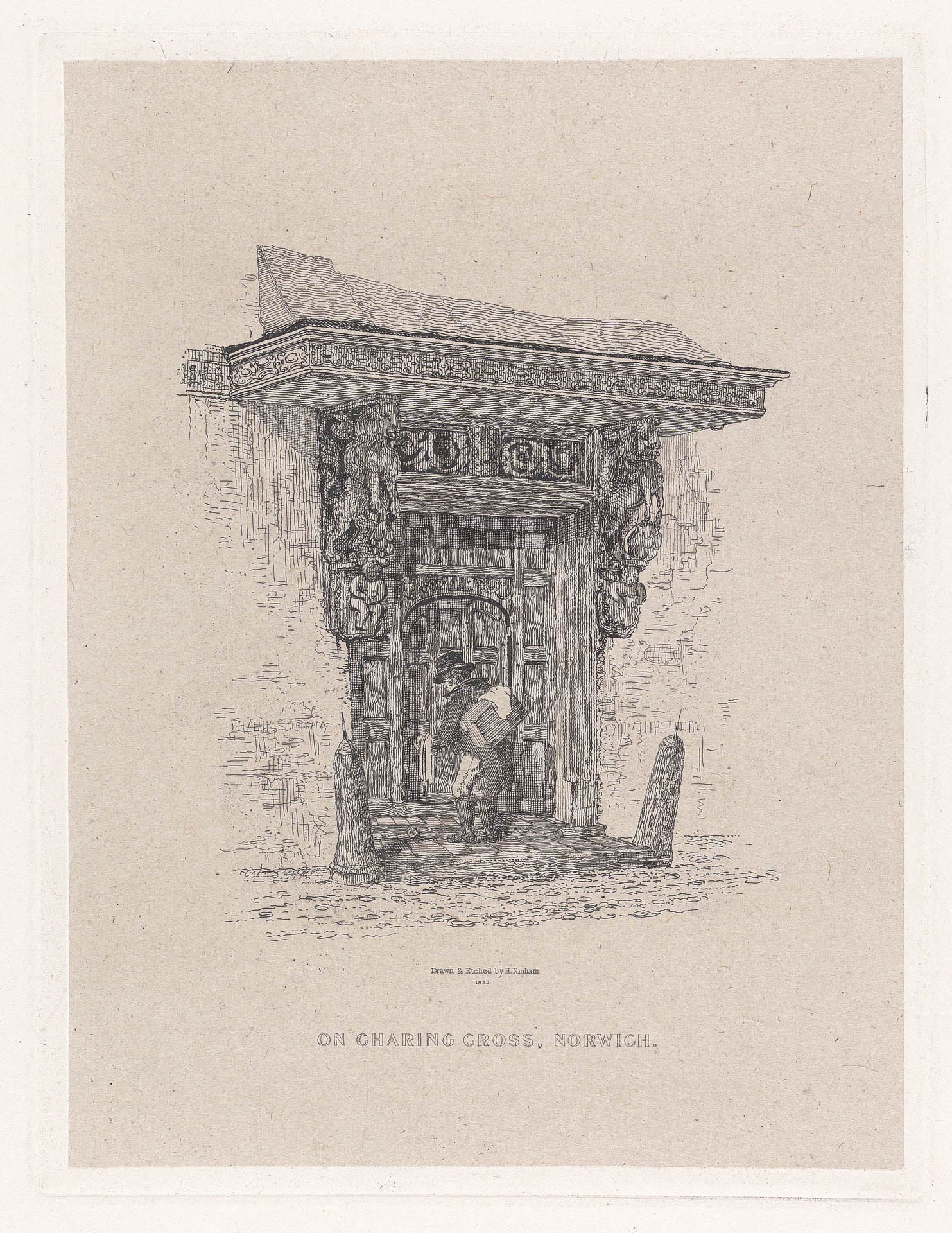
The portal on the north face (by Henry Ninham,1842)

Following Nicholas' death, the period of ownership under the Sotherton family saw no "substantial modifications" to the commercial areas of the building. A new brick range was built in the south-east corner; this contained a parlour on the ground floor and chamber on the first, with mullion and transom windows overlooking the south courtyard,. The south-west range was also extended. The house came into the possession of Sir Lestrange Mordaunt, 1st Baronet (who was married to Thomas Sotherton II's widow Frances) in 1610 and was sold in 1612 to grocer Francis Cock, who became mayor in 1627. In 1621, when remodelling the north range facing the street, he incorporated a fascia and new portal to the central courtyard, with an accompanying canopy with brackets depicting a lion and unicorn over a jettied first floor. In 1627, a staircase was placed in the east end of the hall leading up to a minstrel's gallery overlooking the hall. A bay protruding from the south wall was built to accommodate the staircase and doors leading to rooms on the east side were added to the gallery. A new staircase was also added between the two floors of the north chamber block. A year later, Cock died and the house passed to his wife, Sarah and then to Charles George Cock in 1646.

The building was bought by hosier Sir Joseph Paine in 1659, who became mayor in 1660. Both Paine and Cock hold potential relationship to American Founding Father Thomas Paine. Under Paine, the south-west range had three tall windows installed in each room. He created the Oak Room by installing oak panelling and an overmantel which encloses a painting of the city as viewed from Mousehold Heath. Paine lived in the house until 1667 and died in 1673, having received a knighthood for his support of Charles II following the Restoration.

The next 150 years of history for Strangers' Hall has been described as a "considerable mystery", and King has noted that in the later 17th century, the house's status declined and it was divided into several tenements. The central part of the house was used as a lodging for the assize judges in 1748, while a panelled dining room was built in its 16th-century parlour. Starling Day was in possession of the house in the 1830s, with the Day family having potentially owned it since 1731. A tenement came into the possession of the Roman Catholic church, whose priests constructed a chapel in the rear yard by St John's Alley; this is now the Maddermarket Theatre. The house contained the studio of Italian sculptor Pellegrino Mazotti in 1819 and Norman priest Thomas de Eterville, language teacher of George Borrow, tenanted the house. In 1846, a meeting was held to consider its demolition, which was ultimately rejected.

=== As a museum ===
By the 1890s, the building was empty and derelict and in 1896, was put up for auction by the Catholics in a lot with the nearby chapel and school, and sold for a price of £3,250, despite a suggestion that it should come under the care of the Norfolk and Norwich Archaeological Society. Leonard Bolingbroke, solicitor and grandson of Norwich painter James Stark, bought Strangers' Hall in 1899 for £1,050 to save it from demolition. He moved his collection of antiques and topographical prints into the house and opened it as a public folk museum on 1 May 1900. The house underwent repairs from builder C. F. Harrison and Bolingbroke wished to preserve the house for its historical significance, citing other merchant's houses which had been destroyed in the city. In May 1904, the Norwich Corporation Officials' Bowling Club opened a bowling green to the rear of the hall.

In 1909, the hall was visited by a correspondent from The Times-Democrat based in New Orleans, Louisiana, United States, who wrote the following:

Passing from the street through a handsome doorway, we find ourselves in a small courtyard. Immediately opposite is a stately porch, and when, in answer to our ring, the massive oaken door is opened, we find ourselves in the Banqueting Hall a charming apartment with a "king-post" open roof and two beautiful deep bay windows through which we look on to a quiet bowling green. Across one end is the musicians' gallery, reached by an exquisitely carven staircase, bearing the date 1627. Everything is so appropriate, so harmonious, that we feel as if we have somehow walked into some old picture, and it is with a sensation of being in a delicious dream that we pass into another apartment equally fascinating, prevaded in like manner with the atmosphere of long ago.

In 1914, a replica of the hall featured at the Anglo-American Exposition in White City, Shepherd's Bush. Bolingbroke offered the museum, hall and stock to the city of Norwich and it was officially opened by the city in July 1923. The opening ceremony was attended by the likes of H. Rider Haggard, Eustace Gurney, and George Henry Morse. On 26 February 1954, the museum became a Grade I listed building.

The building is particularly vulnerable to pests such as woodworm and damp, and is thus subject to annual deep cleans by workers and volunteers. In January 2023, during one deep clean of the premises, volunteers found charred remains of parish records dating back 250 years from St Bartholomew Church, a place of worship in the city which was bombed in 1942. The museum's assistant curator of social history, Bethan Holdridge, theorised that the documents may have been misplaced at Strangers' Hall in 1994, following the fire at Norwich Central Library that year. Extensive woodworm was found in March 2023, and several pieces of antique furniture were moved to Gressenhall Farm and Workhouse for freezing, which eradicates the larvae.

== See also ==
- Museum of Norwich at the Bridewell
- Norwich Castle

== Bibliography ==
- Ayers, Brian (1994). Norwich: 'A Fine City'. Tempus Publishing.
- Conway, Moncure Daniel (1892). The Life of Thomas Paine. G.P. Putnam's Sons.
- Jenkins, Herbert George (1912). The Life of George Borrow. John Murray.
- King, Chris (2022). "Houses and Society in Norwich, 1350-1660: Urban Buildings in an Age of Transition". Cultural and Social History. 19. Boydell Press: 104–106. doi:10.1080/14780038.2021.2002531. S2CID 247500173.
- Pevsner, Nikolaus; Wilson, Bill (2002). The Buildings of England: Norfolk 1: Norwich and North-East. Yale University Press.
