= Gressenhall Farm and Workhouse =

Norfolk museum and former workhouse

Coordinates: 52°42′54″N 0°55′17″E

Gressenhall Farm and Workhouse is a museum of rural life and former workhouse in the village of Gressenhall, Norfolk. It also houses a traditional working farm, a collection of art and artefacts, and a library and archive.

== History ==
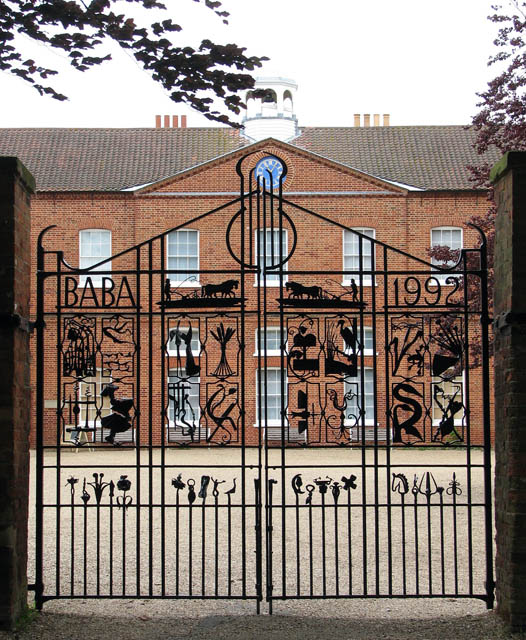

The Mitford and Launditch Hundreds Incorporation was established in 1775, with the land on which a "house of industry" would be built being purchased the following year. The Mitford and Launditch Corporation House of Industry was opened on 7 July 1777. The building accommodated an average of 450 "inmates", but at its peak in 1801 housed 670.

In 1834, the Poor Law Amendment Act led to the creation of the Mitford and Launditch Poor Law Union. The conversion of the House of Industry to Union Workhouse began in 1836.

Inhabitants of the workhouse who have been remembered include Harriet Kettle, who was sentenced to 18 months in prison with hard labour for setting a fire in the building, and Elizabeth Rudd, "a pauper inmate of the workhouse", who became pregnant while there.

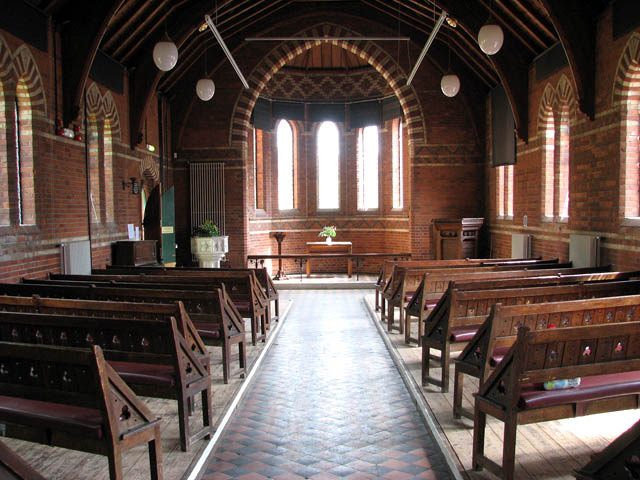
The workhouse chapel, built 1868

The chapel was, designed by R. M. Pinson and opened by the Bishop of Norwich, was built in 1868.

In 1930, the workhouse became Gressenhall Institution, and after World War II provided accommodation for elderly people, and occasionally as emergency housing for homeless families. In 1976, it became a rural life museum.

== Notable people ==
- Helen Hart (suffragist)
- Harriet Kettle

== Museum ==
In 2011, Gressenhall became the first accredited museum to have a gallery dedicated to Land Girls and the wartime role they played. As well as photographs, uniforms, and tools, the exhibition featured audio recordings by former members of the Land Army and Timber Corps.

In 2024, an exhibition called "Making the Rounds" used textile works to explore the story of workhouse nurses. One of the women whose story was uncovered by volunteers conducting research for the project was Helen Hart, a British-born suffragist, lecturer, nurse, and journalist, who became well-known in Australia.

The art collection includes works by artists such as Perry Nursey (1799–1867), J. Locke (active 1870–1900), and James Scraggs (active 1816–1831).
