= Time and Tide Museum =

Coordinates: 52.6017°N 1.7317°E

Time and Tide Museum of Great Yarmouth Life
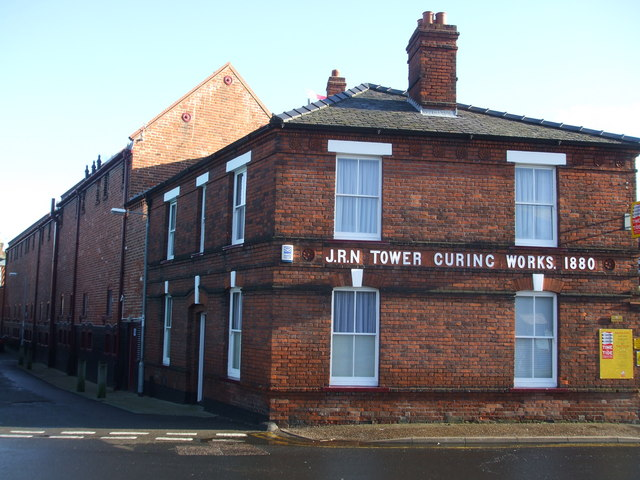
- Former name: Tower Curing Works
- Established: 2005
- Location: Great Yarmouth, Norfolk, UK
- Type: Maritime museum
- Website: www.museums.norfolk.gov.uk/time-tide

Time and Tide: The Museum of Great Yarmouth Life, located in Great Yarmouth, Norfolk, UK, is a maritime and fishing museum in Great Yarmouth and established in 2005. It is situated in a former Victorian herring curing factory known as Tower Curing Works, and is now part of Maritime Heritage East, a partnership of over 30 maritime museums in the East of England.

== History ==
The curing works was closed down in the mid-1980s, and the building lay unused for almost 20 years.

Over £4.5 million was spent on refurbishing and converting the Grade II listed factory into the modern museum about the building's life as a fish factory, which opened in 2005. It took on exhibits from Great Yarmouth's former Maritime Museum, which had closed in 2002.

In 2019, the museum set up a British Tattoo Art Revealed exhibition, which features over 400 items concerning tattoos in Britain. A town-wide exhibition of works from Peter Henry Emerson was partially on display at the Museum in 2021. A Banksy mural from Gorleston-on-Sea, which had appeared following the death of a girl in 2018 and was covered up due to "sensitivity," was moved to the museum temporarily in 2022.

== Awards ==
- Gulbenkian Prize Museum of the Year finalist 2005
- European Museum of the Year finalist 2006
- Objective 2 Celebrate Award Winner (Tourism Category) 2006
- Eastern Daily Press Design & Development Award Winner 2006
