= Earlham =

Earlham can refer to the following places:

- Earlham, Norfolk, England
  - Earlham Hall, a historic house in Norfolk, England
  - Earlham Road, Norwich, England
- Earlham, Iowa, United States
- Earlham College, a liberal arts college in Richmond, Indiana, United States
- Earlham Institute, a research institute in genomics and bioinformatics in Norfolk, England
- Earlham Cemetery, a historic cemetery adjacent to Earlham College in Richmond, Indiana, United States
