= Norwich City Gaol =

Former prison in Norwich, England

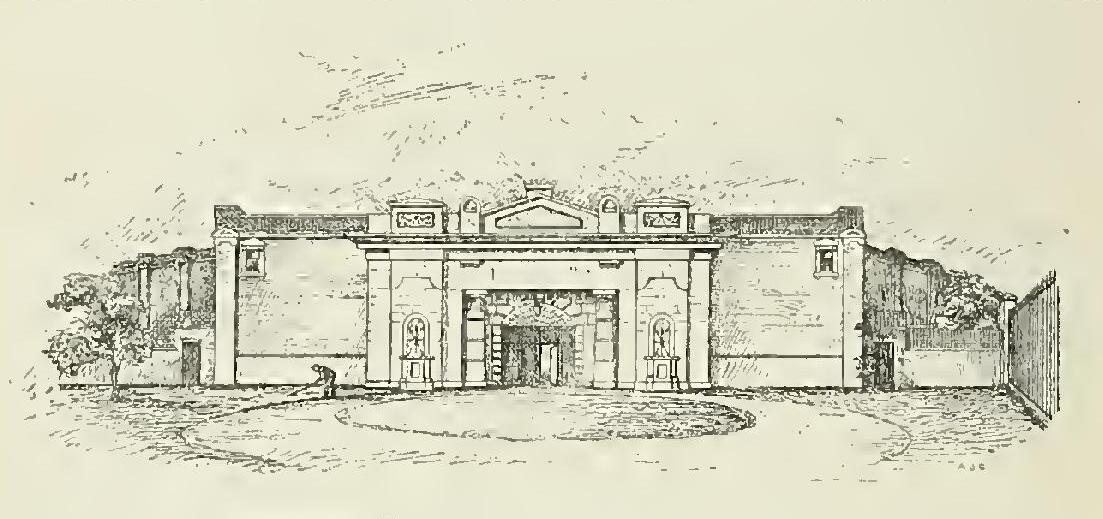
A drawing of the front of Norwich City Gaol which existed in Heigham, Norwich

Norwich City Gaol was a prison in Norwich, England, present in its city centre from the late 16th century to the late 19th century, and then on a larger site from then until its closure in 1878. It was initially located opposite Norwich Guildhall from 1596 until a new gaol was built outside the site of St Giles' Gate in Norwich's Heigham hamlet in the 1820s. The latter site saw two executions, one being public and one private. It closed in May 1878 and its prisoners were moved to Norwich Castle county gaol, after which it was demolished to make way for St John the Baptist Cathedral, located in the corner of Earlham Road and Unthank Road.

== History ==
The Common Gaol of the City of Norwich was first located in the cellars of the Guildhall from 1412 until 1597.

=== In the former Lamb Inn ===
From 1597, Norwich City Gaol (TG229085) was situated on a plot of land north of Norwich Market, which extended from St. Giles Street north to Pottergate, between Lower Goat Lane and Dove Street. This was the former building of the Lamb Inn. It was operational from 1596, opposite Norwich Guildhall. Imprisonment in the Common Gaol often amounted to a death sentence, and many deaths from disease occurred there; from January to December 1689, 13 inquests were heard on prisoners who had died there, of which 11 were prisoners for debt, not criminals. Illnesses cited in included black jaundice, scurvy, dropsy, consumption and hectic fever.

The gaol was subject to a fire in 1746, and was rebuilt in 1749. An undated plan by W S Millard shows that it was a long and narrow site, featuring an entrance on St Giles Broad Street and an irregularly-shaped central yard. A large building was added to the gaol in 1794. In 1809, it was noted that the prison was to be enlarged.

In 1822, Norfolk civil engineer William Cubitt was asked by Elisha de Hague, clerk of the peace, to report on the state of the gaol and suggest ways in which it could be improved. Cubitt concluded that the gaol was inadequate and recommended rebuilding. Cubitt provided plans for a proposed new gaol and submitted a supporting report to the Committee of the Justices of Peace on 12 July 1822. Cubitt's plans were guided by the requirements of Acts of Parliament, but the Justices of Peace preferred plans submitted by local architect Philip Barnes in 1823, which went ahead.

=== Heigham Hamlet ===
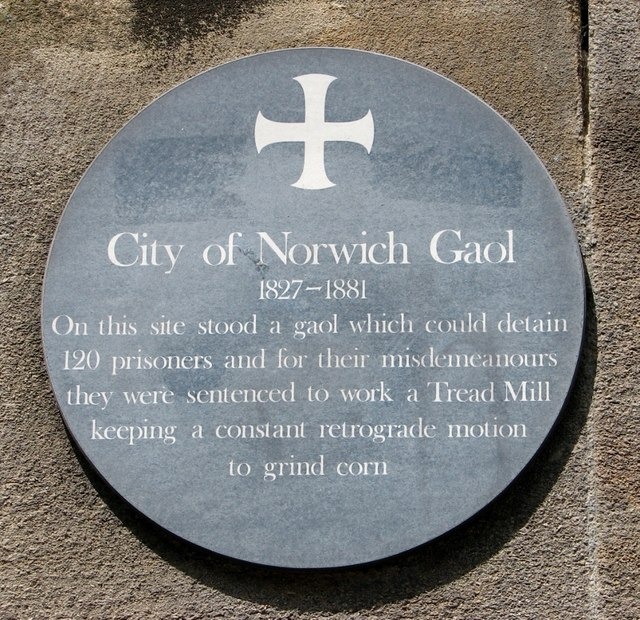
A plaque commemorating Norwich City Gaol, now the site of the Roman Catholic cathedral. Plaque #8149 on Open Plaques.

The gaol was rebuilt on a new site between 1824 and 1827 at the west end of St. Giles Street, outside the site of St. Giles Gate. Rather than Cubitt, it was designed by architect Mr Brown of Wells Street, Oxford Street, London with the plans of local architect Philip Barnes. It received its first prisoners from the old City Gaol on 7 August 1826 before being fully completed in 1827. It enclosed an area of just over an acre, costing £30,000 to build. Norwich City Gaol would be open alongside Norwich Castle gaol, the county gaol, for the course of its operation.

Only one public execution took place at Norwich City Gaol, which was that of John Stratford, known as 'The Norwich Dumpling Poisoner'. He was hanged there by William Calcraft on 17 August 1829, atop the prison lodge. Stratford himself, a whitesmith, had made the metalwork and fittings for the gallows upon which he was hanged. The execution was viewed by a crowd of thousands, which blocked Earlham Road from traffic, and premium viewing spaces from the tower of the nearby St Giles' Church were sold for £2 per person. The only other execution, which took place on 20 April 1869, was the private execution of William Sheward who was also executed by Calcraft. For Sheward's execution, the scaffold was erected on the extreme end of the south-east angle of the prison by Mr Foyson, who also supplied the 'drop' used for executions at Norwich Castle. Around 2,000 people waited at the prison gates for the black flag to be raised to signal the successful execution, Sheward being the first person to be executed behind closed doors in Norfolk and the last to be executed at the City Gaol. He was buried a short distance from the scaffold, and his initials were carved a stone and set in the prison wall by Mr Hibbert, the Chapel Field stonemason.

In 1838, the Norwich House of Correction, which was located on the same site as the gaol and shared the same senior management, officially merged with the gaol.

In May 1878, Norwich City Gaol was closed. Its prisoners were removed to the County Gaol at the castle. The site was sold off, and the prison was subsequently demolished; the Roman Catholic St John the Baptist Cathedral, was erected in its place from 1884 to 1910. The cathedral is now located by the corner of Earlham Road and Unthank Road.

==== Architecture ====
The Heigham hamlet gaol ran on the separate system, containing 120 cells and eight yards, which were divided into 14 airing yards. Six of these yards were sunk 3 feet (0.9 m) below the others, allowing the Governor to command a full view of the whole prison from the Governor's house inspecting gallery. This Governor's house was the centre of the prison, which also featured a chapel. There were three treadwheels throughout the complex.

The main gatehouse had a porter's room, press room, hot and cold baths, and a room with an oven for purifying linen. The upper story over the entrance gate had a drop room; above this, a scaffold could be erected on the lead flat of the roof for public executions.

From the Governor's house, four wings radiated, each of which contained two wards. From the main gate, the near wing on the left contained a ward for master debtors and another for debtors from the court of conscience, and the far wing on the left contained one ward for male misdemeanours and another for convicted male felons. On the right, the near wing held a ward for common debtors and another for men awaiting trial for non-capital offences, and the far wing contained a ward for unconvicted male felons and a ward for unconvicted female felons awaiting trial for capital offences. Each wing held two day rooms, four condemned cells and four solitary cells located in the back towers.

Two separate bastions, on either side of the prison, were also built. The left building contained a mill house with a mill chamber and a hayloft. The mill could be turned by a treadwheel to grind corn, though a large wind vane on the roof, connected to the treadwheel through a mechanism, could be engaged to give employment to prisoners when there was no corn to grind. It also held a stable and coach house for the Black Maria. The right bastion held a wash house and laundry on the ground floor, as well as separate male and female infirmaries above. Another treadwheel elsewhere was used to pump water into the cisterns of four water towers that ran into the various apartments.
