= The Layer Quaternity =

Four marble sculptures in the columns of the Layer Monument

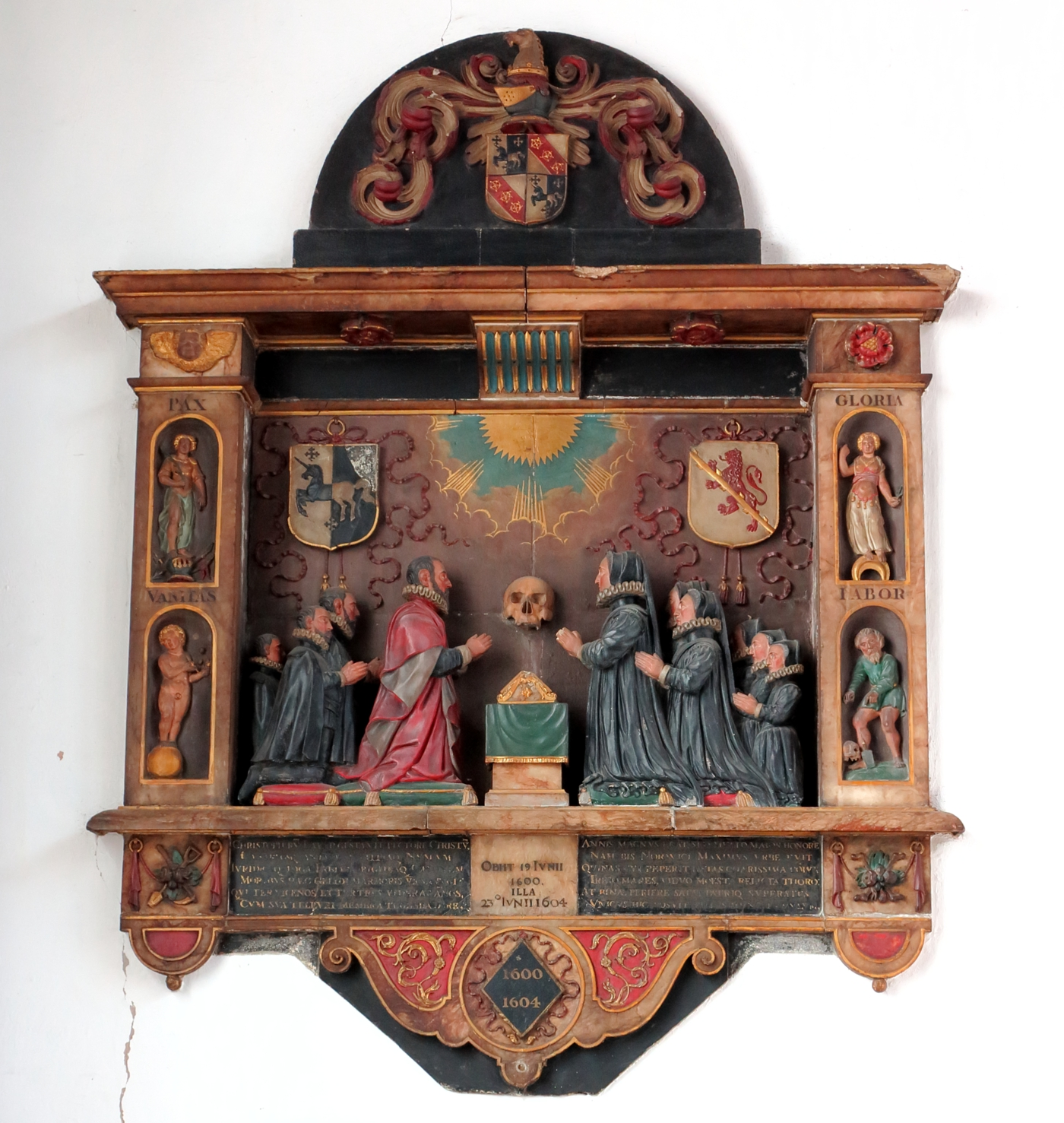
The Layer Monument with four Northern Mannerist figurines

The Layer Quaternity are four marble sculpture figurines approximately 25 centimetres (10 in) in height located on the two columns of the Layer Monument, an early 17th-century polychrome mural monument (320 by 350 centimetres [130 in × 140 in]) which was installed in the Church of Saint John the Baptist, Maddermarket, Norwich to the memory of Christopher Layer (1531–1600).

== Style ==
The quartet of figurines sculptured in marble, Pax, Gloria, Vanity, Labor exhibit primary thematic concerns and stylistic attributes of Northern Mannerist art, namely, portraiture of animated human movement, variety and multiplicity, often set in the Classical or mythological world, and inclined towards esoteric concepts.

== Sources of symbolism ==
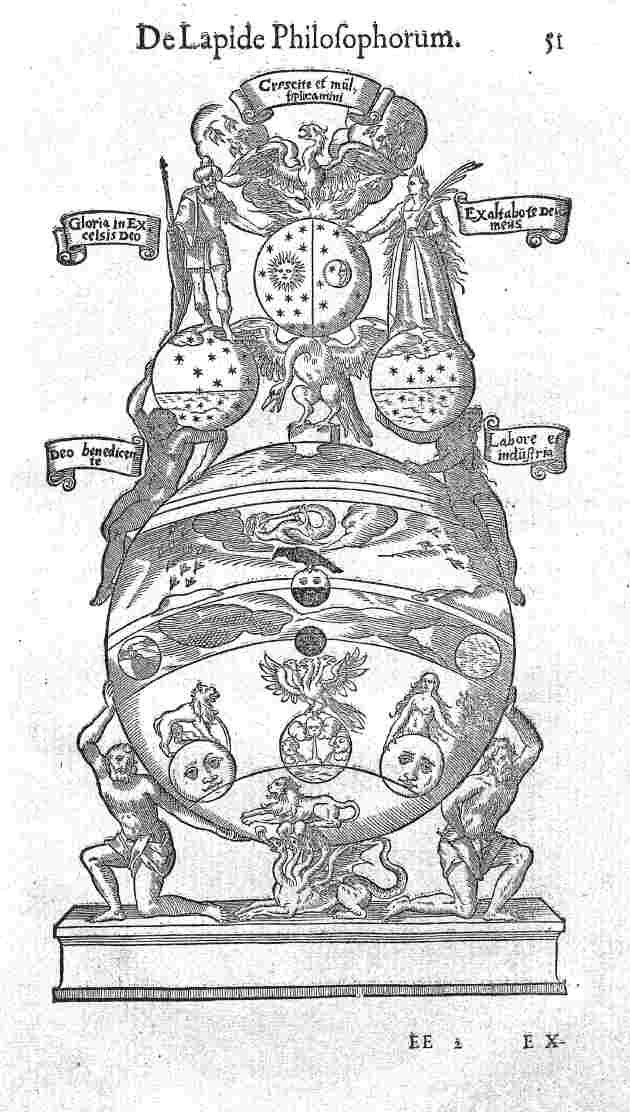
'The Philosopher's Stone' from 'Alchemia' (1606) Libavius

The Layer Quaternity (circa 1598–1604) share a number of iconographical details to a complex illustration found in Alchemia (1606) by the German academic Andreas Libavius in a chapter entitled De Lapide Philosophorum (The Philosopher's Stone) in which two giants support four figures, the lower pair of which are mortal, the upper pair immortal, they form the apex to –

"Libavius' monument of the opus.......The completion of the Little Work by Labor and Industry and the grace of God (Latin lower captions translated) is followed by Sol and Luna ascending on swan's wings.....the thanksgiving by the Arab king and his white wife reading as – Glory to God on High and I will exalt thee my God ". (Latin upper captions translated)

Libavius' illustration and the marble sculpture of the Layer Quaternity share an identical pairing including a naked figure (lower pair), a bare-legged royal male and a regal draped female (upper pair) as well as the titled captions Gloria and Labor, along with the symbols of palm branch, rotundum, and moon.

The similarities between the captioned phrases of Libavius' illustration to those of the single-word titles of the Layer Quaternity suggest that in time sequence, the Layer monument was based upon and installed before 1606, the publication date of Libavius' illustration.

Biblical verse which parallels the symbolism of each captioned entity includes for the lower and mortal pair – Then I looked on all the works that my hands had wrought, and on the Labour that I had laboured to do: and, behold, all was Vanity and vexation of spirit, and there was no profit under the sun. Ecclesiastes 2.v.11 With an antithetical response from the upper, immortal, Heavenly pair – Glory to God in the highest, and on earth Peace, goodwill to all men. Luke 2 v.14

The Layer Quaternity also corresponds to the alchemical 'deities' Apollo, Luna, Mercurius and Vulcan as named in emblem XVII of Atalanta Fugiens (1617) by the German alchemist-physician Michael Maier.

== Interpretation ==
The four figurines housed in the monument's pilasters, Pax and Gloria, Vanitas and Labor, (Peace, Glory, Vanity, Labor) are relatively rare examples of Northern Mannerist sculpture extant in Britain. Collectively they exemplify how Christian iconography during the era of Elizabeth I, in tandem with Renaissance Europe, integrated symbolism from the western esoteric traditions of alchemy and astrology into works of art, including the funerary monument. The Layer Quaternity in their totality are a unique alchemical mandala. Through polarised symbolism they delineate essential coordinates associated with mandala art, namely Space (Heaven and Earth) and Time (Young and Old). They also represent fundamental aspects of the human condition, namely, gender, youth and age, as well as pleasure and suffering. In essence, the Layer Quaternity, not unlike the Scaiolae of Paracelsus (which are discussed by Libavius in Alchemia) are a quaternity of differentiated virtues or psychic entities which represent a complete wholeness or totality in sum.

== Psychological associations ==
The role of the Quaternity in religious symbolism is discussed at length by Carl Gustav Jung. Much of his in-depth study and observations upon the function and role of the quaternity in religious symbolism is applicable to the Layer Quaternity. To Jung the quaternity was a natural expression of differentiation which always represents a totality, citing the four elements, the four seasons, the ancient Greek schemata of the four humours, and the four temperaments, as well as the four Evangelists with their respective emblems in the form of the tetramorph in Christian iconography, as examples.

The symbolism of the four entities of the Layer Quaternity exemplify Jung's observation that individuation develops through psychic qualities consisting of two pairs of opposites, which are often polarised to each other.

As such, the Layer Quaternity may be viewed as exemplary of Renaissance-era psychology. Its four highly-symbolic figurine entities are simultaneously, a 'map' of the psyche, and a highly-original alchemical mandala in western funerary art.

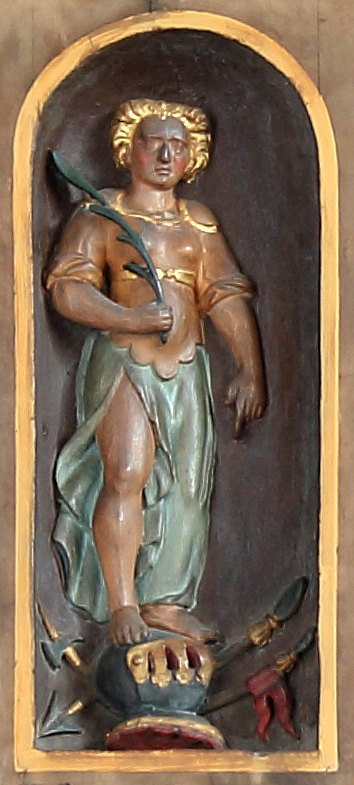
PAX

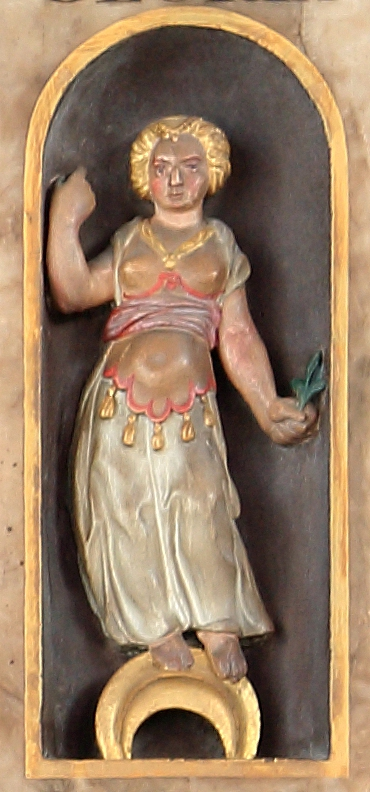
GLORIA

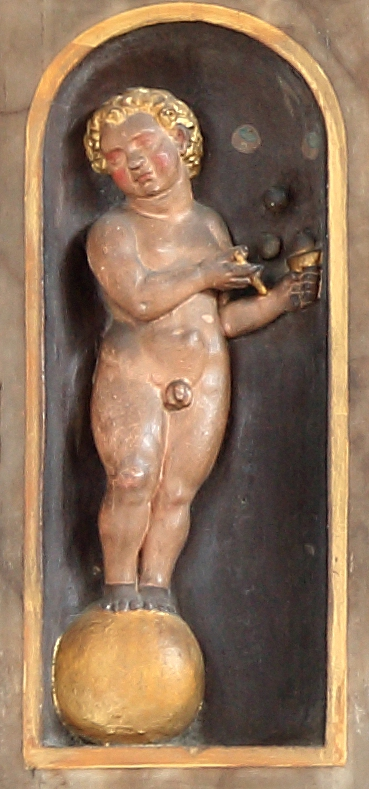
VANITAS

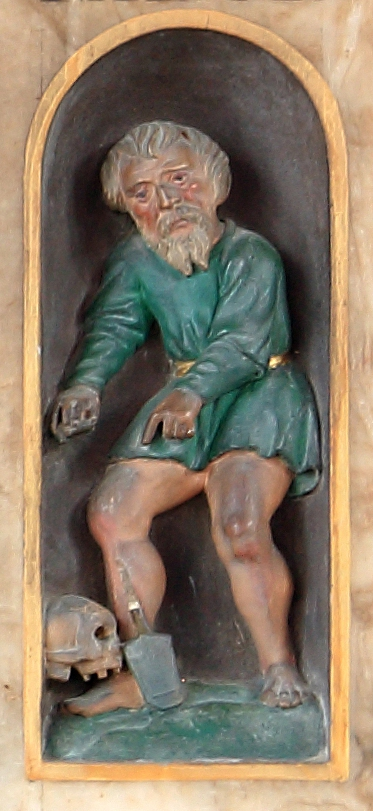
LABOR
