= Museum of Norwich at the Bridewell =

Museum and Grade I listed building in Norwich, England

Coordinates: 52.6301°N 1.2954°E

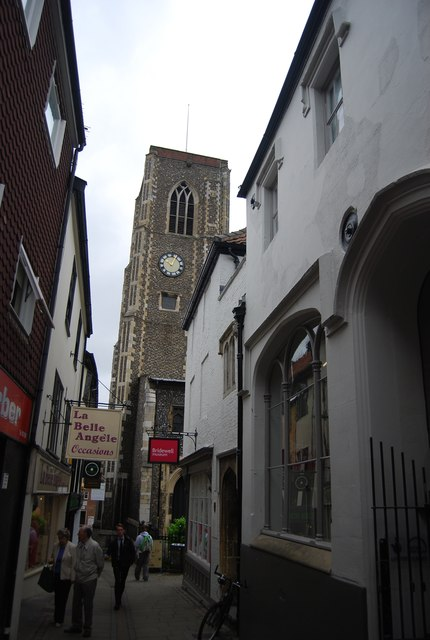
- Bridewell Alley in 2013, with the Museum of Norwich (right) and St Andrew's Church (background)
- Former name: The Bridewell; Bridewell Museum
- Location: Norwich, England
- Type: Social history museum
- Curators: Jenny Caynes; Bethan Holdridge
- Website: museums.norfolk.gov.uk/museum-of-norwich

The Museum of Norwich at the Bridewell (formerly the Bridewell Museum) is a Grade I listed building and museum of the social history of the city of Norwich, England, located next to St Andrew's Church. Constructed in the 14th century, it began as one of the grandest medieval residences in the city, particularly for William Appleyard, the first Mayor of Norwich. In 1585 it opened as a house of correction known as the Bridewell, was a factory from 1828, and became a museum after its donation to the city in 1923.

== History ==
The building was the home of the Appleyard family during the 14th and 15th centuries, including Bartholomew Appleyard and his son William. Both were city bailiffs and William was the first mayor of Norwich and served as burgess in parliament ten times.

=== 1585–1828: House of correction ===
The Norwich corporation led the modernisation of the system of relief in Elizabethan England in the late 16th century, and one of these reforms was to open a reformative institution for the poor. As a result, In 1584, the premises was purchased and converted into the city's house of correction. It opened in 1585, becoming one of the first reformative institutions in the country. Contemporaneously, it was known either as the Bridewell or simply the House of Correction.

The Bridewell had an initial stated purpose to encourage moral reformation, and was seen as a place for the feeding, housing, prayer instruction, and work-setting of poor vagrants before they were ordered to find their own work. However, in reality it served a mixture of goals including punishment, incarceration, and care for the poor, blurring distinctions between poverty and crime. It was in several respects a precursor to the workhouse, and a term there was often used as a threat by the mayor's court to punish wilful idleness despite it not being intended as a prison and operating separately from the City Gaol. Contemporaries saw the Bridewell as a place of punishment at least the 1630s. Whipping was the "usual correction" at the Bridewell, with six or twelve "stripes" being the norm. It had had "two whipinge postes", a "paire of stockes", and a "chaire for unruly persons".

One individual incarcerated here in the late 16th century was Margaret Utting, an elderly ex-prostitute suffering from syphilis, who was sent to the Bridewell instead of a hospital or poor house due to her perceived dubious morality. Utting remained at the Bridewell until her death. Barbara Bloy was whipped at the post at the Bridewell for "ill rule and michery", was reformed there for a short time, and three months later was returned to the Bridewell to be "sett on worke" after being whipped at the post again.

In 1751, the Bridewell was badly damaged in a fire, damaging mostly its ground and first floor.

=== 1828–present: Factory and museum ===
It was sold in 1828 following the construction of the prison at St Giles Gate, and the building then became a factory.

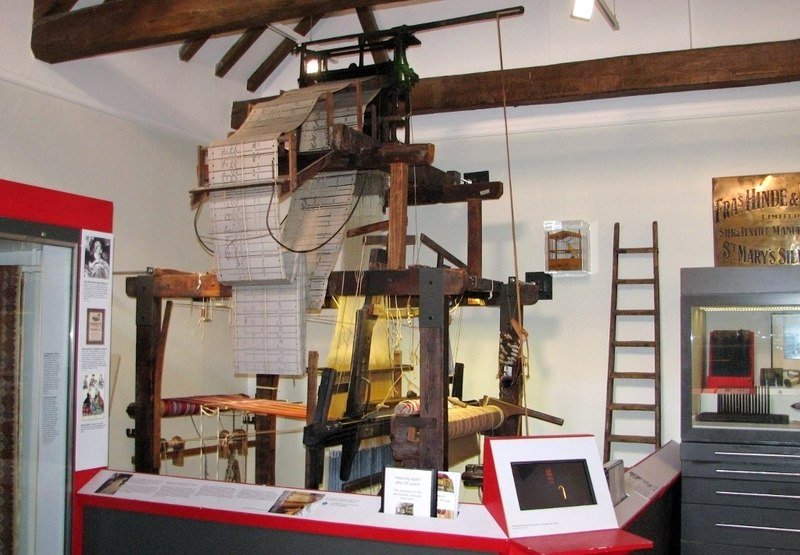
The last Jacquard loom to have woven cloth in the city, exhibited at the Museum of Norwich

In 1923, the building was purchased by Sir Henry Holmes and donated to the city of Norwich. It was known as the Bridewell Museum. In the early 2010s, the museum underwent a major revamp costing £1.5 million. It was reopened in 2012 with 5,000 objects on display, including the last Jacquard loom to have woven cloth in Norwich, hats from Edwardian hat-maker Rumsey Wells, and a "history wall" mosaic created from over 9,000 photographs of Norwich that were submitted by the public. Following the restoration of the sculpture of Samson that had stood at Samson and Hercules House in Tombland, Norwich, since 1657, the Museum began a crowdfunding campaign in 2018 to raise £15,000 to put the sculpture on display. The campaign, nicknamed Saving Samson, was successful, and the sculpture was displayed at the museum in April 2019 inside a custom environmentally controlled glass case.

== Architecture ==
The original medieval building survives only in a fragmentary form, as an L-shaped range facing the alley by St Andrew's Church and constructed in three or more stages between the late 14th and early 15th centuries. It has two ranges of brick-vaulted undercrofts, which are the most extensive in Norwich.

== See also ==
- Norwich Castle
- Strangers' Hall
