= Elizabeth Haselwood =

British artist (c. 1644–1715)

- Born: 1644
- Died: 1715 (aged 70–71)
- Occupation: Silversmith

Elisabeth Haselwood (c. 1644 – 1715) was an English silversmith. She is the only woman silversmith recorded as having worked in Norwich.

A member of a prominent silversmithing family from Norwich, Haselwood learned the art from her husband, Arthur Haselwood II. He died in 1684, whereupon she registered a silver mark of her own; the actual date of its registration is unrecorded. It seems likely that she employed craftsmen in the continuation of the family business; even so, all of the pieces produced by her workshop bore her own personal stamp. The workshop was among the largest businesses in Norwich at the close of the seventeenth century; Haselwood left its oversight to her son, Arthur Haselwood III. She and her husband are buried in the south aisle of the Church of St Andrew.

A William III oval tobacco box of c. 1695 bearing Haselwood's hallmark is owned by the National Museum of Women in the Arts. It is the oldest object in the museum's silver collection. A beaker from the workshop is part of the Royal Collection, having been given to Elizabeth II in 1968. A total of fifteen church and twenty-nine secular pieces have survived.
