= Christopher Layer (merchant) =

16th-century English businessman and politician

Christopher Layer (1531 – 19 June 1600), of Norwich, Norfolk, was an English merchant, burgess of Norwich, and briefly a Member of Parliament.

== Biography ==
Layer was the son of William Layer, Mayor of Norwich and began his career as a grocer. He was one of the leading citizens of Norwich, serving as sheriff for 1569–1570, alderman in 1570 and mayor in 1581–1582 and 1589–1590. He imported goods from the Netherlands and invested in land and houses in Norwich, at Theberton, and elsewhere in Suffolk, and at Booton, Cawston, and Cringleford in Norfolk. His attempts to enclose the common at Great Witchingham in Norfolk led him into a long series of lawsuits.

Layer served briefly as one of the two Members of Parliament for Norwich in 1584–1585 and again in 1597–1598. During his second Parliament the two burgesses for Norwich were appointed to committees concerning navigation, the bishop of Norwich, land reclamation, cloth, and malt. During his membership, Norwich paid him five shillings a day while he attended the relatively brief parliamentary sessions.

Layer was described by an opponent as "a very politique and worldly minded man most regarding his own private commodity". His will disposed of his lands among his grandchildren and surviving children, provided for a substantial income for his widow, the sole executrix, and contained bequests to numerous relatives and friends and to the poor in Norwich and elsewhere. Layer died 19 June 1600 and was buried at St. John's, Maddermarket, Norwich.

The four figurines encased in the two pilasters of The Layer Monument in the Church of St. John Maddermarket are rare examples of Northern Mannerism sculpture in Britain.

Layer died in 1600. He had married Barbara, the daughter of Augustine Steward, with whom he had four sons and five daughters.
