= St John the Baptist Cathedral, Norwich =

Coordinates: 52.6292°N 1.2840°E

- Cathedral Church of St John the Baptist
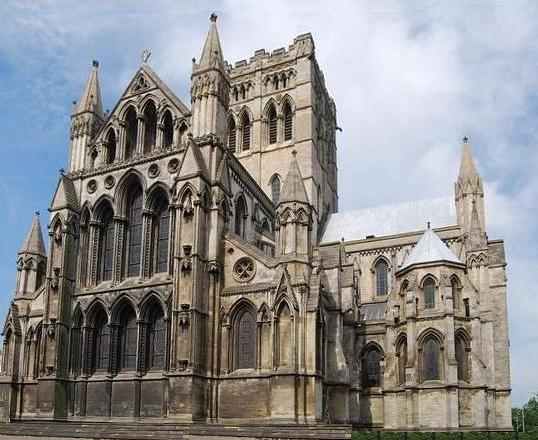

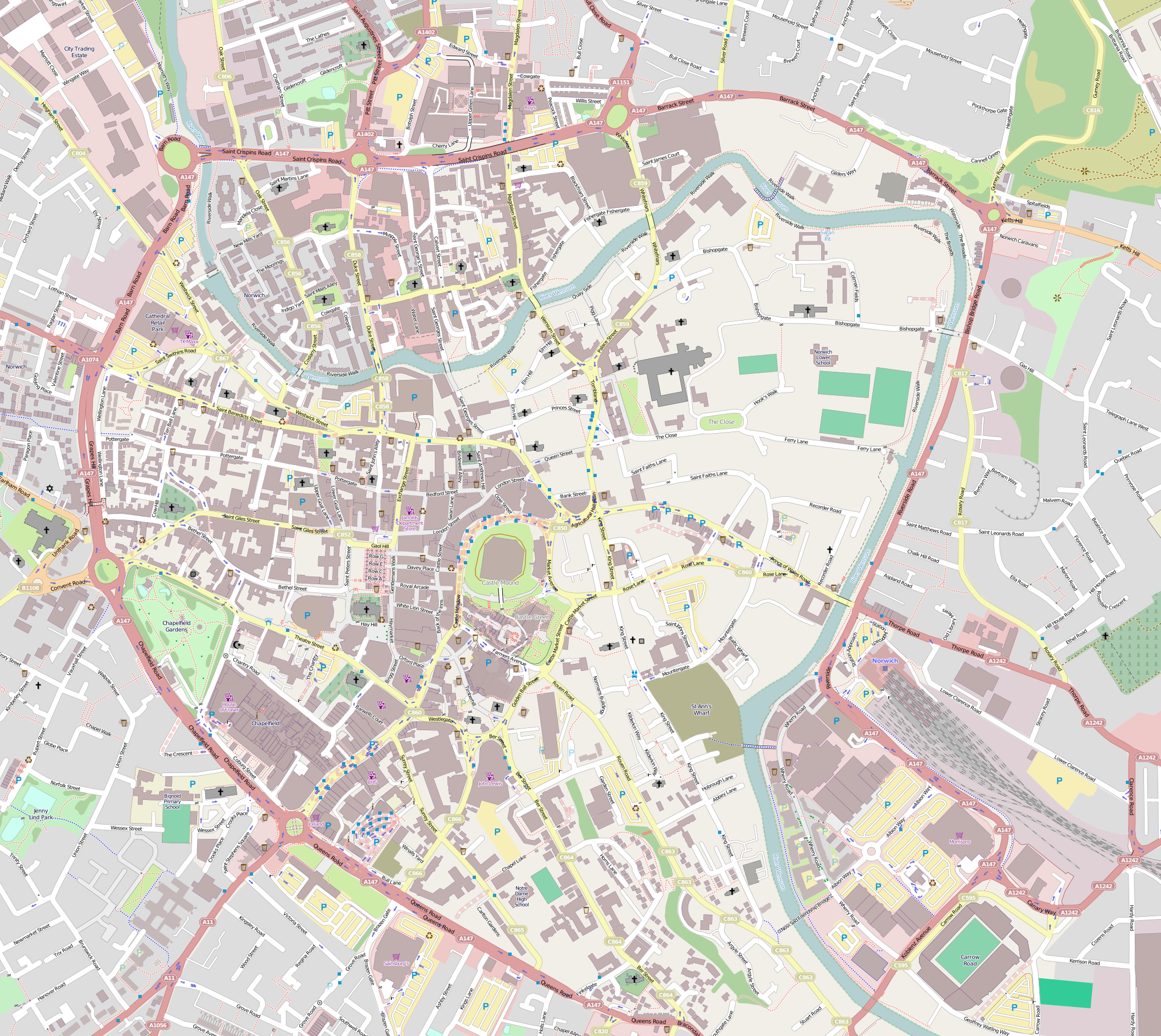
- Shown within Norwich
- OS grid reference: TG2233508547
- Location: Norwich, Norfolk
- Country: England
- Denomination: Roman Catholic
- Website: sjbcathedral.org.uk

History
- Status: Active
- Consecrated: 1910

Architecture
- Functional status: Cathedral
- Heritage designation: Grade I Listed
- Designated: 26 February 1954
- Architects: George Gilbert Scott, Jr.; John Oldrid Scott
- Style: Gothic Revival
- Years built: 1882-1910
- Construction cost: Approximately £230,000

Administration
- Province: Westminster
- Diocese: East Anglia

Clergy
- Bishop: Peter Collins
- Dean: Fr Martin Hardy

The Cathedral Church of St John the Baptist is a Roman Catholic cathedral in Norwich, Norfolk, England. The cathedral is the seat of the bishop of East Anglia and the mother church of the diocese of East Anglia. It is within the Province of Westminster.

== History ==
The cathedral, located on Unthank Road, was constructed between 1882 and 1910 to designs by George Gilbert Scott, Jr., as a parish church dedicated to John the Baptist, on the site of the Norwich City Gaol. The funds for its construction were provided by the 15th Duke of Norfolk, as a gesture of thanksgiving for his first marriage to Lady Flora Abney-Hastings.

In 1976, it was consecrated as the cathedral church for the newly erected Diocese of East Anglia and the seat of the Bishop of East Anglia. In 2014, for the first time since 1558, a Pontifical High Mass was celebrated in this episcopal see's cathedral.

It is one of two cathedrals in the city of Norwich, the other being the Church of England Cathedral Church of the Holy and Undivided Trinity, begun in the Norman style in 1096.

== Resources ==
Just off the south aisle of the cathedral is the Duckett Library. It was named after The V. Rev. Richard Canon Duckett, who was rector of the church from 1876 to 1910. It was opened on 22 February 2012. People need to become a member of the library to join, and that membership is available to all the cathedral's congregation. It has 3,000 religious publications and is staffed by volunteers.

Also, within the cathedral ground is the Narthex. It opened in March 2010 and is the cathedral's visitor centre. It comprises an Education and Interpretation Gallery, a shop, a refectory with outdoor patio, a function hall, licensed bar and community garden.

== Parish ==
The cathedral's parish also covers Holy Apostles Church, West Earlham, a suburb of Norwich.
