= St Andrew's Church, Norwich =

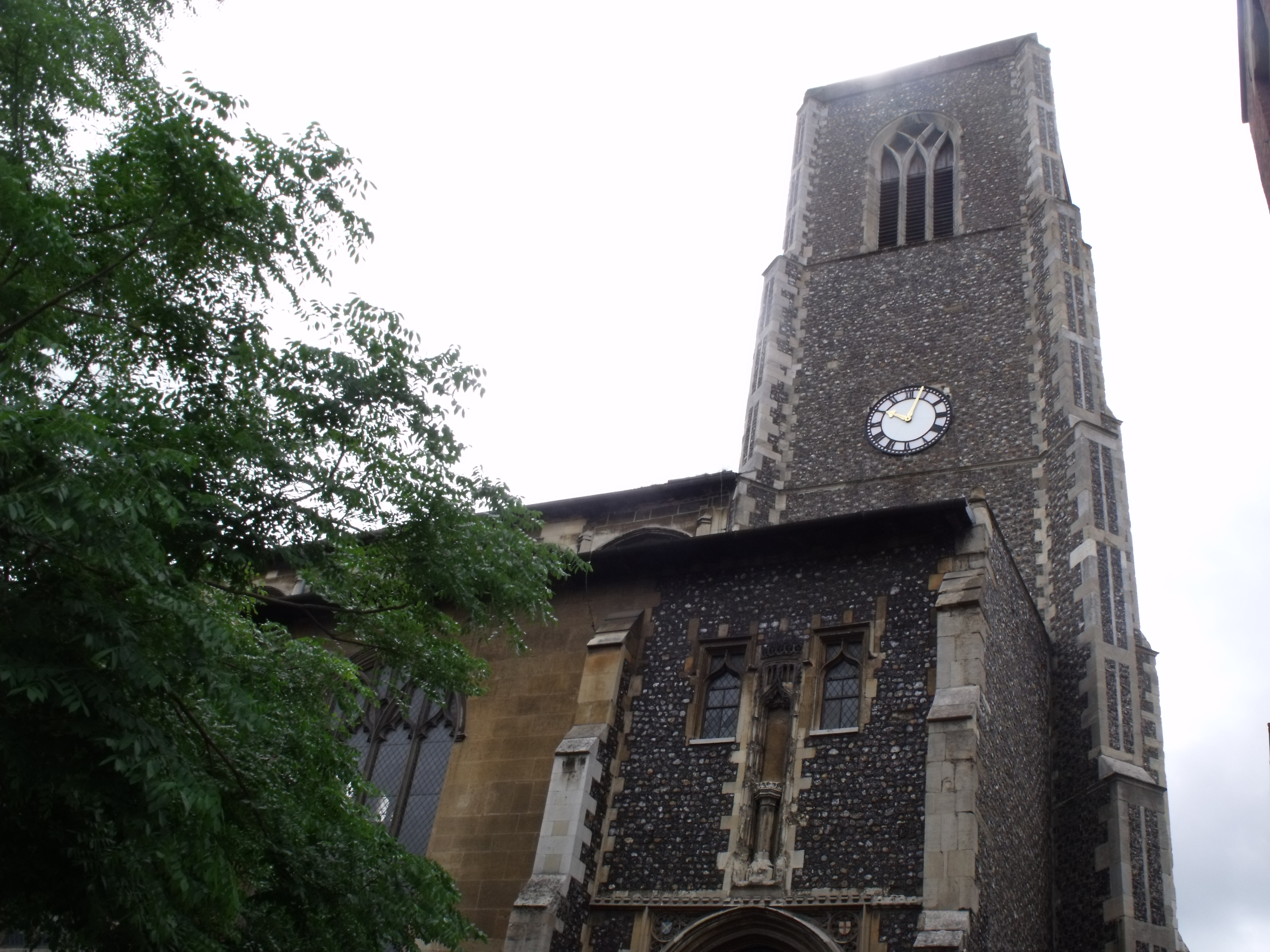
- St Andrew's Church, Norwich
- St Andrew's Church, Norwich
- 52°37′49″N 1°17′43″E
- OS grid reference: TG 23109 08716
- Location: Norwich, Norfolk
- Country: England
- Denomination: Church of England
- Churchmanship: Evangelical
- Website: standrewsnorwich.org

History
- Dedication: Andrew the Apostle

Architecture
- Heritage designation: Grade I listed

Administration
- Province: Province of Canterbury
- Diocese: Anglican Diocese of Norwich
- Archdeaconry: Norwich
- Deanery: Norwich East
- Parish: St Andrew's Norwich

St Andrew's Church, Norwich is a Grade I listed medieval building in Norwich. It is dedicated to Andrew the Apostle, being the only church in the city with this dedication.

== History ==
The fabric of the church was rebuilt in 1506; the name John Antell is connected with this rebuilding.

After the Reformation, St Andrew's became a centre of Puritanism. The advowson was in the hands of the parishioners, which was also the case for St Peter Mancroft and St Benedict, and until relatively late in the 19th century its parish held a preaching competition for applicants for the incumbency.

In August 1603 John Robinson (1576 - 1625) became associate pastor of St.Andrew's Church. Norwich at this time, had strong links with Holland and Flanders. It was the home to a considerable number of foreign workers and refugees and its most influential political leaders and merchants were Puritans. Robinson was one of the founders of the Congregational church and later became pastor to the Pilgrim Fathers before their emigration to the New World.

=== Main dates ===
- 1386 – Bequests made to a church on this site
- 1478 – West tower under construction
- c.1496 – Work on West tower completed
- 1506 – Work completed on the nave and chancel, replacing the previous structure
- 1557 – Elizabeth Cooper, wife of a pewterer, after standing in the church during a service and publicly revoking her previous recantation concerning her religious conversion to Catholicism, was burned as a heretic alongside Simon Miller of Lynn on the 13th of July 1557 according to Foxe's Book of Martyrs.
- 1607 – Churchwardens excommunicated for installing special seating for local dignitaries
- 1637 – Font cover produced
- 1867 – Major restoration work undertaken including new pews, pulpit and stone screen
- 1878 – Font replaced
- 1905 – Organ case installed

== Architecture ==
=== Exterior ===
In late Perpendicular Gothic style, it is the second largest church in Norwich, and one of the last medieval churches to be built in the city. The church consists of an integrated nave and chancel. It has north and south aisles, a west tower, and north and south porches. The church extends to the very end of the east churchyard, and its porches, made of flint, wrap around the tower. The building is generously faced with freestone, indicating the wealth of the parish at the time of its rebuilding. There is a flushwork frieze around the base of the church.

The tower dates from 1478. It now lacks its parapet, which had pinnacles at each corner in the middle of each side, replaced in the 1960s by a brick wall.

There is a row of carved shields on the east wall under the window, thought to have been transferred from the previous building and possibly associated with first mayor of Norwich William Appleyard who lived in the house to the north of the church, now the Bridewell Museum. The centre shield displays the Arms of the Passion, and the shields to its south are reversed so that the lions on these are not turning their backs to it. The shield to the north has been heavily defaced, though had three chalices with Eucharistic hosts.

=== Interior ===
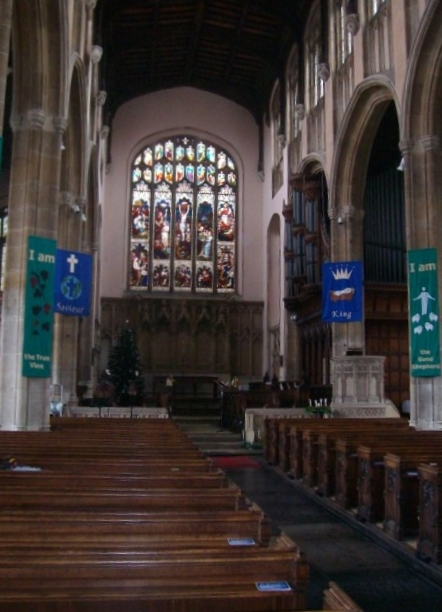
Interior of St Andrew's

The church has a singular timber roof of tie-beam construction. Though the chancel and chapels were originally divided from the nave by a rood screen which crossed the building from north to south. The doorways to the stairs are still visible. There is a chapel in the north-east corner is formerly of Saint Anne, though is now known as the Suckling chapel. There are fragments of medieval glass in the south aisle windows. These include a depiction of Death leading a bishop away which was formerly part of the Dance of Death which formerly occupied the clerestory windows. All furnishings date from the late 19th-century renovations, with nothing remaining of the medieval furnishings. There was a pulpit from 1741 which had been given by the church's vicar BJ Ellis and which stood in the centre of the middle alley, though this was removed in 1860. In 1841, the sedilia were restored which is early for this form of work. The reredos was installed in 1856. In 1863, the west gallery was removed, and in 1867, a low stone screen, pulpit and seating were added. The font was replaced in 1878 after the former version was found in pieces in the belfry; though its cover dates from 1637 and is similar in design to fonts in the neighbouring churches of St George Tombland and St Michael-at-Plea. The church's former medieval font is now at Walpole. Two boards over the south door at the west end of the nave record the church's turn to Puritanism after the Reformation.

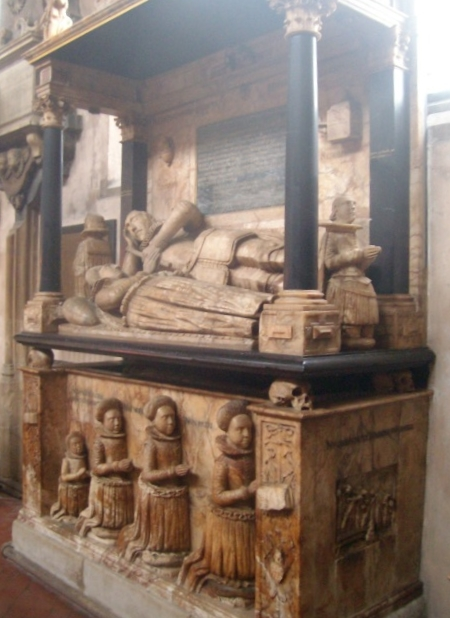
Alabaster monument (circa 1611) to Sir John Suckling

The church according to Nicholas Groves has one of the finest collections of church memorials in Norwich. On the north wall of the Suckling chapel there is one to Sir John Suckling, featuring very complex symbolism and inscriptions in five languages. There are also monuments to:

- Robert Suckling (d. 1589)
- Francis Rugge (d. 1607)
- Robert Garsett (d. 1613)
- Joseph Ellis, minister (d.1694,17 Feb.), mural monument, with coat of arms (three eels)
- Dr. Thomas Crowe (d. 1751) by Robert Page
- John Custance (d. 1752) by Thomas Rawlins
- Hambleton Custance (d. 1757) by Thomas Rawlins
- Richard Dennison (d. 1768) by Thomas Rawlins

Also interred at the church are silversmith Elizabeth Haselwood and her husband, Arthur Haselwood II himself also a silversmith.

The first organ in the church was installed in 1808. This was originally built by G.P. England in 1794, and had previously been in the Assembly House, then called Chapel Field House. This organ was removed from the church and in 1863 was installed at St Laurence, though later went to St Mary's, South Walsham. The current organ was installed in 1905 and is by Norman and Beard. The successor firm of Hill, Norman & Beard added pipes and swell sub-octave coupler in 1919 and rebuilt it in 1980. The case was also installed in 1905, although it is not the work of Norman & Beard. A specification of the organ can be found on the National Pipe Organ Register.
