= Samson and Hercules sculptures =

Pair of atlantids from 1657

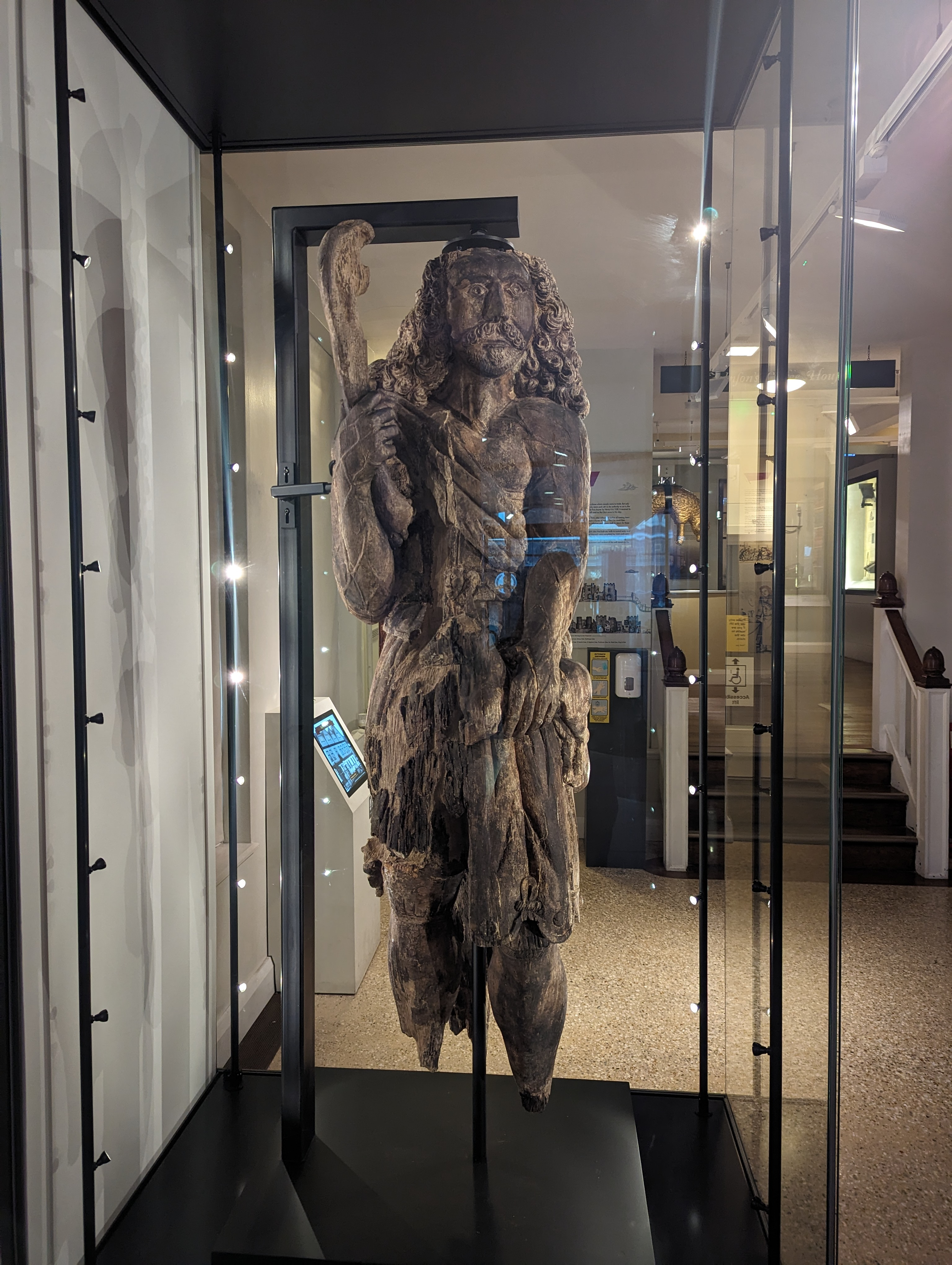
- The surviving original Samson sculpture at the Museum of Norwich at the Bridewell
- Year: 1657
- Medium: Oak wood
- Subject: Samson and Hercules
- Condition: Partially lost
- Location: Museum of Norwich at the Bridewell; Norwich
- Owner: Norfolk Museums Service
- Accession: 2010.38.1; 2010.39

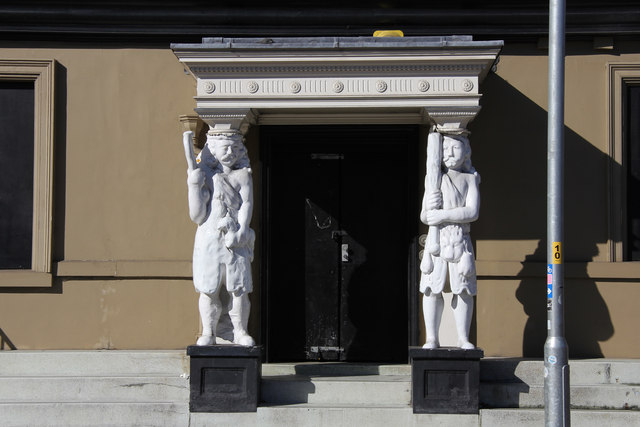
The fibreglass replicas of the Samson (left) and Hercules (right) sculptures, at the entrance to Samson and Hercules House in 2013

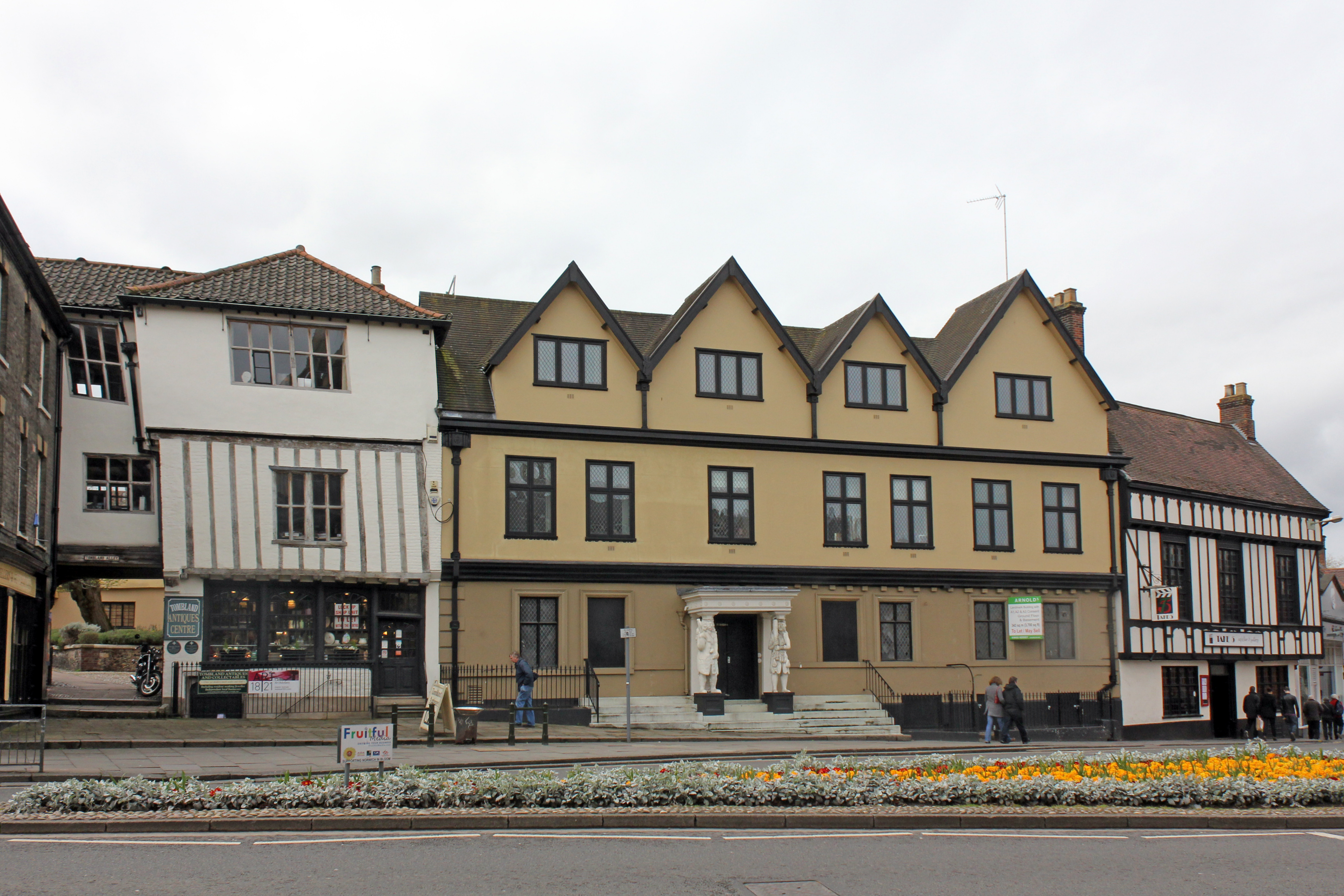
Samson and Hercules House in 2012

The Samson and Hercules sculptures were a pair of oak atlantids of the biblical character Samson and Roman hero Hercules, carved in 1657 and situated at Samson and Hercules House, 15 Tombland, Norwich. The Samson sculpture now resides in a restored state at the Museum of Norwich at the Bridewell, but the original Hercules sculpture, then 233 years old, was lost in 1890 due to decaying beyond repair.

== History ==
The sculptures were commissioned in a pair by the Mayor of Norwich Christopher Jay in 1657, to be placed outside his new home in Tombland, Norwich. The Samson sculpture was carved from a single oak tree trunk.

The figures were moved to the building's rear courtyard in 1789, but were placed back at the front door in 1890, by which point the original Hercules sculpture had decayed beyond repair and was replaced by a replica. From 1934 until 2003, the building operated as a dance hall and later a nightclub. The venue was named Samson and Hercules House during World War II, but later was rebranded to Ritzy's in 1983.

=== Restoration ===
In the summer of 1992, the Samson sculpture's right arm fell off, prompting Norfolk Museums Service (NMS) to remove the sculptures. They were replaced at the venue with fibreglass replicas in 1998.

Conservation firm Plowden & Smith were commissioned by the NMS in 2014, and oversaw a four-year process to remove 60 layers of lead paint, weighing 28 kilograms (62 lb), that had built up on the Samson sculpture. Due to water damage, fungus had accumulated in the sculpture's head, and "severe and extensive rot" of the whole sculpture had led to its wood becoming soft. This was treated with liquid consolidant, while a missing section of its torso was refilled with cellulose fibre. The treatment cost £32,000, and was nominated for "best restoration project of the year" at the Museums + Heritage Show after it was completed in 2019.

When restored, the sculpture could not be put on display due to its vulnerability. In 2018, the Museum of Norwich at the Bridewell began a crowdfunding campaign, "Saving Samson", which raised the £15,000 needed to purchase an environmentally controlled glass case. It was unveiled at the museum in April 2019.

== Fibreglass replicas ==
Fibreglass replicas of the sculptures replaced the original Samson sculpture and the first Hercules sculpture replica in 1998. These replicas were at one point painted red when the house became a lobster restaurant, and painted other colours in years since.

For Norwich's GoGoSafari trail in 2025, the sculptures were painted by sculpture artist Matt Reeve to match his painted rhino sculpture which was placed outside the house, at that point the Mortgage Advice Bureau. The design was inspired by the pop art movement as well as street art, surf culture and the style of 1980s New York street artist Keith Haring, and was titled Chromatic Tapestries.
