= Thomas Rawlins (sculptor) =

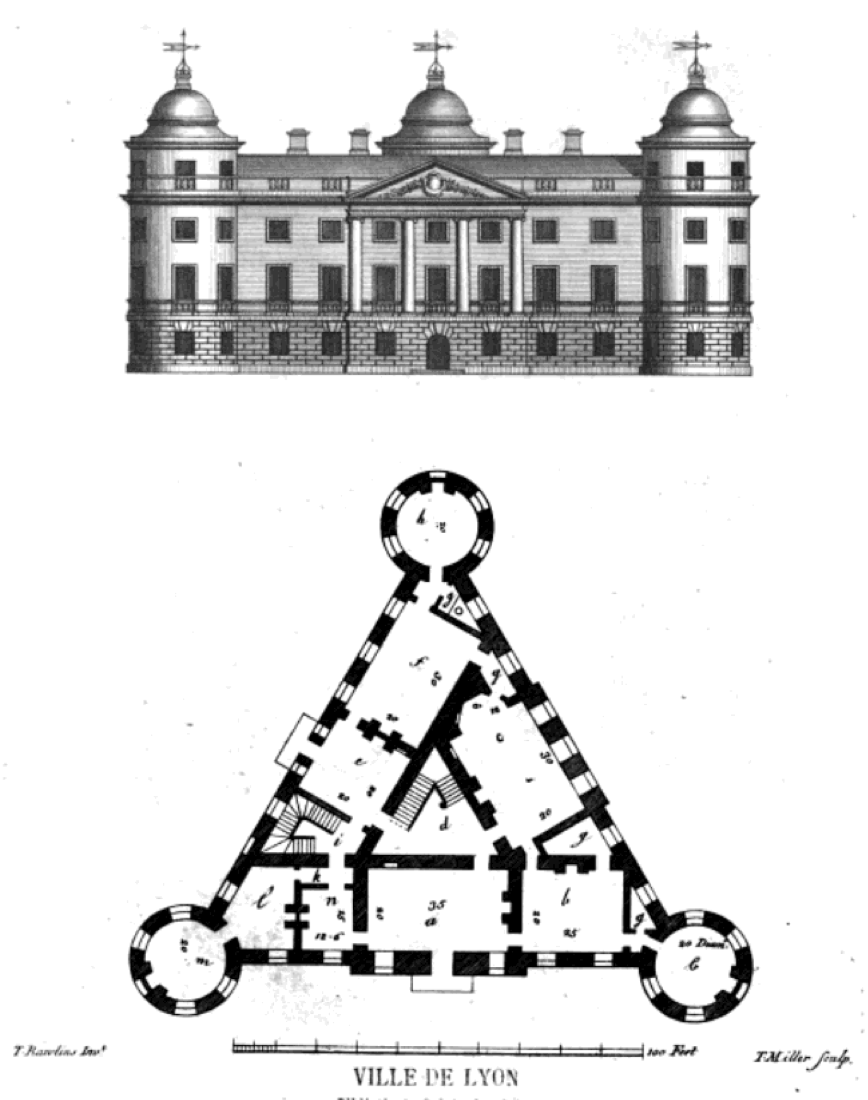
- Illustration from Rawlins' pattern book, Familiar Architecture
- Born: 1727
- Died: 18 March 1789
- Occupations: Sculptor, architect, author
- Known for: Funary Monuments
- Notable work: Monument for Sir Thomas Churchman at St Giles' Church, Norwich

Thomas Rawlins (1727–1789) was an English sculptor, architect and architectural author, who specialized in funerary monuments.

== Biography ==
Thomas Rawlins was the son of a Norwich worsted weaver. He was trained by a London sculptor and ran a successful business as a funerary monument mason in Norwich from circa 1743–81, specialising in coloured marbles. In 1753 he advertised himself as, a carver and mason at Duke's Palace Yard, Norwich of monuments and chimney pieces both ancient and modern.

Ranking high as a sculptor in the view of art historian Nicholas Pevsner, Rawlins' style spans from late Baroque Rococo to Neoclassical. This stylistic change, according to Pevsner, is illustrated by two monuments in St Andrew's Church, Norwich, the first to John Custance (circa 1756) the second to Richard Dennison (circa 1767). Later monuments to William Wilcocks (1714–1770) in St Swithin's (now Norwich Arts Centre), and Robert Rushbrook (1705–81) in Saint John the Baptist, Maddermarket, Norwich, display a great awareness of neo-classical motifs. His monument for Sir Thomas Churchman at St Giles' Church, Norwich however, is considered to be his finest work. It features a medallion portrait and a sarcophagus, which is decorated with allegorical figures representing Vanity, Time, and Judgement, along with an Egyptian pyramid in construction.

Rawlins also practised as an architect. His designs, like his contemporary Thomas Ivory, architect of the Octagon Chapel (1756), were Neo-Palladian in style. He competed for the Royal Exchange (City Hall, Dublin) in 1769, and exhibited designs at the Society of Artists in 1767, 1769 and 1770 and at the Royal Academy in 1773, 1774 and 1776.

In 1765 the Ipswich Journal advertised a proposed work on architecture by Rawlins and in 1768 he published a pattern book, Familiar Architecture: or Original Designs of Houses for Gentlemen and Tradesmen; Parsonages; Summer Retreats; Banqueting-Rooms; and Churches. Further editions of Rawlins' pattern book were issued in 1789 and 1795, and in contemporary times it has been called influential and practical. Archer (2005) suggests that Rawlins' book was seeking to address a bourgeois provincial, rather than an elite metropolitan, clientele, and notes his emphasis on the need for flexibility on questions of proportion so as to fit buildings to the inclinations of their owners.

His only documented architectural works are the entrance to St. Andrew's and Blackfriars' Hall, Norwich in 1774, (subsequently rebuilt) and Weston House completed in 1781 for John Custance at Weston Longville. The Blackfriars entrance was in a Gothic style, and housed Norwich Library. The house was described by one critic as a "dull five-by-five bay two-and-a-half-story house" it later became the residence of Parson James Woodforde, and was demolished in 1926. In 1772 his reinforcement with ironwork of the south aisle of Saint John the Baptist at Maddermarket became the subject of satirical verses. Nonetheless, Rawlins is commemorated by a stone in the floor of the church, describing him simply as an architect who died on 18 March 1789.

== Works ==
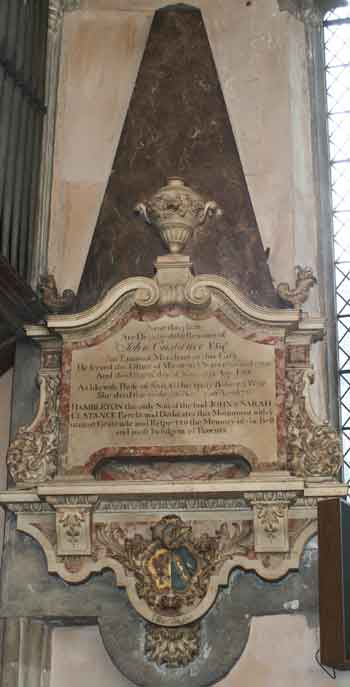
Monument to John Custance by Thomas Rawlins (circa 1756), St Andrew's Church, Norwich

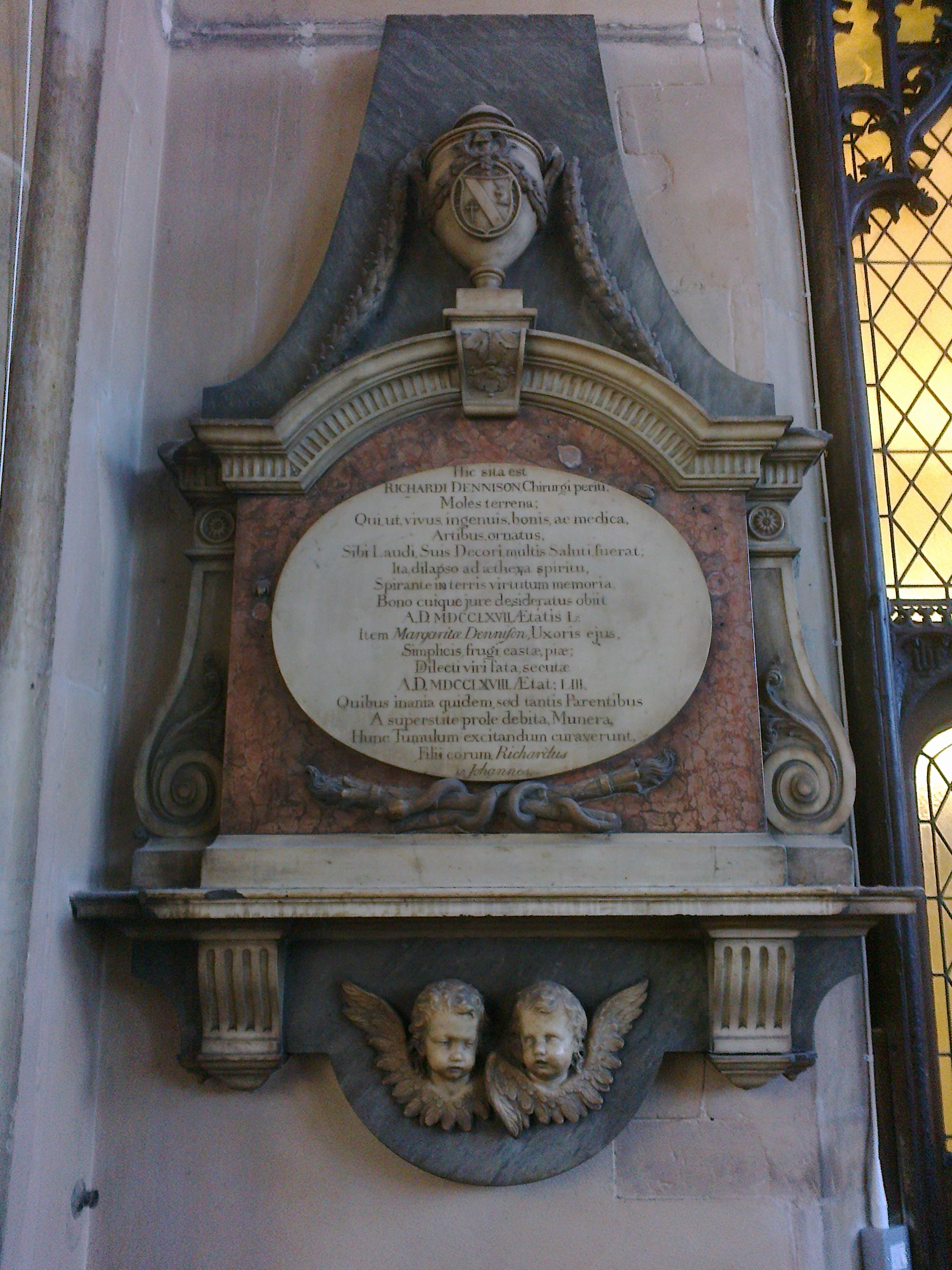
Richard Dennison's monument (1767) St Andrew's Church, Norwich

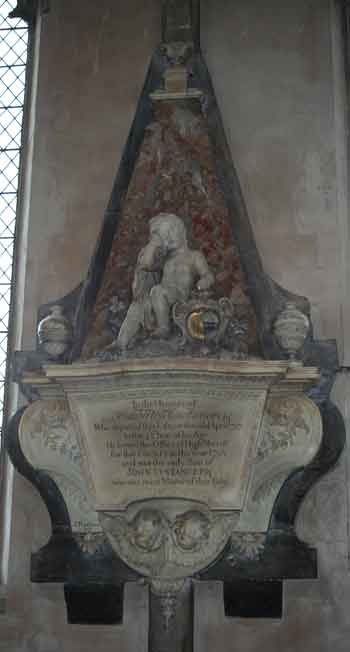
Hambleton Custance's monument (1757) St Andrew's Church, Norwich

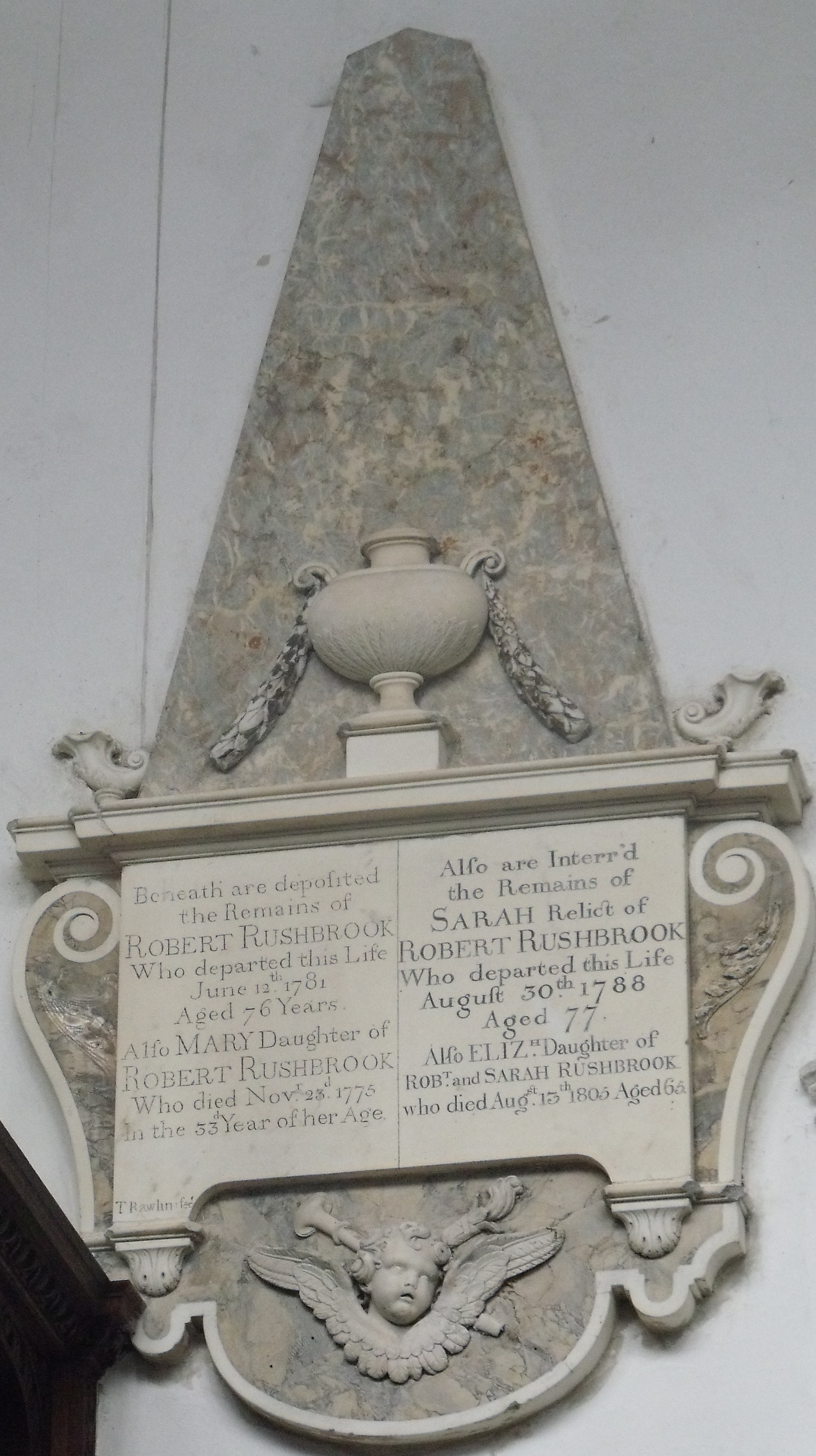
Robert Rushbrook's monument (1781) Saint John the Baptist, Maddermarket, Norwich

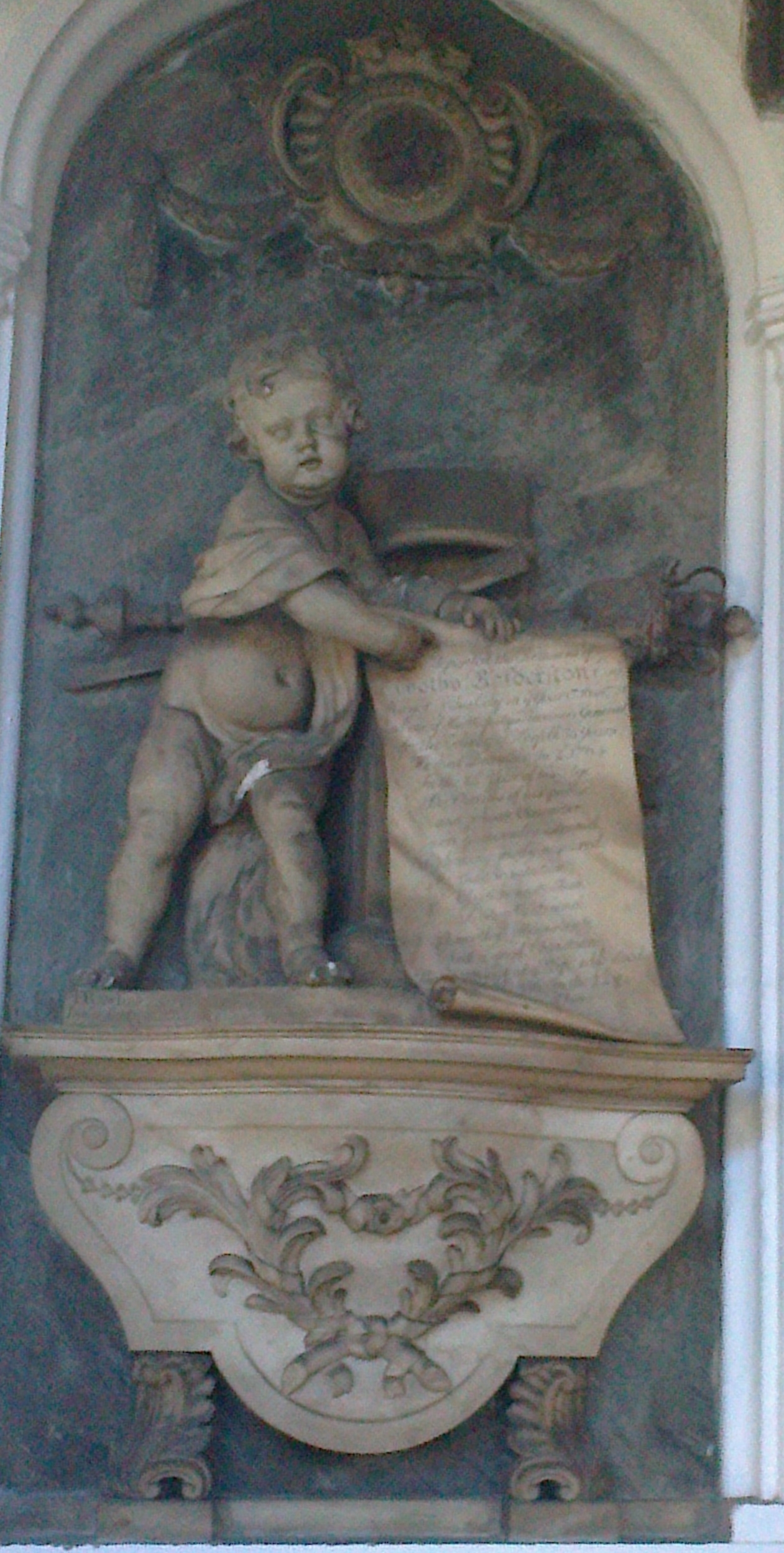
Timothy Balderston's monument (1764) St George's Church, Colegate, Norwich

== Sources ==
- A Biographical Dictionary of Sculptors in Britain, 1660–1851 (Paul Mellon Centre for Studies in British Art) edited by Ingrid Roscoe, Emma Elizabeth Hardy, M. G. Sullivan pub. Yale University Press 2009
