= Earlham Road =

Road in Norwich, Norfolk, England

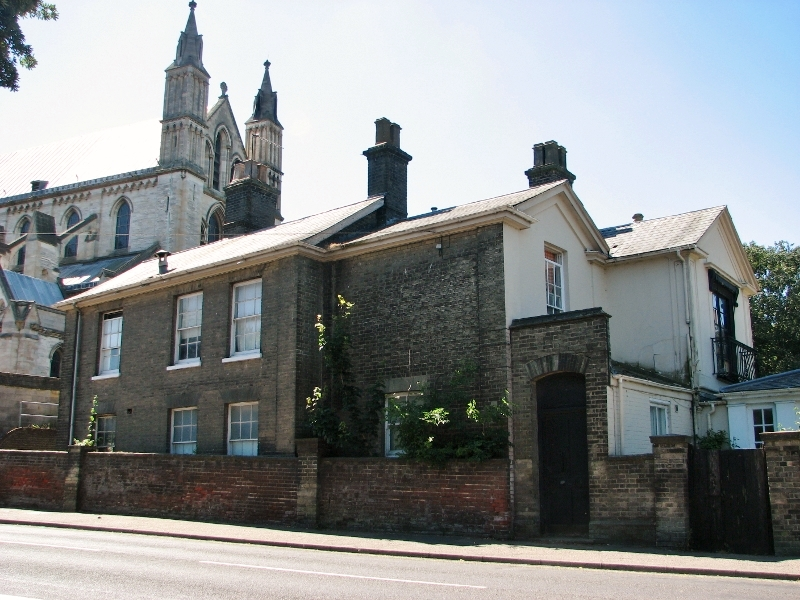
- The Grosvenor Hotel, with the Roman Catholic Cathedral of St John the Baptist in the background

- Location within Norfolk Location within the United Kingdom
- Maintained by: Norwich City Council
- Coordinates: 52°37′49.7″N 1°16′33.5″E

Earlham Road (the B1108) is a road in Norwich, England, linking the city centre to the area of Earlham to the west of the city and the Norwich southern bypass (A47) beyond.

== Details ==
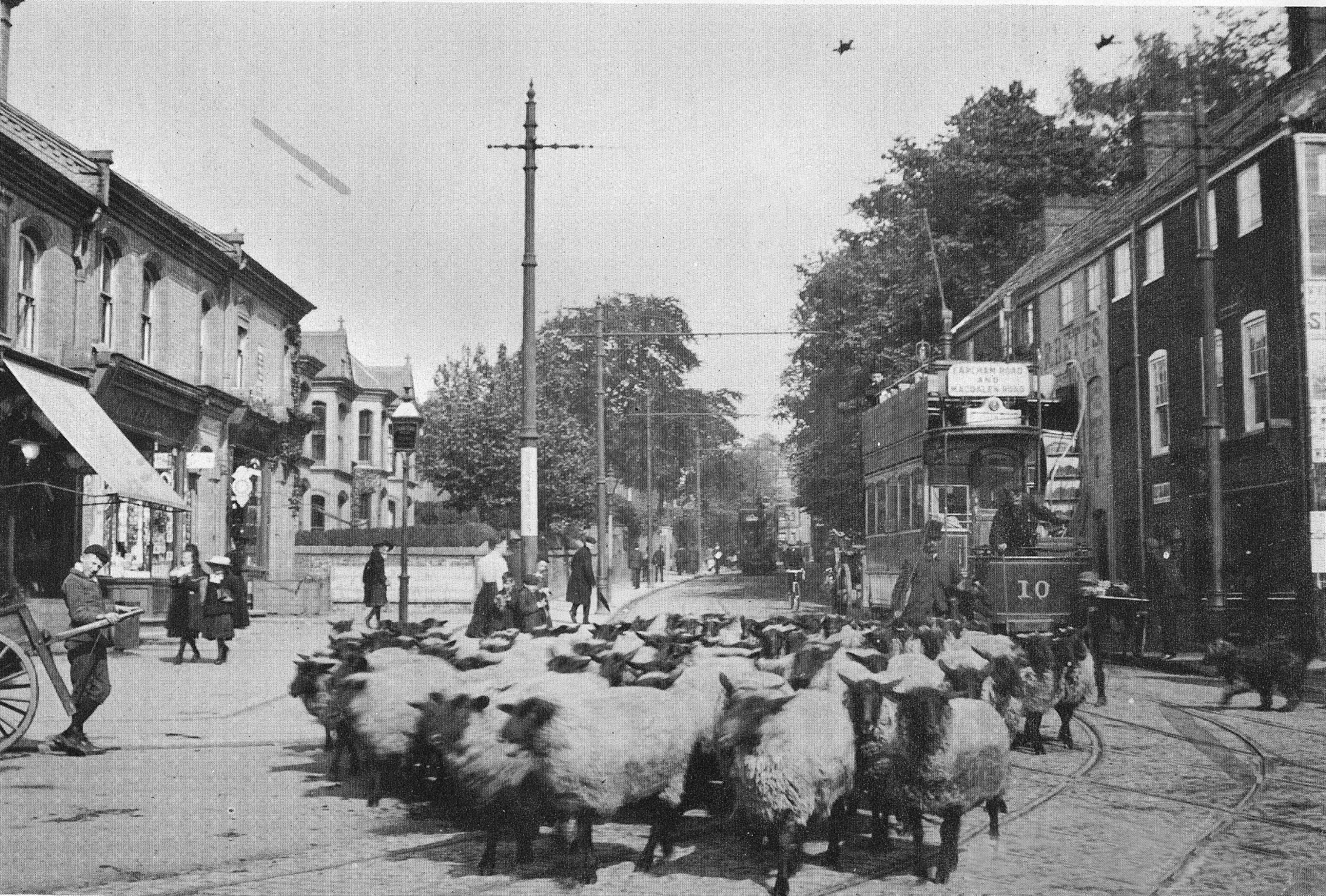
Sheep along the Earlham Road, showing a No 10 tram outside the Black Horse pub, about 1900.

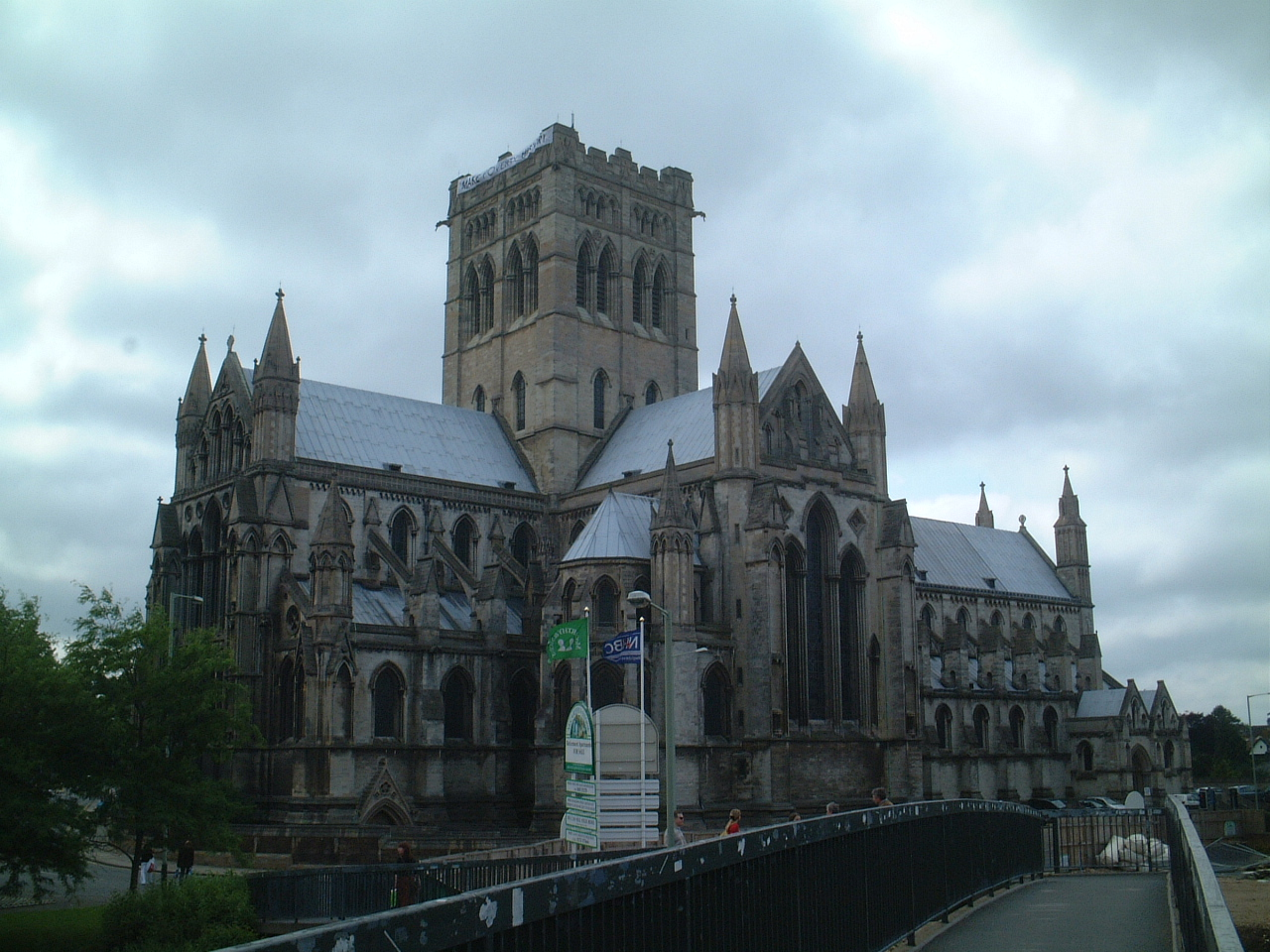
The Roman Catholic Cathedral of St John the Baptist, located at the city end of Earlham Road in Norwich.

The road formerly marked the northern limit of the Golden Triangle, a prime residential area of southwest Norwich. The term has since been expanded by local estate agents to include most of the southern region of the city within the outer ring road.

At the city end of Earlham Road lies the Roman Catholic Cathedral of St. John the Baptist, a dominant Neo-Gothic building built as a church in 1882 and designed by brothers George Gilbert Scott Junior and John Oldrid Scott. Almost directly opposite lies the city's only synagogue. Nearby is St. Thomas's Church of England parish church, at the bottom of Edinburgh Road and Caernarvon Road.

The stretch of road between the city centre and the ring road has a number of pubs, including the Black Horse, the Mitre, and the Workshop popular among the large student population in the area. Shortly beyond the ring road lies City Academy Norwich, a secondary school that has been oversubscribed since the closure of the failing Bowthorpe School nearby.

The main entrance to the University of East Anglia (UEA) is just beyond Earlham School. On the other side of the road is Earlham Park, comprising part of the former grounds of Earlham Hall, a country house used by UEA since the university opened in 1963 and now home to its law school.

Since the building of the new Norfolk and Norwich University Hospital on the B1108 on the eastern edge of the city, Earlham Road has become the main artery out of the city for ambulances.

== Notable events ==
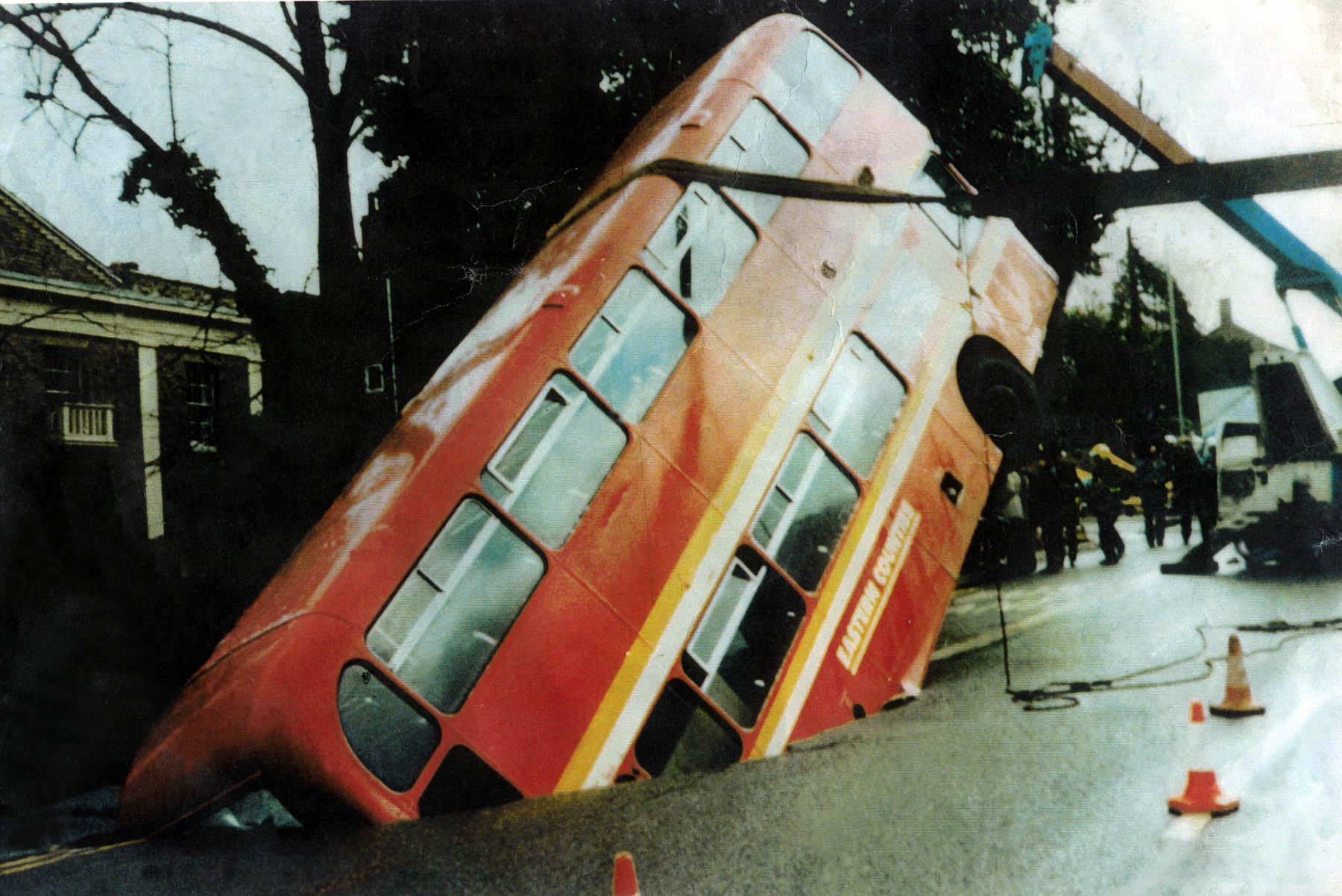
Few pictures of the event exist, the most well-known one being used for the Cadbury's Double Decker advertisements.

On 3 March 1988, Earlham Road was the scene of the bizarre sinking of a double-decker bus. The cause of the event was found to be the collapse of a medieval chalk mine discovered under the road. The source of the photograph circulated across the globe via various internet humour websites and email circulars is not known; the image shown is from a different source.

The day after the bus incident, following the publication of photos in national newspapers, Cadbury's began using the photo with the catchline 'Nothing fills a hole like a Double Decker', in reference to the company's chocolate bar. The advert won a series of awards and international recognition.
