= The Layer Monument =

Early 17th-century marble monument

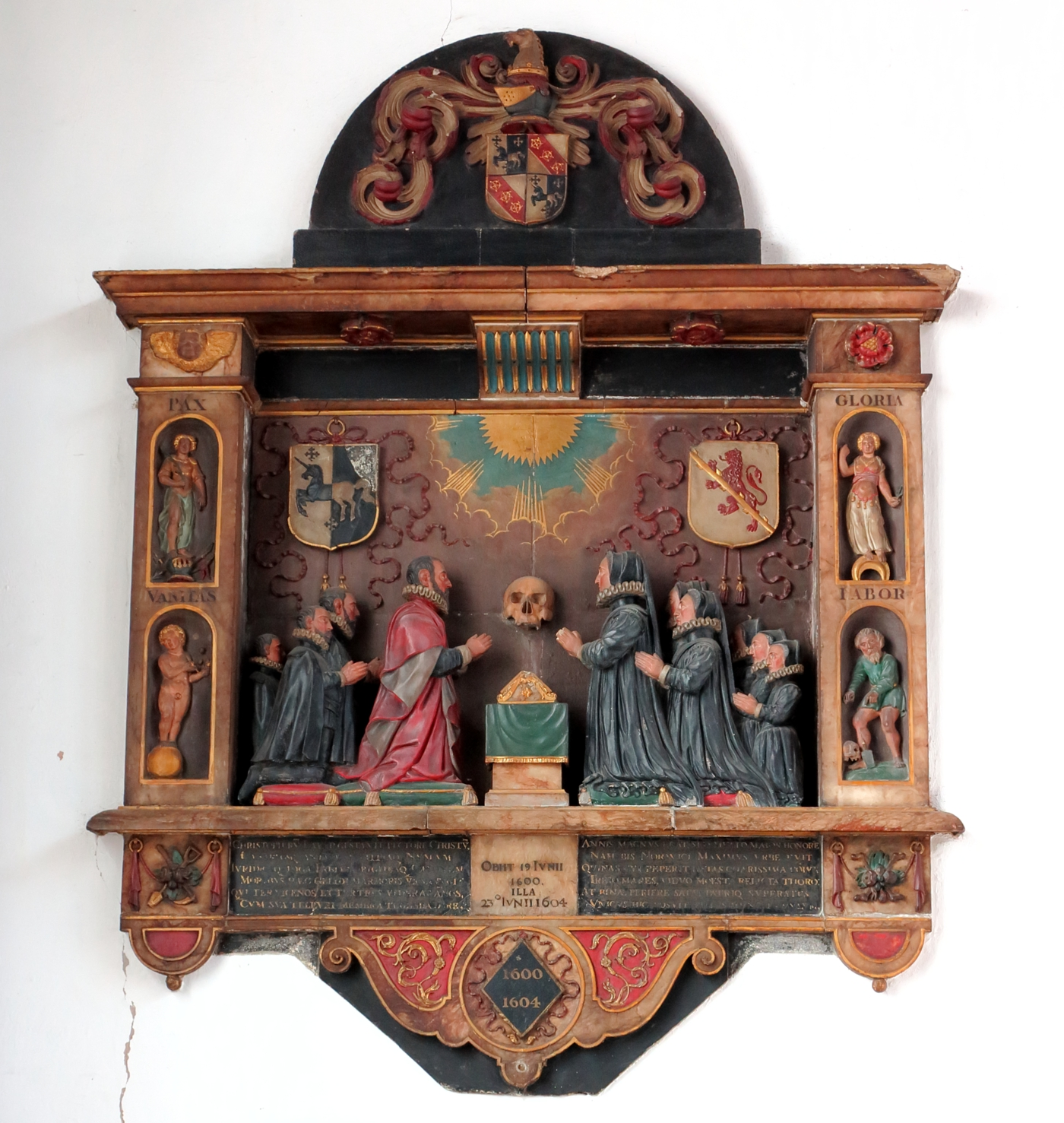
Marble polychrome monument circa 1600 with Northern Mannerist style figurines.

The Layer monument is an early 17th-century polychrome marble mural monument (320 × 350 cm) erected in the memory of the merchant Christopher Layer (1531–1600), and located in the Church of Saint John the Baptist, Norwich.

== Inscription ==
Its inscription is in Latin, and reads in translation:

This Urn of cold marble covers Christopher Layer who bore Christ in his heart along with Imperial Minds, Numa known for his justice, Fabius for his legal robe, and Cato for his strict morals. He had seen thrice twenty and thrice three years when he gave his body to be covered by the earth. He was great in years but greater with much honour, for twice he was Mayor of Norwich. His dearest wife bore him five daughters and three sons when she became a sad relic with a widow's bed. But two sons died and the one who survived his father placed here this tomb. Father died 19 June 1600 Mother died 23 January 1604.

== Interpretation ==
The monument is notable on two accounts, firstly, its four figurines housed in its two columns, Pax and Gloria, Vanitas and Labor, are relatively rare examples of Northern Mannerist sculpture extant in Britain; secondly, these four figurines exemplify how, during the era of Elizabeth I, Christian iconography occasionally integrated symbolism which originated from the western esoteric traditions of alchemy and astrology into works of art, including funerary monuments.

== The Layer Quaternity ==
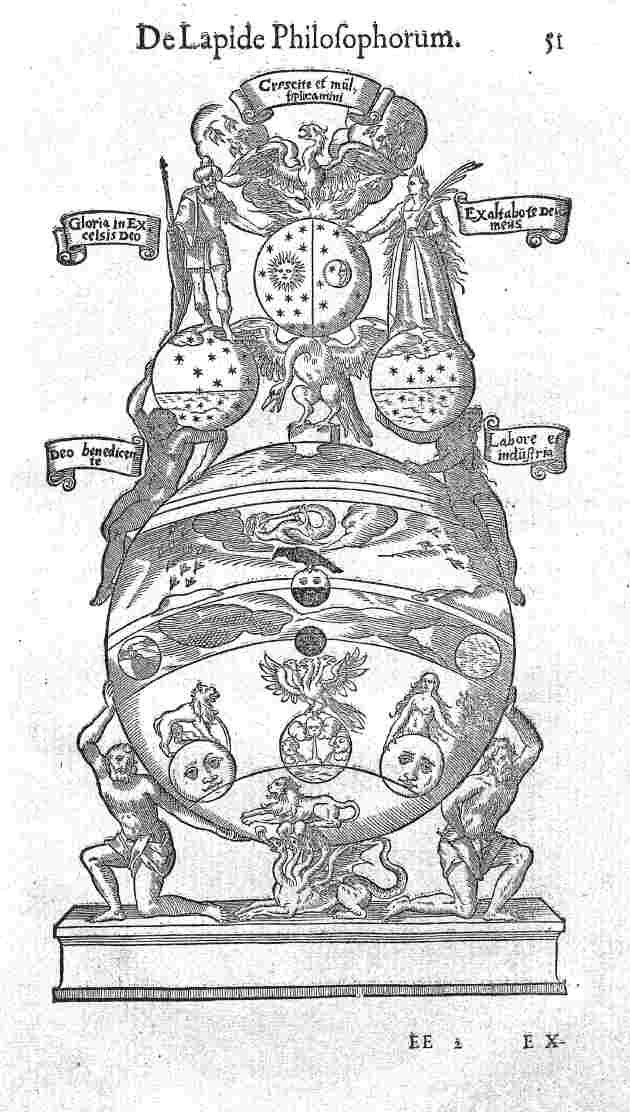
"The Philosophers' Stone" from Alchemia (1606) by Andreas Libavius

The four figurines of The Layer Quaternity share a number of iconographical details with those found in an illustration in Alchemia (1606) by the German academic Andreas Libavius in its chapter entitled De Lapide Philosophorum (The Philosophers' Stone). These include - an identical pairing of a lower, mortal pair with an immortal pair, a bare-legged male with a draped female above, the titulary captions of Gloria and Labor, a palm branch, the sun and moon, and a rotundum.

Symbolically, the Layer Quaternity correspond to the alchemical "deities" of Apollo, Luna, Mercurius and Vulcan as named in Atalanta Fugiens (1617) by the German alchemist-physician Michael Maier (Emblem XVII).

Collectively the Layer Quaternity are a unique alchemical mandala. Through polarized symbolism they delineate essential coordinates associated with Mandala art, namely Space (Heaven and Earth) and Time (Young and Old). Utilizing variety and multiplicity, key attributes of Northern Mannerist art, they also represent fundamental aspects of the human condition, namely, gender, youth and age, pleasure and suffering. A fifth, uniting symbol, a skull, is located at the very centre of the monument. The skull is the commonest of all memento mori symbols in funerary art. It was also defined as the philosophical vessel (Vas Philosophorum) in Renaissance-era alchemy.

The role of the Quaternity in religious symbolism is discussed in depth in the writings of the Swiss psychologist Carl Gustav Jung. In essence, the Layer monument's four figurines represent spiritual entities which agree with Jung's analytical psychology, that the psyche moves toward individuation in fours (made up of pairs of opposites).

== See also ==
- Northern Mannerism
