= St John Maddermarket =

Coordinates: 52.6300°N 1.2927°E

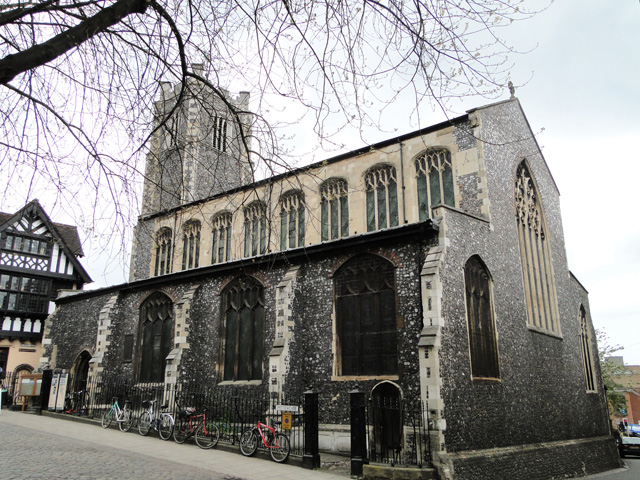
- St John Maddermarket in 2010

- Location in Norfolk
- OS grid reference: TG 229 087
- Location: Maddermarket, Norwich, Norfolk
- Country: England
- Denomination: Anglican
- Website: Churches Conservation Trust

History
- Dedication: Saint John the Baptist

Architecture
- Functional status: Redundant
- Heritage designation: Grade I
- Designated: 26 February 1954
- Architectural type: Church
- Style: Gothic

Specifications
- Materials: Flint with stone and brick dressings; some ashlar

St John Maddermarket is a redundant Anglican church in the city of Norwich, Norfolk, England. It is recorded in the National Heritage List for England as a designated Grade I listed building, and is in the care of the Churches Conservation Trust. It is dedicated to Saint John the Baptist, and its suffix usually comes from the sale of madder flowers for red dye, though there is no evidence of such a market existing nearby.

== History ==
There may have been a church on the site in the 11th century; it possibly appears in the Domesday Book where it is called Holy Trinity. However, the earliest fabric in the present church dates from the 14th century.

Most of the church dates from a major rebuilding between about 1445 to 1510. This rebuilding without a chancel on the east end led to the church's truncated effect. There has been a tradition that the shortening took place in 1578 when the street was widened for a visit by Elizabeth I, allegedly allowing her to visit the Duke's Palace which stood on the site of what is now a multi-storey car park to the church's north, but this is considered to be untrue. Following this, the major changes were to the interior of the church. At some time a medieval chancel screen was removed.

In 1600, famous comic actor William Kempe ended his Nine Daies Wonder, in which he morris danced from London to Norwich, by jumping the wall of St John Maddermarket's churchyard.

In 1849 a gallery was installed at the west end. Restorations took place in the 19th century; these included rebuilding the tower in 1822, and refurbishing the interior of the roof and rebuilding the walls in 1863. Also in 1863 the interior was reordered. There was a gas explosion in the church in 1876, in which much of the stained glass was damaged, as well as the nave roof. At the beginning of the 20th century the vicar, Reverend William Busby, installed items of furniture collected from other churches. In 1914–15 work was done on the Lady chapel. The church was closed for Anglican worship on 31 December 1981 and used by a community from the Greek Orthodox Church from 1982 until 1990, when it was vested in the Churches Conservation Trust.

== Architecture ==
=== Exterior ===
The church is constructed mainly in flint with stone and brick dressings. The clerestory is faced with ashlar. The aisles are roofed with lead, and the rest of the church is slated. Its plan consists of a four-bay nave and chancel in one unit, north and south aisles extending the full length of the church, north and south porches, a north vestry, and a west tower. The east ends of the aisles have been converted into chapels, the south chapel being the Lady Chapel and on the north side the Jesus Chapel. The church is almost as wide as it is long, an effect caused by the absence of a structural chancel.

The tower is in four stages with diagonal buttresses. The bottom stage is open to the north and south, providing a passage for processions; the west arch is blocked. Above this is a rib vault decorated with twelve carved bosses.

Over the west arch is a three-light Perpendicular window. In the top stage are three-light louvred bell openings on each side. The parapet is crenellated, with corner pinnacles and statues. Along the south wall of the south aisle are five buttresses, with three three-light windows in the eastern bays. The western bay incorporates a two-storey porch. Under the easternmost window is a priest's door. Also on the south wall is a sundial dating from the 17th or 18th century. Along the clerestory are eight three-light Perpendicular windows. At the east end of the chancel is a large five-light window with Decorated tracery, and at the east end of each aisle is a three-light window.

The north porch also has two storeys. This north porch with its thick walls is likely all that remains of the original Anglo-Saxon church. The arch over its doorway is decorated with a band of shields, and over the arch is a niche for a statue and a three-light square-headed window; its relatively ornate design may have been due to its proximity to the main entrance to the Duke's Palace.

=== Interior ===
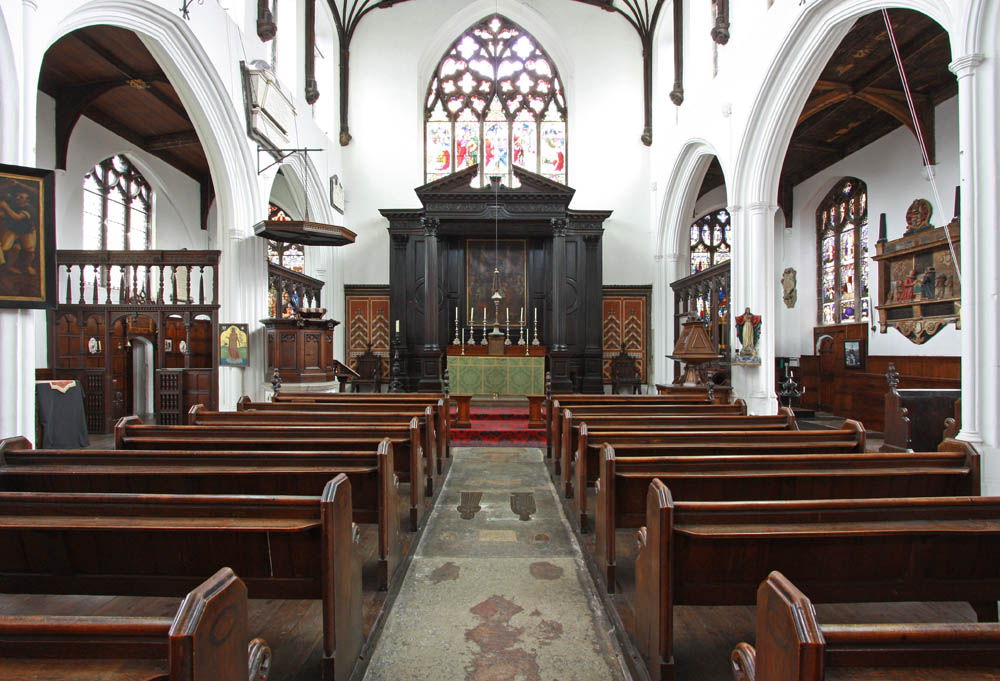
Interior showing the baldachin over the altar and the east window

At the east end of the church the altar is surrounded by a massive wooden surround, known as a baldachin. It is thought that this had been made for the church of St Miles Coslany in 1741 and moved into St John's in 1917. Behind the altar is a painting of the Last Supper attributed to the Renaissance painter Livio Agresti. There is another altar in the north aisle. The font dates from 1864, and is decorated with inlaid pieces of coloured marble. The pulpit dates from the same year. Above it is a sounding board from the 17th century. The revolving lectern dates from the 18th century, and is probably Italian. Around the church are memorials to local historical personages, including Thomas Rawlins, Joseph Stannard a Norwich School painter of marine-scenes, Walter Nugent Monck founder of the Maddermarket Theatre and Margaret Howard, Duchess of Norfolk, who died in 1564.

The church also houses commemorations of several mayors of the City throughout the centuries including the Southerton's, Bubbin and Ralph Segram (died 1472). Segram was a merchant who became a member of parliament and Mayor of Norwich. He commissioned a rood screen for the church, from which two panels of painted oak are now in the Victoria and Albert Museum in London. One panel depicts both William of Norwich, holding a hammer and with three nails in his head, and Agatha of Sicily, holding pincers and her severed breast. The other panel depicts Saint Leonard of Noblac (holding manacles) and Saint Catherine of Alexandria, holding a sword and a book.

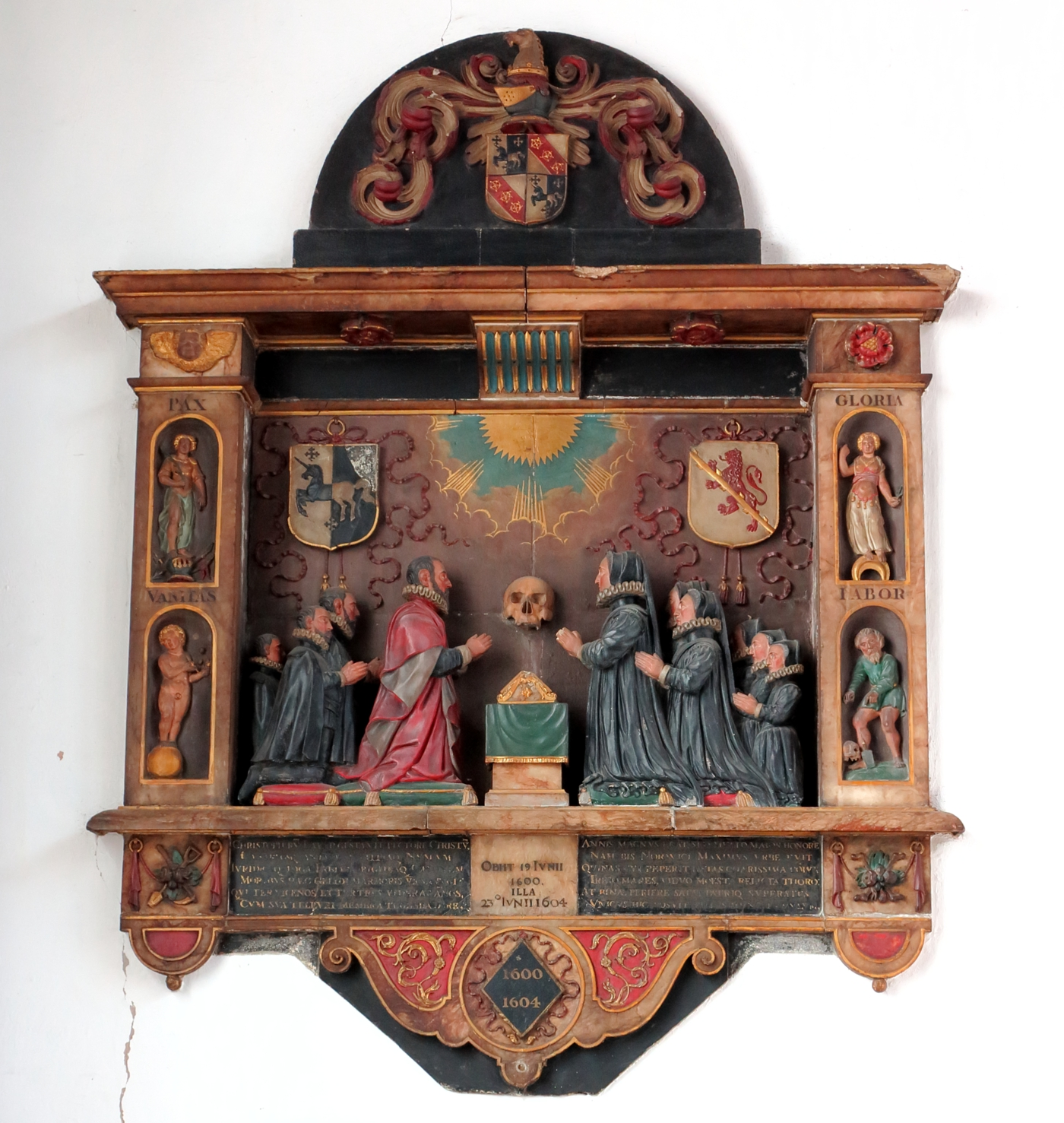
The Layer Monument: a marble polychrome mural monument circa 1600, on the south aisle of the west wall of the church.

Located semi-obscured on the south aisle of the church's west wall is The Layer Monument, a marble polychrome mural monument installed circa 1600 to commemorate the merchant, lawyer and mayor Christopher Layer. Its four figurines housed in its pilasters, Pax, Gloria, Vanitas and Labor are sculpted in the art-style of Northern Mannerism. Collectively the Layer Quaternity utilizes esoteric symbolism. The church also has identifiable associations with early British Freemasonry including a 19th-century headstone in its graveyard which depicts Masonic compasses along with the ancient Greek gnostic symbol of the Ouroboros.

The church houses one of the largest collections of monumental brasses in England, the oldest dating from the middle of the 15th century. Most of the stained glass dates from the 19th and 20th centuries, although there are fragments of 15th-century glass in the centre window of the north aisle. The east window dates from 1870 and depicts the healing of the Centurion's servant. In the north chapel is a depiction of the Annunciation made by James Powell and Sons, and in the south chapel is a Tree of Jesse from 1916, probably by King of Norwich.

The two-manual organ was made in 1888 by Norman and Beard for St Peter's Church, Lowestoft. It was moved to Norwich in 1904 and in 1913 it was rebuilt by Norman and Beard, and moved to the west gallery.

== See also ==
- List of churches preserved by the Churches Conservation Trust in the East of England
