= Golden Triangle (Norwich) =

Area within the southwestern suburbs Norwich, England

Coordinates: 52.6275°N 1.2817°E

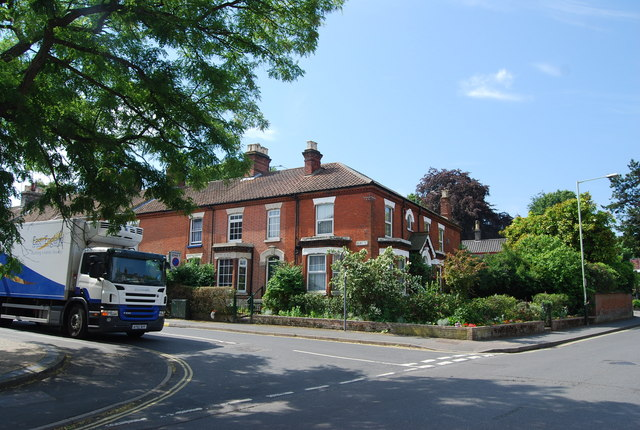
- Bury Street, off Unthank Road, Norwich

- Location within Norfolk
- OS grid reference: TG219080
- District: Norwich
- Shire county: Norfolk
- Region: East
- Country: England
- Sovereign state: United Kingdom
- Post town: NORWICH
- Postcode district: NR2
- Dialling code: 01603
- Police: Norfolk
- Fire: Norfolk
- Ambulance: East of England
- UK Parliament: Norwich South

The Golden Triangle is a wedge-shaped area within the southwestern suburbs of Norwich, United Kingdom. The base of the Triangle is at the Colman Road stretch of the outer ring road, which is one mile southwest of the city's inner ring, with the other two sides – Earlham Road and Newmarket Road – pointing into the city centre. The Unthank Road runs down the middle, forming the backbone and main shopping area of the Triangle. The Golden Triangle's terraces house professionals, families and many students from the nearby University of East Anglia; its friendly atmosphere has resulted in the Golden Triangle being dubbed the Norwich version of London's Notting Hill.

== Description ==
The district lies within the borders of the ancient roads into Norwich: Earlham Road and Newmarket Road. A narrower, neater triangle could be made on the map by replacing Newmarket Road with Unthank Road but this would be to exclude all the terraces lying between Unthank Road and Newmarket Road where the majority of the defining Unthank estate (see below) was situated. Most of the buildings in the area are Victorian terraces and town houses, largely constructed between the 1840s and early 1900s but with some post-World War II social housing. Similar, good-quality Victorian terraces are to be found between Earlham Road and Dereham Road although the streets do not conveniently fall into a triangle.

In the first construction of terraced house building, between 1815 and 1835, rows of Georgian houses and back-to-back cottages were built in Crooks Place and Union Place, just outside the city walls near Chapelfield Gardens. Most of this New City was demolished through slum clearance programmes after World War II, but the fine Crescent remains. Then, in the Victorian era, the old rural parish of Heigham was gradually urbanised. This involved the building of some better-grade housing, especially fronting Unthank Road, Newmarket Road and around Mount Pleasant, but most of the accommodation was in the rows of terraced housing behind.

The residential area has a cosmopolitan mix of students, professionals, and families. The area is characterised by its terraced housing, pubs and parks which offer small festivals during the summer months such as the GreenStock Festival in Heigham Park. In addition to Chapelfield Gardens (which is separated from the Golden Triangle by the inner ring road) are Heigham Park and the Jenny Lind open space.

== History ==
=== Toponymy ===
The name Golden Triangle was coined by Norwich estate agents during the 1980s property boom and the term was used to highlight this popular area for people to live in. As the city slowly crept outwards during the Victorian period, terraced housing was developed on land owned by a few rich landowners. The Heigham Lodge Estate of Timothy Steward (a rich brewer) gave rise to streets either side of the city end of Unthank Road e.g., Grosvenor and Clarendon Roads to the north of Unthank Road, and Trory, Ampthill and Oxford Streets to the south. These were developed from about 1850–1880. Towards the end of this period the southwestern part of the Triangle, which had been owned by the Dean and Chapter of Norwich Cathedral and was in the parish of Eaton, was developed to give rise to streets such as College Road and Glebe Road. One of the finest streets in the Eaton side of the Triangle was Christchurch Road with its large villas. But the largest block of humbler Victorian terraced housing was on the Unthank estate in the city-side parish of Heigham.

=== The Unthank estate ===
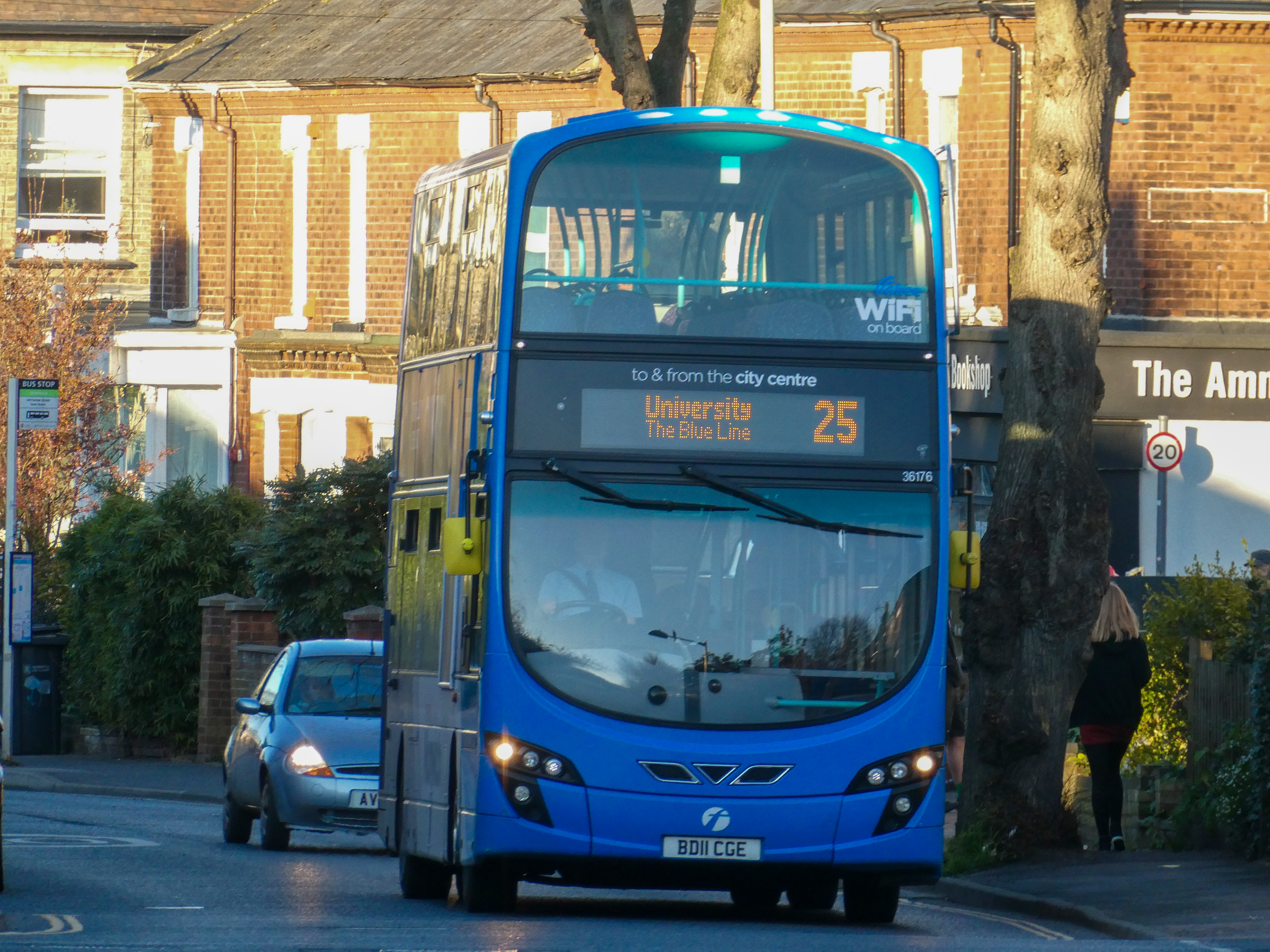
A First Group bus on Unthank Road

Bisecting the Triangle is Unthank Road, which took its name from the family who owned a large estate there in the nineteenth century. The thoroughfare gained its name when William Unthank's son, Clement William Unthank, rode his horse along a sandy lane in order to court his future wife at Intwood. He rode from Heigham House, which had been the home of his father, William Unthank, since 1793. By 1855 Clement William Unthank had inherited Heigham House but moved out to his wife's larger estate at Intwood Hall, a few miles south of the city. The Unthanks owned or leased around 60 acres (figures vary) of land in the parish of Heigham where Heigham House was situated, surrounded by a wooded estate that stretched from present-day Onley Street to around Trinity Street.

The house itself was demolished in 1891 but the Unthank estate had begun to be sold off to builders not long after CW Unthank moved to Intwood – the process continued by his son Clement William Joseph Unthank. Clement William was a solicitor and it was his detailed contracts that ensured the relative uniformity of the Victorian terraces that were built on Unthank land: 'good white brick', for instance, was specified in CW Unthank's restrictive covenants as were the characteristic arches of gauged bricks around the doors. Unthank did not allow anything to project more than 18 inches from the front of the house By contrast, the Eaton Glebe estate specified red brick and allowed projections such as roof dormers and porches. This explains the different streetscapes on opposite sides of Unthank Road. However, the Unthanks had a minority holding of six acres on the north-west side of Unthank Road so not all belonged to the church; this plot was to give rise to Warwick, Dover, Portland and Lincoln Streets. CW Unthank forbade the sale of alcohol from houses on his land but on corner sites allowed the building of public houses such as The Unthank Arms and The York Tavern.

=== Second World War ===
Norwich suffered heavily from bombing during the Baedeker Blitz during April 1942, fortunately many of the large Victorian houses remained, albeit several bombs wiping out whole rows of terraces around the area. Notable examples include 185 Unthank Road onwards, and 180 Earlham Road onwards.

== Politics ==
In May 2016, the majority of residents in the area voted for the Labour Party over the Green Party, increasing Labour's control over City Hall.

== Parks ==
The Golden Triangle contains or is adjacent to three public parks:

- Chapelfield Gardens, on the city side of the inner ring road, opened in 1880. Lined with trees first planted in the 18th century by Sir Thomas Churchman.
- Heigham Park, one of the five registered sites that form part of a set of the city's public parks. The park was opened in 1924 by Captain A Sandys-Winsch. Sandys-Winsch was responsible for planting the goblet-pruned London planes that line major roads including Colman Road and Earlham Road.
- Jenny Lind Park, created in the 1960s after the slum clearances around the badly bombed Vauxhall Street area.
Golden Triangle

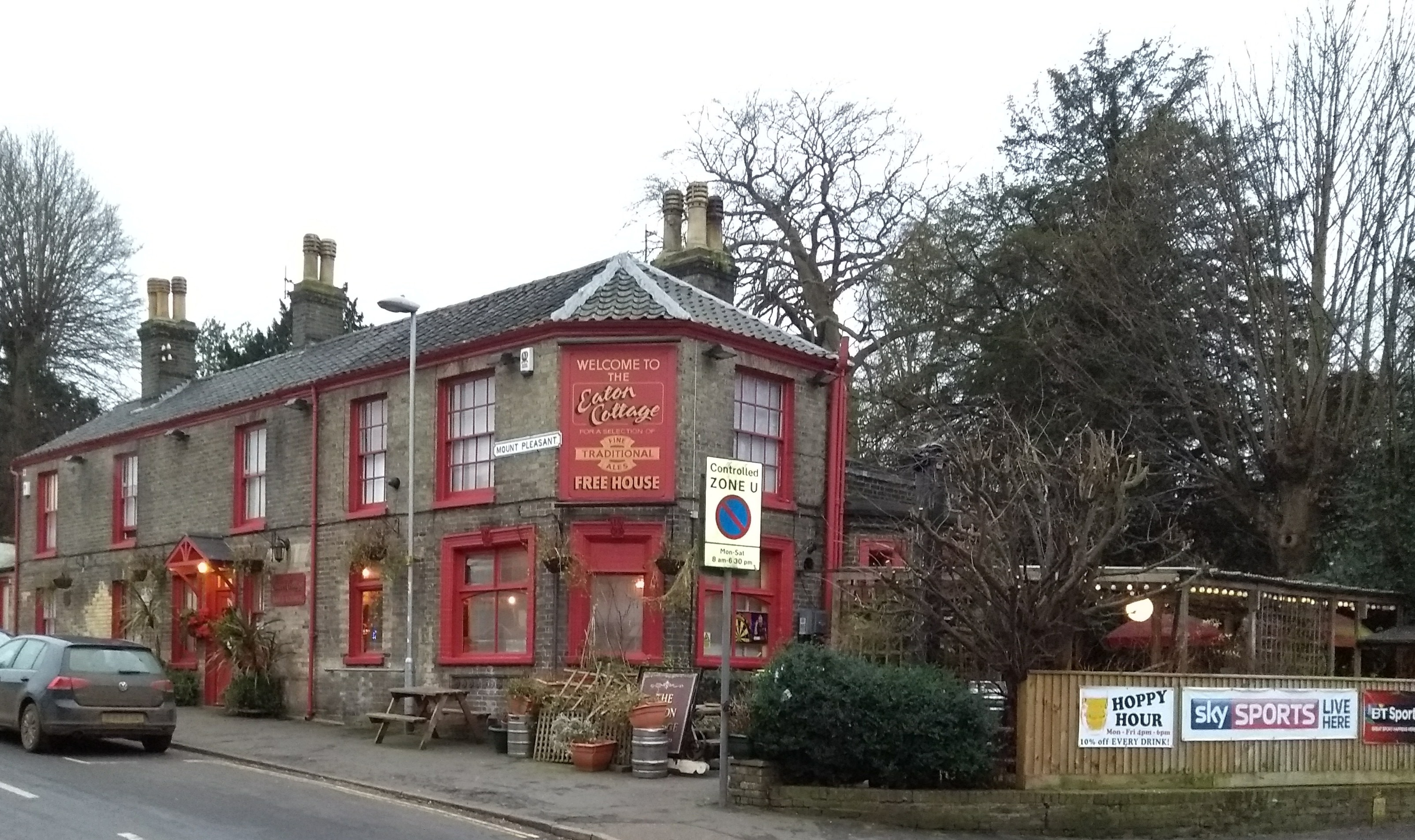
The Eaton Cottage public house, looking toward the city.

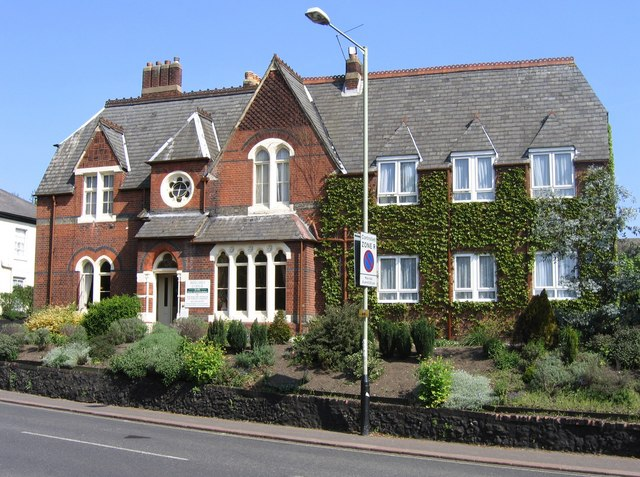
The Beeches Lodge, a former hotel on Unthank Road.

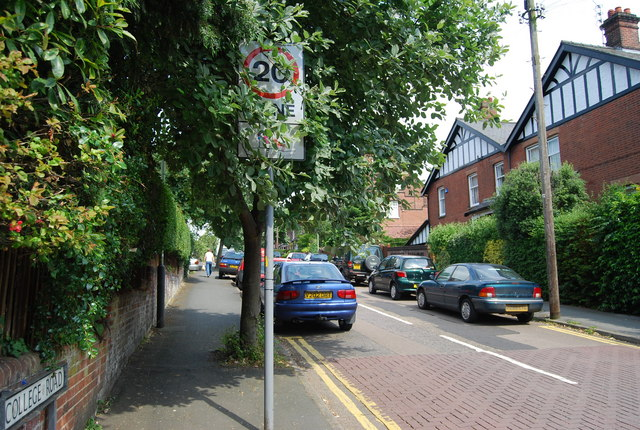
College Road and Unthank Road.

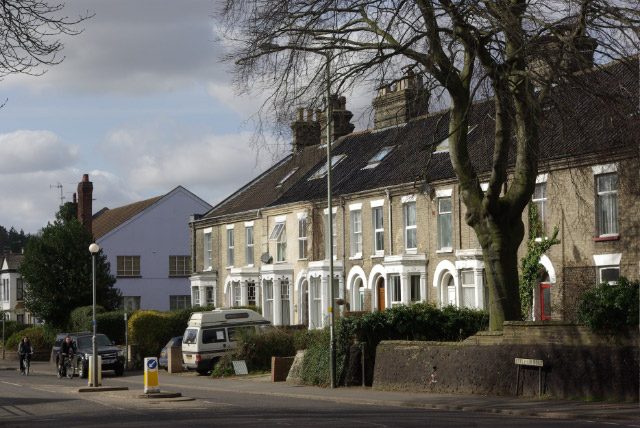
Earlham Road seen from the Heigham Road/Mill Hill Road junction.
