= Marian Arkwright =

English composer

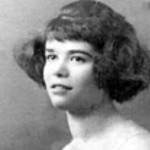
Marian Arkwright

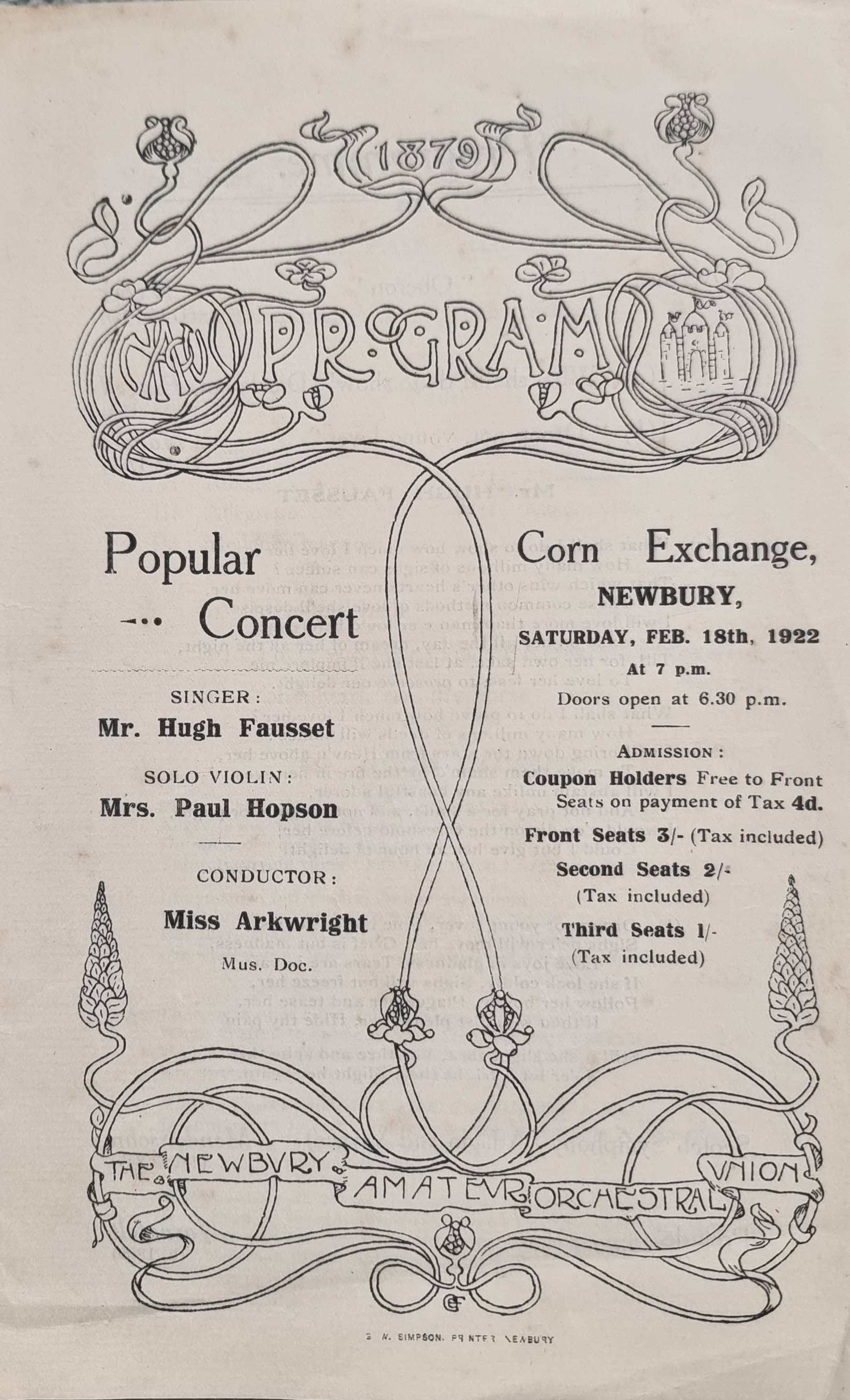
Program of concert conducted by Marian Arkwright shortly before her death

Marian Ursula Arkwright (25 January 1863 – 23 March 1922) was an English composer, pianist and string player (viola and double bass). She was one of the first women in England to earn a Bachelor of Music degree (in 1895), and the first woman to earn a doctorate in music, which she gained in 1913. Arkwright worked as an orchestral musician, composer and conductor, and received a prize for an orchestral work from The Gentlewoman.

== Life ==
Marian Arkwright was born in Norwich, Norfolk, England on 25 January 1863, a descendent of Richard Arkwright, the inventor of the Spinning Jenny. Her brother was the musicologist Godfrey Edward Pellew Arkwright.

Arkwright studied piano with Bernhard Althaus (1831–1917) and also took piano lessons from Charles Hallé. She also studied double bass with Charles Henry Winterbottom and composition with J.S. Liddle, organist at Newbury. She was awarded the L.R.A.M. in 1891, earned a Bachelor of Arts in music at Durham University in 1895, and a doctorate in music at the same university in 1913, making her the first English woman to gain a PhD in music.

After completing her studies, she worked as an orchestral musician and composer and conducted orchestras including the Newbury Amateur Orchestral Union. She served as secretary of the English Ladies' Orchestral Society and the Highclere Choral Society, and was a leader of the Rural Music Schools movement.

In 1906 she received the £25 first prize (Edith Swepstone came second) from The Gentlewoman for an original orchestral work The Winds of the World, inspired by the Kipling ballad ‘The Flag of England’. It was first performed at Newbury in 1907 and repeated in the same year by the Bournemouth Symphony Orchestra, with the composer conducting. Her Melbourne Suite for strings was composed for the 1907 Australian Exhibition of Women's Work.

She died unexpectedly on the 23 March 1922 at Crowshott, Highclere (where she lived with her brother), a few hours after performing in the orchestra for a Newbury Choral Society performance of The Messiah.

== Works ==
Arkwright published three volumes of violin and piano duets and two Concert Pieces for viola and piano. She was noted for unusual instrument combinations. She took an interest in folk music and her Japanese Symphony contained Japanese airs that she had noted down herself, following a trip to Japan with Lucy Broadwood. (It's possible that this work and the Japanese Suite are the same work - a London performance of the "symphonic suite" In Japan was noted in the papers in 1915). Nigel Burton considers her The Dragon of Wantley, a ballad for three voices, to be her best children's work.

Her 1914 Requiem Mass was well received in the early stages of World War 1, though Kate Kennedy has since judged it "jingoistic in the extreme". A more authentic response to the war came later, in Through the Mist, a musical account of the returning of the body of the Unknown Warrior on HMS Verdun in 1920.

Orchestral

- A Blackbird's Matins, concert overture (performed in Cambridge, 1900)
- Hymn of Pan, scena for baritone and orchestra
- Japanese Suite for strings (1911) (aka In Japan?)
- Melbourne Suite for strings (1907)
- Symphony in A minor, The Japanese (before 1912)
- Through the Mist (1920)
- Variations on an air by Handel (fp. Bournemouth, 1897)
- Winds of the World, symphonic suite (fp. Bournemouth, February 1908)

Choral

- Atalanta in Calydon, cantata for soloists, chorus and orchestra
- The Dragon of Wantley, ballad for treble voices, piano and string quartet (1915, published Cary & Co)
- In convertendo, psalm, three part canon
- The Last Rhyme of True Thomas, for chorus with string quartet and piano
- Requiem Mass for chorus and orchestra (1914, published Cary & Co)
- Three Kings from out the Orient, psalm, with bassoon obligato
- Up to those bright and gladsome hills, psalm, two part canon

Operetta

- The Water Babies, based on the book by Charles Kingsley

Chamber music

- Piano and violin duets, Vol. 1, 2 and 3 (published A Cary & Co)
- Quintet for piano, oboe, clarinet, horn and bassoon
- A Retrospect, cello solo
- Rêveries for piano, oboe and viola
- Scherzo and Variations for piano, clarinet and bassoon
- Trio for piano, oboe and horn
- Trio for pianoforte, oboe and viola
- Two concert pieces for viola and piano (published Breitkopf & Hartel)

Song

- Bright is the ring of words (published Cary & Co)
- Children's song (published Cary & Co)
- Come, pretty wag (1897)
- In the midst of the woods, two part song
- The Lark now leaves his watery nest (published Banks & Son, York)
- Renewal, two part song with piano
