= Troilus and Cressida =

Play by William Shakespeare

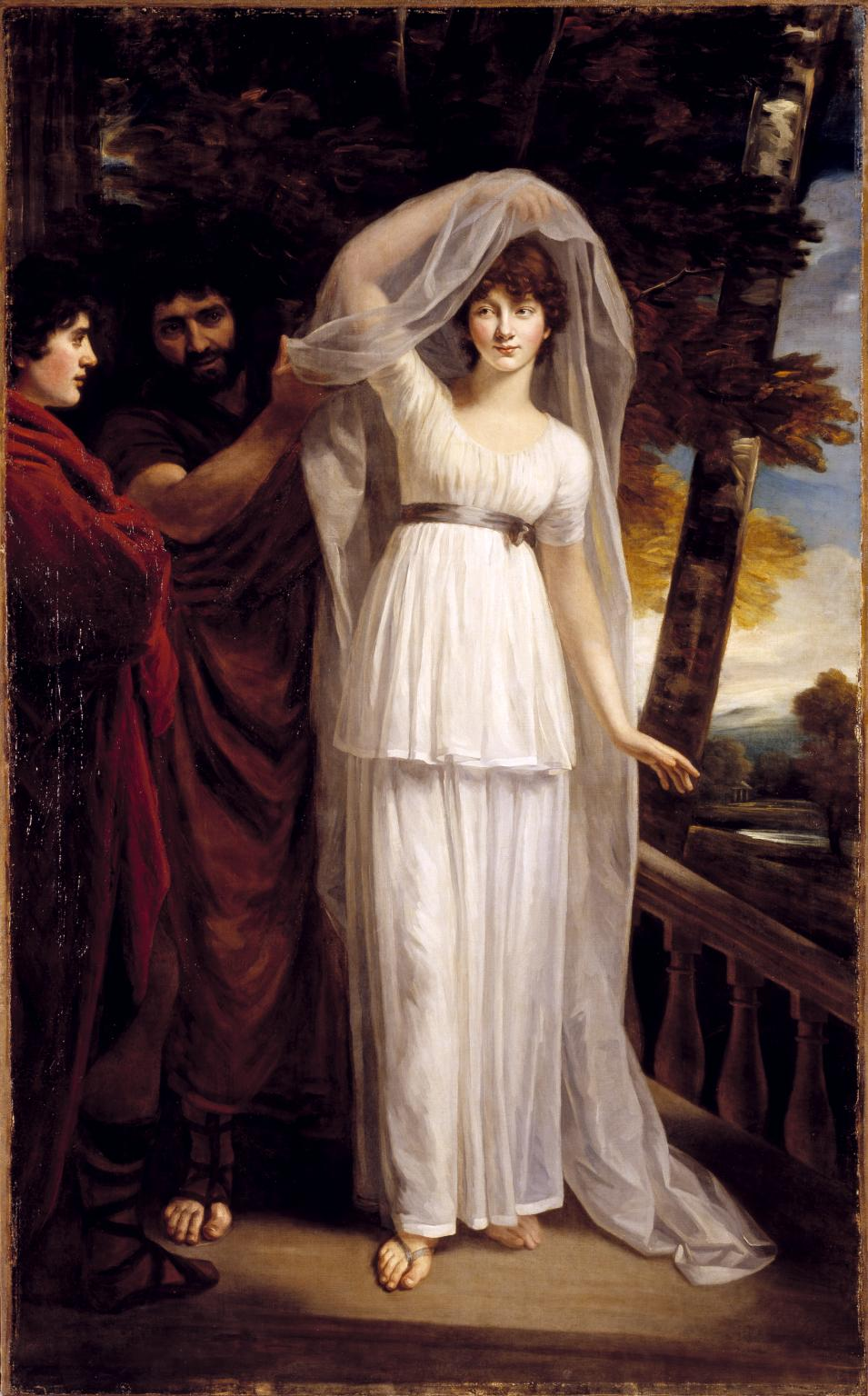
- Portrait of a Lady in the Character of Cressida, John Opie (c. 1800)
- Original language: English
- Written by: William Shakespeare
- Characters: See text
- Series: First Folio
- Subject: Trojan War
- Genre: Shakespearean problem play
- Setting: Troy, Trojan War

The Tragedy (or History) of Troilus and Cressida, often shortened to Troilus and Cressida (/ˈtrɔɪlʌs ... ˈkrɛsɪdə/ or /ˈtroʊ.ɪlʌs/), is a play by William Shakespeare, probably written in 1602.

At Troy during the Trojan War, Troilus and Cressida begin a love affair. Cressida is forced to leave Troy to join her father in the Greek camp. Meanwhile, the Greeks endeavour to lessen the pride of Achilles.

The tone alternates between bawdy comedy and tragic gloom. Readers and theatre-goers have frequently found it difficult to understand how they are meant to respond to the characters. Frederick S. Boas has labelled it one of Shakespeare's problem plays. It is the subject of lively critical debate.

== Characters ==
=== The Trojans ===
- Priam, King of Troy
- Priam's children: Cassandra (a prophetess), Hector, Troilus, Paris, Deiphobus, Helenus, and Margarelon (bastard)
- Andromache, Hector's wife
- Aeneas, a commander and leader
- Antenor, another commander
- Calchas, a Trojan priest who is taking part with the Greeks
- Cressida, Calchas's daughter
- Alexander, servant to Cressida
- Pandarus, Cressida's uncle

=== The Greeks ===
- Agamemnon, King of the Greeks and leader of the Greek invasion
- Achilles, prince
- Ajax, prince
- Diomedes, prince
- Nestor, wise and talkative prince
- Ulysses, King of Ithaca (In some editions, the character is referred to as Odysseus.)
- Menelaus, King of Sparta, brother to Agamemnon
- Helen, wife to Menelaus, living with Paris
- Thersites, a deformed and scurrilous low-class "fool"
- Patroclus, lover of Achilles

== Plot ==
Print, from a painting by E. J. Poynter, in The Graphic Gallery of Shakespeare's Heroines (1896)

=== Synopsis ===
Troilus and Cressida is set during the later years of the Trojan War, faithfully following the plotline of the Iliad from Achilles' refusal to participate in battle to Hector's death. Essentially, two plots are followed in the play. In one, Troilus, a Trojan prince (son of Priam), woos Cressida, another Trojan. They profess their undying love, before Cressida is exchanged for a Trojan prisoner of war. As he attempts to visit her in the Greek camp, Troilus glimpses Diomedes flirting with his beloved Cressida, and decides to avenge her perfidy.

While this plot gives the play its name, it accounts for only a small part of the play's run time. The majority of the play revolves around the leaders of the Greek and Trojan forces, Agamemnon and Priam, respectively. Agamemnon and his cohorts attempt to get the proud Achilles to return to battle and face Hector, who sends the Greeks a letter telling them of his willingness to engage in one-on-one combat with a Greek soldier. Ajax is originally chosen as this combatant, but makes peace with Hector before they are able to fight. Achilles is prompted to return to battle only after his lover Patroclus is killed by Hector before the Trojan walls. A series of skirmishes conclude the play, during which Achilles catches Hector and has the Myrmidons kill him. The conquest of Troy is left unfinished, as the Trojans learn of the death of their hero.

=== Act 1 ===
==== Scene 1 ====
The play opens with a Prologue, an actor dressed as a soldier, who gives the background to the plot, which takes place during the Trojan War. Immortalized in Greek mythology and Homer's Iliad, the war occurs because a Trojan prince, Paris, has stolen the beautiful Helen from her husband, King Menelaus of Sparta, and carried her home to Troy with him. In response, Menelaus gathers his fellow Greek kings, and they sail to Troy hoping to capture the city and reclaim Helen.

Within the walls of Troy, Prince Troilus complains to Pandarus that he is unable to fight because of heartache; he is desperately in love with Pandarus's niece, Cressida. Pandarus complains that he has been doing his best to further Troilus's pursuit of his niece, and that he has received small thanks for his labors. After he departs, Troilus remarks that Pandarus has been growing irritable lately. As he ponders, the Trojan commander Aeneas comes in, bringing news that Paris has been wounded in combat with Menelaus. As the noise of battle comes in offstage, Troilus agrees to join his Trojan comrades on the field.

==== Scene 2 ====
In another part of the city, Cressida converses with her servant, who recounts how a Greek warrior named Ajax, a valiant but stupid man, managed to overcome the great Trojan prince Hector the previous day, and that Hector is fighting furiously because of this defeat. Cressida is joined by Pandarus, and they discuss the Trojan princes, with Pandarus taking the unlikely position that Troilus is a greater man than Hector. As they converse, several Trojan lords pass by them returning from battle, including Antenor, Aeneas, Hector, and Paris; Pandarus praises each one, but tells his niece that none of them can match Troilus. He then leaves Cressida, promising to bring a token from Troilus. Alone, Cressida says that while she returns Troilus's feelings, she is holding him off; she is enjoying his pursuit of her.

==== Scene 3 ====
In the Greek camp, the great general and king Agamemnon is conversing with his lieutenants and fellow kings. He asks why they seem so glum and downcast for although their seven-year siege of Troy has met little success so far, they should welcome the adversity that the long war represents, since only in difficult times can greatness emerge. Nestor, the oldest of the Greek commanders, cites examples of how heroism emerges from hardship. In response, Ulysses expresses his deep respect for what they have said, but points out that the Greek army is facing a crisis not because of the duration of the war, but because of a breakdown in authority within the Greek camp. Instead of being united, they are divided into factions: Achilles refuses to fight, and instead stays in his tent while Patroclus ridicules the Greek commanders; others, like Ajax and his foul-mouthed slave Thersites, follow this example, and so the entire army is corrupted. The others agree that this is a great problem, and as they discuss what is to be done, Aeneas appears under a flag of truce, bringing a challenge from Hector. The Trojan prince offers to fight any Greek lord in single combat, with the honour of their respective wives as the issue. The Greeks agree to find a champion and offer Aeneas hospitality. As Aeneas is led away, Ulysses tells Nestor that this challenge is truly directed at Achilles, since only Achilles could match the great Hector in battle. But to have Achilles fight Hector would be dangerous, because if Achilles lost, it would dishearten the entire army. Therefore, Ulysses suggests, they should have Ajax fight Hector instead; even if Ajax loses, they can still claim that Achilles would have won in his place. At the same time, by choosing Ajax as their champion, they will infuriate Achilles and perhaps goad him into rejoining the war, bringing with him all his soldiers. Nestor, impressed with Ulysses's intelligence, agrees to the plan.

=== Act 2 ===
==== Scene 1 ====
In the Greek camp, Ajax summons his slave, Thersites, and orders him to find out the nature of the proclamation that has just been posted. Thersites, a foul-mouthed ruffian, refuses to obey and instead curses his master and the Greeks with equal vigor, provoking Ajax to beat him. Achilles and Patroclus come upon them and he includes them in his curses. Offended at Patroclus' request he stop, he replies "I will hold my peace when Achilles' brooch bids me, shall I?", the term "in the 16th century meant, among other things, a 'pointed rod, spit or pricker,'" implying that Achilles and Patroclus were lovers. They send him away, and Achilles tells Ajax the news of Hector's challenge to any brave Greek warrior. The selection of the warrior has been put to a lottery otherwise, Achilles says as he leaves, he would have been the only possible choice, a remark that produces a sneer from Ajax.

==== Scene 2 ====
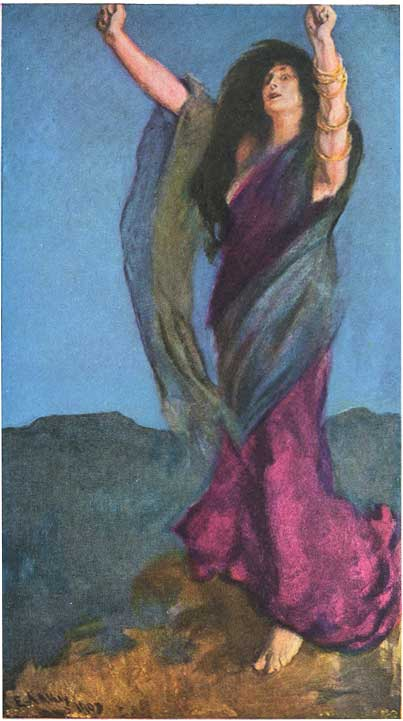
Cassandra, Troilus and Cressida, Edwin Austin Abbey (c. 1908)

In Troy, King Priam and his sons debate the wisdom of continuing the war, when they can end it by returning Helen to the Greeks. Hector, supported by his brother Helenus, argues eloquently that while the theft of Helen may have been a brave act, she cannot be worth the great and bloody price they are paying to keep her. When he is done speaking, his sister Cassandra, a prophetess who is considered mad, dashes in and cries that if they do not let Helen go, Troy will burn. When she is gone, Troilus dismisses her warning as ravings, and argues that they must keep Helen for the sake of their honor and Paris supports him. Hector retorts that this is why young men cannot be trusted to make moral decisions, since passion overwhelms their reason. But Troilus says that Helen is more than a woman, she is a theme of honour and renown, and Hector yields and agrees to continue the war. He goes on to report the challenge that has been sent out to the Greeks, and how he hopes it will bring Achilles to the field.

==== Scene 3 ====
Alone, Thersites sneers at the pretensions of both Ajax and Achilles. When Patroclus and Achilles appear, he calls them fools; Patroclus moves to strike him, but Achilles holds him off. They see the Greek commanders Agamemnon, Ulysses, Nestor, and Diomedes approaching, accompanied by Ajax, and Achilles quickly retires to his tent. When Agamemnon asks to see him, Patroclus tells the general that Achilles is ill. Agamemnon grows angry, but Achilles refuses to emerge, and tells Ulysses, who goes in to see him, that he still refuses to fight the Trojans. Agamemnon suggests that Ajax go in and plead with Achilles, but Ulysses declares that doing so would be insulting to Ajax, and then he, with the other Greek commanders, praises Ajax profusely, saying that he is the best of their warriors. They agree to leave Achilles in his tent, and decide that Ajax will be their champion against Hector the next day.

=== Act 3 ===
==== Scene 1 ====
In Troy, Pandarus converses with a servant while he waits to speak with Paris and Helen. When they come in, he compliments Helen profusely, and asks her to make excuses for Troilus if Priam asks about him at dinner that night. Paris and Helen ask where Troilus will be dining, and Pandarus refuses to tell him but they both guess that he will be in pursuit of Cressida, and they make bawdy jokes about it as they depart to greet the returning warriors.

==== Scene 2 ====
Pandarus finds Troilus pacing about impatiently in an orchard, and assures him that his desire for Cressida will soon be satisfied. He goes out, leaving Troilus giddy with expectation, and brings in Cressida; after urging them to embrace, Pandarus departs. Left alone, they profess their love for one another, and each pledges to be faithful to the other. He reassures her and again pledges to be faithful, declaring that thereafter history will say of all lovers that they were as true as Troilus. Cressida declares that if she ever strays from him, she hopes that people will say of false lovers that they were as false as Cressida. Pandarus declares that if ever the pair prove false, may 'all pitiful goers-between' be called after his name.

==== Scene 3 ====
Meanwhile, in the Greek encampment, Cressida's father, Calchas, who has betrayed Troy in order to join the Greeks, asks the Greek general to grant him a favor. He asks that they exchange the Trojan commander Antenor, for his daughter, so that he might be reunited with her. Agamemnon agrees, and orders Diomedes to supervise the exchange. On Ulysses's advice, the Greek commanders then file past Achilles's tent, and scorn the proud warrior, ignoring his greetings and making him uneasy. He goes to Ulysses and asks him why he is being scorned, and Ulysses tells him that he is no longer a hero and he will be forgotten quickly. He suggests that Achilles could restore his fame and honor if he stopped dallying with enemy women and took the field. When Ulysses is gone, Patroclus tells Achilles to follow Ulysses's advice; seeing that his reputation is at stake, Achilles agrees. Thersites comes in and reports that Ajax is now striding about the camp, completely puffed up with his own importance. Patroclus persuades the foul-mouthed slave to talk Ajax into bringing Hector, safely conducted by Agamemnon, to Achilles' tent after their fight the next day, so that Achilles may speak with Hector.

=== Act 4 ===
==== Scene 1 ====
Diomedes comes to Troy to make the exchange of Antenor for Cressida, and he is greeted heartily by Aeneas and Paris. Aeneas goes to fetch Cressida, remarking that this exchange will deal a heavy blow to Troilus; Paris concurs, but says regretfully that they have no choice: "the bitter disposition of the time will have it so". After Aeneas is gone, Diomedes is asked who he thinks deserves Helen more: Paris, or Menelaus? With great bitterness, the Greek replies that both deserve her, since both are fools, willing to pay a great price in blood for a whore.

==== Scenes 2–3 ====
Meanwhile, as morning breaks, Troilus takes a regretful leave of Cressida while she pleads with him to stay a little longer. Pandarus comes in and makes several bawdy jokes about their recent lovemaking; suddenly, there is a knock at the door, and Cressida hides Troilus in her bedroom. Aeneas enters, and demands that Pandarus fetch Troilus. When the young prince emerges, Aeneas tells him the sad news that Cressida must be sent to her father in the Greek camp. Troilus is distraught, and goes with Aeneas to see his father, Priam, while Pandarus breaks the news to Cressida, who begins to weep.

==== Scene 4 ====
Troilus brings Diomedes, together with the great lords of Troy, to Cressida's house, and begs leave to say goodbye to his lady. When they are alone, he pledges to be faithful, and Cressida promises that even in the Greek camp, she will remain true to him. Then Diomedes is brought in, and Troilus demands that he "use her well...for, by the dreadful Pluto, if thou dost not, Though the great bulk Achilles be thy guard, I'll cut thy throat" (4.4.124–129). Diomedes retorts that he will make no promises but will treat Cressida as she deserves, not because any Trojan prince orders him to. At that moment, a trumpet sounds, calling them all to the Greek camp for the duel between Hector and Ajax.

==== Scene 5 ====
In the Greek camp, the newly arrived Cressida is greeted by all the Greek commanders. Ulysses insists that she be kissed by everyone, only then refusing to kiss her himself and when she is gone, he declares that she is a loose, unvirtuous woman. Then the Trojan lords arrive, and the conditions of the duel are set by Aeneas, who remarks that since Ajax and Hector are related, Hector's whole heart will not be in this fight. As the two combatants prepare, Agamemnon asks Ulysses "what Trojan is that same that looks so heavy" (4.5.113.1). Ulysses tells his general that the downcast Trojan is Troilus, and then goes on to praise him profusely, saying that Troilus may even be a greater man than Hector.

=== Act 5 ===
==== Scene 1 ====
Achilles boasts to Patroclus how he will kill Hector. The two encounter Thersites, who delivers a letter to Achilles, and then unloads his usual torrent of abuse on them, calling Patroclus Achilles' male varlot, his 'masculine whore', and on the entire campaign. The letter is from the Trojan princess, Polyxena, whom Achilles loves, and it begs him not to fight the next day; he tells Patroclus sadly that he must obey her wishes. They go out, and Thersites remains; he watches from the shadows as the feast breaks up. Most of the lords go to bed, but Diomedes slips off to see Cressida, and Ulysses and Troilus follow him. Noting that Diomedes is an untrustworthy, lustful rogue, Thersites follows him as well.

==== Scene 2 ====
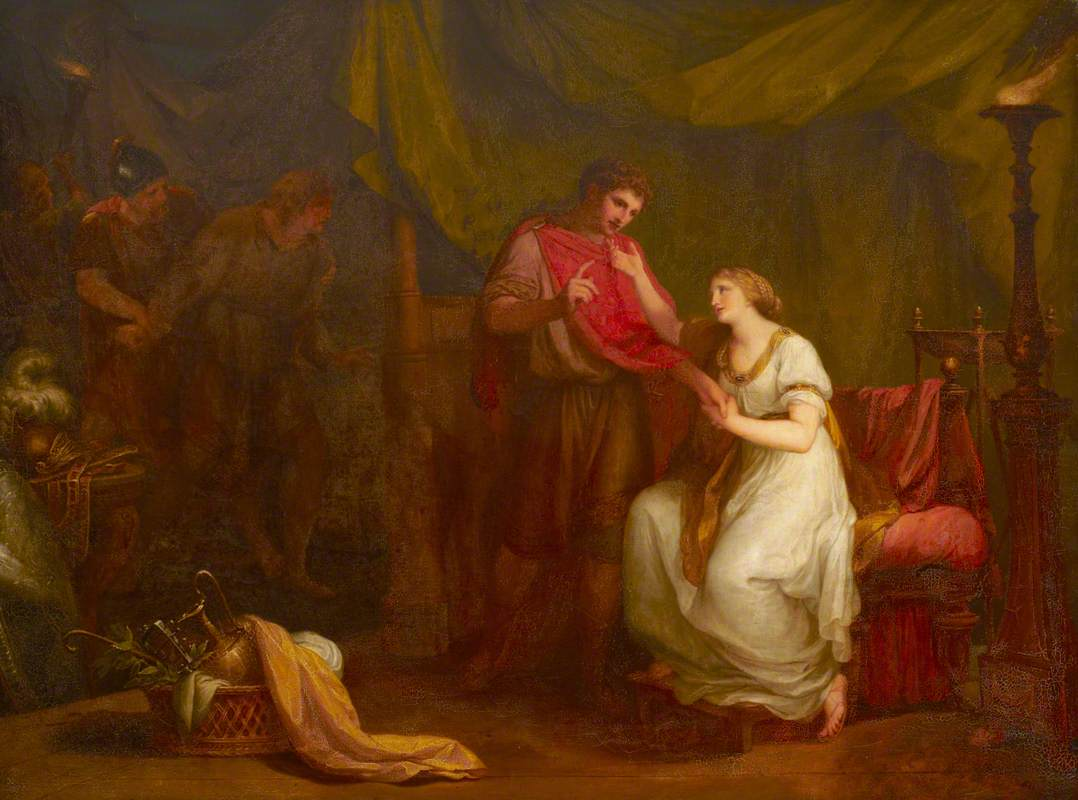
Diomed and Cressida (from William Shakespeare's 'Troilus and Cressida', Act V, scene ii), Angelika Kauffmann (1789)

At Calchas's tent, Diomedes calls to Cressida. Her father fetches her, while Troilus and Ulysses watch from one hiding place and Thersites from another. With Thersites's profanity and Troilus's shock providing a counterpoint, Diomedes woos Cressida, who behaves reluctantly but coyly toward his advances, fending him off for a time but never allowing him to leave. Eventually, she gives him a sleeve that Troilus presented to her as a love-token then she takes it back, and says that she never wants to see Diomedes again, but then softens, gives it to him once more, and promises to wait for him later, when he will come to sleep with her. When she is gone, and Diomedes too, Troilus is in agony, first denying the evidence seen with his own eyes, and then pledging to find Diomedes on the field of battle and kill him. Finally, as morning nears, Aeneas arrives to lead him back to Troy.

==== Scene 3 ====
Hector girds for battle while his wife Andromache and his sister Cassandra plead with him not to go. Both have had dreams that prophesy his death, but he dismisses their warnings. Troilus comes in and says that he will be fighting too; indeed, he chides Hector for having been too merciful to his enemies in the past, saying that today Troilus plans to slay as many men as he can. Cassandra leads Priam in, and the old king pleads with his son not to fight, saying that he too feels foreboding about this day, but Hector refuses to listen and goes out to the battlefield. Pandarus brings Troilus a letter from Cressida; Troilus tears it up and follows Hector out to the field.

==== Scene 4 ====
As the battle rages, Thersites wanders the field, escaping death by brazen cowardice.

==== Scene 5 ====
Another part of the plains, Agamemnon summarises the ways the Greeks are doing badly in the battle, including that Doreus is taken prisoner and Patroclus probably slain. Then Nestor enters and says that "There is a thousand Hectors in the field" (5.5.20) The scene ends with Achilles asking where Hector is.

==== Scene 6 ====
Troilus calls Diomedes a traitor for capturing his horse. Diomedes, Ajax and Troilus exit, fighting.

Hector spares the unprepared Achilles, who boasts that Hector was simply fortunate to find him unarmed. Hector sees a Greek in ornate armour and pursues him.

==== Scene 7 ====
In another part of the plains, Menelaus and Paris enter the scene fighting. Thersites is confronted by a bastard son of Priam, but declares that as he is himself a bastard they have no business fighting each other.

==== Scene 8 ====
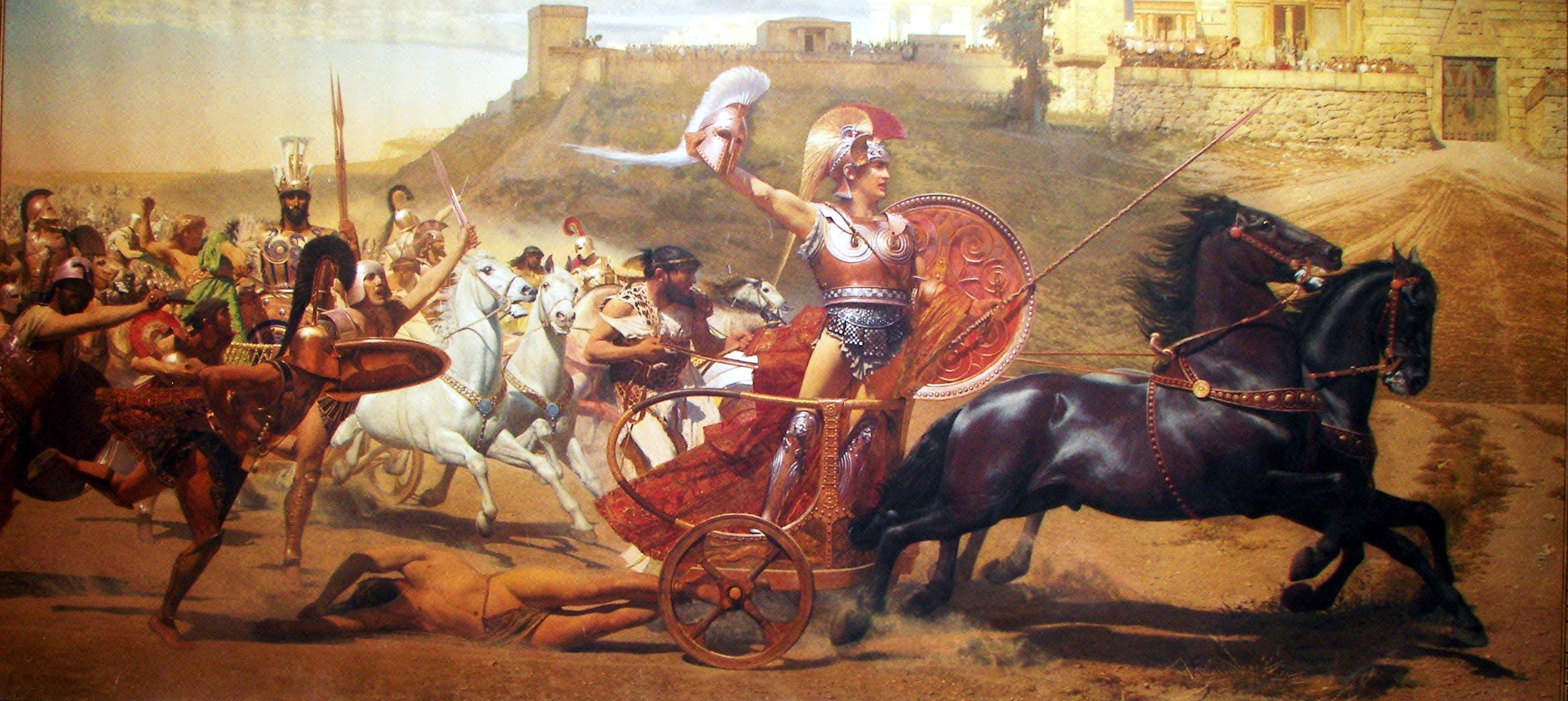
Triumph of Achilles, Franz Matsch (1892)

Achilles and his men find Hector, who has finished fighting and taken off his armour in order to try on the golden armour of the warrior he has conquered. Surrounding the unarmed Trojan, they stab him to death.

==== Scene 9 ====
Agamenon, Ajax, Menelaus, Nestor, Diomedes and others enter marching. Word spreads among the Greeks of the death of Hector.

==== Scene 10 ====
An embittered Troilus informs the Trojans of Hector's death, and curses Pandarus. Left alone on the stage, the unhappy Pandarus wonders why he should be so abused, when his services were so eagerly desired only a little while before.

== Sources ==
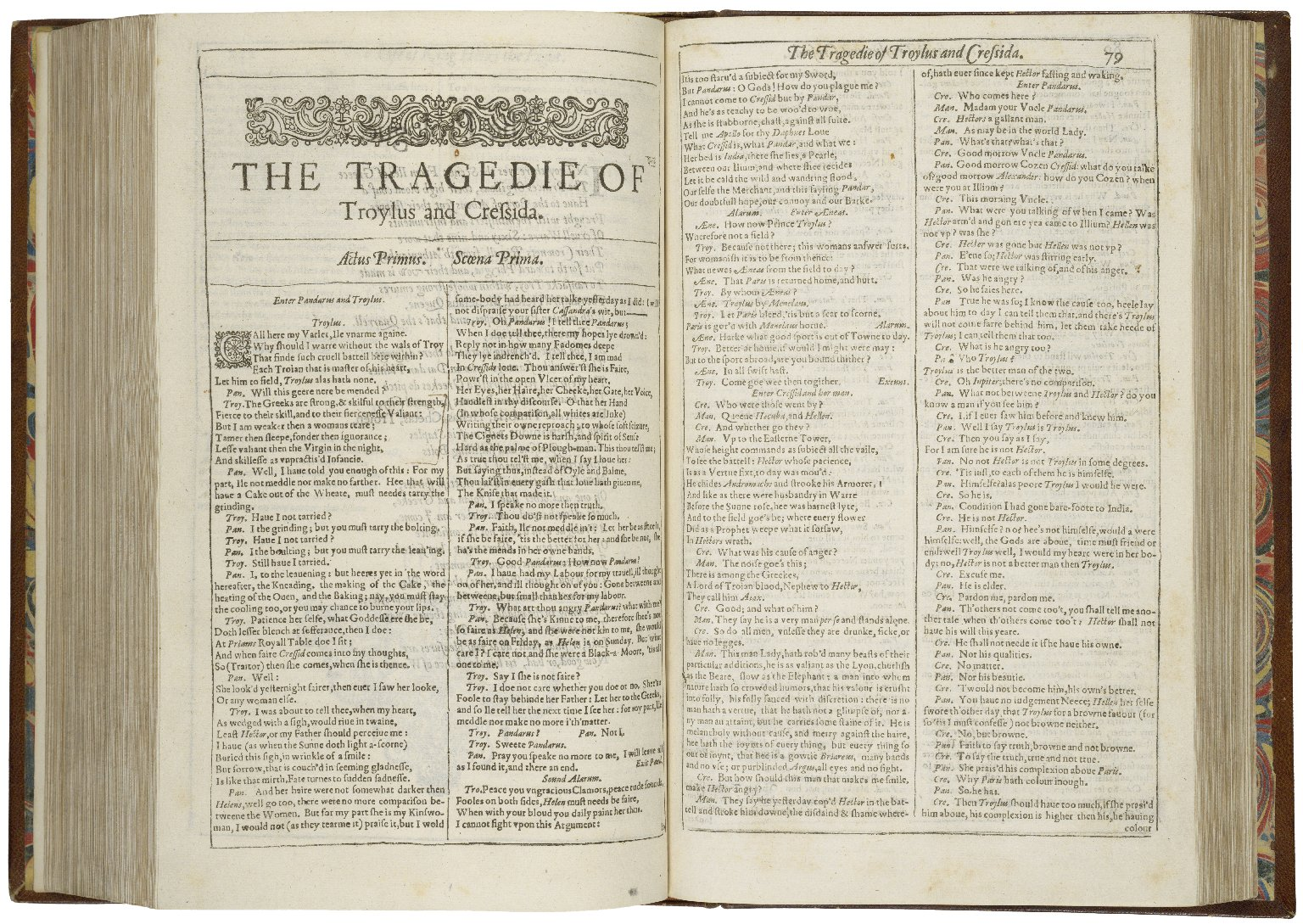
The first page of Troilus and Cressida, printed in the First Folio of 1623.

The story of the persuasion of Achilles into battle is drawn from Homer's Iliad (perhaps in the translation by George Chapman), and from various medieval and Renaissance retellings, whereas the story of Troilus and Cressida is a medieval chivalric romance that is not part of Greek mythology.

Shakespeare drew on a number of sources for this plotline, in particular Chaucer's version of the tale, Troilus and Criseyde, but also John Lydgate's Troy Book and Caxton's translation of the Recuyell of the Historyes of Troye.

The two storylines of Troilus and Cressida—the love story of the title characters, and the warfare mainly around Hector, Ajax and Achilles—have completely different origins. While the warfare is of ancient origins and is at the core of the Troy saga in the Homeric epics, especially the Iliad, the story of Troilus and Cressida is part of the narrative material of the Middle Ages: it does not come from Greek mythology, but belongs to the narrative motifs found in the medieval retelling of popular material.

At its first appearance, somewhen between 1155 and 1160, this new storyline is an embellishment by Benoît de Sainte-Maure in his Roman de Troie, which was written for the court of King Henry Plantagenet as a kind of "prince mirror". For his part, Benoît extended stories from Dictys Cretensis and Dares Phrygius from the late Roman period, which entwine around the Iliad material, with his own romantic sub-plot. The Roman de Troie was in turn a source for Boccaccio's "Il Filostrato", which was the main source for Chaucer's poetry Troilus and Criseyde (c. 1380); Shakespeare knew Chaucer's works very well. Other versions of the material, such as John Lydgate's "Troy Book" and Caxton's "Recuyel of the History of Troy", were at the time of Shakespeare in England in circulation and probably known to him.

The story was a popular one for dramatists in the early 17th century and Shakespeare may have been inspired by contemporary plays. Thomas Heywood's two-part play The Iron Age also depicts the Trojan War and the story of Troilus and Cressida, but it is not certain whether his or Shakespeare's play was written first. In addition, Thomas Dekker and Henry Chettle wrote a play called Troilus and Cressida at around the same time as Shakespeare, but this play survives only as a fragmentary plot outline.

== Date and text ==
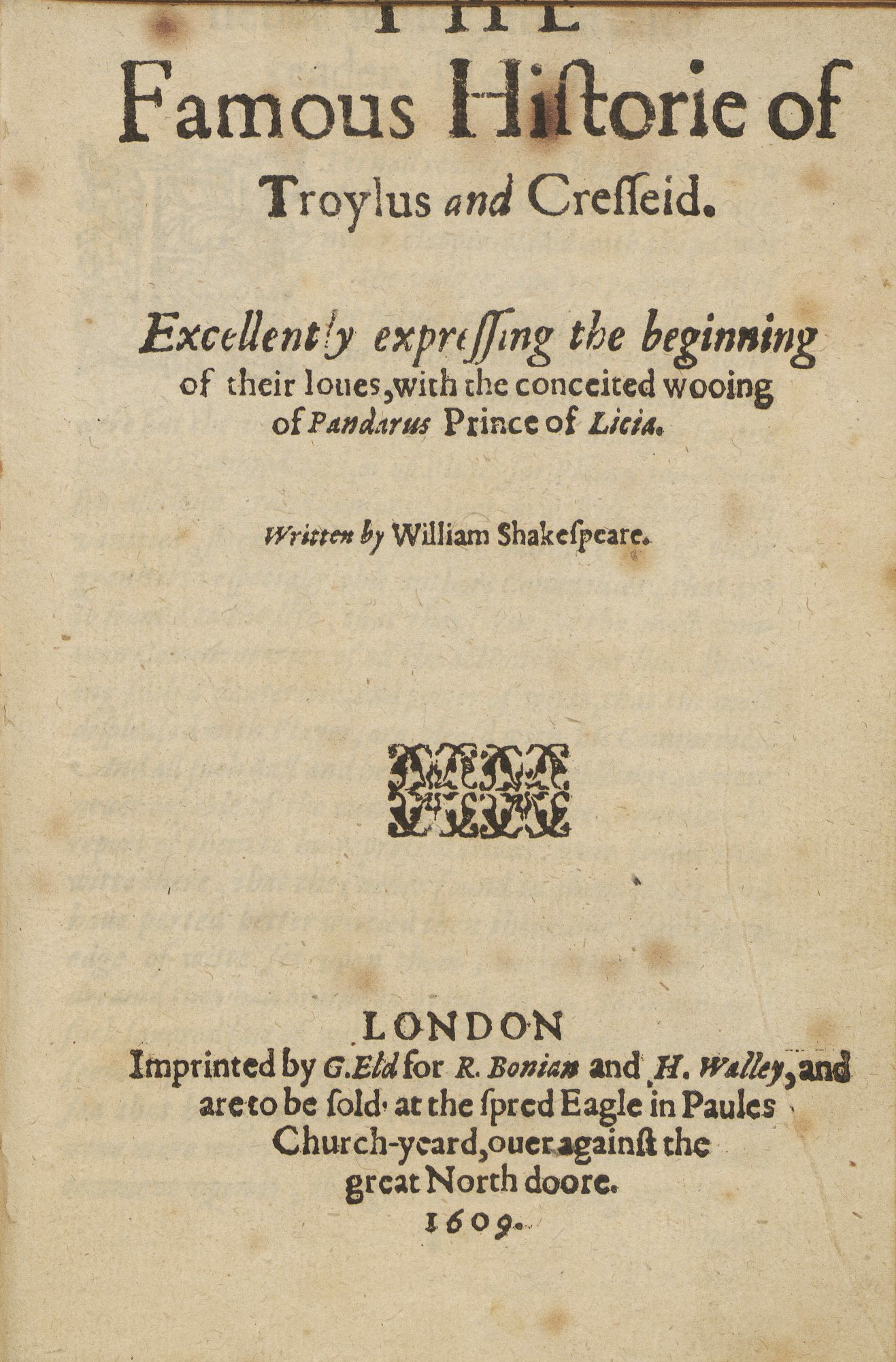
Title page, 1609 quarto edition

The play is believed to have been written around 1602, shortly after the completion of Hamlet. It was published in quarto in two separate editions, both in 1609. It is not known whether the play was ever performed in its own time, because the two editions contradict each other: One announces on the title page that the play had been recently performed on stage; the other claims in a preface that it is a new play that has never been staged.

The play was entered into the Register of the Stationers' Company on 7 February 1603, by the bookseller and printer James Roberts, with a mention that the play was acted by the Lord Chamberlain's Men, Shakespeare's company. Publication followed in 1609; the stationers Richard Bonian and Henry Walley re-registered the play on 28 January 1609, and later that year issued the first quarto, but in two "states". The first says the play was "acted by the King's Majesty's servants at the Globe"; the second version omits the mention of the Globe Theatre, and prefaces the play with a long epistle that claims that Troilus and Cressida is "a new play, never staled with the stage, never clapper-clawed with the palms of the vulgar".

Some commentators (like Georg Brandes, the Danish Shakespeare scholar of the late 19th century) have attempted to reconcile these contradictory claims by arguing that the play was composed originally around 1600–1602, but heavily revised, possibly by another hand, shortly before its 1609 printing. The play is noteworthy for its bitter and caustic nature, similar to the works that Shakespeare was writing in the 1605–1608 period, King Lear, Coriolanus, and Timon of Athens. In this view, the original version of the play was a more positive romantic comedy of the type Shakespeare wrote ca. 1600, like As You Like It and Twelfth Night, while the later revision injected the darker material – leaving the result a hybrid jumble of tones and intents.

The Quarto edition labels it a history play with the title The Famous Historie of Troylus and Cresseid, but the First Folio classed it with the tragedies, under the title The Tragedie of Troylus and Cressida. The confusion is compounded by the fact that in the original pressing of the First Folio, the play's pages are unnumbered, the title is not included in the Table of Contents, and it appears to have been squeezed between the histories and the tragedies. Based on this evidence, scholars believe it was a very late addition to the Folio, and therefore may have been added wherever there was room.

== Analysis and criticism ==
The difficulties surrounding the date of the play are insignificant compared with the difficulties of its genre identification.

The famous 19th century literary critic Frederick S. Boas argued that Troilus and Cressida (along with Measure for Measure and All's Well That Ends Well), deserves its own special category: "Problem Play." The term problem play was drawn from the socially conscious drama of playwrights contemporaneous with Boas, like Ibsen and Shaw, and describes a play centred on a social or political problem in such a way as to promote debate but not easy resolution. Yet the deep sense of Troilus and Cressida, according to Anthony B. Dawson, lies exactly in its perplexity: "It is still full of puzzles, but that fact has been recognized as a virtue rather than a defect – its difficulties are generative, its obstacles fruitful".

Jonathan Bate is one of many modern authors who regard the play as a satire, deliberately undermining the heroic and romantic style of George Chapman's new and popular translation of Homer. He instances the cynical attitude of Pandarus towards the overnight tryst arranged between the lovers, and the weak, "feminine" language of the supposedly valiant warriors. The warrior in magnificent armour delivering the prologue to the play may have been a parody of Ben Jonson's Poetaster.

Although positioned between the Histories and the Tragedies in the First Folio, the editors' initial intention was for it to follow The Tragedy of Romeo and Juliet, placing it unequivocally with the tragedies it resembles, notwithstanding the lack of typical tragic plot structure. It was only a delay in the typesetting process which caused it to be "slotted in" after The Famous History of Henry VIII, when the volume was finally published. Nowadays Troilus and Cressida is often grouped with the so-called "problem comedies" with Measure for Measure and All's Well That Ends Well. Throughout this work we can observe Shakespeare's tone changing from light comic to intensely tragic.

Literary critic and scholar Joyce Carol Oates wrote that in reality these shifts complemented the values Shakespeare questioned in the play: love, honour, and hierarchy. To Oates Troilus and Cressida is one of the most intriguing plays ever written, and in her opinion appears remarkably 'modern'. Oates considered the play a new kind of contemporary tragedy – a grand existential statement:

Troilus and Cressida, that most vexing and ambiguous of Shakespeare's plays, strikes the modern reader as a contemporary document – its investigation of numerous infidelities, its criticism of tragic pretensions, above all, its implicit debate between what is essential in human life and what is only existential are themes of the twentieth century. ... This is tragedy of a special sort – the "tragedy" the basis of which is the impossibility of conventional tragedy.

== Performance history ==
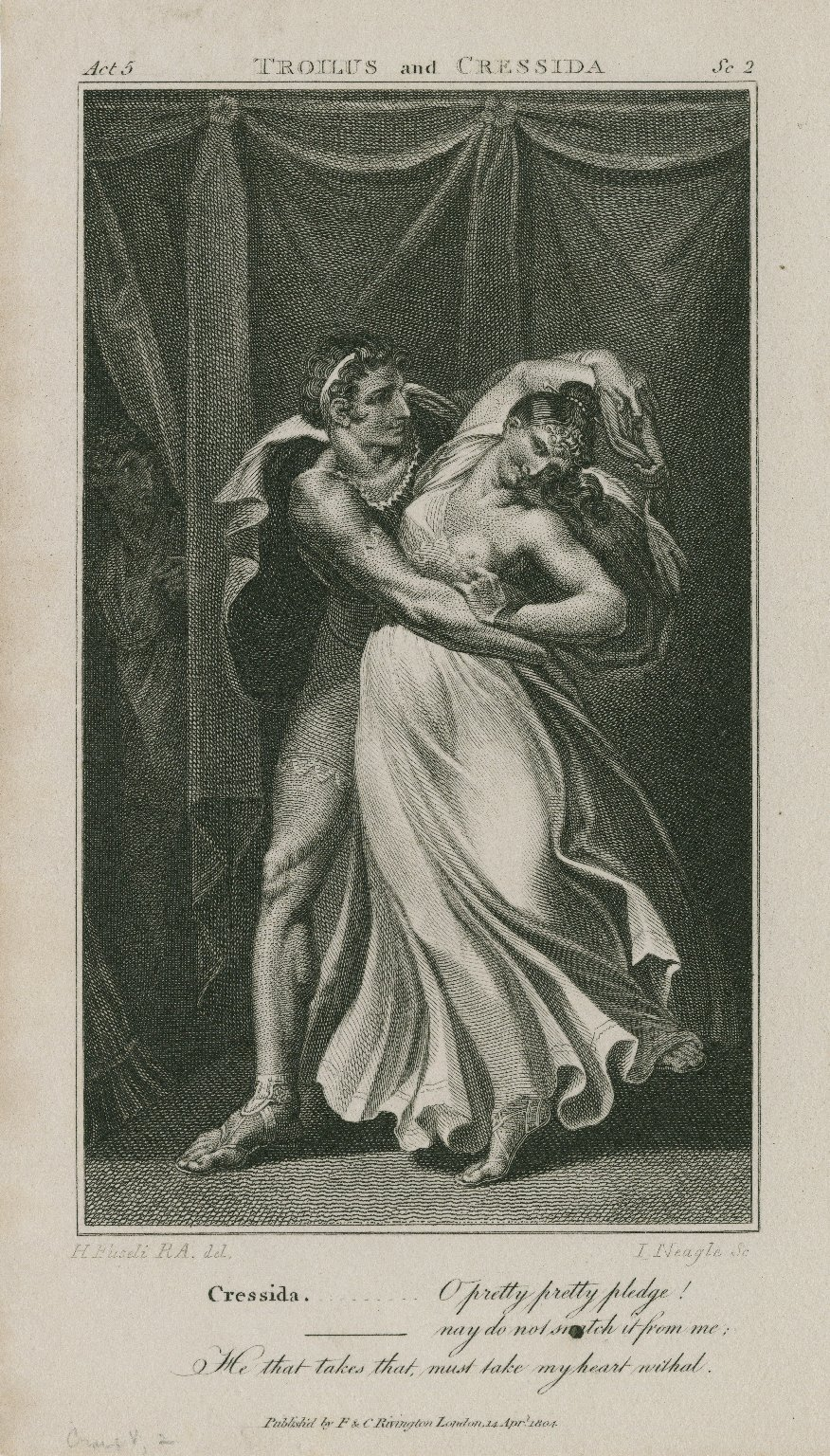
An 1804 print based on a Henry Fuseli painting of Act V, Scene II: Cressida and Diomedes flirt.

Being composed around 1602, the play was most probably staged between 1602 and 1603, as the Stationers' Register entry for 1602/3 records a public performance by the Chamberlain's Men. Taking into account the fact that the second public printing of the quarto edition (1609) dropped the first's familiar testimonial "as acted by the King's Majesty's Servant's at the Globe", it has been suggested that work was performed only once. Instead, the volume was recommended for the libraries of the "eternal reader".

Public performances through history seem sparse. In 1679 John Dryden "new modell'd the plot", re-ordered the scenes, and presented the work as The Truth Found Too Late at the Duke's Theatre, London. In 1795 John Philip Kemble prepared an acting version which emphasised the warriors and sidelined Cressida, but he abandoned the production before opening night. Henry Irving, actor-manager of the Lyceum Theatre, London, commissioned a new version in 1889 but he did not stage it.

Since then, it has become increasingly popular. Peter Holland of Cambridge University attributes this to the work's relevance at times of impending war: William Poel's 1912 production served as a warning as the Great Powers of Europe armed themselves for conflict and Michael Macowan's modern dress production of 1938 at the Westminster Theatre coincided with the Munich crisis. In the international production at the Swan Theatre, Stratford of August 2012 the depiction of Thersites as a wounded war veteran, and the manner in which the Myrmidons killed Hector, "resonat[ed] with […] the ongoing wars in Iraq and Afghanistan."

In comparison to the performance history of other, more frequently performed plays, the delayed acceptance of Troilus and Cressida into the theatre also means that the claims of relevance become especially acute. When the play had been chosen for performance during the twentieth century, while being out of fashion before, it showed that there was something about its themes and subject matter which was familiar in the mindset of the contemporary audience. Colin Chambers characterised the mood of that period thus: There were signs that British theatre was beginning to reconnect to its society, having previously failed, in Peter Hall's words, "to take into account the fact that we have had a World War […] and that everything in the world has changed – values, ways of living, ideals, hopes and fears". Theatre was staking its claim as a cultural force of significance.

As Barbara Bowen points out: 'We see the play as modern partly because we have so little history of premodern readers seeing the play'.

The play can be seen as a metaphorical mirror, reflecting contemporary issues and political concerns. For example: John Barton, during his preparation for the 1968 Royal Shakespeare Company production, saw the parallels between the prolonged war in Viet Nam and the stalemated siege of Troy as offering a way into the script, commenting that: "The basic situation […] is ludicrous, but also an insoluble impasse where both sides are inexorably committed." This was not referenced on stage, however, where the "wars and lechery" of the play (Act 5 scene 2) were shown in the context of the new sexual freedoms of the late nineteen-sixties.

=== Modern revivals ===
The BBC broadcast a modern-language and modern-dress version by Ian Dallas as The Face of Love in 1954, which was then staged by RADA at the Vanbrugh Theatre in 1956, providing Albert Finney with his first lead stage role.

In July 2009, the Hudson Shakespeare Company of New Jersey presented a production as part of their annual Shakespeare in the Parks series. Director Jon Ciccarelli set the action in ancient Greece but sought to put a modern twist on the action by comparing the title pair to Romeo and Juliet and posing the question: would their relationship have lasted if they had lived? Ciccarelli hypothesized that Shakespeare knew the answer and that it was that it would have not. He stated that Troilus and Cressida pine for each other, like their more famous counterparts, and share a passionate evening, the morning after which Troilus is eager to leave. Cressida is later exiled from Troy and quickly takes up with another man proving love is fickle and fleeting. Other notable departures show that the Greek heroes are anything but heroic, showing Shakespeare satirized revered figures like Achilles as childish and barbaric, and sympathized with the pragmatic Hector.

The Public Theater in New York has produced three revivals, in 1965, 1995, and 2016.

In 2012, the Royal Shakespeare Company and the Wooster Group co-presented a controversial collaborative production in Stratford-upon-Avon, wherein each company handled one side of the conflict. Elizabeth LeCompte directed the scenes featuring the Trojans, dressed as 1800s Native Americans, with American actors Scott Shepherd as Troilus and Marin Ireland as Cressida. Mark Ravenhill directed the scenes featuring the Greeks, dressed as contemporary soldiers, with British actors Danny Webb as Agamemmnon and Diomedes, Joe Dixon as Achilles, Scott Handy as Ulysses, and Zubin Varla as Thersites.

Owen Horsley's Shakespeare's Globe production in October 2025 had a bawdy comedy tilt and dual (or multiple) role assignments.

Toronto's Shakespeare Bash'd company staged a version of the play January - February 2026 at the BMO Incubator Theatre Centre on Queen Street West. The production used multiple role assignments and gender flipping (Ulysses was female).

== Literary and cultural references ==
The siege of Troy was one of the popular literary subjects in England circa 1600 and was among the most important events in world history for the contemporaries of Shakespeare. An abundance of allusions in Shakespeare's complete works show that Shakespeare felt able to assume his audience would be aware of this narrative material. In addition, from the records of Philip Henslowe, at least two lost dramas on this subject are known.

Translations of the Iliad were made in Greek, Latin and French in Elizabethan England; moreover, Shakespeare's contemporary George Chapman also prepared an English version. Shakespeare probably knew the Iliad through Chapman's translation and may have drawn on it for some of the parts of his play, but Shakespeare probably also drew on medieval and post-medieval traditions.

In the traditions of Middle English literature, the material was presented on the one hand in a knightly courtly form, but on the other hand increasingly transformed in a negative-critical way. Above all, the image of Cressida changed in the course of the 16th century, so that at the turn of the century Troilus and Cressida had become increasingly included in infidelity and falsity and the name Pandarus became used as a synonym for procurers ("pander").

Accordingly, Shakespeare's arrangement of events and figures is part of a longer tradition of transforming and, in particular, detracting from the established narrative material. Almost all the characters prove unworthy of their legendary reputation. In his drama, Shakespeare does not simply intensify these negative tendencies, but links and superimposes contradictory characterizations in order to make his characters interesting and accessible to his audience. The play's lack of popularity in the playhouse indicates that in this he was unsuccessful.

== See also ==
- List of idioms attributed to Shakespeare

== Sources ==
- Antonelli, Roberto (1980). The birth of Criseyde, an exemplary triangle : classical Troilus and the question of love at the Anglo-Norman court. Oxford: Clarendon Press. OCLC 949248572.
- Boitani, Paolo (1989). The European Tragedy of Troilus. Oxford, UK: Clarendon Press. pp. 21–48.
- Bullough, Geoffrex (1957). Narrative and Dramatic Sources of Shakespeare. Columbia University Press. ISBN 0-231-08891-4.
- Gelfert, Hans-Dieter (2014). William Shakespeare in his Time. Munich, DE: C.H. Beck Verlag. p. 333. ISBN 978-3-406-65919-5.
- Godshalk, W.L. (1995). "The texts of Troilus and Cressida". Early Modern Literary Studies. 2 (1.2): 1–54.
- Ide, Richard S. (1980). Possessed with greatness : the heroic tragedies of Chapman and Shakespeare. Chapel Hill: University of North Carolina Press. ISBN 0-8078-1429-6.
- Jensen, Phebe (1995). "The textual politics of Troilus and Cressida". Shakespeare Quarterly. 46 (4): 414–423. doi:10.2307/2870980. JSTOR 2870980.
- Oates, Joyce Carol (Spring 1966). "The tragedy of existence: Shakespeare's Troilus and Cressida [part 1]". Shakespeare Quarterly.
  Oates, Joyce Carol (Spring 1967). "The tragedy of existence: Shakespeare's Troilus and Cressida [part 2]". Philological Quarterly.
- Palmer, Kenneth (1982). Troilus and Cressida. The Arden Shakespeare, Second Series. London, UK: Methuen. ISBN 0-416-17790-5.
- Reichert, Klaus (1998). "Troilus and Cressida, or the contaminated world". In Reichert, Klaus (ed.). The foreign Shakespeare. Munich, DE: Hanser. pp. 191–197. ISBN 3-446-19498-3.
- Rosenblum, Joseph (2005). The Greenwood Companion to Shakespeare. Vol. 2. London, UK: Greenwood Press. pp. 566–585.
- Rossiter, A.P. (1985). Troilus and Cressida. Shakespeare Tragedies. New York, NY: Chelsea House.
- Smith, Emma (2012). The Cambridge Shakespeare Guide. Cambridge, UK: Cambridge University Press. pp. 190–194. ISBN 978-0-521-14972-3.
- Suerbaum, Ulrich (2015). The Shakespeare Guide (3rd rev. ed.). Ditzingen: Reclam. pp. 166–171. ISBN 978-3-15-020395-8.
- Wells, Stanley; Taylor, Gary (1987). William Shakespeare: A textual companion. Oxford, UK: Oxford University Press. ISBN 0-393-31667-X.
