= Walter Nugent Monck =

English theatre director

Walter Nugent Monck CBE (1878–1958) was an English theatre director and founder of Maddermarket Theatre, Norwich.

He was born in Welshampton, Shropshire, the son of George Gustavus Monck (1849–1920), vicar of Welshampton who later worked as a priest in Liverpool. The son was educated there and at the Royal Academy of Music. In 1895, he abandoned his study of the violin in favour of acting. After some years with a regional touring company, he premiered in London in Bjørnstjerne Bjørnson's Beyond Human Power at the Royalty Theatre in 1901.

That same year, Monck met William Poel, who would profoundly influence Monck's career. By 1902 Monck was stage manager for the Elizabethan Stage Society, learning to direct in Poel's revolutionary manner. In 1909, he directed a series of historical tableaus at St. Andrew's Hall, Norwich. Thenceforth, his career centered on Norwich, although he occasionally returned to London, as he did in 1910 to manage Poel's production of The Two Gentlemen of Verona at His Majesty's Theatre. From 1910, he produced a series of masques at Blickling Hall.

In 1911, he directed an amateur production of The Countess Cathleen which was seen by Yeats; Yeats subsequently invited Monck to become temporary director of the Abbey Theatre while Yeats and the main company toured the United States.

The same year, Monck formed a troupe of amateur players to produce mystery plays and morality plays. Out of this troupe came the Shakespearean company that, a decade later (after World War I service in the Royal Army Medical Corps), Monck housed in a renovated Catholic chapel which had once served as a baking powder factory. Monck named his theatre after the adjoining Church of Saint John the Baptist, Maddermarket, Norwich. Madder (now known commercially as rose madder) is a plant that since medieval times had been used to dye Norwich cloth. Originally seating 220, the theater was expanded in 1953 to seat 324. Audiences viewed plays staged on a replica of a Renaissance stage, the first such permanent stage since before the English Restoration.

On this stage, Monck and his company kept up a steady stream of performance. The repertory, which changed at a rate of one per month, included all of Shakespeare's work, of course, as well as numerous other Renaissance plays and many modern works. By the early 1950s, he had produced over 200 plays. Despite his isolation from London, he was among the more influential mid-century producers. From the mid-30s on, he occasionally directed in London and Stratford. These productions included a Pericles, Prince of Tyre with Paul Scofield in 1947; Cymbeline at the Shakespeare Memorial Theatre in 1946; and King Lear in London in 1953.

Monck retired from his positions in 1952, but he remained intermittently active with the company until his death in 1958.

While generally considered less innovative and less imaginative than Poel, Monck was an influential director both for directors and for scholars. For directors, he continued Poel's destruction of the legacy of actor-managers such as Charles Kean and restored some of the vital conditions of Renaissance stagecraft. For the same reason, he aided scholars in exploring their own theories about Elizabethan practice; for example, his ruthlessly cut performances provided insight into the "two hours traffic" of the Renaissance stage.

Additionally, Monck is posthumously credited with an article in the 1959 Shakespeare Survey, volume 12, about the Maddermarket Theatre. The article was derived from a paper presented by Monck at the Shakespeare Conference, Stratford-upon-Avon, on 5 September 1957. His death is reported to have happened on 21 October 1958.

Highlights from the article include a brief history of the formation of The Norwich Players and the Maddermarket theatre and the financial arrangements required to get the Elizabethan style playhouse off the ground. Also mentioned are details about the opening night 23 September 1921 presentation of "As You Like It" and many subsequent productions from the Shakespeare Canon. Production descriptions talk about specific staging requirements. He also states that he managed to deliver the entire Shakespeare cycle during his 56 years with the company.

These words adequately sum up his perspective, "These remarks are not those of a scholar, not of an original thinker, but of a man who has spent his life trying to put Shakespeare simply on the stage."
