= Thomas Winterbottom =

Thomas Winterbottom may refer to:

- Thomas Masterman Winterbottom (1766–1859), English physician, philanthropist and abolitionist
- Thomas Winterbottom (Lord Mayor of London, 1751-2)
- Thomas Winterbottom (c1815–1869). Royal Marines bandmaster, Plymouth (1851-1869)
