= Maddermarket Theatre =

Theatre in Norwich, England

Coordinates: 52.630193°N 1.292579°E

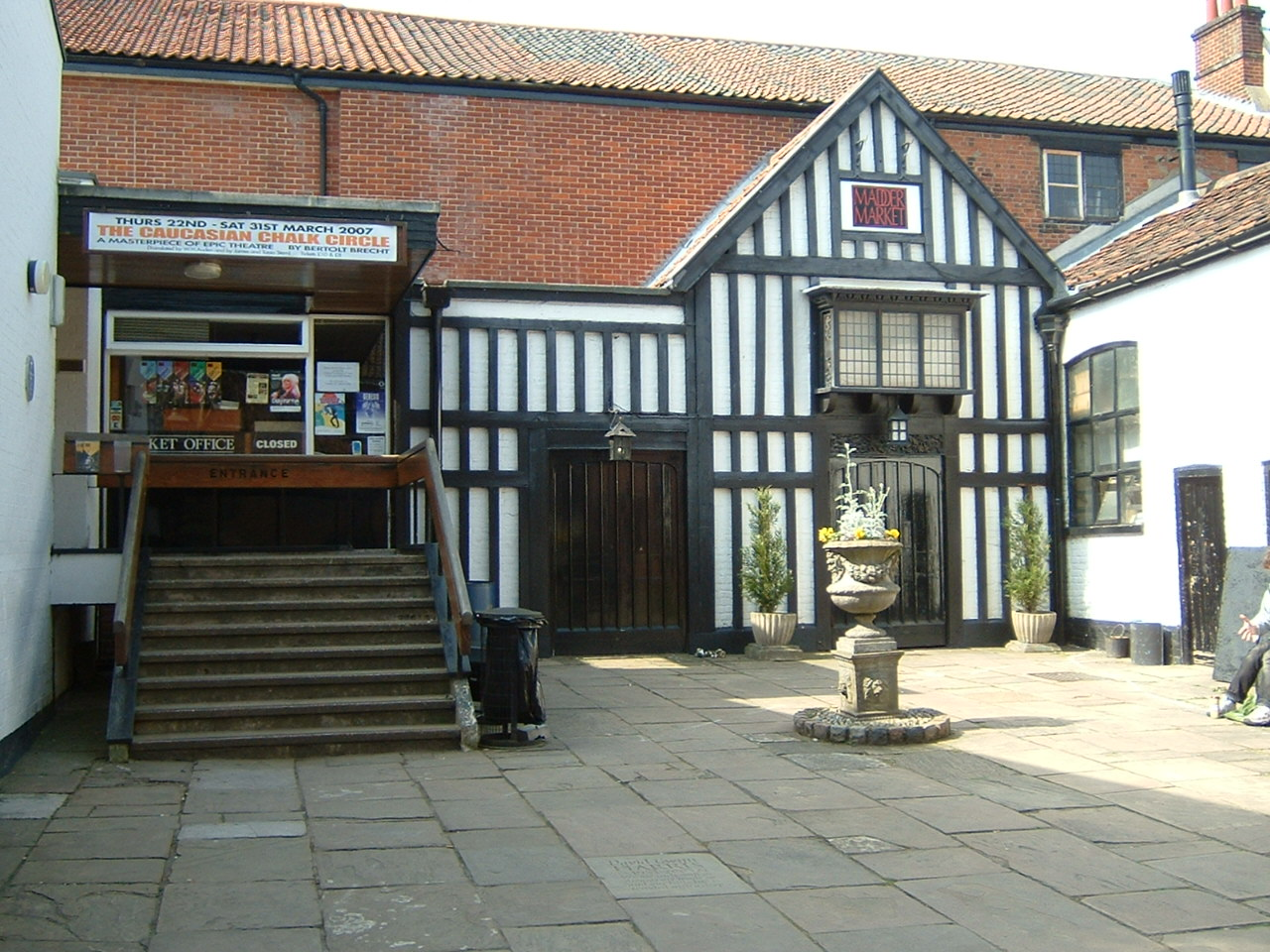
Maddermarket Theatre, Norwich

The Maddermarket Theatre is a British theatre located in St. John's Alley in Norwich, Norfolk, England. It was founded in 1921 by Nugent Monck, and is situated next to Strangers' Hall.

== Early history and conversion ==
The theatre was originally built as a Roman Catholic chapel in the late 18th century by priests living in a tenement at Strangers' Hall. In the nineteenth century it had been used as a baking soda factory, a grocery warehouse, and as a hall for the Salvation Army. It was small, the main body of the building measuring only forty by forty-six feet. However, a vaulted ceiling gave it excellent acoustics; more importantly, it already had galleries on three sides. The building was quickly converted by the Guild of Norwich Players from a state of near-dereliction into an Elizabethan style playhouse. Nugent Monck, the founder of the Guild of Norwich Players used to say it was a half scale model of the Fortune Theatre, although later scholars have suggested that Blackfriars Theatre would be a more accurate comparison.

== Operation ==
The Maddermarket Theatre opened in 1921 and was the first permanent recreation of an Elizabethan Theatre. The founder was Nugent Monck who had worked with William Poel. Poel was the first to restore Shakespeare's plays with the full text and to play them in the Elizabethan style without elaborate scenery.

Monck founded the Norwich Players, an amateur dramatic society, in the early years of the Twentieth Century. They first performed in his house, then at the Music House in King Street. Their success led to him purchasing an eighteenth-century former Catholic chapel in St John Maddermarket in Norwich, which was converted into the Maddermarket Theatre in 1921. The conversion took six weeks to complete with actors rehearsing and then helping to decorate it. It was intended to build a thrust stage but the dimensions of the building and lack of funds resulted in an end-stage being constructed instead. The original form of the building was a rectangular space 40 feet (12 m) wide by 30 feet (9.1 m) long with a gallery running around three sides. The ceiling was in the form of a plaster barrel-vault which gave the building its remarkable acoustic properties.

The stage occupied nearly half the space. A pillared canopy was constructed from which to hang the painted curtains, which Monck used to effect very rapid scene changes. There was a gallery to the rear of the stage and two entrance doors either side of the stage, the two downstage ones being under the side galleries. All of these features are still in place today, although often covered by modern sets.

The first dressing rooms were on the side galleries but are now housed within the main body of the building. The gents' to the side of the stage above the green room and the ladies' behind the stage, backing onto Strangers' Hall museum which in turn backs onto the rear of the theatre.

Over the years tip-up seats have replaced loose chairs. The pillars that supported the side galleries were removed in the 1950s and the curved gallery was re-built straight, to accommodate the new supporting girder. At that time the back wall of the stalls was removed and the auditorium extended back to allow the stalls to accommodate another four rows of seats.

In the 1960s the Medieval buildings flanking the front of the theatre were demolished and a new foyer, bar, toilets, rehearsal room and box office were constructed in a very brutal "modern" style. The site was overgrown with madder plants, some of which were donated to Strangers Hall medieval gardens, who in turn gifted the Theatre its very own madder plant in 2007. Many of the Elizabethan details were covered over the years and the permanent half-timbered set was often covered-over with conventional scenic flats.

When Dave Harris became artistic director, he asked if it were possible to re-construct the stage giving it the thrust as was intended by Monck in the 1920s. This not only involved adding-on an extra seven feet of stage in the form of a half hexagon but also rebuilding the gallery and re-arranging the seating in the front stalls. Despite pessimistic predictions of a great loss of seats only ten seats at the rear of the gallery have been lost. Removal of unnecessary gangways has allowed the stage to be greatly enlarged without any loss of stalls seats (in fact they gained an extra wheelchair position).

The gallery has been reconstructed with a steeper rake and with the original curved tiers re-created. The 1930s cinema seats have been retained in all parts of the 'house'. The new total seating capacity is 310.

All the new work was done to match the 1920s Tudor style of the rest of the original theatre, which is a Grade II 'listed' building. The opportunity was taken to replace the 1960s house-lights with lanterns in order to look more in keeping with the rest of the decor. New front of house lighting positions have been provided and new cable-runs have been concealed in the new floors. The council's City Works Department built the stage and a seating contractor moved the seats. All other work was done in-house.

All the work was done between productions and during a summer closure of approximately six weeks and the total cost was about £10,000. During the autumn, the original permanent set was restored and was first used for a production of Bartholomew Fair, when one of the original Monck painted curtains was used again.

== The Maddermarket Today ==
The Maddermarket Theatre is still staging performances today. In 2020 author Paula Meir became Chair of The Maddermarket Theatre.

== See also ==
- Sewell Barn Theatre
- Theatre Royal, Norwich
- Norwich Arts Centre
