= Richard Ferris (adventurer) =

Richard Ferris (fl. 1580–1606) was an English adventurer.

Ferris was one of the five ordinary messengers attached to Queen Elizabeth I's household. A subpœna was issued for him to give evidence in a suit in the court of the Archbishop of Canterbury on 7 November 1580. In July 1606 he was still filling the office of royal messenger.

Although 'never trayned upon the water,' he resolved in 1590 to accomplish the daring feat of rowing in an open boat from London to Bristol. He embarked in a 'new built' wherry on Midsummer day at Tower Wharf, with two friends, Andrew Hill and William Thomas. At Greenwich they landed, and were entertained at court. Afterwards their journey began in earnest, and although they usually anchored in safe harbours at night, and were well received by the townspeople of the southern seaports, they ran some risks, and did not reach Bristol till 3 August.

The mayor and aldermen gave them a triumphal welcome. They returned to London on 8 August, and wherever they showed themselves were enthusiastically received. The exploit excited the admiration of all classes from the court downwards. On 7 August 1590—only four days after the voyage was finished—'a ballad of Richard Fferrys cominge to Bristowe' was 'licensed to Edward White on 10 Aug.' Another ballad of 'the ioyfull entertainment of the wherry and iij wherrymen, viz., Richard Fferrys, Andrewe Hilles, and William Thomas by the maiour, aldermen, and citizens of Bristoll, 4to Augusti, 1590,' was licensed to Henry Carre.

In the same year John Wolfe printed for Edward White 'The most dangerous and memorable Adventure of Richard Ferris.' On the title-page appear the words, 'Published for the sayd Richard Ferris,' and a dedication to Sir Thomas Heneage, the queen's treasurer, follows. At the close of the tract is 'a new sonnet' celebrating Ferris's arrival at Bristol, by James Sargent. A copy of this rare work is in the Bodleian Library. It was reprinted in J. P. Collier's ' Illustrations of Early English Literature,' vol. ii. No. 5 (1864), and in Professor Arber's 'English Garner,' vol. vi. Warton asserted that Ferrers was the author's correct name.

A peer-reviewed academic article on Ferris's travel stunt entitled "'You serued God he set you free': Self, Nation, and Celebration in the Wager-Voyaging Adventure of Richard Ferris" was written by Michael Lee Manous and published by the journal Early Modern Literary Studies in 2007.
