= Douglas Fox =

Douglas Fox may refer to:

- Douglas Harold Fox, US Navy officer
  - USS Douglas H. Fox
- Douglas Fox (engineer), British civil engineer
- Douglas Fox (organist), British organist and conductor
