= Rosabel Watson =

British conductor and theatre music director (1865–1959)

Rosabel Grace Watson (September 1865 – 5 October 1959) was an English conductor, theatre music director and all-round musician. She was the founder of the first all-female orchestra in the UK.

== Education and early career ==
Watson became interested in music by regularly attending the August Manns concerts at Crystal Palace in the late 1870s. In 1880 she began her professional training at the Guildhall School of Music, studying piano with Lindsay Sloper. She was described in Etude Magazine as "a first-rate all-round musician and a most capable conductor. She is the best woman horn-player in England, and plays the piano and all the stringed instruments extremely well, especially the double bass".

After graduating Watson was active as a soloist and chamber music musician from the early 1880s. She taught music in schools and composing and conducting theatre music. She performed in and arranged concerts at venues including the People's Palace, Mile End and Toynbee Hall. With her friend the pianist Anne Mukle she worked on philanthropic music and drama productions in one of the poorest areas of London, Bethnal Green.

In 1911 she was appointed director of music at the Institute School of Music in Hampstead Garden Suburb (founded by social reformer Henrietta Barnett), until it closed down at the outbreak of war in 1914. Henry Wood was president of the school and lectures were given there by Gustav Holst, Frank Bridge and Ralph Vaughan Williams. Cellist May Mukle (sister of Anne and a member of the Aeolian Orchestra) was on the teaching staff.

== Aeolian Ladies' Orchestra ==
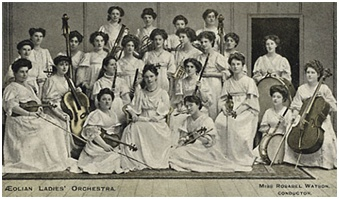
The Aeolian Ladies' Orchestra with Rosabel Watson, conductor (centre), 1912

In 1886 Watson founded the Aeolian Ladies’ Orchestra, said to have been the first all-female orchestra in the UK. In her years on the concert circuit she had already worked with many of the leading female musicians of the day, including violinist Kitty Althaus, oboist Leila Bull, the Chaplin sisters (Nellie, Kate and Mabel), Clara Farrow (horn), Catherine Fidler (trumpet), Anna Lang (violin), Constance Moss (trombone), the Mukle sisters (Lilian, Anne and May), Lucy Mumby (bassoon), flautists Anita Paggi and Edith Penville, Beatrice Pettit (cornet) and clarinetist Frances Thomas.

The orchestra, which flourished in the 1890s and still performed occasionally over the following two decades, employed many of these and other female students and scholars who had trained at the Royal Academy of Music, Royal College of Music and Guildhall School of Music. The orchestra toured nationally - including engagements at the Royal Albert Hall (1896) and in Dublin, and also played at many suffrage gatherings.

Other women only orchestras of this era included the English Ladies' Orchestral Society, the Haresfoot Ladies' Band, the Lady William Lennox's Orchestra and Mrs. Hunt's Ladies' Orchestra.

== Theatre music ==
Watson became an authority on incidental music for the theatre, mostly, but not exclusively Shakespeare. She frequently worked in Stratford at the Royal Shakespeare Company as a music director, from 1916 up until around 1944, often with Donald Wolfit and also with William Poel and the Elizabethan Stage Society. She selected, arranged and sometimes composed the incidental music as well as conducting, though the extent of her contribution is not always clear. For the 1925 production of King John, for instance, the surviving score and parts do not name any composer. Typically she is credited as musical director and/or arranger.

She also worked between 1933 and 1953 at the Regent's Park Open Air Theatre under Robert Atkins, who was in charge there from 1932 until 1961. For instance, she directed the music for Twelfth Night (1934) and the 1937 production of A Midsummer Night's Dream (using Mendelssohn's music) featuring Leslie French as Bottom and Fay Compton as Titania. She also conducted elsewhere, such as the Ballet Rambert's performances at the Arts Theatre in Cambridge in December 1943.

== Final years ==
Watson continued to work regularly into her old age. One of the last theatre music performances she is credited with was a July 1956 production of Twelfth Night at the Open Air Theatre. Watson died in London on 5 October 1959 at the age of 94. Her papers, including original manuscripts, are held at the Harry Ransom Center at The University of Texas at Austin, among the papers of actress Chris Castor and Castor's husband Donald Wolfit.
