= English Ladies' Orchestral Society =

Amateur orchestra for women, founded in 1893

The English Ladies' Orchestral Society was one of the first and largest amateur orchestras for women in the UK, founded in 1893. It had over 100 members, including a full band of wind and strings. The primary organisers were Mary Venables and Marian Arkwright. The conductor (a man) was Mr. J. S. Liddle, organist of St Nicholas' Parish Church in Newbury and also the conductor of the Newbury Choral Society from 1884 and from 1893 the Newbury Amateur Orchestral Union until his death in 1921. Liddle first organised a series of concerts featuring orchestras for female players in 1877.

The orchestra held its rehearsals in London, and concerts were often held in provincial towns, often in aid of charitable causes. Its first public concert was given at Chelmsford in 1893. One later concert, held in Leeds on 29 October 1903, featured Max Bruch's op. 28 Symphony conducted by Liddle, and Hubert Parry's Lady Radnor's Suite, conducted by the composer. The orchestra was still performing in 1910.

== Other ladies-only orchestras ==
Several Viennese Ladies' orchestras were touring Europe and the United States in the 1870s, including those conducted by Marie Grunner, Marie Schpiek and Josephine Weimlich. These helped inspire a number of ensembles in England, including:

- The Dundee Ladies Orchestra, first concert in 1881, performing music by Weber and Mendelssohn.
- Helen Matilda Chaplin's string orchestra, founded in 1881 as the Lady Folkestone's Band and later as Lady Radnor's Band. It continued performing until 1896.
- The Aeolian Ladies' Orchestra, professional, founded 1886 by Rosabel Watson.
- Eleanor Clausen's Orchestra of Young Ladies, founded 1890, all Guildhall students.
- The Rev. E. H. Moberley's, Orchestra, for women from Wiltshire and Hampshire, began regular London concerts from 1892. The orchestra included 70 players, including four men playing double bass.
- The Haresfoot Ladies' Band in Berkhampstead.
- The Lady William Lennox's Orchestra, whose 28 members "performed wearing black gowns with a pink bow on the right shoulder".
- Mrs. Hunt's Ladies' Orchestra.
- Joseph Seebold’s Ladies’ Orchestra (1900s). Seebold was a Swiss musician living in Willesden Green.

Partly due to a shortage of male musicians as war was declared in 1914, female musicians - including Rebecca Clarke (viola) and Jessie Grimson (violin) - were gradually admitted into mainstream, mixed professional orchestras such as Henry Wood's Queen's Hall Orchestra for the first time.

The Society of Women Musicians was founded in 1911. The London Women’s Symphony Orchestra was founded in 1922 by Elisabeth Kuyper. Gwynne Kimpton founded the British Women's Symphony Orchestra in 1923. Kathleen Riddick was the founder of the London Women's String Orchestra in 1938. In the US Ethel Leginska headed the Boston Woman's Symphony Orchestra (1926-1930), founded the National Women's Symphony Orchestra in New York in 1932 and served as director of the Chicago Women's Symphony Orchestra.
