= Godfrey Edward Pellew Arkwright =

British musicologist

Godfrey Edward Pellew Arkwright (10 April 1864 – 16 August 1944) was a British musicologist.

Educated at Oxford, Arkwright was the editor of "The Old English Edition", containing masques, ballets, motets, madrigals, etc., by English composers of the 17th and 18th centuries, and published in 25 volumes between 1889 and 1902. He was the founding editor of "The Musical Antiquary", published quarterly from 1909 to 1913 and also edited church music of Henry Purcell in the Purcell Society's edition published between 1889 and 1902.

Several of Arkwright's manuscript notebooks are held at the Cadbury Research Library, University of Birmingham.

His sister was the composer Marian Arkwright. He lived with her at Crowshott in Highclere, near Newbury.
