= Purcell Society =

The Purcell Society, founded in 1876 (principally by William Hayman Cummings) is an organization dedicated to making the complete musical works of Henry Purcell available. Between 1876 and 1965, scores of all the known works of Purcell were published, in 32 volumes. Advances in musical scholarship and editorial techniques in the decades after the first volumes were issued meant that by the second half of the 20th century they were no longer meeting the needs of users. Beginning in the 1960s, the Purcell Society began to issue revised versions of the scores. The website gives details of the scores in the revised series that are currently available.

== Editorial Committee ==
The volumes of the edition (along with its companion series) were edited by a diverse group of musicians and editors, and moderated by an editorial committee. Editors and committee members include, among others:

- Frank Bridge
- Thurston Dart
- Rebecca Herissone
- Christopher Hogwood
- Peter Holman
- Margaret Laurie
- Andrew Pinnock
- Curtis Price
- Ian Spink
- William Barclay Squire
- Charles Villiers Stanford
- Michael Tilmouth
- Ralph Vaughan Williams
- Bryan White
- Bruce Wood

== Holding libraries ==
All volumes of the complete work of Henry Purcell published by the Purcell Society are available in the Zentral- und Landesbibliothek Berlin and the British Library in London.

The FAL library at the University of New Mexico has in its possession most of the volumes, with some added revised editions. The FAL is missing vols. 1, 6, 8, 10, 16, 18, 21, 23.

== See also ==
- List of compositions by Henry Purcell
- Godfrey Edward Pellew Arkwright
