= Edith Swepstone =

English composer and music teacher

Edith Mary Swepstone
- Born: 4 January 1862; Stepney, London
- Died: 5 February 1942 (aged 80); Tonbridge, Kent
- Education: Guildhall School of Music and Drama
- Occupations: Composer, teacher of music
- Employer: City of London School

Edith Mary Swepstone (4 January 1862 – 5 February 1942) was an English composer and music teacher. She was born in Stepney, London, the daughter of a London solicitor. She studied music at the Guildhall School and later worked as a lecturer at the City of London School. She died in Tonbridge, Kent.

== Career ==
She studied music at the Guildhall School in London, England and later worked as a lecturer at the City of London School. In 1895 she was giving music lectures at the City School of London.

As a composer, Swepstone wrote early 20th-century orchestral music, chamber music, and songs. During the first quarter of the 20th century, she had many of her orchestral works performed by the Bournemouth Municipal Orchestra under Dan Godfey, the most by a single composer. Though the music is not located, 14 of Swepstone’s orchestral works were presented in a total of 24 performances, between 1899 and 1933. There are only three recorded instances of her orchestral music having been performed elsewhere. The minuet and rondo of her Symphony in G minor were performed in Leyton on 10 March 1887 with the composer conducting the Aeolian Ladies' Orchestra, and the opening movement at the Guildhall School of Music on 7 December 1889 as part of a concert of student works. Her overture Les Tenebres was performed at Queen's Hall, London in February 1897.

At the South Place Concert Series, a weekly chamber music concert series in London, between 1887–1987, 1,121 works were performed and women composers make up for only 13 of those compositions. Swepstone’s Piano Quintet in E minor was performed a total of four times at the concert series. Swepstone’s influence is apparent in that, of all the pieces played at the series and written by women, over half were her compositions.

In total, seven of her chamber music compositions were performed at the series. In addition to Piano Quintet E Minor, played four times, the following works were each performed once: Quintet D Hn & String Quartet, Quintet E-flat Pf and Wind, String Quartet Lyrical Cycle, Piano Trio D minor, Piano Trio G minor, Piano Trio A minor.

== Works ==
Selected works include:

Orchestral

- Symphony in G minor (1887, first complete performance Bournemouth, 3 February 1902)
- Les Tenebres overture (fp. Queen's Hall, 1897, Bournemouth 1903)
- Daramona, symphonic poem (fp. Bournemouth, 26 October 1899)
- The Ice Maiden, suite (fp. Bournemouth, 26 November 1900)
- A Vision, tone poem (first performed Bournemouth, 1903)
- Paolo and Francesca, prelude (fp. Bournemouth, February 1906)
- Mors Janua Vitae, funeral march (fp. Bournemouth, April 1906)
- The Wind in the Pines, symphonic poem (fp. Bournemouth, 1909)
- The Horn of Roland, overture (fp. Bournemouth, 1910)
- Moonrise on the Mountains, symphonic poem, (fp. Bournemouth, 26 November 1912)
- Woods in April, symphonic poem, (fp. Bournemouth, 1914)
- The Roll of Honour, march (fp. Bournemouth, June 1916)
- Morte d’Arthur, symphonic poem, (fp. Bournemouth, 1920)
- The Four Ships, suite (fp. Bournemouth, 3 September 1924)

Chamber

- Foreshadowings, with cello accompaniment
- Horn Quintet in D
- Lament for Violin and Piano
- Piano Quintet in E minor
- Piano Quintet in F minor
- Quintet for piano and wind in E flat
- Requiem for cello and Piano
- String Quartet Lyrical Cycle
- Piano Trio in A minor
- Piano Trio in D minor
- Piano Trio in G minor
- Une Larme, for clarinet and piano

Choral and song

- The Crocuses' Lament, Two-Part Song for female voices
- Foreshadowings
- The Ice Queen, cantata, female voice
- Idylls of the Morn, cantata, female voice
- 'O may I join the Choir invisible', text George Eliot
- Robert Louis Stevenson's Songs for Children Set to Music
- A Song of Twilight text by A.R. Aldrich
- Three-Part Song for female voices, with Pianoforte Accompaniment, text by F.R. Haverga
