= Newbury Amateur Orchestral Union =

Amateur orchestra founded in 1879

The N.A.O.U in 1929

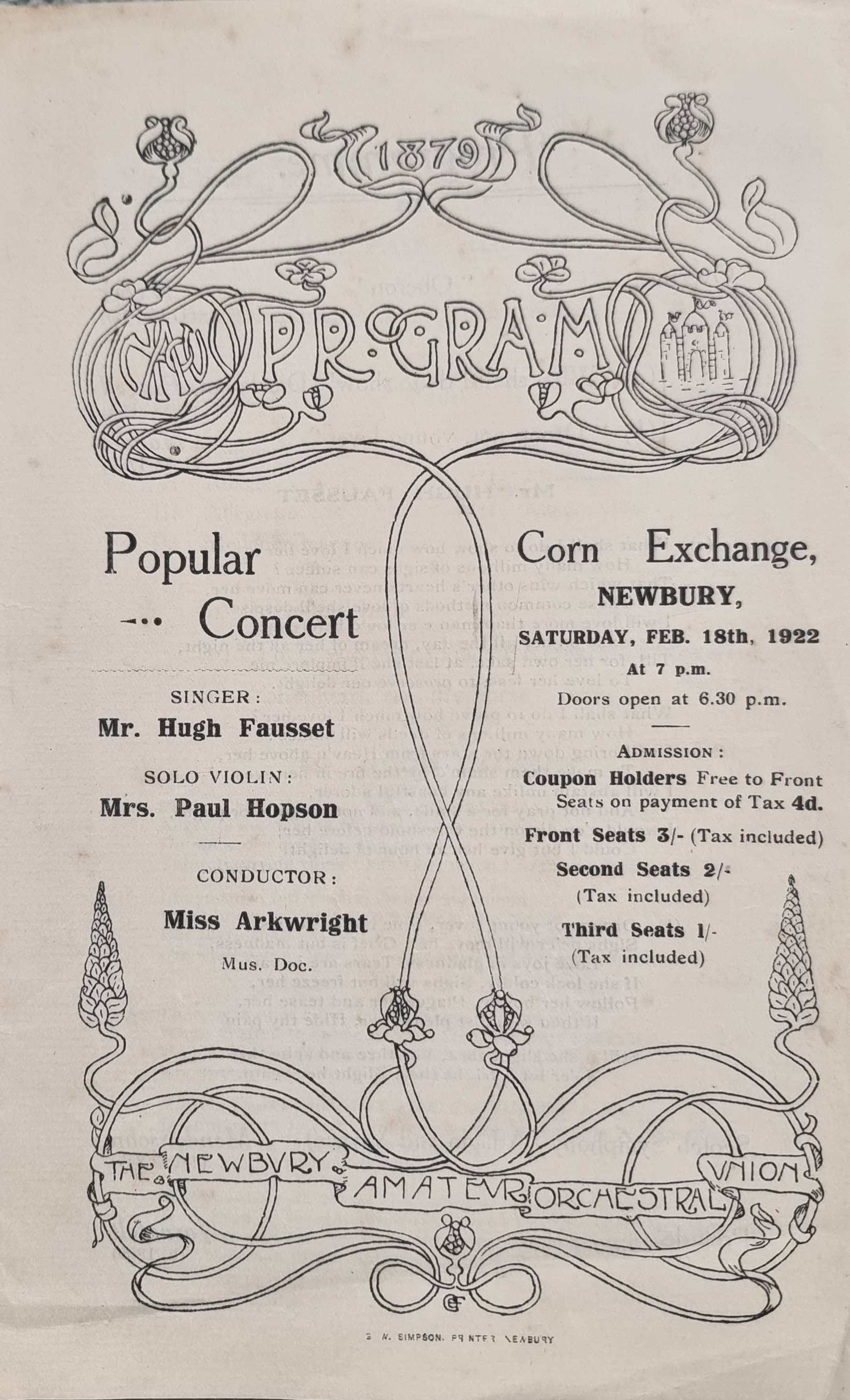
Program of concert conducted by Marian Arkwright shortly before her death

The Newbury Amateur Orchestral Union, since 1964 known as the Newbury Symphony Orchestra, was established at Newbury, Berkshire UK in 1879, and is one of the oldest amateur orchestras in the country.

== History ==
The orchestra was first conducted by G. H. Bates, followed by William Dines Eatwell, both local musicians, with rehearsals at the Queen's Hotel, Newbury (now the Elephant at the Market). Women musicians were included from 1882. After Eatwell's death in 1893 conductorship was taken over by J.S. Liddle, who also conducted the English Ladies Orchestra and Newbury Choral Society. Liddle came to Newbury in the 1870s as organist at St Nicholas Church. He arranged additional concerts further afield for the orchestra, in Wantage, Basingstoke, Reading and Bath. Guest conductors included Hubert Parry and Samuel Coleridge-Taylor. Newbury concerts were held once a month in the winter on a Saturday night at the old Town Hall, moving to the Corn Exchange in 1906 when the Town Hall was demolished.

A prominent member of the Orchestra from 1885 was Marian Arkwright, a pianist, composer, violist and double-bass player who joined the orchestra in 1885 and conducted on some occasions before her death in 1922. The NAOU continued to perform though the First World War despite losses, a 1916 concert concluding with nine national anthems of allied nations. After the First World War conductors included Douglas Fox and George Weldon. Fox conducted despite losing an arm in the First World War. He conducted the 50th jubilee anniversary concert on 4 December 1929, which included choirs for the Choral Symphony. Weldon significantly built up membership, and the orchestra remained strong until the outbreak of war in 1939.

The NAOU continued to perform through the Second World War, though on a smaller scale. Conductors after the war included John Fry (a teacher at Douai Abbey School), who was leading the orchestra for its 75th anniversary in 1954. It was renamed as the Newbury Symphony Orchestra in the 1960s. Ralph Allwood, director of music at Pangbourne College, took the baton from 1975 to 1987. Adrian Brown was his successor, remaining with the orchestra until 2004. The orchestra continues to hold regular concerts.
