= Elizabethan Stage Society =

19th/20th-century theatrical society

The Elizabethan Stage Society was a theatrical society dedicated to putting on productions of drama from the Elizabethan and Jacobean eras, particularly (but not exclusively) those of William Shakespeare. It was founded in 1895 by William Poel. Its minimal scenery, platform stage, quick scene changes and emphasis on the poetry was in direct and deliberate contrast to Herbert Beerbohm Tree and Henry Irving's large-set productions, and were a major influence on later staging and production of these works. Walter Nugent Monck was its stage manager in the 1920s, and its actors included Ben Greet

Writing in 1913, Frederick Rogers, a colleague through his work with the Elizabethan Society of Toynbee Hall, says of Poel and his work:

He has stood consistently and in the face of adverse and sometimes spiteful criticism, for sound learning in dramatic art. His performances of old dramas in old costumes and without scenery; his careful research into the history of stagecraft, and the stimulus it has given to its study, have had an influence on English drama which has never received its full measure of appreciation.

== Poel Workshops ==
The Society for Theatre Research runs an annual set of set of "Poel Workshops" dedicated to the actor's aims.
