= Douglas Fox (organist) =

English pianist, organist and music teacher

- Born: July 1893; Putney, England
- Died: 1978 (aged 84–85) Bristol, England
- Occupation: Conductor
- Instrument: Organ

Dr Douglas Gerard Arthur Fox (born Putney, 12 July 1893 - died Bristol, 23 September 1978) was an English pianist, organist, conductor and music teacher.

Fox was born into a musical family; his father played violin and cello, his mother the piano. His mother may have been a distant relative of Thomas Ravenscroft. In 1902 the family moved to Bristol, and Fox was educated at Clifton College, where Arthur Peppin was director of music, and where he received piano tuition from Dr. R. O. Beachcroft. In 1907 he became the first holder of Clifton's newly founded music scholarship. From 1910 he attended the Royal College of Music where his teachers included Sir Walter Parratt (organ), Herbert Sharpe (piano), Charles Wood (harmony and counterpoint), and Sir Charles Villiers Stanford (orchestral rehearsals).

From 1912 to 1915 he studied music at Keble College, Oxford, where he was organ scholar and came to know Henry Ley and Hugh Allen. Joining the military during World War I, on 27 August 1917 he was badly injured, and his right arm was amputated from the elbow. When Allen (then organist at New College) heard the news, he played Evensong using only his left hand and the pedals. His career as a performing musician seemingly over, his tutors Hubert Parry and Stanford attempted to help their pupil re-adjust. Stanford recommended a career as a conductor and teacher. In 1918 or 1919 Frank Bridge sent him Three improvisations for the left hand for him to practice.

Fox did continue to perform, building up a sizeable repertory for organ and piano recitals which he gave around the country and for BBC broadcasts, including many performances of the Ravel concerto for the left hand. He became the musical director of Bradfield College (1918–1930). In 1922 he became conductor of the Newbury Amateur Orchestral Union. From 1931 to 1957 he was Head of Music at his old school, Clifton College. One of his pupils there was John Sykes. Derek Winterbottom left this description of his organ playing during his time at Clifton.

Douglas was a remarkable and fanatical organist still. His great hand could span three manuals. His pedalling was as good as anyone’s. He was reputed to play certain notes, for which he had no fingers or feet left, with his nose. What he could seldom do was change registration. This became the job of his organ scholars who had to rush from side to side of the console pushing and pulling the knobs at the player’s shouted and sometimes frenzied instructions.

After his retirement from Clifton in 1957 Fox became organist of Great St. Mary's, Cambridge, where he stayed until 1963. In 1958 he was awarded the OBE. He remained unmarried, and from 1963 lived in Bristol with his sister Winifred, at Cowlin House, 26 Pembroke Road, Clifton. He died there on 23 September 1978, his sister surviving him by three years. She published the memoir Douglas Fox (D.G.A.F): A Chronicle, in 1976.
