= Winterbottom (musical family) =

Family of 19th and 20th century military musicians

The Winterbottom family was a family of military band musicians active in the British forces in the nineteenth and early 20th centuries. The best known was Frank Winterbottom: he was director of music, Royal Marine Bands between 1890 and 1910.

The founder of the dynasty was John Winterbottom (1795 – 1855), who served in the 1st Life Guards, fought at Waterloo, and from 1839 until his death was appointed warden of the Tower of London. He married Winifred Midwinter in 1817 and there were eight children. Five of his sons and two of his grandsons became famous military musicians.

- Thomas Winterbottom (c1815 – 1869). John Winterbottom's eldest son, he served in the 1st Life Guards and the Royal Marines, Plymouth, played in the band of the Royal Horse Guards for nine years, and (at Plymouth) was bandmaster of the Royal Marine Light Infantry Band from 1851 until his death. He was interred in Plymouth Cemetery.
- William Winterbottom (c1820 – 29 September 1889). He was a trombone player who played as bandsman, 1st Life Guards and as principal trombone with the Philharmonic Opera and elsewhere. From 1857 he was bandmaster of the Royal Marines at Woolwich (following his brother Henry), and in 1869 took over from his brother Thomas at Plymouth. He made arrangements of operetta and other popular music for brass instruments, and published piano arrangements of Gilbert & Sullivan.
- John Winterbottom (1825 –1897) was a bassoon player who began his career in the Julien Orchestra. In 1852 he travelled to Australia where he was the conductor of a series of promenade concerts. By 1870 he was back in the UK as bandmaster of Royal Marine Artillery, and from 1892 (on his retirement) was appointed bandmaster of the Artists' Rifle Volunteers.
- Henry Winterbottom (dates unknown) was bandmaster of the 7th Royal Fusiliers, the 18th Royal Irish Regiment and (1854–6) of the Royal Marines at Woolwich.
- Ammon Winterbottom (died 1891) was a double-bass player, a member of the Queen Victoria's private band who also played with the Royal Italian Opera and the Philharmonic Orchestra. He was the father of:
  - Frank Winterbottom (21 March 1861 – January 1930). Born in London and educated at Bruce Castle School, Tottenham, he trained as a cellist, was a professor of music at Dulwich College, and (between 1890 and 1910) was director of music for the Royal Marines Band at Plymouth. In his later years he was an instructor at the Royal Military School of Music. He was also a conductor of classical orchestral music and a composer, of the ballets Jorinda and Phantasma, and of the Seven Ages Suite (1892, after Shakespeare), as well as of string quartets and cello music. But his primary legacy comes from his numerous arrangements for military band, still in widespread use. He died, aged 68, in London.
  - Charles Henry Winterbottom (1866 – 1935) was a double-bass player. He played in the Victoria, Edward VII and George V bands, was a founding member of the London Symphony Orchestra (principal double bass, 1904–33) and a professor at both the Royal Academy of Music and the Royal College of Music. He is credited with the creation of new fingering techniques for the double bass. Winterbottom was a friend of Edward Elgar and owned a rare Maggini bass called 'The Old Lady'.

The family were originally associated with Saddleworth (then in Yorkshire), and there is a memorial in Saddleworth Parish Church.

== See also ==
List of musical families (classical music)
