= Early Modern Literary Studies =

- Discipline: English literature
- Language: English
- Edited by: Matthew Steggle

Publication details
- History: 1995-present

Standard abbreviations
- ISO 4: Early Mod. Lit. Stud.

Indexing
- ISSN: 1201-2459

Links
- Journal homepage

Early Modern Literary Studies is a peer-reviewed academic journal covering the study of English literature and literary culture in the sixteenth and seventeenth centuries. It was established in 1995 and is published with the support of the Humanities Research Centre at Sheffield Hallam University. The editor in chief is Matthew Steggle.
