= William Poel =

English actor, theatrical manager and dramatist

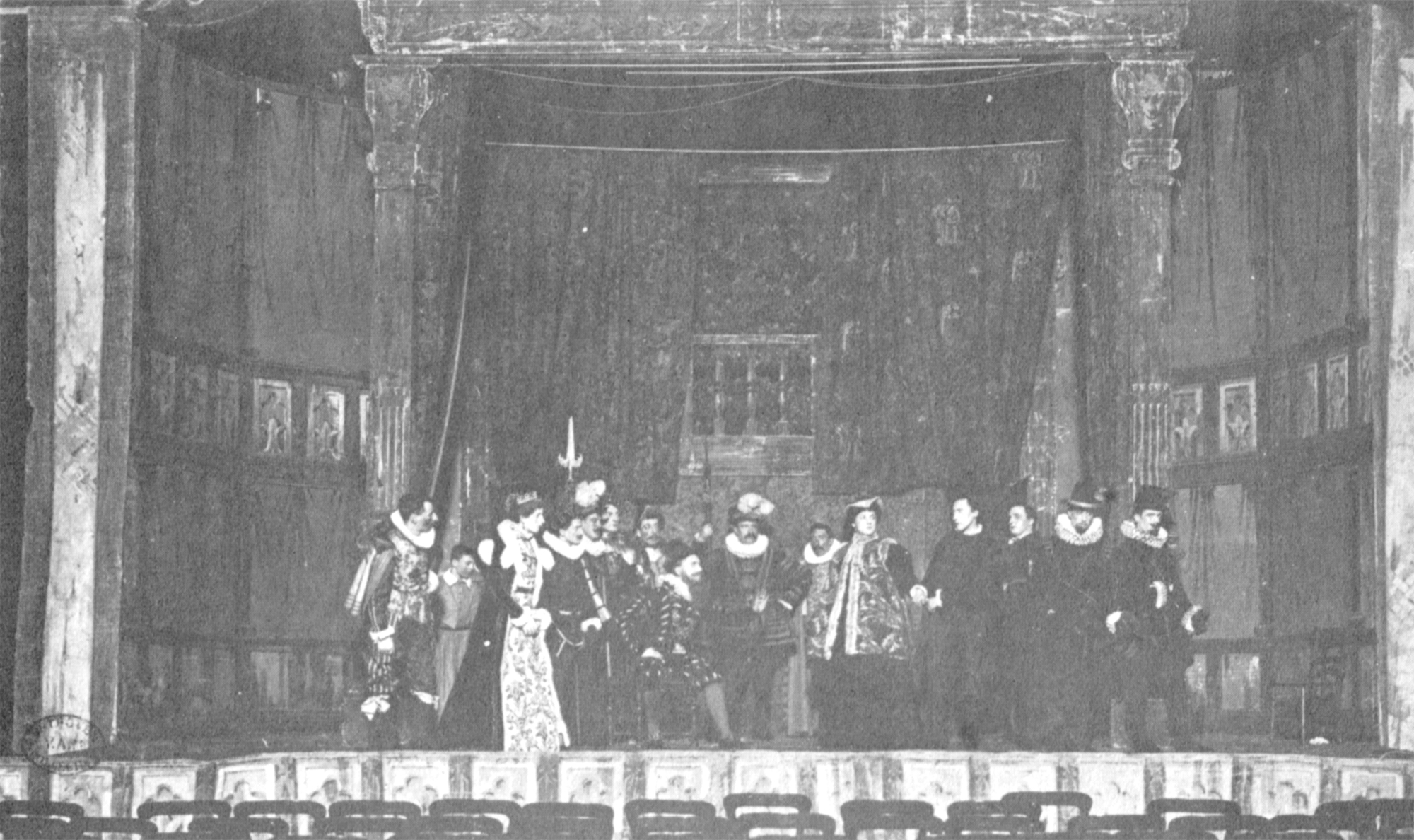
The court scene from Poel's production of Hamlet in 1881

William Poel (22 July 1852 – 13 December 1934) was an English actor, theatrical manager and dramatist best known for his presentations of Shakespeare.

== Life and career ==
A son of William Pole, he grew up among Pre-Raphaelite Brotherhood painters and reportedly sat for William Holman Hunt in his painting The Finding of the Saviour in the Temple. He took on the name Poel following a misspelling of his own name on a theatre billing. At St. George's Hall, London, in 1881 he revived Hamlet, using the text of the first quarto and doing without scenery. From 1881 to 1883 he was manager of Royal Victoria Hall, London, and then for a year manager of F. R. Benson's company.

In 1895 he founded the Elizabethan Stage Society and spent much of his career researching and lecturing on Elizabethan performance. He put his studies to work on stage, as he tried to recreate performances using an open stage, a unified acting ensemble, an uncut text, very little scenery and a swift pace of performance. For incidental music he worked initially with Arnold Dolmetsch, then later with Rosabel Watson. His work affected many theatre practitioners, most of all Harley Granville Barker. His presentations included Shakespeare's Measure for Measure (1893) and Two Gentlemen of Verona (1910), plays by Marlowe and Ben Jonson, Milton's Samson Agonistes (1900) and Swinburne's Locrine (1900).

Poel also dramatized W. D. Howells's A Foregone Conclusion under the title Priest and Painter (produced 1884) and Baring-Gould's novel Mehala (produced 1886). He wrote several comediettas and a book, Shakespeare in the Theatre. The National Portrait Gallery contains a number of pictures by Henry Tonks of Poel in the role as Father Keegan in G. B. Shaw's play John Bull's Other Island. His great-nephew Rupert Pole (1919–2006) was married to Anaïs Nin.

== The Poel Workshops ==
The Poel Workshops, run and promoted by The Society for Theatre Research since 1952, emphasize Poel's approach to text in the delivery of which he desired speed, lightness, musicality and the effect of true speech. The Society for Theatre Research's project has constantly evolved and is now known as the Poel Workshops, but still keeps to its aims of the text-centric and verse-faithful to the plays of Shakespeare.
