= Norwich by-election =

Norwich by-election may refer to:

- 1870 Norwich by-election
- 1871 Norwich by-election
- 1904 Norwich by-election
- 1915 Norwich by-election
- 1917 Norwich by-election
- 2009 Norwich North by-election
