= Godsalve =

Godsalve is a surname. Notable people with the surname include:

- John Godsalve (c. 1505 – 1556), English landowner and politician
- Edward Godsalve, English Roman Catholic divine
