= John Godsalve =

16th-century English politician

The Honourable Sir John Godsalve
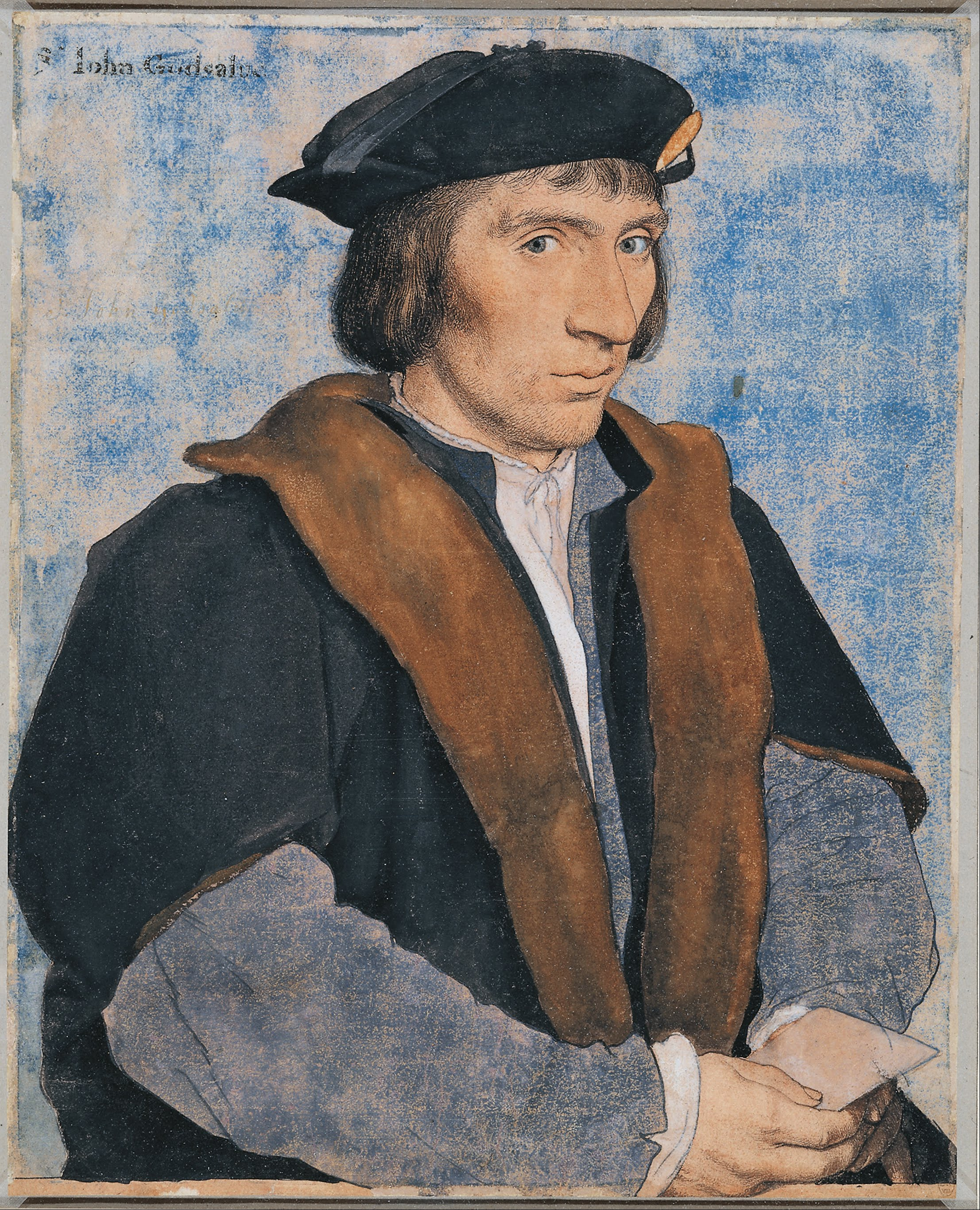
- Sir John Godsalve by Hans Holbein the Younger, ca. 1532–1534
- Born: c. 1505
- Died: 20 November 1556 (aged 50–51); Norwich
- Resting place: St Stephen's Church, Norwich; 52.626606°N 1.292561°E
- Occupation: Politician
- Spouses: Agnes Widmerpole (m. 1530); Elizabeth White (m. 1553)
- Children: with Agnes: William Godsalve; Thomas Godsalve
- Parent: Thomas Godsalve

Sir John Godsalve (c. 1505 – 20 November 1556) of London and Norwich, Norfolk, was an English landowner and politician. He was a Member of the Parliament of England (MP) for the seat of Norwich in 1539, again in 1542 and was knighted in 1547.

== Early life and family ==
He was born about 1505, the eldest son of Thomas Godsalve (died 1542) of Norwich and his 1st wife, Joan. He was admitted to Gray's Inn in 1525.

Godsalve married, firstly, by 1530, Agnes Widmerpole, with whom he had two sons:

- William (b. c. 1530), who died without issue.
- Thomas (d. 1587), who left a son and heir, Roger.

He married, secondly, by 1553, Elizabeth White, daughter of Henry White, an eminent lawyer and former under-sheriff of London.

== Career ==
Godsalve was a Clerk of the Signet by January 1531. He was elected MP for Norwich in 1539 and 1542. On 22 February 1547 he was made a Knight of the Carpet. Godsalve was employed to carry bills from the Lords to the Commons in the Parliaments of 1542, 1545, 1547 and 1555. He was comptroller of the Mint at the Tower of London from 24 June 1548 until 25 March 1552. He appears to have maintained an interest in mint affairs after he relinquished the post, since he and Thomas Egerton are credited with designing the coins depicting the "double face" of Philip and Mary that were issued in 1554.

== Portraits ==
A miniature, attributed to John Bettes, a drawing from the early 1530s and a painting executed in 1528 of Godsalve by Hans Holbein the Younger, which shows him with his father, survive.

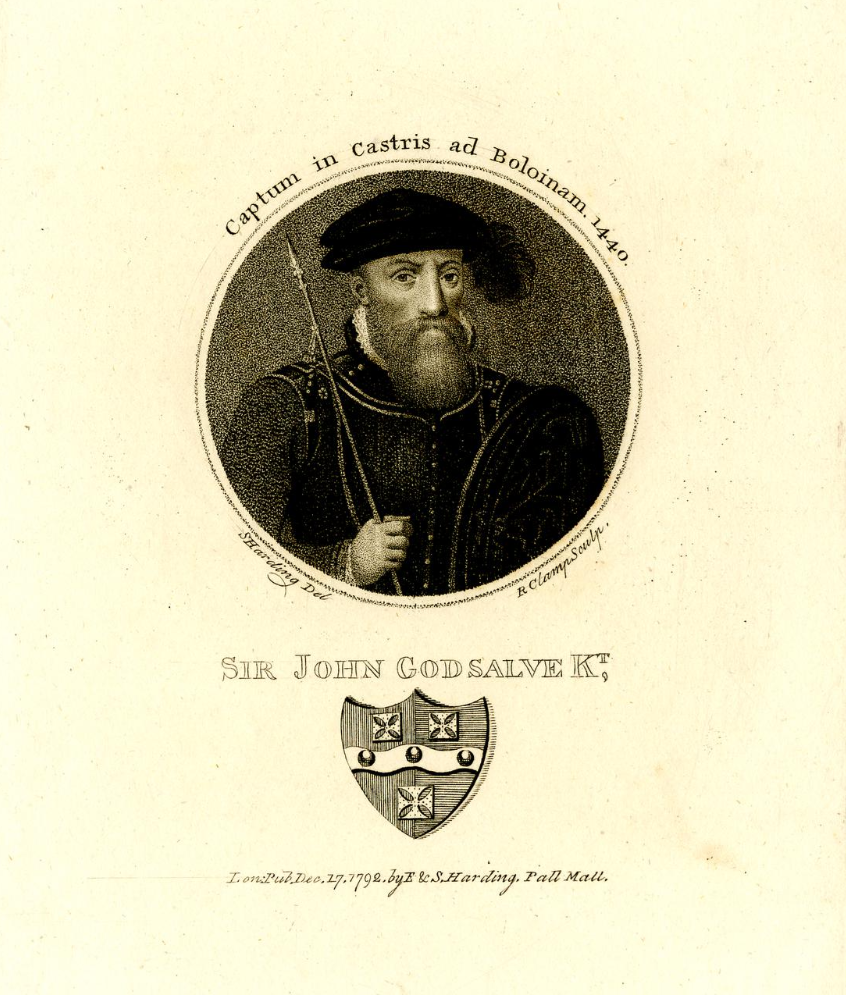
Sir John Godsalve, Kt, 1792. Engraving by R. Clamp after Silvester Harding, from a miniature by John Bettes

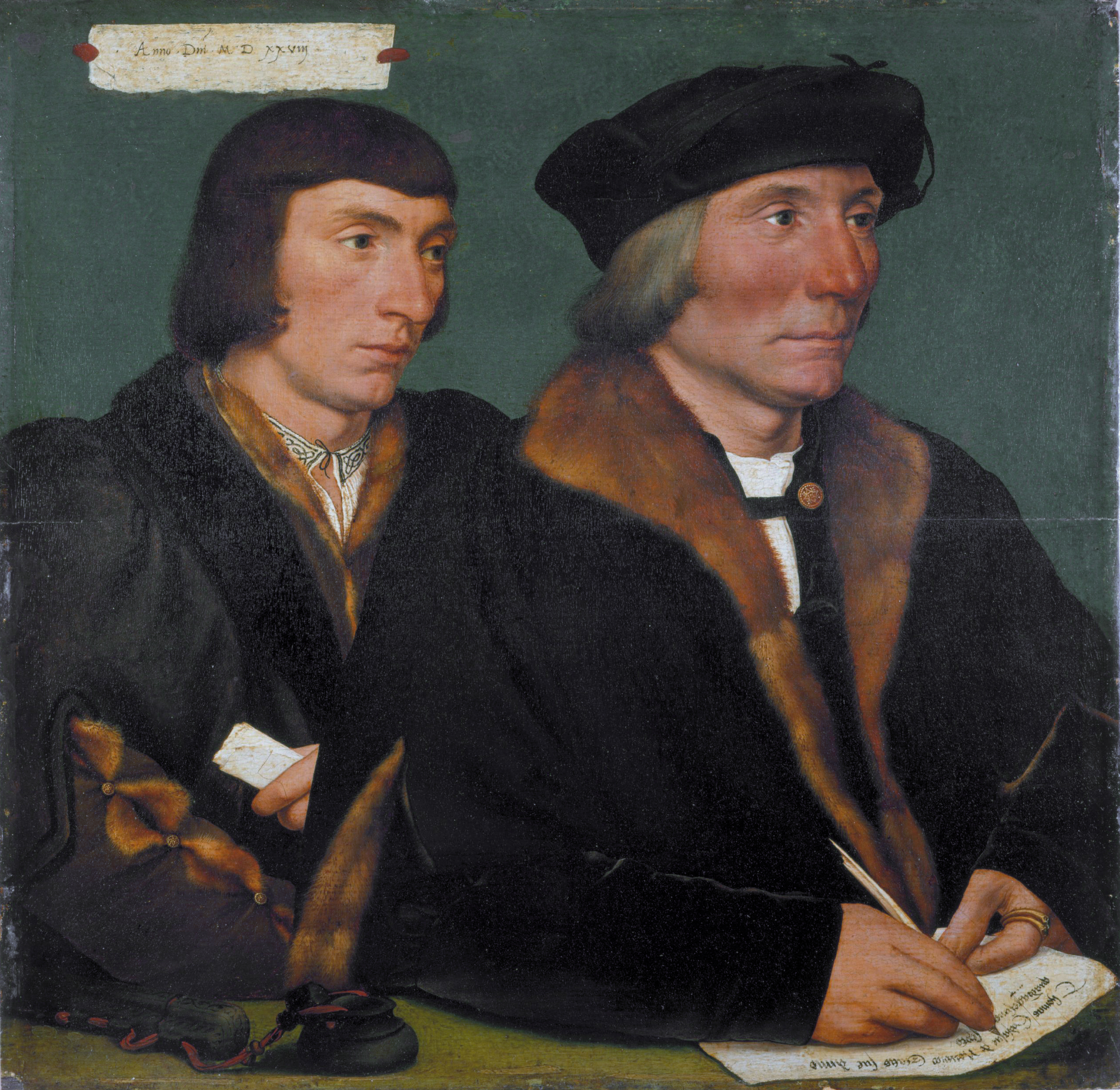
Portrait of Thomas Godsalve and his Son John, 1528. Hans Holbein the Younger (Gemäldegalerie Alte Meister)

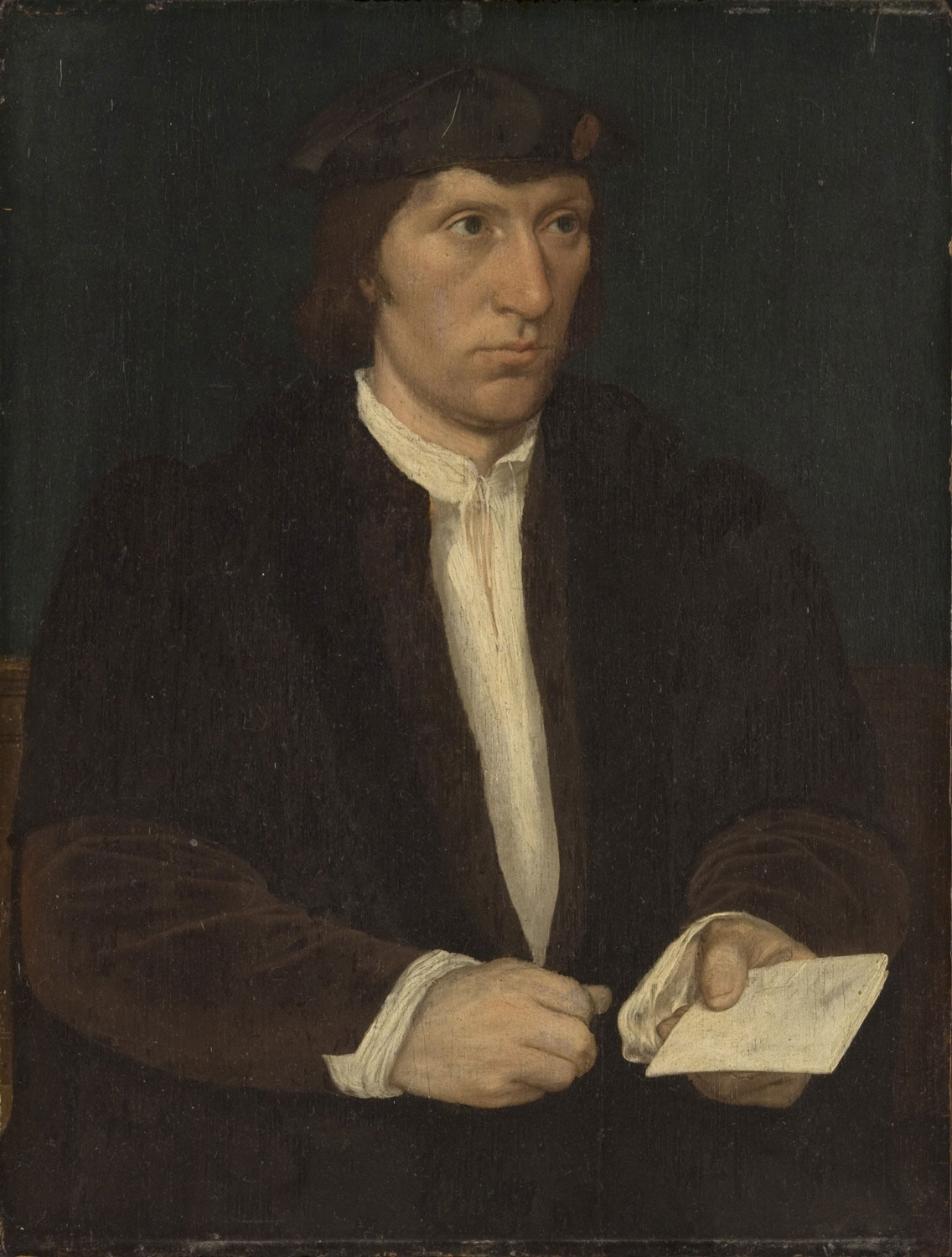
Portrait of John Godsalve, 16th century. Imitator of Hans Holbein the Younger. (Philadelphia Museum of Art)

In the Philadelphia Museum of Art is another half-length painting of Godsalve, at about the same age, wearing similar clothes and the same cap as in the drawing and also holding a folded letter.

== Death ==
He died at Norwich on 20 November 1556. He requested that "my bodie … be buryed in our Ladye Chapell within the churche of Saincte Stephyn in Norwiche next vnto my fathers tombe".

== Bibliography ==
- Coros, D. F. (1982). "Godsalve, John (by 1505-56), of London and Norwich, Norf.". In Bindoff, S. T. (ed.). The History of Parliament: the House of Commons 1509-1558 – via History of Parliament Online.
- Foister, Susan (2006). Holbein in England. London: Tate. p. 50. ISBN 1854376454.
- Hoak, Dale (3 January 2008) [2004]. "Godsalve, Sir John (b. in or before 1505, d. 1556), administrator and landowner". Oxford Dictionary of National Biography (online ed.). Oxford University Press. doi:10.1093/ref:odnb/10886. (Subscription, Wikipedia Library access or UK public library membership required.)
- Josephson, Dana (1 April 2019). "The 'Godsalve' Miniature". The Bodleian Library Record. 32 (1–2): 46–61. doi:10.3828/blr.2019.32.1-2.46.(subscription required)
- Metcalfe, Walter C. (1885). A Book of Knights Banneret, Knights of the Bath, and Knights Bachelor, Made between the Fourth Year of King Henry VI and the Restoration of King Charles II and Knights Made in Ireland, between the Years 1566 and 1698, Together with an Index of Names. London: Mitchell and Hughes. OCLC 5319383.

Parliament of England
Preceded by John Corbet not known	Member of Parliament for Norwich; 1539–1544; With: Augustine Steward 1539–1540; William Rogers 1542–1544	Succeeded by Robert Rugge; Richard Catlyn
