= 1911 West Ham North by-election =

Parliamentary by-election in England

← Dec. 1910	8 July 1911	1918 →

Candidate	de Forest	Wild
Party	Liberal	Conservative
Popular vote	6,807	5,776
Percentage	54.1%	45.9%
MP before election
Charles Masterman
Liberal
Subsequent MP
Sir Ernest Wild
Unionist

The 1911 West Ham North by-election was a Parliamentary by-election which was held on 8 July 1911. It returned one Member of Parliament (MP) to the House of Commons of the Parliament of the United Kingdom, elected by the first past the post voting system.

== Vacancy ==
The Under-Secretary of State for the Home Department, Charles Masterman had been the Liberal MP here since gaining the seat from the Conservatives in 1906. However, his December 1910 re-election was later declared void after his defeated Conservative opponent had petitioned the courts. This meant a repeat election was required. Masterman's agent had been found guilty of corrupt practices. The Counsel for Masterman admitted that the expenses had exceeded the legal limit, and that the agent, who was in bad health, had failed to check the accounts. The counsel for the petitioner (the defeated Conservative candidate), while contending that it was impossible to avoid bringing the petition, in view of the illegal proceeding which had been shown, publicly stated that no imputation had been made against Masterman's integrity, honour, or conduct. In giving judgment the Judges fully concurred with these observations, but declared that it was impossible to give relief and excuse the irregularities disclosed.

== Electoral history ==
In the eight electoral contests since the seat was created in 1885 the Liberal had won five times and the Conservatives three. In each case, the seat had gone to the party who subsequently formed the government. Masterman had comfortably retained his seat at the last general election;

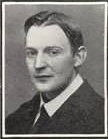
Masterman

General election December 1910: West Ham North
Party	Candidate	Votes	%	±%
Liberal	Charles Masterman	6,657	53.6	+0.2
Conservative	Ernest Wild	5,760	46.4	−0.2
Majority		897	7.2	+0.4
Turnout		12,417	79.3	−0.7
Liberal hold		Swing	+0.2	

== Candidates ==
- Masterman was not allowed to defend his seat. (He subsequently returned to parliament following the 1911 Bethnal Green South West by-election). His successor as Liberal candidate was 32-year-old Maurice de Forest. Maurice de Forest had been a Progressive member of the London County Council since March 1910, representing Kennington. He had contested the January 1910 general election for the Liberals at Southport, Lancashire. In 1889 the Emperor of Austria has given him the title of Baron De Forest and he inherited a substantial estate in Austria-Hungary. He had been a naturalised British citizen since 1900.
- The Conservative candidate was 42-year-old Ernest Wild, who had stood here last time. He had previously fought the 1904 Norwich by-election and Norwich again in 1906. He had represented Holborn on the London County Council from 1907 to 1910. He was born in Norwich and attended Norwich School. He was a Barrister who had been called to Bar at Middle Temple in 1893. He had been Judge of the Norwich Guildhall Court of Record since 1897.

== Campaign ==
The prominent national issue of the day was the Liberal government's Veto Bill, that they had introduced to curb the power of the House of Lords. The Liberal candidate de Forest, in his election address stated that he was in favour of land nationalisation, Irish Home Rule, revised licensing laws, female suffrage and equality of religion in education.

== Result ==
Polling took place on Saturday 8 July. The Liberals held the seat on a reduced poll with a slight increase in their vote-share:

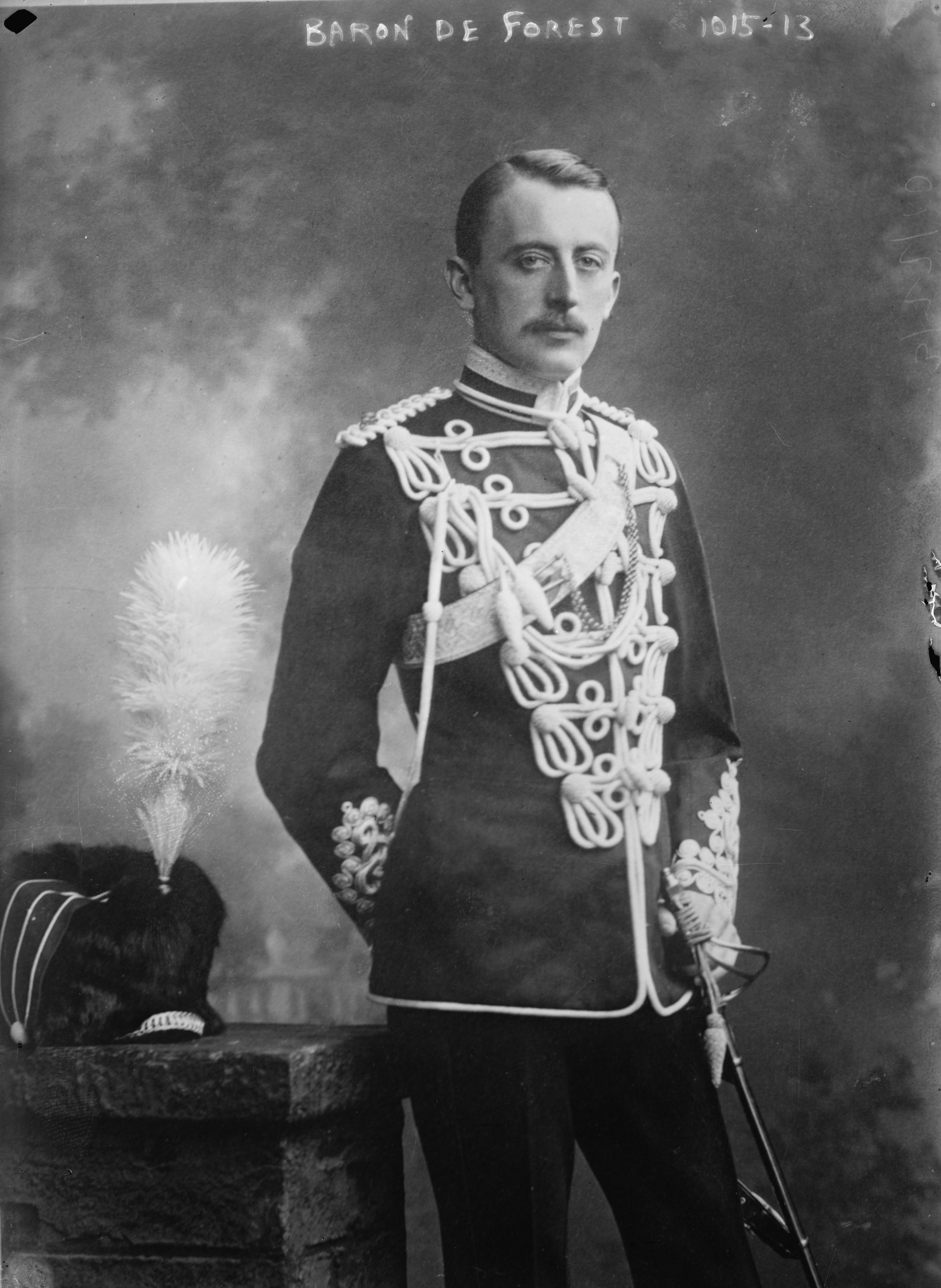
de Forest

1911 West Ham North by-election
Party	Candidate	Votes	%	±%
Liberal	Maurice de Forest	6,807	54.1	+0.5
Conservative	Ernest Wild	5,776	45.9	−0.5
Majority		1,031	8.2	+1.0
Turnout		12,583	76.2	−3.1
Liberal hold		Swing	+0.5	

Baron de Forest described his victory as "the last nail in the coffin of the House of Lords," attributing his victory to the government's Veto Bill and the advanced radical platform on which he stood. Wild blamed his defeat on his potential helpers preferring to watch the Eton v Harrow school cricket match.

== Aftermath ==
A General Election was due to take place by the end of 1915. By the autumn of 1914, the following candidates had been adopted to contest that election.

- Liberal: Maurice de Forest
- Unionist: Ernest Wild

Due to the outbreak of war, the election never took place. At the outbreak of war, Unionists tried to paint de forest as an enemy sympathiser, despite the fact that he joined the Royal Navy Volunteer Reserve. Under boundary revision, the constituency was abolished and replaced mainly by Upton for the 1918 elections. De Forest did not stand as a candidate at the 1918 elections. Wild did stand and was the endorsed candidate of the Coalition Government, helping him win the new seat;

Wild

General election 1918: Upton
Party	Candidate	Votes	%	±%
Unionist	Sir Ernest Wild	8,813	61.2	N/A
Labour	Benjamin Walter Gardner	3,186	22.2	N/A
Liberal	John Charles Nicholson	2,380	16.6	N/A
Majority		5,627	39.0	N/A
Turnout		14,379	46.8	N/A
Unionist win (new seat)				
