= Bartholomew Appleyard =

English politician

Bartholomew Appleyard (fl. 1411–1414) was an English politician. He sat as MP for Norwich in 1411 and February 1413.

He was probably the son of William Appleyard, who sat as MP for Norwich and was likely named after William's father, Bartholomew Appleyard, who also sat as MP for Norwich.
