= Thomas Beaumont =

Thomas Beaumont may refer to:

- Thomas de Beaumont, 6th Earl of Warwick (1208–1242), English peer
- Thomas Beaumont (died c. 1582), MP for Norwich in 1572
- Sir Thomas Beaumont (died 1614) (1576–1614), of Stoughton Grange, MP for Leicestershire, 1604
- Thomas Beaumont, 1st Viscount Beaumont of Swords (died 1625), Irish peer, MP for Leicestershire and Viscount Beaumont of Swords
- Thomas Beaumont, 3rd Viscount Beaumont of Swords (1634–1702), Irish peer, Viscount Beaumont of Swords
- Sir Thomas Beaumont, 1st Baronet (died 1676), English MP for Leicestershire
- Thomas Richard Beaumont (1758–1829), British MP for Northumberland 1795–1818
- Thomas Wentworth Beaumont (1792–1848), British MP for Stafford, Northumberland 1818–1826, 1830–1832, and South Northumberland

== See also ==
- Beaumont (disambiguation)
