= Louis Tillett (politician) =

English politician

Louis Tillett

Louis John Tillett (13 June 1865 in Sprowston, Norfolk – 24 November 1929 in Buxton, Norfolk) was a Liberal Party politician.

He was elected as a Member of Parliament (MP) for Norwich at the 1904 by-election on 15 January 1904. He was re-elected in 1906 and held the seat until he stood down from the House of Commons at the 1910 general election in January of that year.

== Personal life ==
Tillett's grandfather was Liberal politician Jacob Henry Tillett, MP for Norwich and Mayor of Norwich (1875-1876). He married the daughter of Norwich Castle Museum & Art Gallery curator James Reeve, Ellen May in 1896; she died in 1905. Before his election to parliament, Tillett worked as a solicitor in Norwich.

After retirement from political life, Tillett was still involved with the local community and it was during the great floods of 1912, in Norwich, that he was attributed to helping a pregnant lady, risking his own life to get her to safety.

Tillett died in Buxton, Norfolk, at the age of 64. He was described as "widely-loved" in the obituary within the local paper, with "the streets lined with hatless and reverent spectators".

Parliament of the United Kingdom
Preceded by Sir Harry Bullard; Sir Samuel Hoare, Bt	Member of Parliament for Norwich; 1904–1910; With: George Henry Roberts	Succeeded by Sir Frederick Low; George Henry Roberts
