= Frederick Low (British politician) =

Frederick Low

Sir Frederick Low (21 November 1856 – 4 September 1917) was an English lawyer, judge and Liberal Party politician.

Low was educated privately and at Westminster School. He qualified as a solicitor in 1878, and was called to the bar in 1890, practising on the South-Eastern Circuit and becoming an authority on local government and licensing. He became a King's Counsel in 1902, and became recorder of Ipswich in 1906. He was knighted in 1909.

At the 1900 general election, Low unsuccessfully contested Salisbury, and he was unsuccessful again when he contested Clapham in 1906. He won a seat on his third attempt, when he was elected at the January 1910 general election as one of the two Members of Parliament (MPs) for Norwich. He was re-elected in December 1910, and held the seat until January 1915, when he was appointed as a Judge of the King's Bench division of the High Court.

Parliament of the United Kingdom
Preceded by Louis Tillett; George Henry Roberts	Member of Parliament for Norwich; January 1910–1915; With: George Henry Roberts	Succeeded by Hilton Young; George Henry Roberts
