= Walter Bixton =

English Member of Parliament

Walter Bixton (died 1403/4), of Norwich, Norfolk, was an English Member of Parliament (MP).

He was a Member of the Parliament of England for Norwich 1362, October 1377, 1378, January 1380, 1381, May 1382, October 1382, February 1383, October 1383, 1386, February 1388, September 1388, January 1390, 1391, September 1397.
