= Edward Warner (1818–1875) =

Edward Warner (1818 – 7 March 1875) was an English Whig politician.

He was a Member of Parliament for Norwich from 1852 to 1857, and from 1860 to 1868.

Parliament of the United Kingdom
Preceded by Marquess of Douro; Morton Peto	Member of Parliament for Norwich; 1852 – 1857; With: Morton Peto to 1854; Samuel Bignold 1854–57	Succeeded by William Keppel; Henry Schneider
Preceded by Henry Schneider; William Keppel	Member of Parliament for Norwich; 1860 – 1868; With: Sir William Russell, Bt	Succeeded by Sir William Russell, Bt; Sir Henry Stracey, Bt
