= William Keppel, 7th Earl of Albemarle =

Soldier, politician (1832–1894)

Lieutenant-Colonel The Right Honourable The Earl of Albemarle KCMG PC ADC
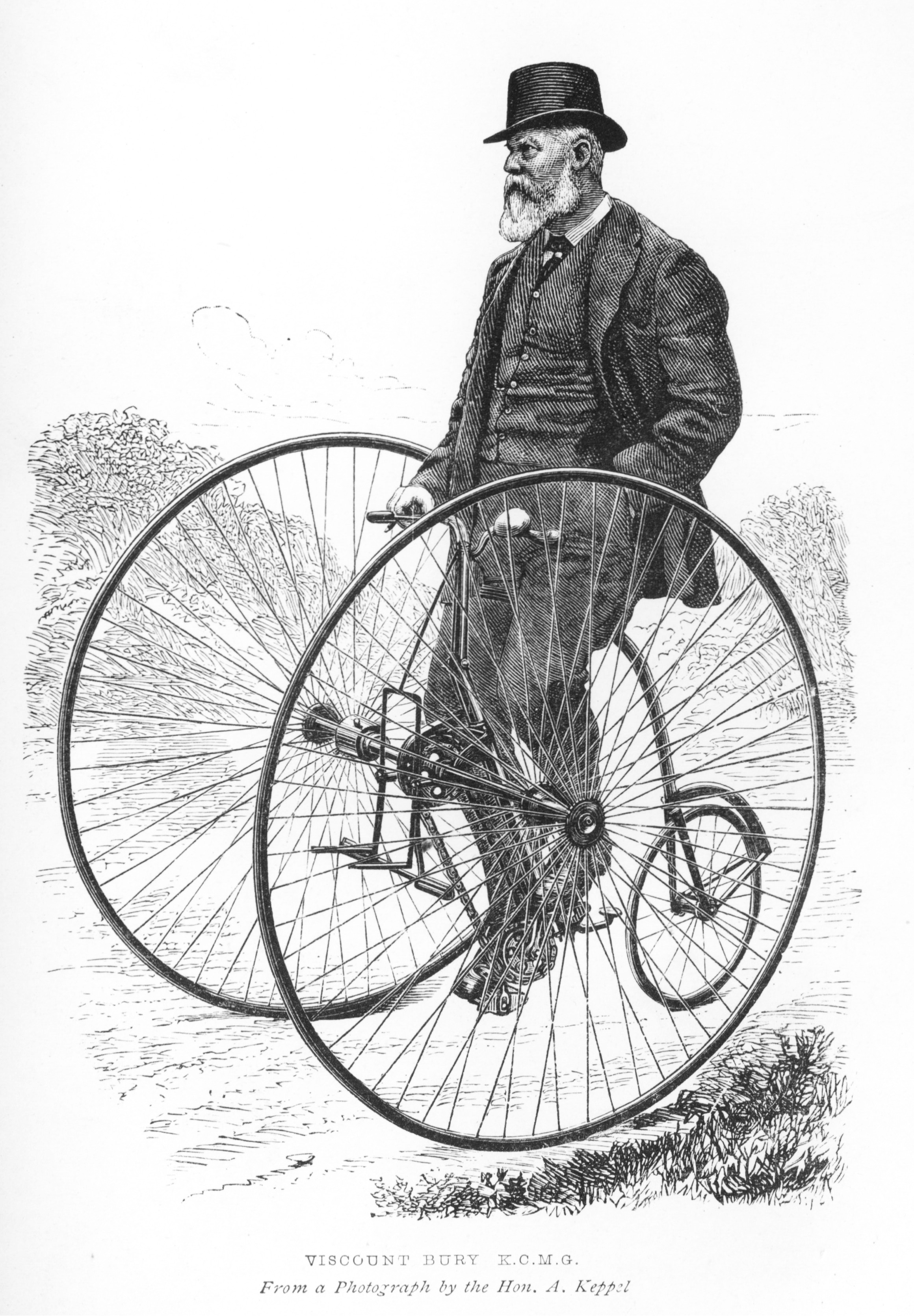
- Viscount Bury on a Humber Roadster tricycle, 1880s

Under-Secretary of State for War
- In office 4 March 1878 – 21 April 1880
- Monarch: Victoria
- Prime Minister: The Earl of Beaconsfield
- Preceded by: The Earl Cadogan
- Succeeded by: The Earl of Morley
- In office 26 June 1885 – 28 June 1886
- Monarch: Victoria
- Prime Minister: The Marquess of Salisbury
- Preceded by: The Earl of Morley
- Succeeded by: The Lord Sandhurst

Personal details
- Born: William Coutts Keppel; 15 April 1832 London, England
- Died: 28 August 1894 (aged 62)
- Party: Liberal; Conservative
- Spouse: Sophia MacNab (m. 1855)
- Children: Arnold Keppel, 8th Earl of Albemarle; Hon. Gertrude Keppel; Lady Theodora Davidson; Sir Derek Keppel; Lady Hilda Keppel; Hon. George Keppel; Lady Leopoldina Keppel; Lady Susan Townley; Lady Mary Tagart; Florence Boyle, Countess of Cork and Orrery
- Parents: George Keppel, 6th Earl of Albemarle; Susan Coutts Trotter

Lieutenant-Colonel William Coutts Keppel, 7th Earl of Albemarle, KCMG, PC, ADC (15 April 1832 – 28 August 1894), styled Viscount Bury between 1851 and 1891, was a British soldier and politician. He served in the British Army before entering Parliament in 1857. Initially a Liberal, he served as Treasurer of the Household between 1859 and 1866 in the Liberal administrations headed by Lord Palmerston and Lord Russell. He later switched to the Conservatives and held office as Under-Secretary of State for War under Lord Beaconsfield between 1878 and 1880 and under Lord Salisbury between 1885 and 1886.

Lord Albemarle was sixth in direct line of descent from King Charles II, and he was the great-great-grandfather of Queen Camilla.

== Early life ==
Keppel was born in London, England on 15 April 1832. He was the only son of General George Keppel, 6th Earl of Albemarle, by his wife Susan Coutts Trotter, daughter of Sir Coutts Trotter, 1st Baronet of Westville.

He was educated at Eton. He became known by the courtesy title Viscount Bury when his father succeeded in the earldom of Albemarle in 1851.

== Career ==
Keppel became an ensign and lieutenant in the 43rd (Regiment of) Foot in 1843, a lieutenant in the Scots Guards in 1848 and an Aide-de-camp to Lord Frederick FitzClarence in India in 1853. From 1854 until 1856, he was Superintendent of Indian Affairs in Canada.

He raised the 21st Middlesex Rifles Volunteer Corps (Civil Service Rifles) in 1860.

=== Political career ===
Initially a Liberal, Lord Bury was elected Member of Parliament (MP) for Norwich in 1857, and later represented Wick Burghs from 1860 to 1865 and Berwick-upon-Tweed from 1868 to 1874. In 1859 he was sworn of the Privy Council and appointed Treasurer of the Household of Queen Victoria, under Lord Palmerston, a post he held until 1866, the last year under the premiership of Lord Russell. In 1870, he was appointed a Knight Commander of the Order of St Michael and St George. On 6 September 1876 he was summoned to the House of Lords through a writ of acceleration in his father's barony of Ashford.

Two years later Lord Bury was appointed Under-Secretary of State for War in Lord Beaconsfield's Conservative administration which he remained until the government fell in 1880. In 1881, he became a Volunteer Aide-de-Camp (ADC) to the Queen. He was once again Under-Secretary of State for War from 1885 to 1886 under Lord Salisbury.

He wrote a history of the American colonization called Exodus of the Western Nations (1865), A Report on the Condition of the Indians of British North America, and was the principal author, with George Lacy Hillier, of the Cycling volume of the Badminton Library (1887). In 1891 he succeeded his father in the earldom.

== Personal life ==
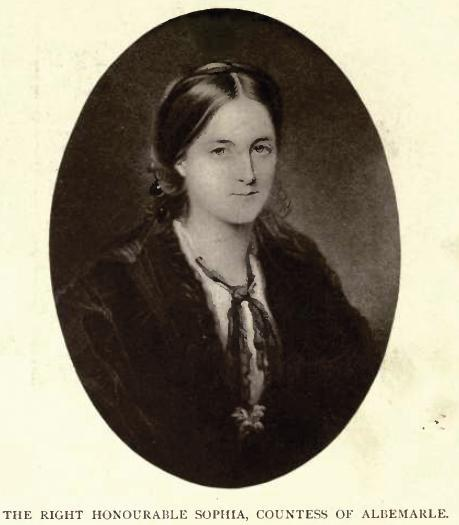
Sophia Keppel, Countess of Albemarle

Lord Albemarle married Sophia Mary MacNab at Dundurn Castle, Hamilton, Canada, on 15 November 1855. MacNab was the daughter of Allan MacNab, a Joint Premier of the Province of Canada, and a descendant of Loyalist Ephraim Jones. Together, they had ten children:

- Lt.-Col. Sir Arnold Allen Cecil Keppel, 8th Earl of Albemarle (1 June 1858– 12 April 1942); married Lady Gertrude Lucia Egerton, only child of Wilbraham Egerton, 1st Earl Egerton of Tatton.
- Hon. Gertrude Mary Keppel (November 1859–7 April 1860); died in infancy.
- Lady Theodora Keppel (11 January 1862 – 30 October 1945); married Colonel William Leslie Davidson and had issue:
  - Leopoldina Theodora Davidson, of Inchmarlo (October 1894 - 1974); Justice of the Peace for Wiltshire (1930); she married on 7 October 1924 at Brompton Oratory Major Walter Basil Louis Bonn and had issue.
  - Hilary Davidson, of Inchmarlo, a Roman Catholic nun.
  - Vera Marian Davidson, of Inchmarlo; married (15 December 1914) Aylmer Probyn Maude, Solicitor
  - Captain Donald Alastair Davidson, of Inchmarlo (6 October 1891 – 20 April 1917); Page of Honour to King Edward VII from 1902 to 1908; killed in action during World War I.
  - Lt.-Col. Colin Keppel Davidson, of Inchmarlo; Equerry to The Duke of Windsor from 1936 to 1940; married in 1939 Lady Mary Rachel Fitzalan-Howard, daughter of Henry Fitzalan-Howard, 15th Duke of Norfolk, and had issue. Lady Rachel was Lady-in-waiting to Princess Marina of Greece and Denmark, later Princess Marina, Duchess of Kent.
- Lt.-Col. Hon. Sir Derek William George Keppel
- Lady Hilda Mary Keppel (1864–1955); died unmarried, a nun.
- Lt.-Col. Hon. George Keppel (14 October 1865 – 22 November 1947); married Alice Edmonstone (the long-time (1898-1910) mistress and confidante of King Edward VII); Keppel and Edmonstone were the great-great-grandparents of Queen Camilla.
- Lady Leopoldina Olivia Keppel (1866–1948); a goddaughter of King Leopold II of Belgium; she became a nun, known religiously as "Madame Keppel".
- Lady Susan Mary Keppel (1868–1953); married Sir Walter Beaupre Townley in 1896.
- Lady Mary Stuart Keppel (1869–1906); married Major-General Sir Harold Arthur Lewis Tagart in 1900.
- Lady Florence Cecilia Keppel (1871–1963); married William Boyle, 12th Earl of Cork, in 1902.

Lord Albemarle was received into the Roman Catholic Church on Easter Sunday, 13 April 1879. He died in August 1894, aged 62, of paralysis, and was buried at Quidenham in Norfolk. His eldest son Arnold succeeded in the earldom. The Countess of Albemarle died in April 1917, aged 84.

== Arms ==
Coat of arms of William Keppel, 7th Earl of Albemarle
Coronet Coronet of an Earl. Crest Out of a ducal coronet or, a swan's head and neck argent. Escutcheon Gules, three escallops argent. Supporters Two lions ducally crowned or. Motto Ne cede malis (Yield not to adversity) Orders The Most Distinguished Order of St.Michael and St.George - Knight Commander (KCMG).

Parliament of the United Kingdom
Preceded by Edward Warner; Sir Samuel Bignold	Member of Parliament for Norwich; 1857–1860; With: Henry William Schneider	Succeeded by Edward Warner; Sir William Russell, Bt
Preceded by Samuel Laing	Member of Parliament for Wick Burghs; 1860–1865	Succeeded by Samuel Laing
Preceded by Dudley Marjoribanks; Alexander Mitchell	Member of Parliament for Berwick-upon-Tweed; 1868–1874; With: John Stapleton	Succeeded by Dudley Marjoribanks; David Milne Home
Political offices
Preceded by Lord Claud Hamilton	Treasurer of the Household; 1859–1866	Succeeded by Lord Otho FitzGerald
Preceded by The Earl Cadogan	Under-Secretary of State for War; 1878–1880	Succeeded by The Earl of Morley
Preceded by The Earl of Morley	Under-Secretary of State for War; 1885–1886	Succeeded by The Lord Sandhurst
Peerage of England
Preceded by George Keppel	Earl of Albemarle; 1891–1894	Succeeded by Arnold Keppel
Preceded by George Keppel	Baron Ashford (writ of acceleration); 1876–1894	Succeeded by Arnold Keppel
