= Harry Bullard =

British politician

Bullard in 1895.

Sir Harry Bullard JP DL (3 March 1841 – 26 December 1903) was an English brewer and Conservative politician.

Bullard was born at Norwich, the son of Richard Bullard, who had founded the brewery company of Bullard & Watts in 1837. When Richard Bullard died in 1864, his three sons, Harry, Charley and Fred ran the brewery, erecting the new building in 1864 which still remains as a shell. In March 1895 the brewery was incorporated as a limited company.

In 1877, Harry Bullard was made Sheriff, and he was Mayor of Norwich in 1878, 1879 and 1886. At the 1885 general election Bullard was elected as one of the two Members of Parliament (MP) for Norwich, but he was unseated on petition. He was knighted in 1887. At the 1895 general election he stood successfully at Norwich, and held the seat until his death in 1903. He was made a deputy lieutenant of Norfolk in 1887, and also served as a justice of the peace (J.P.) for the county. He lived at Hellesdon House.

Parliament of the United Kingdom
Preceded by Jacob Henry Tillett; Jeremiah Colman	Member of Parliament for Norwich; 1885–1886; With: Jeremiah Colman	Succeeded by Sir Samuel Hoare; Jeremiah Colman
Preceded by Sir Samuel Hoare; Jeremiah Colman	Member of Parliament for Norwich; 1895–1903; With: Sir Samuel Hoare	Succeeded by Sir Samuel Hoare; Louis Tillett
