= Thomas Palgrave =

English politician (1642–1726)

Thomas Palgrave (1642 – 7 August 1726) was an English Tory politician. He sat as MP for Norwich from 22 December 1703 till 1705.

He was baptised on 1 February 1642. He was the second but first surviving son of Thomas Palgrave (died 1686) and Joan. By 1681, he married Mary, the daughter of Robert Howard and had two sons who predeceased him and three daughters.
