= Sir William Russell, 2nd Baronet =

British Army officer and politician (1822–1892)

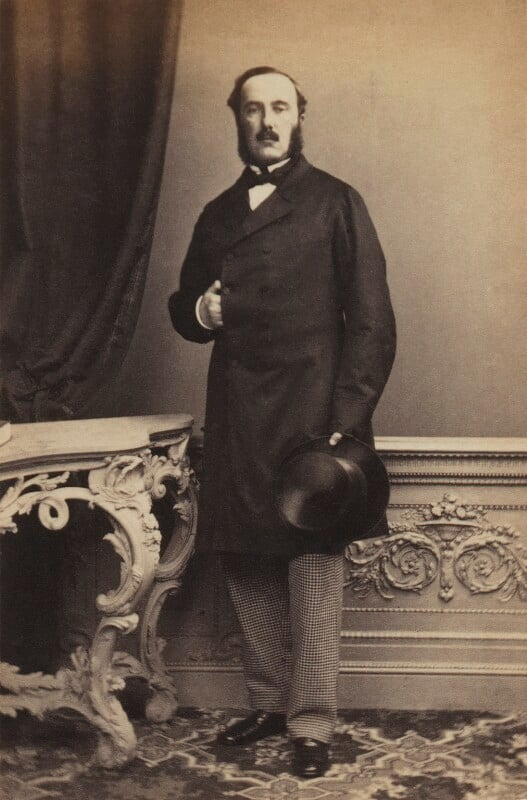
Russell in the 1860s

Lieutenant-General Sir William Russell, 2nd Baronet CB (5 April 1822 – 19 March 1892), was a British Army officer who served in the Crimean War and in the suppression of the Indian Rebellion of 1857, and then became a Liberal Party politician. He was a Member of Parliament (MP) for Dover from 1857 to 1859, and for Norwich from 1860 to 1874.

== Early life ==
Russell was the son of Sir William Russell, 1st Baronet of Charlton Park (1773–1839) and his second wife Jane Eliza Russell, daughter of Major-General James Dodington Sherwood.

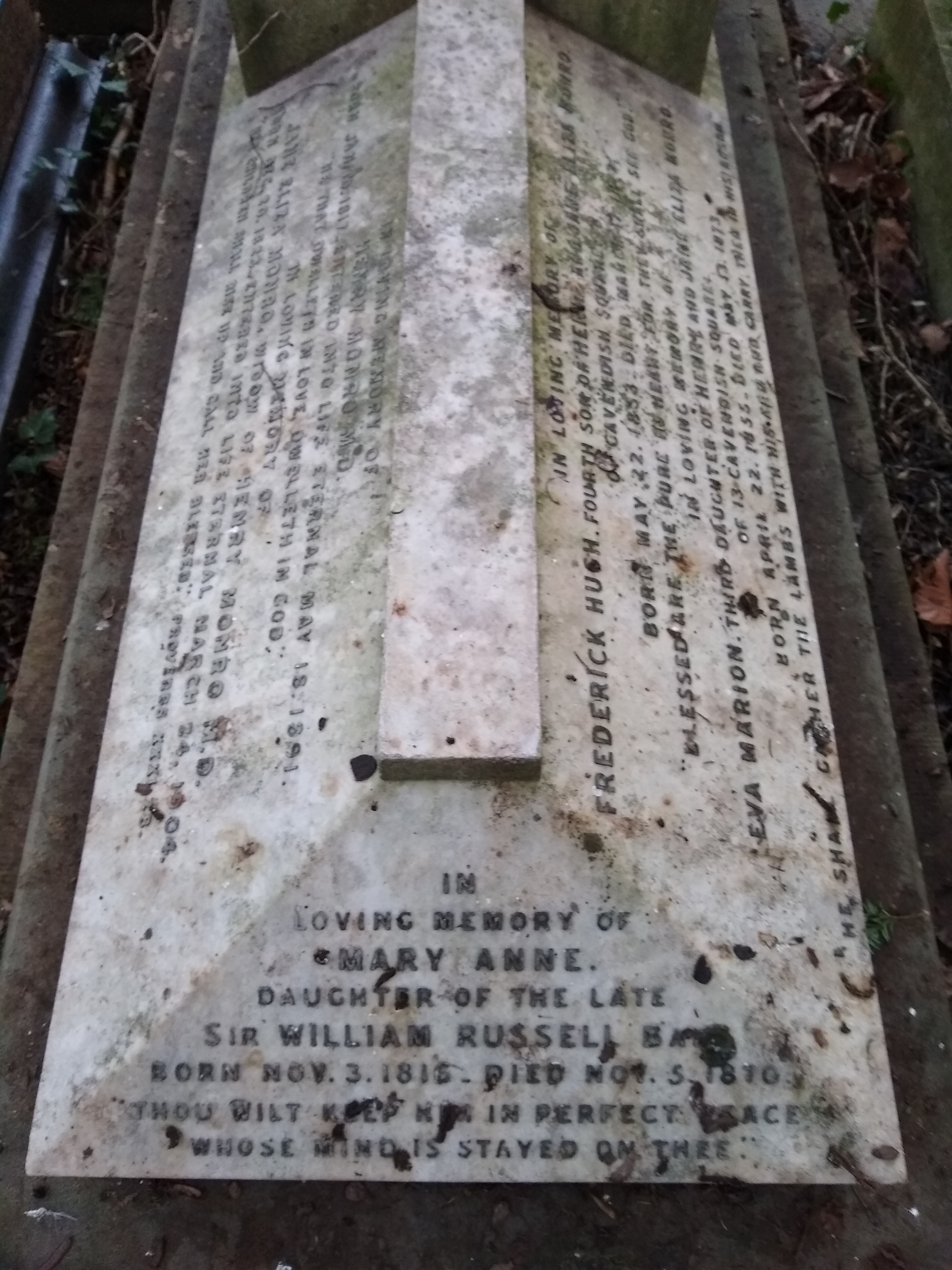
Russell family vault at Highgate Cemetery (West side)

== Military career ==
Russell entered the army as a Cornet in 1841, became a Lieutenant in February 1846, a captain in April 1857, a Major in August 1857, a lieutenant-colonel in November 1858, and colonel in July 1863.

In April 1854, Sir William of the 7th Hussars was appointed as Aide-de-Camp to the Earl of St Germans, Lord Lieutenant of Ireland. He served in the Crimean War and during the Indian Rebellion of 1857 he served at Alumbagh and at the Siege of Lucknow, and commanded the 7th Hussars on further operations in India and Nepal. He received a medal and clasp, and was made a Companion of the Order of the Bath (CB) in 1859.

== Political career ==
He was elected at the 1857 general election as a Member of Parliament (MP) for Dover, but lost the seat at the 1859 general election. He returned to the House of Commons the following year when he was elected at a by-election in March 1860 as one of the two MPs for Norwich, after an election petition had led to the 1859 election in Norwich being declared void. He was re-elected in 1865 and in 1868, and held the seat until he retired from Parliament at the 1874 general election.

== Family ==
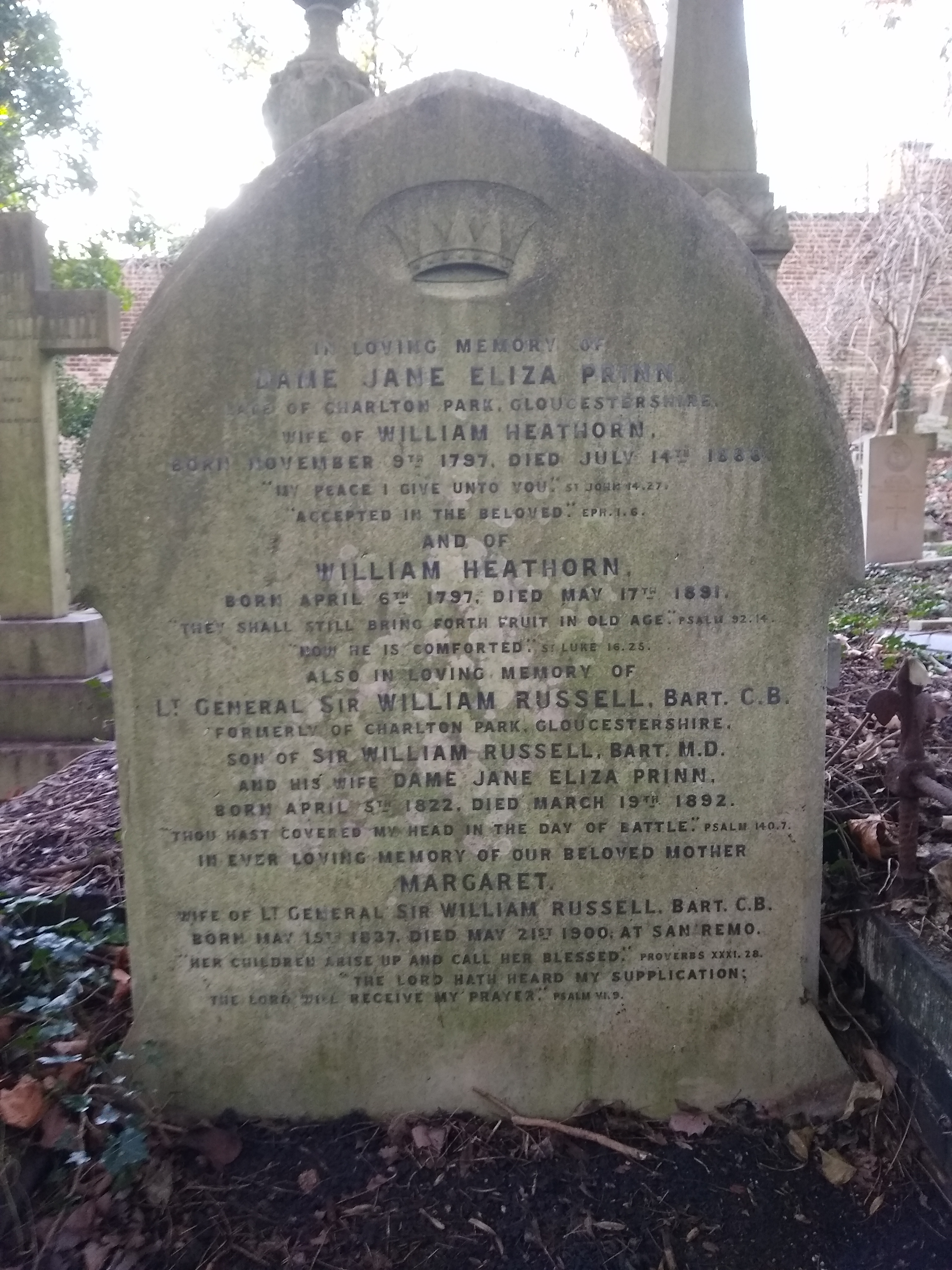
Tombstone at Highgate Cemetery (West side)

In 1863, Russell married Margaret Wilson, the only child of Robert Wilson. By 1870 they had two children: William (born 28 Sept 1865) and Margaret Jane (born 21 August 1867). They are buried at Highgate Cemetery

== Titles ==
Russell succeeded to his father's baronetcy in 1839, and on his death in 1892, aged 69, he was succeeded in the title by his own son William Russell (1865–1915), on whose death the title became extinct.

Parliament of the United Kingdom
Preceded by Viscount Chelsea; Edward Royd Rice	Member of Parliament for Dover; 1857–1859; With: Ralph Bernal Osborne	Succeeded by William Nicol; Henry John Leeke
Preceded by Henry Schneider; Viscount Bury	Member of Parliament for Norwich; 1860–1874; With: Edward Warner 1860–1868; Sir Henry Stracey, Bt 1868–1870; Jacob Henry Tillett 1870–1871; Jeremiah Colman 1871–1874	Succeeded by John Walter Huddleston; Jeremiah Colman
Baronetage of the United Kingdom
Preceded by William Russell	Baronet of Charlton Park; 1839–1892	Succeeded by William Russell
