= William Denny (MP) =

English lawyer and politician

Sir William Denny (c. 1578 – 26 March 1642) was an English lawyer and politician who sat in the House of Commons between 1621 and 1625.

Denny was born at Beccles, Suffolk the son of John Denny, a yeoman. He was at school at Beccles under Mr Darley and was admitted at Caius College, Cambridge on 26 October 1594 aged 16. He was a scholar in 1596 and was admitted at Gray's Inn in 1598. He became Steward of Norwich in 1618. In 1621, he was elected Member of Parliament for Norwich. He became an Ancient of his Inn in 1622. In 1624 he was re-elected MP for Norwich and was re-elected again in 1625. In 1625 he became autumn reader. He was knighted on 31 October 1627 and became King's Counsel. He was Recorder from 1629 to 1642.

Denny died at the age of about 64 and was buried in Norwich Cathedral near the entrance of the confessionary.

Denny married Frances Taverner daughter of James Taverner.

Parliament of England
| Preceded by Thomas Herne; Rice Gwyn | Member of Parliament for Norwich; 1621–1625; With: Richard Rosse 1621–1622; Sir Thomas Hyrne 1624–1625 | Succeeded by Sir Thomas Hyrne; Sir John Suckling |
