= 1871 Norwich by-election =

UK Parliamentary by-election

The 1871 Norwich by-election was fought on 22 February 1871. The by-election was fought due to the void election of the incumbent MP of the Liberal Party, Jacob Henry Tillett. It was won by the Liberal candidate Jeremiah James Colman.
