= William Barnham =

English politician

William Barnham (1606 - March 1675) was a mayor of Norwich and an English politician who sat in the House of Commons in 1659 and 1660.

== Early life ==
Barnham was probably born in Thetford, the son of Peter Barnham (b. 1544) of that city. The suggestion that he was a son of Sir Francis Barnham of Hollingbourne and his wife Elizabeth Leonard, daughter of Sampson Lennard is an error. The subject of this entry has sometimes been confused with both William Barnham (b. 1613) and with his own grand nephew William Barnham, esquire (1651-1718), based upon their supposed tenure as mayor of Norwich. However, neither of them held that office. The statement that William was baptised at Saint Martin-in-the-Fields on 19 May 1613 is also unlikely, based upon the year and place of his birth, and probably refers to William Barnham (b. 1613) of Boughton Monchelsey, Kent.

== Career as politician ==
He was a hosier of Norwich and became an alderman. He was mayor of Norwich in 1652. A parliamentary sympathizer in the Civil War, he held municipal office from 1646 and throughout the Interregnum, and was returned to Richard Cromwell's Parliament for the city. In 1659, Barnham was elected Member of Parliament for Norwich in the Third Protectorate Parliament. He signed the address to George Monck, 1st Duke of Albemarle for a free Parliament, and in 1660 he was elected without contest as MP for Norwich in the Convention Parliament. He stood for parliament in 1661 but came third in the poll. He was listed by Lord Wharton as a friend, but his only known activity in the Convention was on the committee to encourage shipping and woollen manufactures. He was heavily defeated at the general election, and displaced as alderman by the commissioners for corporations, although he had subscribed £8 to the voluntary gift to the King. Several times re-elected, he never resumed office because, as a hard-shell Presbyterian, he would not renounce the Covenant. After extensive charitable bequests to Thetford, he left property in Horsham St., Faith and Beeston to two kinsmen, Thomas and John Barnham [N.B., probably his nephews, sons of his brother Thomas]. The latter was court candidate for Norwich in 1688, but no other member of his family entered Parliament.

== Marriages and later life ==
William married (1) unknown, (2) Elizabeth Windham, of Stokesby with Herringsby, Norfolk, England; buried 30 Dec 1690 in Saint John Maddermarket, Norwich, Norfolk, England and (3) Mary Booty, of Hardingham, Norfolk, England, widow of Francis Booty and daughter of Rev. William Grigson, rector of Hardingham; d.s.p., buried 23 May 1659 in Saint John Maddermarket, Norwich, Norfolk, England. Barnham died at the age of 61 and was buried 22 Mar 1675 at the church of Saint John Maddermarket, Norwich, Norfolk, England.

Parliament of England
Preceded by John Hobart; Bernard Church	Member of Parliament for Norwich; 1659; With: John Hobart	Succeeded by Thomas Atkins
