= Simon Bowde =

English politician

Simon Bowde (died 1595) of Norwich, Norfolk, was an English politician.

He was a Member of Parliament (MP) for Norwich in 1584 and mayor of the city in 1579–80.
