= Robert Baxter (MP) =

English politician (died 1431)

Robert Baxter (died 1431) was an English politician. He sat as MP for Norwich in 1420 and May 1421.

He also served as chamberlain of Norwich from Michaelmas 1415 till 1416; Sheriff of Norwich from 1418 till 1419; Mayor of Norwich from 1 May 1424 till 1425 and 1429 till 1430; commissioner of gaol delivery in Norwich in November 1423, April 1428, January 1429 and April 1430; and commissioner to assess liability to contribute a subsidy in April 1431.

He married Christine and had one son and one daughter.
