= Benjamin Smith (Whig politician) =

British Whig politician (1783–1860)

Benjamin Leigh Smith (1783 – 12 April 1860) was a British Whig politician who represented the constituencies of Sudbury and Norwich.

Smith was one of five sons and five daughters of William Smith, the famous MP and abolitionist. Of his sisters, Frances (Fanny) Smith, married into the Nightingale family and produced a daughter, Florence Nightingale, a nurse and statistician; another married into the Bonham Carter family. William Smith wanted his son Benjamin to marry Mary Shore, the sister of William Nightingale, now a relative by marriage (she later married Benjamin's brother Samuel).

His home was in Marylebone, London, but in 1816 he inherited and purchased property near Hastings: Brown's Farm near Robertsbridge, with a house built around 1700 (extant), and Crowham Manor, Westfield, which included 200 acres (0.81 km^{2}). Although a member of the landed gentry, Smith held radical views. He was a Dissenter, a Unitarian, a supporter of free trade, and a benefactor to the poor. In 1826, he bore the cost of building a school for the inner-city poor at Vincent Square, Westminster, and paid a penny a week towards the fees for each child, the same amount as paid by their parents.

On a visit to a sister in Derbyshire in 1826, Benjamin met Anne Longden. She became pregnant by him and he took her to a rented lodge at Whatlington, a small village near Battle, East Sussex. There she lived as "Mrs Leigh", the surname of his relations on the Isle of Wight. The birth of their first child, Barbara (the future founder of Girton College as Barbara Bodichon), created a scandal because the couple did not marry; illegitimacy carried a heavy social stigma at the time. He rode from Brown's Farm to visit them daily, and within eight weeks Anne was pregnant again. When their son Benjamin was born, the four of them went to America for two years, during which time another child was conceived.

After their return to Sussex, they lived openly together at Brown's Farm and had two more children. After their last child was born in 1833, Anne became ill with tuberculosis and Smith leased 9 Pelham Crescent, which faced the sea at Hastings; the healthy properties of sea air were highly regarded at the time. A local woman, Hannah Walker, was employed to look after the children. Anne did not recover, so Smith took her to Ryde, Isle of Wight, where she died in 1834.

In the 1835 United Kingdom general election he was elected MP for Sudbury. In the 1837 general election he stood in Norwich; Robert Scarlett was initially declared re-elected but on petition his election was declared void and Smith was seated in his place after scrutiny of the votes.

He died on 12 April 1860, at 5 Blandford Square in Marylebone.

Parliament of the United Kingdom
Preceded by Sir John Walsh; Sir Edward Barnes	Member of Parliament for Sudbury; 1835–1837; With: John Bagshaw	Succeeded by Sir James Hamilton; Sir Edward Barnes
Preceded by Hon. Robert Scarlett; Marquess of Douro	Member of Parliament for Norwich; 1838–1847; With: Marquess of Douro	Succeeded by Marquess of Douro; Morton Peto
