= Henry Schneider =

British businessman (1817-1887)

Henry William Schneider (12 May 1817 – 11 November 1887) was a British industrialist, and politician, who played a leading role in the development of the new town of Barrow-in-Furness.

== Biography ==
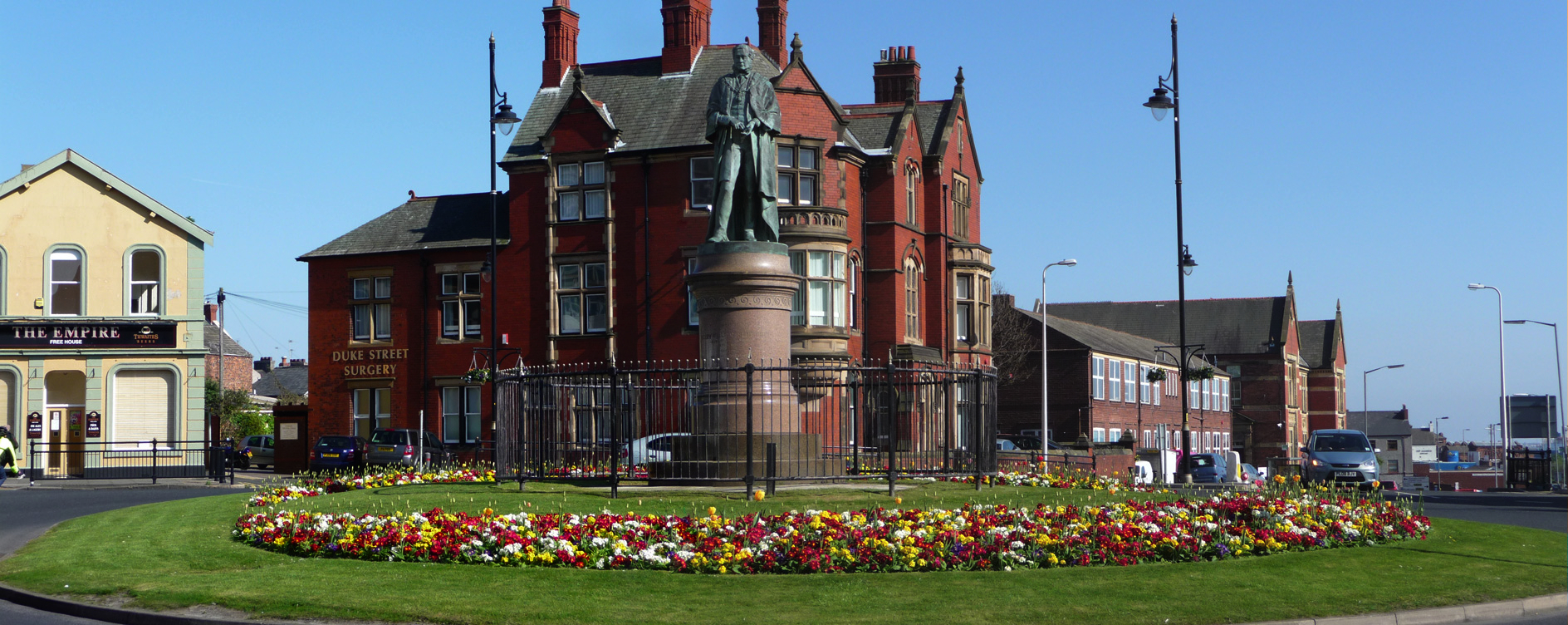
Schneider Square, Barrow-in-Furness

Henry Schneider was the son of John Henry Powell Schneider, of Swiss background. He arrived in Barrow-in-Furness in 1839 as a speculator and dealer in iron. He took over the Whiteriggs iron mine and other ore deposits. His breakthrough in Furness was the discovery of the massive Burlington iron ore mine near Askam in 1851.

He and other investors including James Ramsden founded the Furness Railway, the first section of which opened in 1846. He decided to build furnaces in the town, in partnership with John Hannay. Schneider's iron company later merged with one founded by Ramsden to form the Barrow Hematite Steel Company and the two magnates oversaw the construction in 1859 of what was then the largest Bessemer process steelworks in the world, employing more than 5,000 workers.

He was elected Liberal MP for Norwich from 27 March 1857 to 31 July 1859 and was later MP for Lancaster from 20 February 1865 to 31 December 1866, but was disqualified when it was found that he had bribed voters.

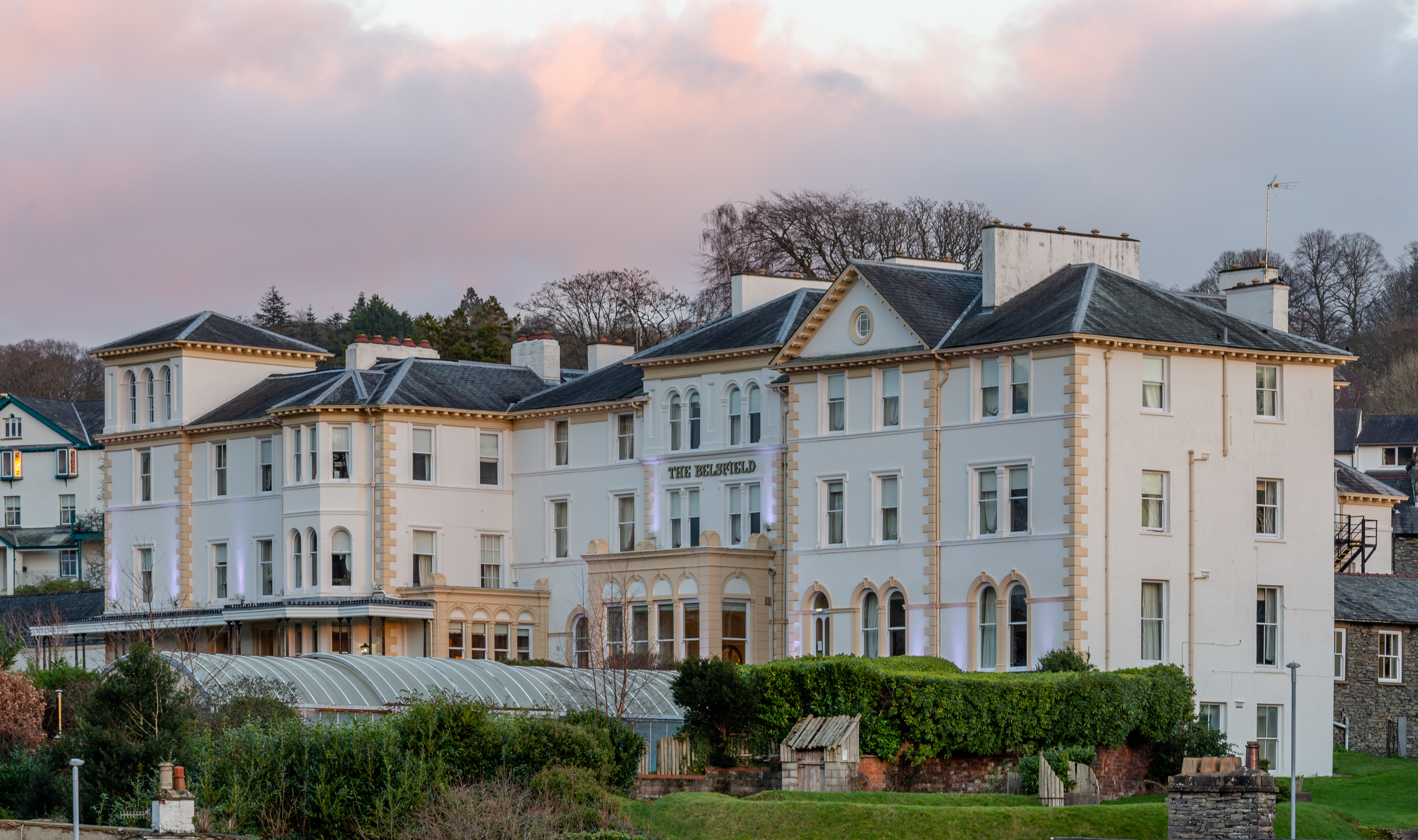
Belsfield House, now the Belsfield Hotel

While chairman of the Barrow Steelworks, he lived at Belsfield House on the shore of Windermere. Every morning he left home and travelled on his steam yacht SL Esperance, on which he had breakfast, across the lake to Lakeside. From there he would travel by train in his private carriage to his office in Barrow. The Esperance is preserved in the Windermere Jetty Museum of Steam, Boats and Stories. It became the model for Captain Flint's houseboat in Arthur Ransome's Swallows and Amazons.

He had other homes in the area at Roa Island, next to the lifeboat station, later used as a fisheries centre and at Oak Lea, near Sowerby Woods, which burnt down in mysterious circumstances in 1913.

A statue of Schneider, erected in 1891, stands on Schneider Square, Barrow-in-Furness near the town hall.

Parliament of the United Kingdom
Preceded by Edward Warner; Sir Samuel Bignold	Member of Parliament for Norwich; 1857–1859; With: Viscount Bury	Succeeded by Edward Warner; Sir William Russell, Bt
Preceded by Samuel Gregson; Edward Matthew Fenwick	Member of Parliament for Lancaster; 1865 – 1867; With: Edward Matthew Fenwick	Vacant Constituency disfranchised for corruption Title next held by George Marton
