= 1917 Norwich by-election =

UK Parliamentary by-election

The 1917 Norwich by-election was held on 26 August 1917. The by-election was held due to the incumbent Labour MP, George Roberts, becoming Minister of Labour.

The Norwich Labour Party and Trades Council repudiated Roberts because he accepted office in the Coalition Government. However, the National Executive of the Labour Party endorsed him, so he stood as an official Labour Party candidate. Due to the wartime electoral truce between the main parties, Roberts was returned unopposed.

== Result ==
1917 Norwich by-election (1 seat)
Party	Candidate	Votes	%	±%
Labour	George Henry Roberts	Unopposed		
Labour hold				
