= Bartholomew Appleyard (elder) =

English politician (died 1386)

Bartholomew Appleyard (died 1386) was an English politician. He sat as MP for Norwich in 1374 and 1412 and also served as bailiff of Norwich three times including in 1372.

He was a benefactor to St. Andrew's church in Norwich where he was buried.

== Family ==
Bartholomew Appleyard was descended from Richard Appleyard, the son of William de Applegart.

He had a son by his wife Emma, William Appleyard who also sat as MP for Norwich.
