= Reginald Lytilprowe =

16th-century English politician

Reginald Lytilprowe (by 1491 – 1536/1537), of Norwich, Norfolk, was an English politician.

He was a Member of Parliament (MP) for Norwich in 1529 and mayor of the city in 1532–33.
