= Henry Ward (barrister) =

16th-century English politician and barrister

Henry Ward (c. 1519 – 1556), of Gray's Inn, London and Kirby Bedon and Postwick, Norfolk, was an English barrister.

In April 1554 he was elected as one of the two Members of Parliament for Norwich.
