= Henry Stracey =

British politician

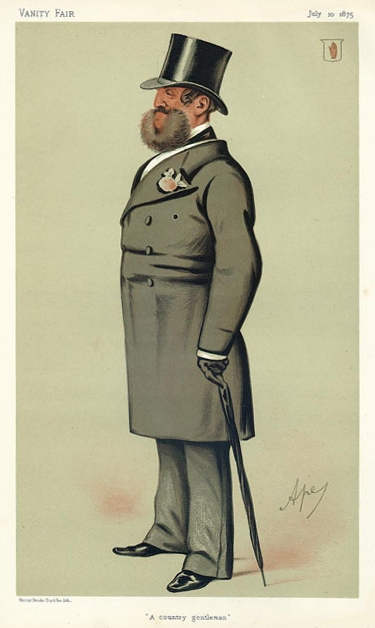
Sir Henry Stracey portrayed in Vanity Fair magazine in 1875, with the caption a country gentleman

Sir Henry Josias Stracey, 5th Baronet (31 July 1802 – 7 August 1885) was a British Conservative Party politician.

He was a Member of Parliament for East Norfolk from 1855 to 1857, for Great Yarmouth from 1859 to 1865, and for Norwich from 1868 to 1869.

Parliament of the United Kingdom
Preceded by Henry Burroughes; Edmond Wodehouse	Member of Parliament for East Norfolk; 1855–1857; With: Henry Burroughes	Succeeded by Charles Ash Windham; Sir Edward Buxton, Bt
Preceded by John Mellor; William McCullagh Torrens	Member of Parliament for Great Yarmouth; 1859–1865; With: Sir Edmund Lacon, Bt	Succeeded by Sir Edmund Lacon, Bt; James Goodson
Preceded by Edward Warner; Sir William Russell, Bt	Member of Parliament for Norwich; 1868–1869; With: Sir William Russell, Bt	Succeeded by Sir William Russell, Bt; Jacob Henry Tillett
Baronetage of the United Kingdom
Preceded by Josias Henry Stracey	Baronet (of Rackheath); 1855–1885	Succeeded by Edward Henry Gervase Stracey
