= Robert Harydance =

16th-century English politician

Robert Harydance (by 1464–1514), of Norwich, Norfolk, was an English politician.

He was a member of parliament for Norwich in 1512. Before his election, he served as an alderman in Norwich. He also practiced medicine in the city and likely contributed to the Physicians and Surgeons Act 1511.
