= John Alderford =

English politician

John Alderford (fl. 1397–1432) was an English politician. He sat as MP for Norwich in 1406, February 1413, April 1414, and 1427.

== Offices held ==
He also served as attorney for the city of Norwich by Michaelmas 1406 till c. 1425, escheator of Norfolk and Suffolk from 23 November 1419 till 16 November 1420, clerk of the statue merchant in Norwich from 9 July 1423 till possibly his death, sheriff of Norwich from Michaelmas 1428 till 1429.

He also served as commissioner of inquiry in Norfolk in July 1410 concerning misprisions and extortions, in November 1415 concerning treasons and felonies, in March and June 1421 concerning the claim of Joan, Lady Cobham to the manor of Burnham. He served as commissioner of inquiry in Suffolk in July 1421 concerning an assault on an official of the Duchy of Lancaster, commissioner of array in Norfolk in April 1418, in Norwich in March 1419, commissioner to raise royal loans in Norfolk in November 1419, commissioner to collect a subsidy in Norwich in April 1428, and commissioner of gaol delivery in April 1428.

== Family ==
He was possibly the son of Peter Alderford of Norwich. Before December 1418, he married Alice (died 1445), the daughter of Sir Ralph Shelton and they had no children.
