= Thomas Parker (died 1570) =

English politician

Thomas Parker (ca. 1510 – 1570), of Norwich, Norfolk, was an English politician and haberdasher.

He was a member of parliament (MP) for Norwich and mayor of the city in 1568–69.
