= William Ampulford =

English MP, town clerk, and tax collector

William Ampulford (died 1435) was an English politician who was MP for Norwich in 1410. He was also town clerk and tax collector of that place.
