= Ernest Wild (politician) =

English politician

Mr Ernest Wild in about 1907

Sir Ernest Wild, KC (1 January 1869 – 13 September 1934) was a barrister, Judge and Conservative Party politician who served first on the London County Council, and then as a Member of Parliament.

Ernest Edward Wild was born on 1 January 1869 in Norwich, and was educated at Norwich School and Jesus College, Oxford University, before qualifying as a barrister in 1893. Practising at the bar, he was also a Judge of the Norwich Guildhall Court of Record from 1897 to 1922. He became King's Counsel in 1912.

Ernest Wild stood unsuccessfully as a Conservative Party Parliamentary candidate on four occasions, twice in Norwich, at the 1904 by-election and at the 1906 general election, and twice in West Ham North, in the December 1910 general election and in the July 1911 by-election.

From 1907 to 1910 he sat as a Municipal Reform Party member of the London County Council representing the Finsbury division of Holborn.

He was knighted “for public services” in the June 1918 King's Birthday Honours.

At the 1918 General Election Sir Ernest was elected as member for Upton division of West Ham, standing as a Conservative supporter of David Lloyd George's coalition Government. In March 1922 he was appointed Recorder of London, the senior presiding judge at the Old Bailey, the Central Criminal Court of England and Wales. This caused controversy, because most judgeships, being "offices of profit under the Crown", disqualified one from the Commons, whereas the Recorder was appointed not by the Crown but by the City of London Corporation. The Lord Chancellor expressed the opinion that Wild should vacate his seat at "some comparatively early but convenient date" and he duly stood down as MP at the November 1922 election. He remained Recorder of London until his death on 13 September 1934 at the age of 65.

Sir Ernest Wild was an active Freemason, and in 1928 was appointed the Senior Grand Deacon of the Grand Lodge of England.
