= Samuel Bignold =

British businessman and Conservative politician

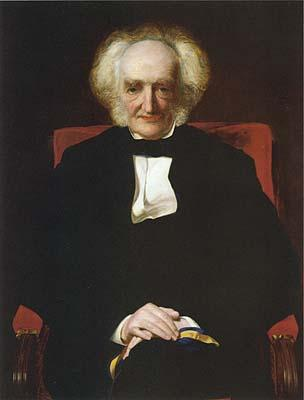
Portrait (1874) of Sir Samuel Bignold (1791–1895), by Frederick Sandys (1829–1904)

Sir Samuel Bignold DL (13 October 1791 – 2 January 1875) was a British businessman with insurances and Conservative politician.

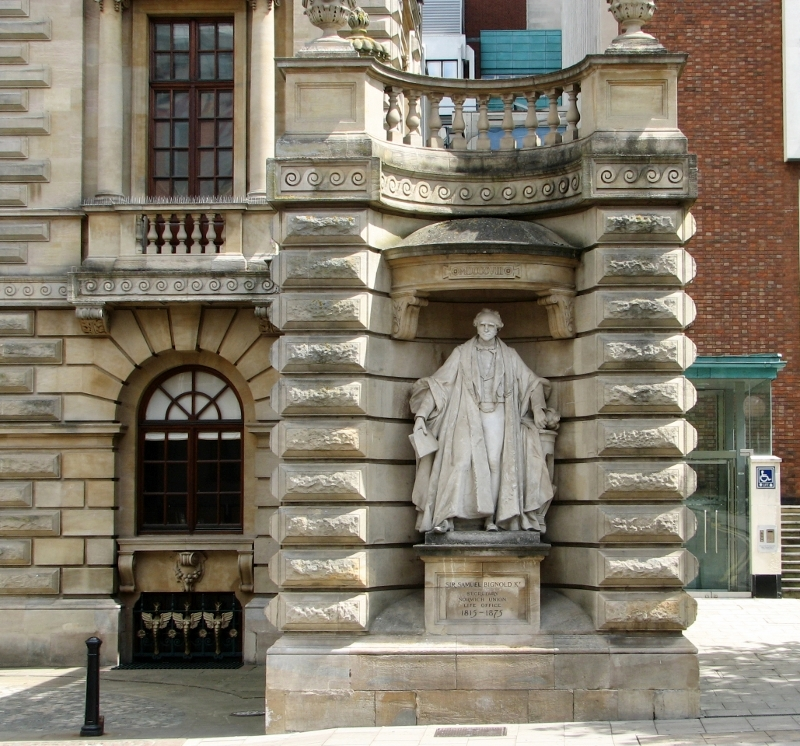
Statue of Sir Samuel Bignold at Surrey House, Norwich

== Background ==
Born in Norwich, he was the third and youngest son of Thomas Bignold and his wife Sarah, widow of Julius Long and daughter of Samuel Cocksedge. He was educated at schools in Norwich and Bury St Edmunds.

== Career ==
From 1814, he worked as secretary for the Norwich Union Fire Insurance Company and from 1818 had the same office for the Norwich Union Life Assurance Society, both founded by his father. Although an admirer of Benjamin Disraeli, he rejected the latter's rather dubious request of a loan by the Society; however, after a meeting lent the money from personal funds. In 1866, he arranged the incorporation of the Amicable Society, Britain's oldest life insurance institution.

Bignold was appointed Sheriff of Norwich in 1830 and was mayor of that city in the years 1833, 1848, 1853 and lastly 1872. He presented a note of support of the Crimean War from the city of Norwich to the Parliament in 1854, for which he was created a Knight Bachelor. Shortly thereafter, he entered the British House of Commons and sat for Norwich in the following three years. Bignold served as Deputy Lieutenant of Norfolk.

== Family ==
In 1815, he married Elizabeth, the only child of William Atkins and had by her six sons and seven daughters. He died in 1875 at Bignold House, which he had bought in 1820 and then had become his head office, and was buried at St Margaret, Old Catton. He left property worth about £120,000 (probate granted 15 February 1875).

Bignold's fourth son, Lieutenant-Colonel Charles Bignold (1831–1895) served as Mayor of Norwich between 1894 and 1895, Deputy Lieutenant of Norfolk, and leader of the Conservative Party in that city after 1875.

Parliament of the United Kingdom
Preceded by Edward Warner; Morton Peto	Member of Parliament for Norwich; 1854–1857; With: Edward Warner	Succeeded by Henry Schneider; Viscount Bury
