= Walter Niche =

English Member of Parliament

Walter Niche (fl. 1386), of Norwich, Norfolk, was an English Member of Parliament (MP).

He was a Member of the Parliament of England for Norwich in 1386.
