= John Ball (16th-century MP) =

English politician

John Ball (by 1518–56), of Norwich and Scottow, Norfolk, was an English politician.

He was an MP for Norwich in April 1554.
