= John Walter Huddleston =

Irish lawyer and judge (1815–1890)

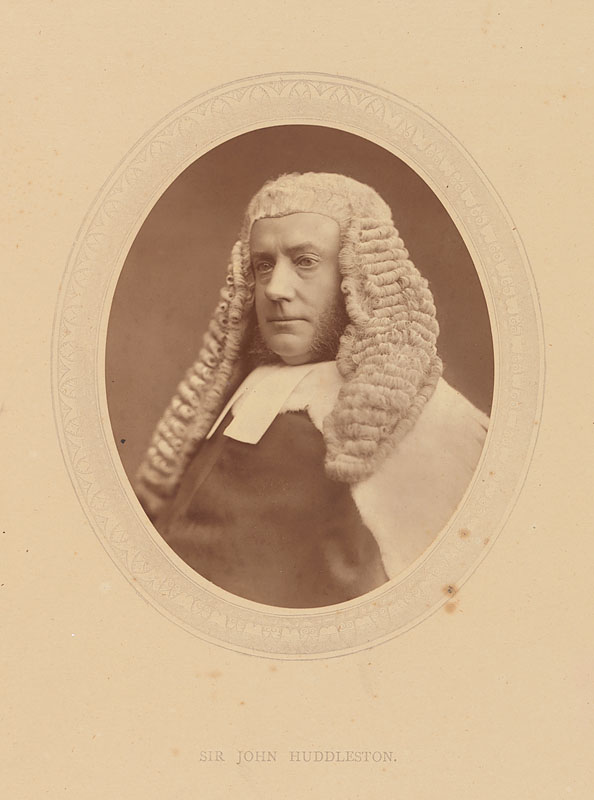
Baron Huddleston.

Sir John Walter Huddleston (8 September 1815 – 5 December 1890) was an Irish judge, formerly a criminal lawyer who had established an eminent reputation in various causes célèbres.

As a Baron of the Exchequer of Pleas, he was styled Baron Huddleston, in writing, Huddleston B. Soon after his appointment, the Exchequer was absorbed into the High Court of Justice and the style abolished. He sometimes referred to himself as "The last of the Barons."

Today, the case he presided over that remains famous is Whistler v. Ruskin, where his wife and that of Ruskin's counsel sat beside him on the bench.

== Personal life ==
Huddleston was the eldest son of Thomas, a Merchant Navy officer and Alethea née Hichens. He was born and educated in Dublin, attending Trinity College Dublin, but he did not graduate.

In 1872, he married Diana de Vere Beauclerk (1842–1905), daughter of William Beauclerk, 9th Duke of St Albans. Huddleston enjoyed theatre and horse racing. He was well read and fluent in French, giving an oration at the funeral of Pierre Antoine Berryer.

He suffered from chronic ill health during the last decade of his life before he died, aged 75, in South Kensington on 5 September 1890, with an expressed wish that he be buried with his wife. He was cremated at Woking Crematorium.

She never recovered from the loss of her husband in 1890, and everywhere she went the ashes of the Baron, who was cremated at Woking, accompanied her. The small bronze urn containing them always rested on a table beside her bed.

== Career ==
He worked for a while at a public school before entering Gray's Inn in 1836 to train as a barrister. He was called to the bar in 1839.

Initially practising on the Oxford circuit specialising in poor law cases, he developed his criminal practice at the Middlesex quarter sessions and at the Old Bailey, notably in the prosecution of William Palmer. He defended William Cuffay the chartist in 1848, and secured the acquittal of Mercy Catherine Newton, on her third trial for matricide, in 1859 and of Edmund Pook for the murder of Jane Clouson in 1871. He became a QC in 1857 and a bencher of Gray's Inn, being Treasurer in 1859 and 1868.

Huddleston made several unsuccessful attempts to enter politics, ultimately being elected as Conservative Member of Parliament for Canterbury in 1865. He lost his seat in 1868 but won again in Norwich in 1874.

Huddleston was Judge Advocate of the Fleet from 1865 to 1875, alongside appointment as a serjeant-at-law and the receiving of a knighthood. He was also made a judge of the Court of Common Pleas, which position was almost immediately transferred to the Exchequer and then to the Exchequer Division of the High Court. Huddleston's reputation as a judge never matched his standing as an advocate. As a judge, he was opinionated and unafraid to exert a strong influence on juries. He was reputed to wear colour-coded gloves to court: black for murder, lavender for breach of promise of marriage and white for more conventional cases.

In 1884 Huddleston was judge at first instance in the leading maritime case of R v. Dudley and Stephens involving murder, cannibalism and the defence of necessity. He was further central to engineering the judicially approved guilty verdict against the instincts of the jury.

== Bibliography ==
- Obituary – The Times 6, 9 & 12 December 1890
- "Huddleston, John Walter" . Dictionary of National Biography. London: Smith, Elder & Co. 1885–1900.
- Rigg, Rev. Metcalfe, E. (2004) "Huddleston, Sir John Walter (1815–1890)", Oxford Dictionary of National Biography, Oxford University Press, accessed 4 July 2007 (subscription, Wikipedia Library access or UK public library membership required)
- Sainty, J. C. (1975). Admiralty Officials 1660-1870. Athlone Press, University of London. p. 80. ISBN 0485171449.
- Simpson, A. W. B. (1984). Cannibalism and the Common Law: The Story of the Tragic Last Voyage of the Mignonette and the Strange Legal Proceedings to Which It Gave Rise. Chicago: University of Chicago Press. ISBN 978-0-226-75942-5.

Parliament of the United Kingdom
Preceded by Sir William Somerville, Bt; Henry Munro-Butler-Johnstone	Member of Parliament for Canterbury; 1865 – 1868; With: Henry Munro-Butler-Johnstone	Succeeded by Theodore Henry Brinckman; Henry Munro-Butler-Johnstone
Preceded by Sir William Russell, Bt; Jeremiah James Colman	Member of Parliament for Norwich; 1874 – 1875; With: Jeremiah James Colman	Succeeded by Jacob Henry Tillett; Jeremiah James Colman
