= Thomas Grey (Norwich MP) =

16th-century English politician

Thomas Grey (by 1519–1558), of Norwich, Norfolk, was an English politician.

He was a member of parliament (MP) for Norwich in 1555.
