= Alexander Mather =

16th-century English politician

Alexander Mather (by 1517 – 12 September 1558), of Norwich, Norfolk, was an English politician.

He was a member of parliament (MP) for Norwich from 1553 to 1554.
