= Thomas Egerton (mercer) =

Member of the Parliament of England (1521 – 1590/97)

- Born: 1521
- Died: 1590/97
- Occupation: Merchant

Thomas Egerton (by 1521 – 1590/97) was a London merchant and member of the Worshipful Company of Mercers.

He served as Under-Treasurer of the Royal Mint at the Tower of London from 1552 to 1555. In this capacity, he and John Godsalve issued the double-faced shillings of Philip and Mary. However he was held to have unduly profited from a silver-buying contract and was dismissed in December 1555; he would spend the rest of his life in debt to the Crown.

His family obtained his election as member of parliament for Newcastle-under-Lyme in 1558, to help him defend himself from his creditors (MPs enjoyed Parliamentary privilege against arrest for debt). However, when Parliament was prorogued he was arrested and committed to the Fleet prison. With the help of the Speaker, William Cordell, Egerton obtained his release on bond to pay off his debt.

While he never succeeded in settling his debt in full, Egerton did enjoy commercial success during the remainder of his life. He was Master of the Mercers' Company in 1587, and was a founder-member of the Russia Company.
