= William Rogers (MP) =

16th-century English politician

William Rogers (1497/98 – 1553), of Norwich, Norfolk, was an English politician.

He was a Member of Parliament (MP) for Norwich in 1542 and mayor of the city in 1542–43.
