= Thomas Beaumont (died c. 1582) =

English politician

Thomas Beaumont (died c. 1582), of Norwich, Norfolk, was an English politician.

He was a Member of Parliament (MP) for Norwich in 1572.
