= Norwich (constituency) =

Parliamentary constituency in the United Kingdom, 1801–1950

- Former borough constituency for the House of Commons
- County: Norfolk
- Major settlements: Norwich

1298–1950
- Seats: Two
- Replaced by: Norwich North and Norwich South

Norwich was a borough constituency in Norfolk which was represented in the House of Commons of England from 1298 to 1707, in the House of Commons of Great Britain from 1707 to 1800, and in the House of Commons of the United Kingdom from 1801 until it was abolished for the 1950 general election. Consisting of the city of Norwich in Norfolk, it returned two members of parliament (MPs), elected by the bloc vote system.

It was replaced in 1950 by two new single-member constituencies, Norwich North and Norwich South.

== Members of Parliament ==
=== 1298–1660 ===
| Year | First member | Second member |
|---|---|---|
| 1378 | Henry Limner | |
| 1386 | Walter Niche | Walter Bixton |
| 1388 (Feb) | William Appleyard | Walter Bixton |
| 1388 (Sep) | John Moulton | Walter Bixton |
| 1390 (Jan) | Henry Limner | Walter Bixton |
| 1390 (Nov) | William Appleyard | Thomas Gerard |
| 1391 | Walter Bixton | Thomas Gerard |
| 1393 | John Moulton | William Everard |
| 1394 | Henry Limner | William Everard |
| 1395 | William Appleyard | Thomas Gerard |
| 1397 (Jan) | William Appleyard | Henry Limner |
| 1397 (Sep) | Walter Bixton | Richard White |
| 1399 | Henry Limner | Roger Blickling |
| 1401 | Edmund Warner | Walter Eaton |
| 1402 | William Appleyard | William Crakeford |
| 1404 (Jan) | William Everard | Walter Eaton |
| 1404 (Oct) | | |
| 1406 | Walter Eaton | John Alderford |
| 1407 | Walter Eaton | Robert Dunston |
| 1410 | Robert Dunston | William Ampulford |
| 1411 | Bartholomew Appleyard | Thomas Gerard |
| 1413 (Feb) | John Alderford | Bartholomew Appleyard |
| 1413 (May) | William Sedman | John Bixley |
| 1414 (Apr) | Robert Brasier | John Alderford |
| 1414 (Nov) | William Sedman | Richard Purdance |
| 1415 | John Bixley | Robert Dunston |
| 1416 (Mar) | Henry Rafman | William Sedman |
| 1416 (Oct) | William Appleyard | John Bixley |
| 1417 | Robert Brasier | Robert Dunston |
| 1419 | William Appleyard | John Bixley |
| 1420 | Robert Baxter | Robert Dunston |
| 1421 (May) | Robert Baxter | Robert Dunston |
| 1421 (Dec) | Henry Piking | Robert Dunston |
| 1485 | John Paston | |
| 1504 | Robert Burgh | |
| 1510 | ? | |
| 1512 | Robert Harydance | John Clerke I |
| 1515 | ? | |
| 1523 | ? | |
| 1529 | Edward Rede | Reginald Lytilprowe |
| 1536 | ?John Corbet II | ? |
| 1539 | Augustine Steward | John Godsalve |
| 1542 | William Rogers | ?John Godsalve |
| 1545 | Robert Rugge | Richard Catlin |
| 1547 | Augustine Steward | Richard Catlin |
| 1553 (Mar) | Thomas Marsham | Alexander Mather |
| 1553 (Oct) | Thomas Gawdy I | Richard Catlin |
| 1554 (Apr) | Henry Ward | John Ball |
| 1554 (Nov) | John Corbet II | Alexander Mather |
| 1555 | John Aldrich | Thomas Grey |
| 1558 | Sir Thomas Gawdy | Thomas Sotherton |
| 1559 | Sir William Woodhouse | Thomas Sotherton |
| 1562–3 | Robert Michell, died and repl. 1566 by John Blennerhassett | Thomas Parker |
| 1571 | John Blennerhassett | Robert Suckling |
| 1572 | John Aldirich | Thomas Beaumont, sick and repl. 1581 by Edward Flowerdew |
| 1584 | Christopher Layer | Simon Bowde |
| 1586 | Robert Suckling | Thomas Layer |
| 1588 | Francis Rugge | Thomas Gleane |
| 1593 | Robert Houghton | Robert Yarham |
| 1597 | Christopher Layer | Thomas Sotherton II |
| 1601 | Alexander Thurston | John Pettus |
| 1604–1611 | Sir Henry Hobart | John Pettus |
| 1614 | Sir Thomas Hyrne | Rice Gwyn |
| 1621–1622 | Richard Rosse | William Denny |
| 1624 | William Denny | Sir Thomas Hyrne |
| 1625 | William Denny | Sir Thomas Hyrne |
| 1626 | Sir John Suckling | Sir Thomas Hyrne |
| 1628 | Sir Peter Gleane | Robert Debney |
| 1629–1640 | No Parliaments summoned | |

=== 1640–1950 ===
| Election | 1st Member | 1st Party | 2nd Member | 2nd Party |
|---|---|---|---|---|
| April 1640 | Thomas Tooley | | Thomas Atkins | |
| November 1640 | Richard Harman | Parliamentarian | Richard Catlin | Royalist |
| January 1644 | Richard Harman | Parliamentarian | Catelyn disabled from sitting – seat vacant | |
| 1645 | Richard Harman | Parliamentarian | Erasmus Earle | |
| 1646 | Thomas Atkins | | Erasmus Earle | |
| 1653 | Norwich was unrepresented in the Barebones Parliament | | | |
| 1654 | Bernard Church | | John Hobart | |
| 1656 | Bernard Church | | John Hobart | |
| January 1659 | William Barnham | | John Hobart | |
| May 1659 | Thomas Atkins | | One seat vacant | |
| April 1660 | William Barnham | | Thomas Rant | |
| 1661 | Christopher Jay | | Francis Corie | |
| Feb 1678 | William Paston | | Francis Corie | |
| May 1678 | William Paston | | Augustine Briggs | |
| 1685 | Robert Paston | | Sir Nevill Catlin | Tory |
| 1689 | Thomas Blofield | Tory | Sir Nevill Catlin | Tory |
| 1690 | Thomas Blofield | Tory | Hugh Bokenham | |
| 1694 | Thomas Blofield | Tory | John Ward | |
| 1695 | Thomas Blofield | Tory | Francis Gardiner | |
| 1698 | Thomas Blofield | Tory | Robert Davy | |
| 1701 | Edward Clarke | Country Whig | Robert Davy | |
| 1702 | Thomas Blofield | Tory | Robert Davy | |
| 1703 | Thomas Blofield | Tory | Thomas Palgrave | |
| 1705 | Waller Bacon | | John Chambers | |
| 1710 | Robert Bene | | Richard Berney | |
| 1715 | Waller Bacon | | Robert Brightiffe | |
| 1734 | Waller Bacon | | Horatio Walpole | Whig |
| 1735 by-election | Thomas Vere | | Horatio Walpole | Whig |
| 1747 | John Hobart | | Horatio Walpole | Whig |
| June 1756 by-election | John Hobart | | Edward Bacon | |
| December 1756 by-election | (Sir) Harbord Harbord | Whig | Edward Bacon | |
| 1784 | (Sir) Harbord Harbord | Whig | William Windham | Tory |
| 1786 by-election | Hon. Henry Hobart | Tory | William Windham | Tory |
| 1799 by-election | John Frere | Tory | William Windham | Tory |
| 1802 | Robert Fellowes | Whig | William Smith | Radical |
| 1806 | Robert Fellowes | Whig | John Patteson | Tory |
| 1807 | William Smith | Radical | John Patteson | Tory |
| 1812 | William Smith | Radical | Charles Harvey | Tory |
| 1818 | William Smith | Radical | Richard Hanbury Gurney | Whig |
| 1826 | William Smith | Radical | Jonathan Peel | Tory |
| 1830 | Robert Grant | Whig | Richard Hanbury Gurney | Whig |
| 1832 | William Murray | Tory | James Scarlett | Tory |
| 1834 | William Murray | Conservative | James Scarlett | Conservative |
| 1835 | William Murray | Conservative | Robert Scarlett (Note: Scarlett was initially declared re-elected in 1837, but on petition his election was declared void and his opponent, Smith, was seated in his place after scrutiny of the votes) | Conservative |
| 1837 | Arthur Wellesley | Conservative | Robert Scarlett | Conservative |
| 1838 | Arthur Wellesley | Conservative | Benjamin Smith | Whig |
| 1847 | Arthur Wellesley | Conservative | Morton Peto | Whig |
| 1852 | Edward Warner | Radical | Morton Peto | Whig |
| 1854 by-election | Edward Warner | Radical | Samuel Bignold | Conservative |
| 1857 | Henry Schneider | Radical | William Keppel | Whig |
| 1859 (Note: On petition, the result of the 1859 general election was declared void, as was that of a subsequent by-election in which Viscount Bury (who had been found guilty of bribery) had been re-elected, and a writ for a new election was issued. The result had been Lord Bury 2,154; Mr Schneider 2,138; Sir S Bignold 1,966; Mr Lushington 1,900 (Bury and Norwich Post 3 April 1860)) | Henry Schneider | Liberal | William Keppel | Liberal |
| 1860 by-election (Note: The result was Mr Warner 2,083; Sir W Russell 2,045; Mr Lewis 1,636; Mr Forlonge 1,631 (Bury and Norwich Post 3 April 1860)) | Edward Warner | Liberal | Sir William Russell, Bt | Liberal |
| 1868 | Henry Stracey (Note: Stracey's election was declared void, the writ for the constituency was suspended and a Royal Commission was appointed to investigate allegations of corruption. After its report, a writ for a by-election was issued in 1870.) | Conservative | Sir William Russell, Bt | Liberal |
| 1870 by-election | Jacob Henry Tillett (Note: On petition, Tillett's election was declared void and a new election was held.) | Liberal | Sir William Russell, Bt | Liberal |
| 1871 by-election | Jeremiah Colman | Liberal | Sir William Russell, Bt | Liberal |
| 1874 | Jeremiah Colman | Liberal | John Walter Huddleston | Conservative |
| 1875 by-election | Jeremiah Colman | Liberal | Jacob Henry Tillett (Note: Tillett's election was declared void, the writ for the constituency was suspended and a Royal Commission was appointed to investigate allegations of corruption. The seat remained vacant until the next general election, when Tillett was re-elected.) | Liberal |
| 1885 | Jeremiah Colman | Liberal | Harry Bullard (Note: On petition, Bullard's election was declared void and a by-election was held) | Conservative |
| 1886 by-election | Jeremiah Colman | Liberal | Samuel Hoare (Note: Created a baronet, August 1899) | Conservative |
| 1895 | Harry Bullard | Conservative | Samuel Hoare | Conservative |
| 1904 by-election | Louis Tillett | Liberal | Samuel Hoare | Conservative |
| 1906 | Louis Tillett | Liberal | George Roberts | Labour |
| Jan 1910 | Frederick Low | Liberal | George Roberts | Labour |
| 1915 by-election | Hilton Young | Liberal | George Roberts | Labour |
| 1916 | Hilton Young | Coalition Liberal | George Roberts | Labour |
| 1918 | Hilton Young | Coalition Liberal | George Roberts | Coalition Labour |
| Jan 1922 | Hilton Young | National Liberal | George Roberts | Coalition Labour |
| Nov 1922 | Hilton Young | National Liberal | George Roberts | Independent Labour |
| Aug 1923 | Hilton Young | National Liberal | George Roberts | Conservative |
| Nov 1923 | Hilton Young | Liberal | George Roberts | Conservative |
| Dec 1923 | Walter Smith | Labour | Dorothy Jewson | Labour |
| 1924 | Hilton Young | Liberal | J. Griffyth Fairfax | Conservative |
| 1926 | Hilton Young | Conservative | J. Griffyth Fairfax | Conservative |
| 1929 | Walter Smith | Labour | Geoffrey Shakespeare | Liberal |
| 1931 | George Hartland | Conservative | Geoffrey Shakespeare | Liberal National |
| 1935 | Henry Strauss | Conservative | Geoffrey Shakespeare | Liberal National |
| 1945 | Lucy Noel-Buxton | Labour | John Paton | Labour |
| 1950 | constituency abolished: see Norwich North and Norwich South | | | |

== Election results ==
=== Elections in the 1940s ===
General election 1945: Norwich
| Party | Candidate | Votes | % | ±% |
|---|---|---|---|---|
| Labour | Lucy Noel-Buxton | 31,553 | 27.9 | +7.9 |
| Labour | John Paton | 31,229 | 27.7 | +9.9 |
| National Liberal | Geoffrey Shakespeare | 25,945 | 23.0 | −6.1 |
| Conservative | Henry Strauss | 24,225 | 21.4 | −6.2 |
| Majority | | 5,284 | 4.7 | N/A |
| Majority | | 7,328 | 6.5 | N/A |
| Turnout | | 112,952 | 70.7 | −2.7 |
| Registered electors | | 79,880 | | |
| Labour gain from National Liberal | | | | |
| Labour gain from Conservative | | | | |

=== Elections in the 1930s ===
General election 1935: Norwich
| Party | Candidate | Votes | % | ±% |
|---|---|---|---|---|
| National Liberal | Geoffrey Shakespeare | 36,039 | 29.1 | −1.3 |
| Conservative | Henry Strauss | 34,182 | 27.6 | −1.3 |
| Labour | Glenvil Hall | 24,670 | 20.0 | −1.0 |
| Labour | Christopher John Kelly | 22,055 | 17.8 | N/A |
| Ind. Labour Party | Fenner Brockway | 6,737 | 5.5 | −14.2 |
| Majority | | 11,369 | 9.1 | −0.3 |
| Majority | | 9,512 | 7.6 | −0.3 |
| Turnout | | 123,683 | 73.4 | −7.0 |
| Registered electors | | 84,275 | | |
| National Liberal hold | | | | |
| Conservative hold | | | | |

General election 1931: Norwich
| Party | Candidate | Votes | % | ±% |
|---|---|---|---|---|
| National Liberal | Geoffrey Shakespeare | 40,925 | 30.4 | +4.2 |
| Conservative | George Hartland | 38,883 | 28.9 | +5.1 |
| Labour | Walter Smith | 28,295 | 21.0 | −5.0 |
| Ind. Labour Party | Dorothy Jewson | 26,537 | 19.7 | −4.3 |
| Majority | | 12,630 | 9.4 | N/A |
| Majority | | 10,588 | 7.9 | N/A |
| Turnout | | 132,640 | 80.4 | +1.6 |
| Registered electors | | 83,755 | | |
| National Liberal gain from Liberal | | | | |
| Conservative gain from Labour | | | | |

=== Elections in the 1920s ===
General election 1929: Norwich
| Party | Candidate | Votes | % | ±% |
|---|---|---|---|---|
| Liberal | Geoffrey Shakespeare | 33,974 | 26.2 | +1.5 |
| Labour | Walter Smith | 33,690 | 26.0 | +3.1 |
| Labour | Dorothy Jewson | 31,040 | 24.0 | +2.0 |
| Unionist | J. Griffyth Fairfax | 30,793 | 23.8 | −3.6 |
| Majority | | 2,934 | 2.2 | +0.2 |
| Majority | | 2,897 | 2.2 | N/A |
| Turnout | | 129,497 | 78.8 | −5.2 |
| Registered electors | | 82,143 | | |
| Liberal hold | | | | |
| Labour gain from Unionist | | | | |

General election 1924: Norwich
| Party | Candidate | Votes | % | ±% |
|---|---|---|---|---|
| Liberal | Hilton Young | 28,842 | 27.7 | +10.8 |
| Unionist | J. Griffyth Fairfax | 28,529 | 27.4 | +12.1 |
| Labour | Walter Smith | 23,808 | 22.9 | +2.0 |
| Labour | Dorothy Jewson | 22,931 | 22.0 | +2.0 |
| Majority | | 5,034 | 4.8 | N/A |
| Majority | | 5,598 | 5.4 | N/A |
| Turnout | | 104,110 | 84.0 | +5.3 |
| Registered electors | | 61,995 | | |
| Liberal gain from Labour | | | | |
| Unionist gain from Labour | | | | |

General election 1923: Norwich (2 seats)
| Party | Candidate | Votes | % | ±% |
|---|---|---|---|---|
| Labour | Walter Smith | 20,077 | 20.9 | +4.0 |
| Labour | Dorothy Jewson | 19,304 | 20.0 | +4.3 |
| Liberal | Hilton Young | 16,222 | 16.9 | −16.8 |
| Unionist | George Roberts | 14,749 | 15.3 | −18.4 |
| Liberal | Henry John Copeman | 13,180 | 13.7 | N/A |
| Unionist | Henry Dawes Swan | 12,713 | 13.2 | N/A |
| Majority | | 3,082 | 3.1 | N/A |
| Turnout | | 96,245 | 78.7 | +1.9 |
| Registered electors | | 61,168 | | |
| Labour gain from Independent Labour | | | | |
| Labour gain from Liberal | | | | |

Hilton Young

General election 1922: Norwich (2 seats)
| Party | Candidate | Votes | % | ±% |
|---|---|---|---|---|
| Independent Labour | George Roberts | 31,167 | 33.7 | −11.4 |
| National Liberal | Hilton Young | 31,151 | 33.7 | −9.6 |
| Labour | Herbert Witard | 15,609 | 16.9 | +5.3 |
| Labour | George Johnson | 14,490 | 15.7 | New |
| Majority | | 15,558 | 16.8 | N/A |
| Majority | | 15,542 | 16.8 | N/A |
| Turnout | | 92,417 | 76.8 | +27.9 |
| Registered electors | | 60,159 | | |
| Independent Labour hold | | | | |
| National Liberal hold | | | | |

=== Elections in the 1910s ===
General election 1918: Norwich (2 seats)
| Party | | Candidate | Votes | % | ±% |
|---|---|---|---|---|---|
| | Coalition Labour | George Roberts (Note: Roberts was not an official coalition candidate, and did not receive the Coalition Coupon) | 26,642 | 45.1 | New |
| C | National Liberal | Hilton Young | 25,555 | 43.3 | +6.9 |
| | Labour | Herbert Witard | 6,856 | 11.6 | –24.2 |
| Majority | | | 19,786 | 33.5 | +25.4 |
| Majority | | | 18,699 | 31.7 | +23.1 |
| Turnout | | | 59,053 | 48.9 | −35.4 |
| Registered electors | | | 60,342 | | |
| | Coalition Labour gain from Labour | | | | |
| | National Liberal hold | | | | |
C indicates candidate endorsed by the coalition government.

By-election, 1917: Norwich (1 seat)
| Party | Candidate | Votes | % | ±% |
|---|---|---|---|---|
| Labour | George Roberts | Unopposed | | |
| Labour hold | | | | |

By-election, 1915: Norwich (1 seat)
| Party | Candidate | Votes | % | ±% |
|---|---|---|---|---|
| Liberal | Hilton Young | Unopposed | | |
| Liberal hold | | | | |

General election, December 1910: Norwich (2 seats)
| Party | Candidate | Votes | % | ±% |
|---|---|---|---|---|
| Liberal | Frederick Low | 10,149 | 36.4 | +7.4 |
| Labour | George Roberts | 10,003 | 35.8 | +7.1 |
| Conservative | W. Dyson | 7,758 | 27.7 | +6.1 |
| Majority | | 2,391 | 8.6 | +1.3 |
| Majority | | 2,245 | 8.1 | +1.1 |
| Turnout | | 27,910 | 84.3 | −7.2 |
| Registered electors | | 21,607 | | |
| Liberal hold | | | | |
| Labour hold | | | | |

General election, January 1910: Norwich (2 seats)
| Party | Candidate | Votes | % | ±% |
|---|---|---|---|---|
| Liberal | Frederick Low | 11,257 | 29.0 | −8.2 |
| Labour | George Roberts | 11,119 | 28.7 | −9.2 |
| Conservative | Samuel Hoare | 8,410 | 21.7 | −3.6 |
| Conservative | H.G. Snowden | 7,981 | 20.6 | N/A |
| Majority | | 2,847 | 7.3 | −4.6 |
| Majority | | 2,709 | 7.0 | −5.2 |
| Turnout | | 38,767 | 91.5 | −0.1 |
| Registered electors | | 21,607 | | |
| Liberal hold | | | | |
| Labour hold | | | | |

=== Elections in the 1900s ===
General election 1906: Norwich (2 seats)
| Party | Candidate | Votes | % | ±% |
|---|---|---|---|---|
| Labour Repr. Cmte. | George Roberts | 11,059 | 37.5 | N/A |
| Liberal | Louis Tillett | 10,972 | 37.2 | N/A |
| Conservative | Ernest Wild | 7,460 | 25.3 | N/A |
| Turnout | | 29,491 | 91.6 | N/A |
| Registered electors | | 20,390 | | |
| Majority | | 3,599 | 12.2 | N/A |
| Liberal gain from Conservative | | | | |
| Majority | | 3,512 | 11.9 | N/A |
| Labour Repr. Cmte. gain from Conservative | | | | |

By-election, 1904: Norwich (2 seats)
| Party | Candidate | Votes | % | ±% |
|---|---|---|---|---|
| Liberal | Louis Tillett | 8,576 | 48.3 | New |
| Conservative | Ernest Wild | 6,756 | 38.0 | N/A |
| Labour Repr. Cmte. | George Roberts | 2,440 | 13.7 | New |
| Majority | | 1,820 | 10.3 | N/A |
| Turnout | | 17,772 | 90.1 | N/A |
| Registered electors | | 19,728 | | |
| Liberal gain from Conservative | | | | |

General election 1900: Norwich (2 seats)
| Party | Candidate | Votes | % | ±% |
|---|---|---|---|---|
| Conservative | Samuel Hoare | Unopposed | | |
| Conservative | Harry Bullard | Unopposed | | |
| Conservative hold | | | | |
| Conservative hold | | | | |

=== Elections in the 1890s ===
General election 1895: Norwich (2 seats)
| Party | Candidate | Votes | % | ±% |
|---|---|---|---|---|
| Conservative | Samuel Hoare | 8,166 | 26.5 | −8.6 |
| Conservative | Harry Bullard | 8,034 | 26.1 | N/A |
| Liberal | Thomas Terrell | 7,330 | 23.9 | −9.9 |
| Liberal | Frederick Verney | 7,210 | 23.5 | −7.6 |
| Majority | | 704 | 2.2 | N/A |
| Turnout | | 15,465 (est) | 88.4 | +0.4 |
| Registered electors | | 17,494 | | |
| Conservative hold | | | | |
| Conservative gain from Liberal | | | | |

General election 1892: Norwich (2 seats)
| Party | Candidate | Votes | % | ±% |
|---|---|---|---|---|
| Conservative | Samuel Hoare | 7,718 | 35.1 | +9.6 |
| Liberal | Jeremiah Colman | 7,407 | 33.8 | +7.8 |
| Liberal | John Bedford | 6,811 | 31.1 | +5.7 |
| Majority | | 907 | 4.0 | +3.9 |
| Turnout | | 14,628 (est) | 88.0 | +7.4 |
| Registered electors | | 16,623 | | |
| Conservative hold | | | | |
| Liberal hold | | | | |

=== Elections in the 1880s ===
General election 1886: Norwich (2 seats)
| Party | Candidate | Votes | % | ±% |
|---|---|---|---|---|
| Liberal | Jeremiah Colman | 6,295 | 26.0 | −7.0 |
| Conservative | Samuel Hoare | 6,156 | 25.5 | −10.5 |
| Liberal | Jacob Henry Tillett | 6,119 | 25.4 | −5.6 |
| Conservative | Clare Sewell Read | 5,564 | 23.1 | N/A |
| Turnout | | 12,342 | 80.6 | −8.0 |
| Registered electors | | 15,323 | | |
| Majority | | 731 | 2.9 | |
| Liberal hold | | Swing | −0.9 | |
| Majority | | 37 | 0.1 | −4.9 |
| Conservative hold | | Swing | −5.4 | |

By-election, 7 Apr 1886: Norwich (Note: Harry Bullard was unseated on petition)
| Party | Candidate | Votes | % | ±% |
|---|---|---|---|---|
| Conservative | Samuel Hoare | Unopposed | | |
| Conservative hold | | | | |

- Caused by Bullard being unseated on petition.

General election 1885: Norwich (2 seats)
| Party | Candidate | Votes | % | ±% |
|---|---|---|---|---|
| Conservative | Harry Bullard | 7,279 | 36.0 | −8.1 |
| Liberal | Jeremiah Colman | 6,666 | 33.0 | +4.9 |
| Liberal | Robert Samuel Wright | 6,251 | 31.0 | +3.1 |
| Majority | | 1,028 | 5.0 | N/A |
| Turnout | | 13,572 | 88.6 | +12.6 (est) |
| Registered electors | | 15,323 | | |
| Conservative gain from Liberal | | Swing | −3.6 | |
| Liberal hold | | Swing | +4.5 | |

General election 1880: Norwich (2 seats)
| Party | Candidate | Votes | % | ±% |
|---|---|---|---|---|
| Liberal | Jeremiah Colman | 6,549 | 28.1 | +1.4 |
| Liberal | Jacob Henry Tillett | 6,512 | 27.9 | +2.8 |
| Conservative | Henry Harben | 5,242 | 22.5 | −2.8 |
| Conservative | William Massey-Mainwaring | 5,032 | 21.6 | −1.4 |
| Majority | | 1,270 | 5.4 | N/A |
| Turnout | | 11,668 (est) | 76.0 (est) | +0.1 |
| Registered electors | | 15,349 | | |
| Liberal hold | | Swing | +1.4 | |
| Liberal gain from Conservative | | Swing | +2.8 | |

=== Elections in the 1870s ===
By-election, 6 Mar 1875: Norwich (1 seat)
| Party | Candidate | Votes | % | ±% |
|---|---|---|---|---|
| Liberal | Jacob Henry Tillett | 5,877 | 53.6 | +1.8 |
| Conservative | Josiah Wilkinson | 5,079 | 46.4 | −1.9 |
| Majority | | 798 | 7.2 | N/A |
| Turnout | | 10,956 | 73.3 | −2.6 |
| Registered electors | | 14,953 | | |
| Liberal gain from Conservative | | Swing | +1.9 | |

- Caused by Huddleston's appointment as a Judge of the Court of Common Pleas. This by-election was later declared void on petition, and the writ was suspended, leaving Norwich with one MP until 1880.

General election 1874: Norwich (2 seats)
| Party | Candidate | Votes | % | ±% |
|---|---|---|---|---|
| Liberal | Jeremiah Colman | 6,138 | 26.7 | −7.0 |
| Conservative | John Walter Huddleston | 5,823 | 25.3 | +8.4 |
| Liberal | Jacob Henry Tillett | 5,776 | 25.1 | −7.5 |
| Conservative | Henry Stracey | 5,290 | 23.0 | +6.1 |
| Turnout | | 11,514 (est) | 75.9 (est) | +8.5 |
| Registered electors | | 15,166 | | |
| Majority | | 315 | 1.4 | |
| Liberal hold | | Swing | −7.1 | |
| Majority | | 47 | 0.2 | −1.0 |
| Conservative hold | | Swing | +7.8 | |

By-election, 22 Feb 1871: Norwich (1 seat)
| Party | Candidate | Votes | % | ±% |
|---|---|---|---|---|
| Liberal | Jeremiah Colman | 4,637 | 57.8 | −8.5 |
| Conservative | Charles Legard | 3,389 | 42.2 | +8.4 |
| Majority | | 1,248 | 15.6 | N/A |
| Turnout | | 8,026 | 65.1 | −2.3 |
| Registered electors | | 12,338 | | |
| Liberal gain from Conservative | | Swing | −8.5 | |

- Caused by the previous by-election being declared void on petition.

By-election, 13 Jul 1870: Norwich (1 seat)
| Party | Candidate | Votes | % | ±% |
|---|---|---|---|---|
| Liberal | Jacob Henry Tillett | 4,236 | 52.2 | −14.1 |
| Conservative | John Walter Huddleston | 3,874 | 47.8 | +14.0 |
| Majority | | 362 | 4.4 | N/A |
| Turnout | | 8,110 | 61.0 | −6.4 |
| Registered electors | | 13,296 | | |
| Liberal gain from Conservative | | Swing | −14.1 | |

- Caused by Stracey's election being declared void on petition.

=== Elections in the 1860s ===
General election 1868: Norwich (2 seats)
| Party | Candidate | Votes | % | ±% |
|---|---|---|---|---|
| Conservative | Henry Stracey | 4,521 | 33.8 | −9.6 |
| Liberal | William Russell | 4,509 | 33.7 | +5.4 |
| Liberal | Jacob Henry Tillett | 4,364 | 32.6 | +4.4 |
| Majority | | 157 | 1.2 | N/A |
| Turnout | | 9,958 (est) | 67.4 (est) | −0.2 |
| Registered electors | | 13,296 | | |
| Conservative gain from Liberal | | Swing | −9.7 | |
| Liberal hold | | Swing | +5.1 | |

General election 1865: Norwich (2 seats)
| Party | Candidate | Votes | % | ±% |
|---|---|---|---|---|
| Liberal | William Russell | 1,845 | 28.3 | +1.9 |
| Liberal | Edward Warner | 1,838 | 28.2 | +2.0 |
| Conservative | Augustus Goldsmid | 1,466 | 22.5 | −1.6 |
| Conservative | Robert Edmond Chester Waters | 1,363 | 20.9 | −2.4 |
| Majority | | 372 | 5.7 | +3.6 |
| Turnout | | 3,256 (est) | 67.6 (est) | −13.0 |
| Registered electors | | 4,817 | | |
| Liberal hold | | Swing | +2.0 | |
| Liberal hold | | Swing | +2.0 | |

By-election, 28 March 1860: Norwich (2 seats)
| Party | Candidate | Votes | % | ±% |
|---|---|---|---|---|
| Liberal | Edward Warner | 2,083 | 28.2 | +1.8 |
| Liberal | William Russell | 2,045 | 27.7 | +1.5 |
| Conservative | William Forlonge | 1,636 | 22.1 | −2.0 |
| Conservative | William David Lewis | 1,631 | 22.1 | −1.2 |
| Majority | | 409 | 5.6 | +3.5 |
| Turnout | | 3,698 (est) | 68.7 (est) | −11.9 |
| Registered electors | | 5,381 | | |
| Liberal hold | | Swing | +1.7 | |
| Liberal hold | | Swing | +1.6 | |

- Caused by both the 1859 general election and the June by-election being declared void on petition due to bribery.

=== Elections in the 1850s ===
By-election, 28 June 1859: Norwich
| Party | Candidate | Votes | % | ±% |
|---|---|---|---|---|
| Liberal | William Keppel | 1,922 | 54.6 | +2.0 |
| Conservative | Samuel Bignold | 1,561 | 44.3 | −3.1 |
| Conservative | Henry George Boldero | 39 | 1.1 | N/A |
| Majority | | 361 | 10.3 | +8.2 |
| Turnout | | 3,522 | 69.6 | −11.0 |
| Registered electors | | 5,508 | | |
| Liberal hold | | Swing | +2.6 | |

- Caused by Keppel's appointment as Treasurer of the Household.

General election 1859: Norwich (2 seats)
| Party | Candidate | Votes | % | ±% |
|---|---|---|---|---|
| Liberal | William Keppel | 2,154 | 26.4 | −10.2 |
| Liberal | Henry Schneider | 2,134 | 26.2 | −10.5 |
| Conservative | Samuel Bignold | 1,966 | 24.1 | +10.7 |
| Conservative | Charles Manners Lushington | 1,900 | 23.3 | +9.9 |
| Majority | | 168 | 2.1 | −7.8 |
| Turnout | | 4,077 (est) | 80.6 (est) | +17.8 |
| Registered electors | | 5,058 | | |
| Liberal hold | | Swing | −10.3 | |
| Liberal hold | | Swing | −10.4 | |

General election 1857: Norwich (2 seats)
| Party | Candidate | Votes | % | ±% |
|---|---|---|---|---|
| Radical | Henry Schneider | 2,247 | 36.7 | +7.7 |
| Whig | William Keppel | 2,238 | 36.6 | +7.0 |
| Conservative | Samuel Bignold | 1,636 | 26.7 | −14.6 |
| Turnout | | 3,879 (est) | 62.8 (est) | −5.8 |
| Registered electors | | 6,175 | | |
| Majority | | 9 | 0.1 | −7.4 |
| Radical hold | | Swing | +7.5 | |
| Majority | | 602 | 9.9 | +9.3 |
| Whig hold | | Swing | +7.2 | |

By-election, 29 December 1854: Norwich
| Party | Candidate | Votes | % | ±% |
|---|---|---|---|---|
| Conservative | Samuel Bignold | 1,899 | 53.8 | +12.5 |
| Whig | Anthony Hamond | 1,629 | 46.2 | +16.6 |
| Majority | | 270 | 7.6 | N/A |
| Turnout | | 3,528 | 59.7 | −8.9 |
| Registered electors | | 5,911 | | |
| Conservative gain from Whig | | Swing | −2.1 | |

- Caused by Peto's resignation in order to go to the Crimean War and construct the Grand Crimean Central Railway.

General election 1852: Norwich (2 seats)
| Party | Candidate | Votes | % | ±% |
|---|---|---|---|---|
| Whig | Morton Peto | 2,190 | 29.6 | −13.0 |
| Radical | Edward Warner | 2,145 | 29.0 | +1.6 |
| Conservative | Arthur Wellesley | 1,592 | 21.5 | +6.4 |
| Conservative | Lothian Sheffield Dickson | 1,465 | 19.8 | +4.7 |
| Turnout | | 3,696 (est) | 68.6 (est) | +10.9 |
| Registered electors | | 5,390 | | |
| Majority | | 45 | 0.6 | −11.9 |
| Whig hold | | Swing | −9.3 | |
| Majority | | 553 | 7.5 | N/A |
| Radical gain from Conservative | | Swing | −2.0 | |

=== Elections in the 1840s ===
General election 1847: Norwich (2 seats)
| Party | Candidate | Votes | % | ±% |
|---|---|---|---|---|
| Whig | Morton Peto | 2,448 | 42.6 | N/A |
| Conservative | Arthur Wellesley | 1,727 | 30.1 | N/A |
| Radical | John Humffreys Parry | 1,572 | 27.4 | N/A |
| Turnout | | 2,874 (est) | 57.7 (est) | N/A |
| Registered electors | | 4,976 | | |
| Majority | | 721 | 12.5 | N/A |
| Whig hold | | Swing | N/A | |
| Majority | | 155 | 2.7 | N/A |
| Conservative hold | | Swing | N/A | |

General election 1841: Norwich (2 seats)
| Party | Candidate | Votes | % | ±% |
|---|---|---|---|---|
| Whig | Benjamin Smith | Unopposed | | |
| Conservative | Arthur Wellesley | Unopposed | | |
| Registered electors | | 4,334 | | |
| Whig hold | | | | |
| Conservative hold | | | | |

=== Elections in the 1830s ===
General election 1837: Norwich (2 seats)
| Party | Candidate | Votes | % | ±% |
|---|---|---|---|---|
| Conservative | Robert Scarlett | 1,865 | 25.2 | −1.8 |
| Conservative | Arthur Wellesley | 1,863 | 25.2 | −2.0 |
| Whig | Benjamin Smith | 1,843 | 24.9 | +2.0 |
| Whig | Montford Nurse | 1,831 | 24.7 | +1.9 |
| Majority | | 20 | 0.3 | −3.8 |
| Turnout | | 3,697 | 84.2 | −0.7 |
| Registered electors | | 4,390 | | |
| Conservative hold | | Swing | −1.9 | |
| Conservative hold | | Swing | −2.0 | |

- On petition, Scarlett was unseated and Smith was declared elected.

General election 1835: Norwich (2 seats)
| Party | Candidate | Votes | % | ±% |
|---|---|---|---|---|
| Conservative | William Murray | 1,892 | 27.2 | +0.5 |
| Conservative | Robert Scarlett | 1,878 | 27.0 | +1.0 |
| Whig | Edward Vernon Harbord, 4th Baron Suffield | 1,592 | 22.9 | −1.1 |
| Whig | Frank Offley Martin | 1,582 | 22.8 | −0.6 |
| Majority | | 286 | 4.1 | +2.1 |
| Turnout | | 3,483 | 84.9 | −5.2 |
| Registered electors | | 4,102 | | |
| Conservative hold | | Swing | +0.7 | |
| Conservative hold | | Swing | +0.9 | |

General election 1832: Norwich (2 seats)
| Party | Candidate | Votes | % | ±% |
|---|---|---|---|---|
| Tory | William Murray | 2,016 | 26.7 | +11.1 |
| Tory | James Scarlett | 1,962 | 26.0 | +10.6 |
| Whig | Richard Hanbury Gurney | 1,809 | 24.0 | −10.5 |
| Whig | Charles Henry Bellenden Ker | 1,765 | 23.4 | −11.1 |
| Majority | | 153 | 2.0 | N/A |
| Turnout | | 3,817 | 90.1 | c. +15.6 |
| Registered electors | | 4,238 | | |
| Tory gain from Whig | | Swing | +11.0 | |
| Tory gain from Whig | | Swing | +10.7 | |

General election 1831: Norwich (2 seats)
| Party | Candidate | Votes | % | ±% |
|---|---|---|---|---|
| Whig | Robert Grant | 2,163 | 34.5 | +7.1 |
| Whig | Richard Hanbury Gurney | 2,158 | 34.5 | +6.1 |
| Tory | Charles Wetherell | 977 | 15.6 | −7.4 |
| Tory | Michael Thomas Sadler | 964 | 15.4 | −5.8 |
| Majority | | 1,181 | 18.9 | +14.5 |
| Turnout | | c. 3,131 | c. 74.5 | |
| Registered electors | | c. 4,200 | | |
| Whig hold | | Swing | +6.9 | |
| Whig hold | | Swing | +6.4 | |

- Wetherell and Sadler were proposed without their knowledge

By-election, 30 November 1830: Norwich
| Party | Candidate | Votes | % |
|---|---|---|---|
| Whig | Robert Grant | Unopposed | |
| Whig hold | | | |

- Caused by Grant's appointment as Judge Advocate General of the Armed Forces

General election 1830: Norwich (2 seats)
| Party | Candidate | Votes | % |
|---|---|---|---|
| Whig | Richard Hanbury Gurney | 2,363 | 28.4 |
| Whig | Robert Grant | 2,279 | 27.4 |
| Tory | Jonathan Peel | 1,912 | 23.0 |
| Tory | Charles Ogle | 1,762 | 21.2 |
| Majority | | 367 | 4.4 |
| Turnout | | 4,202 | |
| Whig gain from Radical | | | |
| Whig gain from Tory | | | |

== Sources ==
- Robert Beatson, A Chronological Register of Both Houses of Parliament (London: Longman, Hurst, Res & Orme, 1807)
- D Brunton & D H Pennington, Members of the Long Parliament (London: George Allen & Unwin, 1954)
- Cobbett's Parliamentary history of England, from the Norman Conquest in 1066 to the year 1803 (London: Thomas Hansard, 1808)
- The Constitutional Year Book for 1913 (London: National Union of Conservative and Unionist Associations, 1913)
- F W S Craig, British Parliamentary Election Results 1832–1885 (2nd edition, Aldershot: Parliamentary Research Services, 1989)
- Craig, F. W. S. (1983) [1969]. British parliamentary election results 1918–1949 (3rd ed.). Chichester: Parliamentary Research Services. ISBN 978-0-900178-06-1.
- Maija Jansson (ed.), Proceedings in Parliament, 1614 (House of Commons) (Philadelphia: American Philosophical Society, 1988)
- J E Neale, The Elizabethan House of Commons (London: Jonathan Cape, 1949)
- Robert Walcott, English Politics in the Early Eighteenth Century (Oxford: Oxford University Press, 1956)
- Leigh Rayment's Historical List of MPs – Constituencies beginning with "N" (part 3)
