= William Appleyard (MP) =

MP and first Mayor of Norwich

William Appleyard (died 4 September 1429) was an MP for Norwich in the House of Commons and the first Mayor of Norwich in 1403.

== Early life ==
Appleyard was born, at an unknown date, to Bartholomew Appleyard (died 1386) and his wife Emma. He is first recorded in 1367, in a court case.

== Career ==
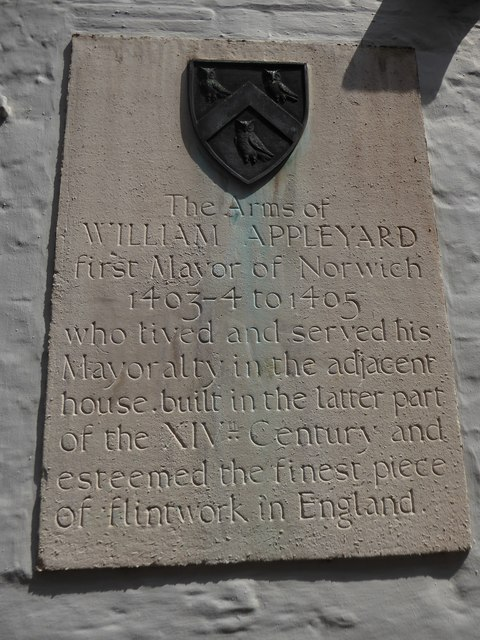
Plaque next to the Bridewell Museum commemorating William Appleyard

Appleyard was admitted as a freeman of Norwich in 1367 when his father was bailiff, possibly still as a minor. During the Peasants’ Revolt in 1381 he was named one of the eight assistants and counsellors to the bailiffs for the safeguarding of Norwich. In 1383, he was first elected to Parliament as the member for Norwich, and again in 1384, 1385, 1388, 1390, 1395, 1397, 1402, 1416 and 1419. He also served three terms as bailiff (1386–7, 1395–6, 1401–2) and five as mayor, starting in 1403 when Norwich was granted its charter (and again in 1405, 1411–13, and 1418–19).

In 1411, he presented to the town a "great tree" for the building of the new guildhall. He rebuilt his father's house, and it remains standing, now (2024) used as the Bridewell Museum.

== Personal life ==
Appleyard married twice. By 1383 he had married Margaret Clere of Ormesby St Margaret (whose brother Robert would also become an MP). He married, secondly, Margaret, daughter of John Rees, and widow of William Curson. By his first marriage he had three sons (including Bartholomew, also an MP) and three daughters. He died in 1419.
