= John Corbet (died 1559) =

English politician

John Corbet II (by 1514–1559), of Sprowston, Norfolk, was an English politician.

He was a member of parliament (MP) for Norwich in 1536 and November 1554. He was a brazier in Norwich.
