= Richard Catlyn =

16th-century English politician

Richard Catlyn (by 1520–1556), of Norwich and Honingham, Norfolk and Serjeants' Inn, London, was an English politician.

He was a member of parliament (MP) for Norwich in 1545.
