= 1870 Norwich by-election =

UK Parliamentary by-election

The 1870 Norwich by-election was fought on 13 July 1870. The by-election was fought due to the Void election of the incumbent MP of the Conservative Party, Sir Henry Stracey. It was won by the Liberal candidate Jacob Henry Tillett.
