= Jeremiah Colman (MP) =

English mustard manufacturer, philanthropist and Liberal politician

Jeremiah James Colman (14 June 1830 – 18 September 1898) was an English mustard manufacturer and the third member of the family in charge of the eponymous company Colman's. He was a popular philanthropist in his home City of Norwich and a Liberal politician who represented the city in parliament.

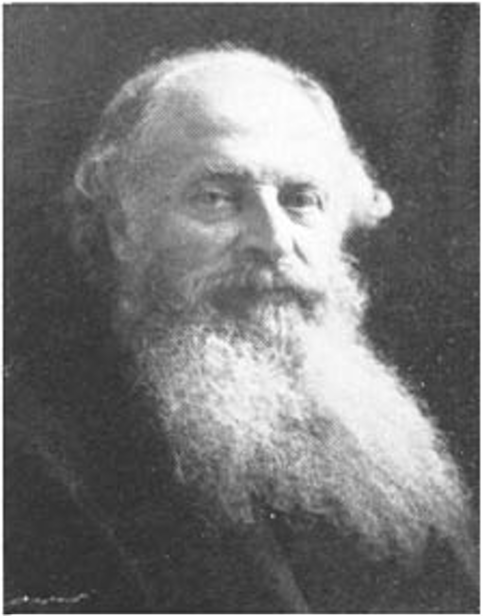
Sir Jeremiah James Colman 1830–1898, a great-nephew of the founder. Under his leadership the expansion of the firm took place from a single mill to a works employing over 3,000 people.

== Biography ==
Colman was the son of James Colman and his wife Mary Burlingham, daughter of John Burlingham of Old Buckenham. He became a partner in the family mustard business at Stoke Holy Cross in 1823 and from then on the company was called J. & J. Colman. In 1854, the firm employed 200 workers.

Jeremiah James was responsible for moving the firm to the larger Carrow Works site in 1856. The Carrow site had been bought from the Norwich Railway Company in 1850 and it was well served by road, rail and river transport. The massive expansion of Carrow Works brought steady employment to a depressed and stagnating city. By 1874 he was the master of 1,500 workers. He lived in Carrow House at the heart of the works, devoting his life to the firm and to public interests. In 1866 Jeremiah James Colman was appointed mustard maker to Queen Victoria. He also made it for Napoleon III of France, the Prince of Wales and Victor Emmanuel II of Italy. By 1893 the company had over 2,000 employees.

Colman served as a Norwich councillor from 1859 to 1871 becoming Sheriff in 1862 and Mayor in 1867. He was Leader of the Liberal party in the city, was elected as MP for Norwich in 1871 and held the seat until 1895. He was a City and County magistrate, Deputy Lieutenant in 1880 and an Alderman in 1896.

J J Colman was one of the founding members of Norwich YMCA in 1856, serving as its first treasurer until 1860. He was President of Norwich YMCA from 1860 until his death in 1898.

He served as Governor of Norwich School in 1858 and as its chairman in 1890. He was a trustee of the Municipal Charities in 1856 and its vice-chairman from 1869 - 1872. In 1893 he was made an Honorary Freeman of the city.

He championed nonconformity, and persistently urged religious freedom. His generosity, kindness and courtesy gained him the affection and support not just of his business colleagues and employees but all who came into contact with him. On the day of his funeral the city came to a complete halt and thousands were in mourning. His large collection of historical documents about the city was given to the library by his great-grandson and his paintings went to the Norwich Castle Museum

In 1856 he married Caroline Cozens-Hardy, the eldest daughter of William Hardy and Sarah Cozens of Letheringsett Hall, who changed their surnames by royal licence in 1842 to Cozens-Hardy. They had six children: Laura (who married the academic and MP James Stuart), Russell, Ethel (who was the first woman to be Lord Mayor of Norwich), Helen, Alan and Florence (who married the architect Edward Boardman, son of the architect Edward Boardman). After her elder son Russell James Colman recovered from a serious childhood illness in 1863, Caroline became closely associated with the work of the Jenny Lind Hospital for Children. She gave her husband much support in his civic and parliamentary duties. She was the central figure behind all the welfare work for the employees of the company. A school was opened in King Street when the company moved to Carrow and in 1864 a new magnificent building was opened on Carrow Hill. The Carrow Works Dispensary was established in 1864 with a doctor and the first industrial nurse in the country. The company owned hundreds of properties around the city. Houses were provided for the workers at Carrow Close in Corton Road and Nightingale Cottages. In 1878, the County Ground, Lakenham was bought to become not only the focus of Carrow sport, but also home to Norfolk County Cricket Club. After Caroline died in 1895 Jeremiah James Colman gave a new site for the hospital on the outskirts of the city in her memory. In 1899, the Carrow Works Pension Fund was introduced as a memorial to J.J. Colman.

When he was asked how he had made a fortune out of such a humble product, he replied "I make my money from the mustard that people throw away on the sides of their plate".

Parliament of the United Kingdom
Preceded by Sir William Russell; Jacob Henry Tillett	Member of Parliament for Norwich; 1871–1895; With: Sir William Russell 1871–1874; John Walter Huddleston 1874–1875; Jacob Henry Tillett 1875–1885; Harry Bullard 1885–1886; Sir Samuel Hoare 1886–1895	Succeeded by Sir Samuel Hoare; Harry Bullard
