= Edward Godsalve =

English Roman Catholic Divine

- Occupation: Roman Catholic divine

Edward Godsalve was an English Roman Catholic divine.

== Biography ==
Godsalve was nominated by Henry VIII one of the original fellows of Trinity College, Cambridge, 19 December 1546 (Rymer, Fœdera, xv. 107). He was a great friend of John Christopherson, bishop of Chichester, and in Mary I's reign he was appointed to a stall in that cathedral. On 28 April 1554 he was admitted to the rectory of Fulbourn St. Vigors, Cambridgeshire, and in the same year he proceeded B.D.

He signed the Roman catholic articles 26 July 1555, and during the visitation of the university by Cardinal Pole's delegates in February 1556–57 he, Dr. Sedgwick, Thomas Parker, and Richard Rudde were deputed to peruse books, and to determine which were heretical. He refused to comply with the changes in religion made after the accession of Elizabeth. In February 1559–1560 Bishop William Barlow wrote to one of the queen's ministers, probably Cecil, announcing his intention to deprive Godsalve of his prebend (Cal. State Papers, Dom. 1547–80, p. 150). Soon after this Godsalve was deprived of all his preferments and obliged to retire to Antwerp. There he was elected professor of divinity in the monastery of St. Michael. He was living in 1568, but when he died is unknown.

His works are:

- "Historiæ Ecclesiasticæ pars prima, qua continetur Eusebii Pamphili lib. 10, &c.," Louvain, 1569, 8vo. This Latin translation by John Christopherson, bishop of Exeter, was edited by Godsalve, who translated Pars tertia, "Hist. Eccles. Scriptores Græci," &c., Cologne, 1570, fol., with Godsalve's original dedication and two of his letters prefixed. Other editions appeared at Cologne in 1581 and 1612.
- "Elucidationes quorundam textuum Sacræ Scripturæ," manuscript.
