= 1904 Norwich by-election =

1904 by-election

| ← 1900 | 15 January 1904 | 1906 → |

| Candidate | Tillett | Wild | Roberts |
| Party | Liberal | Unionist | ILP |
| Popular vote | 8,576 | 6,756 | 2,440 |
| Percentage | 48.3% | 38.0% | 13.7% |
MP before election
Sir Harry Bullard
Conservative
Subsequent MP
Louis Tillett
Liberal

The 1904 Norwich by-election was a Parliamentary by-election held on 15 January 1904. The constituency returned two Members of Parliament (MP) to the House of Commons of the United Kingdom, elected by the first past the post voting system.

== Vacancy ==
Bullard

Sir Harry Bullard had been Conservative MP for the seat of Norwich since the 1895 general election. He died on 26 December 1903 at the age of 62.

== Electoral history ==
The seat had been Conservative since they gained it in 1895. They held the seats at the last election, unopposed.

== Candidates ==
The local Conservative Association selected 35-year-old Ernest Wild as their candidate to defend the seat. He was born in Norwich and attended Norwich School. He was a Barrister who had been called to Bar at Middle Temple in 1893. He had been Judge of the Norwich Guildhall Court of Record since 1897.

The local Liberal Association selected 39-year-old Norfolk born, Norwich solicitor Louis Tillett as their candidate to gain the seat.

The local Independent Labour Party selected 36-year-old Norfolk born George Roberts as their candidate. He had joined the Independent Labour Party in 1886. He was elected to the Norwich School Board in 1889. He was Secretary of the Typographical Association and President of Norwich Trades Council.

== Campaign ==
election card

Polling Day was fixed for the 15 January 1904, just 20 days after the previous MP died.

== Result ==
The Liberals gained the seat from the Conservatives;

1904 Norwich by-election
| Party | Candidate | Votes | % | ±% |
|---|---|---|---|---|
| Liberal | Louis Tillett | 8,576 | 48.3 | New |
| Conservative | Ernest Wild | 6,756 | 38.0 | N/A |
| Ind. Labour Party | George Roberts | 2,440 | 13.7 | New |
| Majority | | 1,820 | 10.3 | N/A |
| Turnout | | 1,820 | 90.1 | N/A |
| Liberal gain from Conservative | | Swing | | |

The Spectator magazine, known for its Conservative sympathies felt that "There can be little doubt that the election was fought mainly on the fiscal issue, and the result is all the more encouraging to the opponents of Protectionism in that—to quote from the Times—" both the Liberal and the Labour candidates were free traders, their united votes showing a majority of more than four thousand against the advocate of fiscal reform."

== Aftermath ==
At the following General Election the Conservatives also lost the other seat, the result was;

General election January 1906
| Party | Candidate | Votes | % | ±% |
|---|---|---|---|---|
| Labour Repr. Cmte. | ✓ George Roberts | 11,059 | 37.5 | N/A |
| Liberal | ✓ Louis Tillett | 10,972 | 37.2 | N/A |
| Conservative | Ernest Wild | 7,460 | 25.3 | N/A |
| Labour Repr. Cmte. gain from Conservative | | | | |
| Majority | | 3,599 | 12.2 | N/A |
| Liberal hold | | | | |
| Majority | | 3,512 | 11.9 | N/A |
| Turnout | | 29,491 | 91.6 | N/A |
