= 1915 Norwich by-election =

UK Parliamentary by-election

Hilton Young

The 1915 Norwich by-election was held on 6 February 1915. The by-election was held due to the incumbent Liberal MP, Sir Frederick Low, being appointed as a Judge of the King's Bench division of the High Court. It was won by the Liberal candidate Hilton Young, who was elected unopposed.
