= George Roberts (British politician) =

British politician

The Right Honourable George Henry Roberts
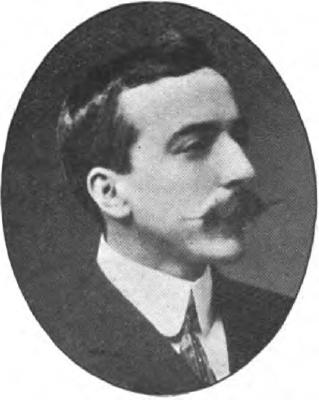
- Roberts in the mid 1900s

Minister of Food Control
- In office 10 January 1919 – 19 March 1920
- Prime Minister: David Lloyd George
- Preceded by: John Robert Clynes
- Succeeded by: Charles McCurdy

Minister for Labour
- In office 17 August 1917 – 10 January 1919
- Prime Minister: David Lloyd George
- Preceded by: John Hodge
- Succeeded by: Robert Horne

Parliamentary Secretary to the Board of Trade
- In office 14 December 1916 – 17 August 1917
- Prime Minister: David Lloyd George
- Preceded by: E. G. Pretyman
- Succeeded by: George Wardle

Chief Whip of the Labour Party
- In office 1916–1919
- Leader: Arthur Henderson; William Adamson
- Preceded by: Frank Goldstone
- Succeeded by: William Tyson Wilson
- In office 1907–1914
- Leader: Keir Hardie; Arthur Henderson; George Barnes; Ramsay MacDonald
- Preceded by: Arthur Henderson
- Succeeded by: Arthur Henderson

Member of Parliament for Norwich
- In office 8 February 1906 – 6 December 1923
- Preceded by: Sir Samuel Hoare
- Succeeded by: Dorothy Jewson

Personal details
- Born: 27 July 1868
- Died: 25 April 1928 (aged 59)
- Other political affiliations: Labour (until 1918); Coalition Labour (1918–22); Independent (1922–23); Conservative (from 1923)

George Henry Roberts (27 July 1868 – 25 April 1928) was a Labour Party politician who switched parties twice.

== Biography ==
Roberts was born on 27 July 1868 in Chedgrave, Norfolk. He was educated at St Stephen's School, Norwich, and thereafter became a printer and compositor. He was a member of the Norwich School Board from 1898 to 1903, and was a justice of the peace in the city.

At the 1906 general election, he was elected as Member of Parliament (MP) for Norwich. He was a minister in the Lloyd George Coalition Government as Parliamentary Secretary to the Board of Trade from 1916 to 1917, Minister of Labour from 1917 to 1919, and Minister of Food Control from 1919 to 1920. He was appointed as a Privy Counsellor in 1917.

Roberts stood in 1918 as a Coalition Labour candidate, opposed by the official Labour Party candidate. After leaving office in 1920, Roberts returned as a director to the firm he had left as works manager upon entering Parliament in 1906. He sat on the back-benches and as an independent retained his seat in the 1922 election but lost it as the Conservative candidate in 1923. Roberts spent the rest of his life in the sugar beet industry.

He died on 25 April 1928.

Parliament of the United Kingdom
Preceded by Samuel Hoare; Louis Tillett	Member of Parliament for Norwich; 1906–1923; With: Louis Tillett, to Jan 1910; Frederick Low, 1910–1915; Hilton Young, from 1915	Succeeded by Dorothy Jewson; Walter Smith
Trade union offices
Preceded by William Brace and Ben Turner	Trades Union Congress representative to the American Federation of Labour; 1911; With: James Crinion	Succeeded by James Seddon and Robert Smillie
Party political offices
Preceded by Ben Turner	Chair of the Labour Party; 1912–1913	Succeeded by Tom Fox
Political offices
Preceded by John Hodge	Minister for Labour; 1917–1919	Succeeded by Robert Horne
Preceded by J. R. Clynes	Minister of Food Control; 1919–1920	Succeeded by Charles McCurdy
