= Rugge =

Rugge may refer to:

- Rügge, a municipality in Schleswig-Holstein, Germany
- Rugge, a locality in the east of Avelgem, Belgium
- Rugge-Price baronets, a title in the Baronetage of the United Kingdom created in 1804

== People with the surname ==
- Fabio Rugge (born 1951), Italian academic, rector and public health manager
- Francis Rugge (1535–1607), English politician and Member of Parliament
- Jesse Rugge (born 1979), one of the former members of Jesse James Hollywood's gang who helped in the murder of Nicholas Markowitz
- John Rugge (died 1581), English Anglican priest
- Robert Rugge (1503–1559), English politician and Member of Parliament
- Thomas Rugge (died 1670s), English diarist
- William Rugge (bishop) (died 1550), English Benedictine theologian and bishop
