= List of mayors of Norwich =

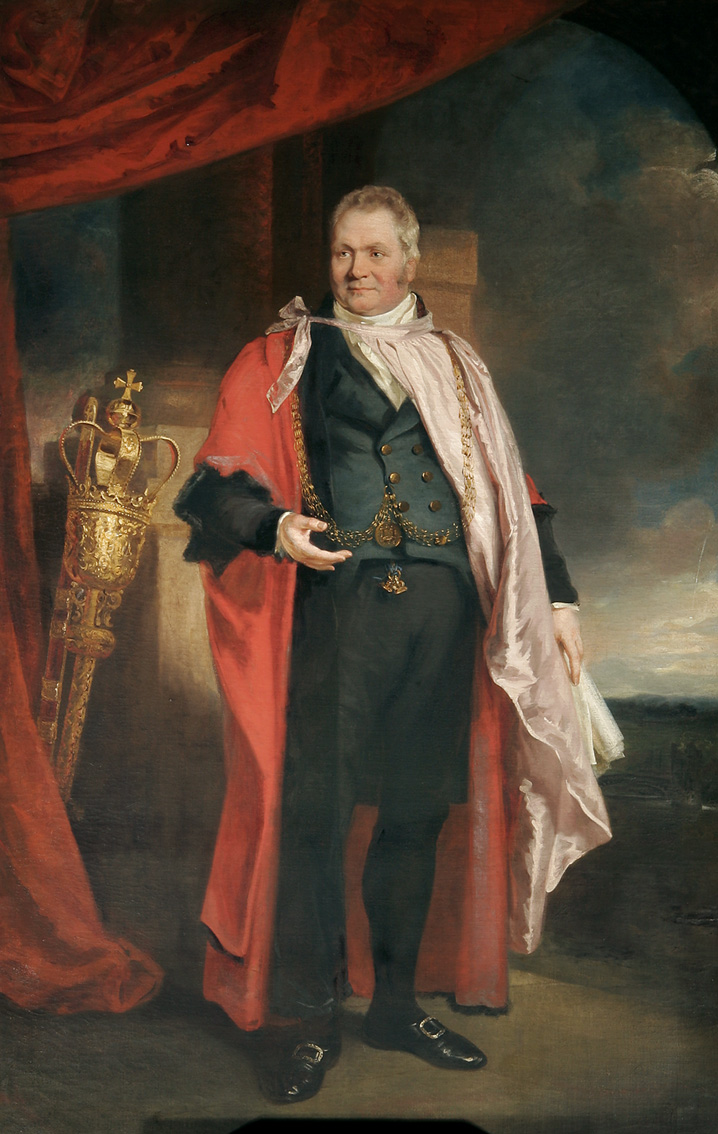
Joseph Clover – Portrait of Crisp Brown, Mayor of Norwich 1817, Norfolk Museums Collections

This is a list of mayors and the later lord mayors of the city of Norwich.

Norwich had elected a mayor since 1403 when a Charter of Henry IV allowed the Freemen of the city to elect Councillors, Aldermen, Sheriffs and a Mayor serving for one year. The city was awarded the dignity of a lord mayoralty by letters patent in 1910 "in view of the position occupied by that city as the chief city of East Anglia and of its close association with his Majesty". When Norwich became a metropolitan borough in 1974 the honour was reconfirmed by letters patent dated 1 April 1974.

== Mayors of Norwich ==
List of mayorsl
Year	Portrait	Name	Notes
1403–04		William Appleyard	First Mayor of Norwich. MP for Norwich, 1383, 1384, 1385, 1388, 1390, 1395, 1397, 1402, 1416 and 1419
1408–09		Edmund Warner	Merchant. MP for Norwich, 1401
1414–15		John Bixley	Merchant. MP for Norwich, 1413, 1415, 1416, 1419
1421–22		William Sedman	MP for Norwich, 1413, 1414, 1416
1424–25		Robert Baxter	Mercer. MP for Norwich, 1420, 1421
1429–30		Robert Baxter	Mercer. MP for Norwich, 1420, 1421
1435, 1440, 1452 and 1458		Robert Toppes	MP for Norwich
1481 and 1492		Robert Aylmer	Grocer, Sheriff of Norwich in 1471, Alderman of Norwich in 1480
1511		Richard Aylmer	Grocer, Sheriff of Norwich in 1501
1515–16		John Clerke	Mercer. MP for Norwich, 1512
1520–21		John Clerke	Mercer. MP for Norwich, 1512
1521–22		Edward Rede	MP for Norwich, 1529
1531–32		Edward Rede	MP for Norwich, 1529
1532–33		Reginald Lytilprowe	MP for Norwich, 1529
1534–35	Augustine Steward (painting from c. 1560s in St Andrews Hall, Norwich)	Augustine Steward	MP for Norwich, 1539, 1547
1539–40		Nicholas Sotherton	Alderman and grocer of Norwich
1542–43		William Rogers	MP for Norwich, 1542
1543–44		Edward Rede	MP for Norwich, 1529
1545–46		Robert Rugge	MP for Norwich, 1545
1546–47	Augustine Steward (painting from c. 1560s in St Andrews Hall, Norwich)	Augustine Steward	MP for Norwich, 1539, 1547
1547-48		Robert Leech	
1548-49		Edmond Wood	Died in office
1548-49		William Rogers	
1549-50		Thomas Codde	
1550–51		Robert Rugge	MP for Norwich, 1545
1551-52		Richard Davy	
1552-53		Thomas Cook	
1553-54		Henry Crooke	
1554–55		Thomas Marsham	MP for Norwich, 1553
1555-56		Felix Puttock	died in office
1555-56		Thomas Codde	
1556–57	Augustine Steward (painting from c. 1560s in St Andrews Hall, Norwich)	Augustine Steward	MP for Norwich, 1539, 1547
1557-58		Henry Bacon	
1558–59		John Aldrich	MP for Norwich, 1555, 1572
1559-60		Richard Fletcher	
1560–61		Robert Michell	MP for Norwich, 1563
1561-62		William Mingay	
1562-63		William Ferrour	
1563-64		Richard Davy	
1564-65		Nicholas Norgate	
1565–66		Thomas Sotherton	MP for Norwich, 1558, 1559
1566-67		Henry Bacon	
1567-68		Thomas Whall	
1568–69		Thomas Parker	MP for Norwich, 1563
1569-70		Robert Wood	
1570–71		John Aldrich	MP for Norwich, 1555, 1572
1571-72		Thomas Greene	
1572–73		Robert Suckling	Mercer. MP for Norwich, 1586
1573-74		Christopher Soam	
1574-75		Thomas Peck	
1575-76		William Ferrour	
1576–77		Thomas Layer	Grocer. MP for Norwich, 1586
1577-78		Thomas Culley	
1578-79		Sir Robert Wood	
1579–80		Simon Bowde	MP for Norwich, 1584
1580-81		Christopher Soam	
1581–82		Christopher Layer	Grocer. MP for Norwich, 1584 and 1597
1582–83		Robert Suckling	Mercer. MP for Norwich, 1586
1583–84		Thomas Gleane	Draper or mercer. MP for Norwich, 1589
1584-85		John Suckling	
1585-86		Thomas Layer	
1586-87		Thomas Peck	
1587–88		Francis Rugge	Mercer. MP for Norwich, 1589
1588-89		Simon Bowde	
1589–90		Christopher Layer	Grocer. MP for Norwich, 1584 and 1597
1590-91		Thomas Pettus	
1591–92		Robert Yarham	MP for Norwich, 1593
1592–93		Thomas Gleane	Draper or mercer. MP for Norwich, 1589
1593-94		Clement Hyrne	
1594-95		Christopher Soam	
1595-96		Thomas Layer	
1596-97		Richard Ferrour	
1597-98		Thomas Pye	
1598-99		Francis Rugge	
1599-1600		Roger Weld	
1600–01		Alexander Thurston	MP for Norwich, 1601
1601-02		John Tesmond	
1602		Thomas Gleane (disputed)	Gleane was elected in 1602, but the election was disputed. (Note: The city assembly had decided in 1598 that no one was to be mayor more than twice, and that nine years had to elapse between the two periods of office. Gleane had already been twice mayor of Norwich, in 1583–84 and 1592–93. The validity of the election was referred to the Lord Chief Justice and the learned counsel of the city, but Gleane died later that year.)
1602-03		Francis Rugge	
1603-04		Thomas Lane	
1604–05		Thomas Hyrne	Grocer. MP for Norwich, 1614, 1624, 1625, 1626
1605–06		Thomas Sotherton	MP for Norwich, 1597
1606-07		Joshua Culley	
1607-08		George Downing	
1608–09	Portrait of Sir John Pettus, Knt (4671776)	John Pettus	MP for Norwich, 1601, 1604
1609–10		Thomas Hyrne	Grocer. MP for Norwich, 1614, 1624, 1625, 1626
1610–11		Roger Ramsey	
1611–12		Thomas Anguish	
1612–13		Thomas Blosse	
1613–14		George Cocke	
1614–15		Thomas Pettus	
1615–16		Peter Gleane	MP for Norwich, 1628
1616–17		Sir Thomas Hyrne	Grocer. MP for Norwich, 1614, 1624, 1625, 1626
1618–19		Richard Rosse	MP for Norwich, 1621
1621–22		George Birch	Grocer and Apothecary
1624–25		Robert Debney	MP for Norwich, 1628
1652–53		William Barnham	Hosier. MP for Norwich, 1659, 1660
1657–58		Christopher Jay	MP for Norwich, 1661
1660		Sir Joseph Payne	Monument in St Gregory Pottergate, Norwich
1670–71	Augustine Briggs 1678–1683	Augustine Briggs	MP for Norwich, 1678
1681–82		Hugh Bokenham	MP for Norwich, 1690
1685–86		Francis Gardiner	MP for Norwich, 1695
1691–92		Thomas Blofield	MP for Norwich, 1689
1694–95		John Ward	MP for Norwich, 1694
1700–01		Edward Clarke	MP for Norwich, 1701
		John Hall	
		John Atkinson	
		John Freeman	
1704		William Blyth	
		Peter Thacker	
		William Cooke	
		Peter Seaman	
		Thomas Havers	
		Matthew Nall	
1710–11		Robert Bene	MP for Norwich, 1710
		William Cockman	
		John Goose	
		Nicholas Helwys	
1714–15		John Norman	Local farmer, landowner and brewer
1727		John Harvey	
1734	Godfrey Kneller (1646-1723) - Sir Philip Meadows (1626–1718) - R.1966-61 - Colchester and Ipswich Museums Service	Philip Meadows	Worsted manufacturer
1735		Thomas Vere	MP for Norwich, 1735
1737		John Spurrell	Sheriff 1728, mayor 1737, alderman of South Conisford Ward for nearly 40 years
1755	Peter Colombine (1755) by Charles Stoppelaer PCF1192	Pierre de Colombine	Worsted manufacturer, Sheriff of Norwich 1751
1759		Nockold Tompson	Brewer
1774		James Crowe	surgeon
1781		John Morse	Brewer, Sheriff of Norwich 1779
1788		John Patteson	MP for Norwich, 1806
1797		James Crowe	Surgeon
1803		John Morse	Brewer, Sheriff of Norwich 1779
1819-20		Nathaniel Bolingbroke	Founder of Bolingbroke & Co
1823		John Staniforth Patteson	Brewer
1824		Thomas Thurtell	Father of John Thurtell
1828–29		Thomas Thurtell	
1833–34		Sir Samuel Bignold	MP for Norwich, 1854
1838-39		John Marshall	Dry salter, oil and gum dealer. Sheriff of Norwich 1834-35
1846–47	Jeremiah Colman (1771-1851) who began the milling of mustard at Magdalen Gate, Norwich, in 1804. J. &J. Colman is named after Jeremiah and his nephew James.	Jeremiah Colman	Miller. Founder of Colman's Mustard
1848–49		Sir Samuel Bignold	MP for Norwich, 1854
1849–50		Henry Woodcock	Dental Surgeon, Sheriff of Norwich 1838-39
1850–51		Henry Woodcock	Dental Surgeon, Sheriff of Norwich 1838-39
1853–54		Sir Samuel Bignold	MP for Norwich, 1854
1859–60		Jacob Henry Tillett	Solicitor. MP for Norwich, 1880
1860–61		W. J. Utten Browne	
1861–62		John Oddin Taylor	
1862–63		Henry Stanley Patteson	
1863–64		Osborn Springfield	
1864–65		Charles Edward Tuck	
1865-66		W.P. Nichols	Prominent Norwich surgeon. Liberal
1866–67		Frederick Elwin Watson	
1867–68	Sir Jeremiah James Colman 1830-1898, a great-nephew of the founder. Under his leadership the expansion of the firm took place from a single mill to a works employing over 3,000 people.	Jeremiah James Colman	MP for Norwich, 1871
1868–69		Edward Kerrison Harvey	
1869–1870		Augustus Frederick Coke Bollingbroke	
1870–71		Frederick Elwin Watson	
1872–73		Sir Samuel Bignold	MP for Norwich, 1854
1873–74		Samuel Gurney Buxton	of The Hall, Catton, Norfolk
1875–76		Jacob Henry Tillett	Solicitor. MP for Norwich, 1880
1876–77		Richard Coller	
1877–78		Joseph De Carle Smith	
1878–80		Harry Bullard	Brewer
1883-84		Sir Peter Eade	
1885-86		John Gurney	
1886–87		Harry Bullard	Brewer
1891–92	1911 George Chamberlin	George Moore Chamberlin	Store owner. High Sheriff of Norfolk, 1926
1893-94		Sir Peter Eade	
1894–95	William Blake Richmond (1842-1921) - Lieutenant Colonel Charles Edward Bignold - NWHCM , 1951.9 , F - Norfolk Museums Collections	Charles Edward Bignold	
1895 (May-Nov)		Sir Peter Eade	
1895–96		John Moore	
1896–97		Sir Charles Rackham Gilman	Knighted 1897
1897–98		Clement Charles Rix Spelman	
1898–99		George Henry Morse	
1899–1900		James William Clabburn	
1900–01		Joseph John Dawson-Paul	
1901–02		Russell James Colman	
1902–03		Lieutenant Colonel John Robert Harvey	
1903–04		Geoffrey Fowell Buxton	
1904–05		Henry Zachariah Thompson Flowers	
1905–06		Edward Thomas Boardman	Architect
1906–07		William Robert Crow Howlett	
1907–08		Edmund Gurney Buxton	High Sheriff of Norfolk, 1922
1908–09		Walter Rye	

== Lord mayors of Norwich ==
Year	Portrait	Name	Notes
1909–10	Ernest Egbert Blyth (1857–1934), Last Mayor & First Lord Mayor of Norwich (1910), by William Orpen	Ernest Egbert Blyth	
1910–11		Sir Eustace Gurney	of Sprowston Hall
1911–12		Henry John Copeman	
1912–13		Arthur Michael Samuel	created Baron Mancroft 1937
1913–14		James Arthur Porter	
1914–15		Dr John Gordon Gordon-Munn	Psychiatrist at Heigham Hall
1915–16		Edwin Batterbee Southwell	
1916–17	1911 George Chamberlin	George Moore Chamberlin	Store owner. High Sheriff of Norfolk, 1926
1917–18		Richard Jewson	
1918–19	1911 George Chamberlin	Sir George Moore Chamberlin	Store owner. High Sheriff of Norfolk, 1926
1919–20		George Green	
1920–21		Lieutenant Colonel Granville John B Duff	
1921–22		Sir Henry Nicholas Holmes	
1922–23		Sir George Henry Morse	Brewer
1923–24	Ethel M. Colman LCCN2014716692	Ethel Mary Colman	
1924–25		George Stevens Pope	Psychiatrist at Heigham Hall
1925–26		Thomas Glover	
1926–27		Sir Charles Robert Bignold	
1927–28		Herbert Witard	
1928–28		Herbert P Gowen	
1929–30		Harry Harper-Smith	
1930–31		Mabel Maria Clarkson	
1931–32		Sir George Ernest White	
1932–33		Sir Henry Nicholas Holmes	
1933–34		Frederick C Jex	
1934–35		Percy William Jewson	Businessman and MP for Great Yarmouth (1941–45)
1935–36		Walter Alfred Riley	
1936–37		Herbert Frazer	
1937–38		Charles Frederick Watling	
1938–39		Percy Edward Curl	
1939–40		James Frederick (Fred) Henderson	Socialist writer
1940–41		Bernard James Hanly	
1941–42		James Henry Barnes	
1942–43		Arthur J Cleveland	
1943–44		William James Finch	
1944–45		Edward Frank Williamson	
1945–46		Sidney Albert Bailey	
1946–47		William Oliver Copeman	
Nov 1947 – May 1949		Walter Gibbard Cutbush	
May 1949–50		Alfred Ernest Baines	
1950–51		Ruth Elsie Hardy	
1951–52		Eric John Sidney Hinde	
1952–53		William Ernest Walker	
1953–54	Ralph Hale Mottram in 1925	Ralph Hale Mottram	
1954–55		Horace Allen	
1955–56		Ian Dunbar Dickson	
1956–57		Sir Arthur South	
1957–58		Thomas Christopher Eaton	
1958–59		Norman Reeve Tillett	
1959–60		Michael Waldo Boone Bulman	
1960–61		Alfred E Nichols	
1961–62		Richard Quinton Gurney	
1962–63		Andrew Ryrie	
1963–64		Leonard Arthur Howes	
1964–65		Sydney W W Clapham	
1965–66		Charles Boardman Jewson	
1966–67		Harry Perry	
1967–68		Cecil Harry Sutton	
1968–69		Edward Albert Gambling	
1969–70		Jessie Ruby Griffiths	
1970–71		Herbert John Jarrold	
1971–72		Donald M Pratt	
1972–73		Richard B. Seabrook	
1973–74		Robert J Symonds	
1974–75		William A J Spear	
1975–76		Joyce L Morgan	
1976–77		Raymond C Frostick	
1977–78		Ralph W Roe	
1978–79		Dr J Peter English	
1979–80		Valerie Guttsman	
1980–89		Eric Hartley	
1981–82		Alan R Driver	
1982–83		L George Richards	
1983–84		Leonard A Stevenson	
1984–85		Stanley B Petersen	
1985–86		Barbara E E Stevenson	
1986–87		Jill B Miller	
1987–88		Garry S Wheatley	
1988–89		David Bradford	
1989–90		David Fullman	
1990–91		Bernard N Smith	
1991–92		Philip Moore	
1992–92		Arthur V Clare	
1993–94		Roy Durrant	
1994–95		Brenda Ferris-Rampley	
1995–96		Lila D Cooper	
1996–97		Rory E N Quinn	
1997–98		Harry W Watson	
1998–99		Derek F J Wood	
1999–2000		Douglas C Underwood	
2000–01		Ron Borrett	
2001–02		Keith Ratcliffe	
2002–03		Derek F J Wood	
2003–04		Chris Southgate	
2004–05		Joyce Climie Divers	
2005–06		Michael John Banham	
2006–07		Felicity E Hartley	
2007–08		Roy George Blower	
2008–09		Jeremy Nigel Hooke	
2009–10		Evelyn J Collishaw	
2010–11		Tom Dylan	
2011–12		Jennifer Susan Lay	
2012–13		Ralph Gayton	
2013–14		Keith Driver	
2014–15		Judith Lubbock	
2015–16		Brenda Arthur	
2016–17		Marion Maxwell	
2017–18		David Fullman	Second term (see 1989)
2018–19		Martin Schmierer	
2019–21		Vaughan Thomas	Terms extended to two years due to deferred elections (COVID-19)
2021–23		Dr Kevin Maguire	Terms extended to two years due to deferred elections (COVID-19)
2023–24		James Wright	
2024–25		Vivien Thomas	
2025–26		Paul Kendrick	
