= Thomas Rugge =

English diarist

Thomas Rugge (died c. 1670 or c. 1672) was a diarist and later compiler of 'Mercurius Politicus Redivivus'. The "Diurnall" of Thomas Rugge, which is preserved in the British Museum, corroborates Pepys in many ways.

== Self-description for his diary ==
MERCURIUS POLITICUS REDIVIVUS

or, A Collection of the most materiall occurrances and transactions

in Public Affairs since Anno Dni, 1659, untill

28 March 1672,

serving as an annuall diurnall for future satisfaction and

information,

BY THOMAS RUGGE.

Est natura hominum novitatis avida.—Plinius.

== Preservation of his diary ==
Thomas Rugge's Diurnall is preserved in the British Library, where it forms Add MSS 10116–10117. It belonged in 1693 to Thomas Grey, second earl of Stamford, and was purchased by the British Museum at Heber's sale in February 1836. It was published as The diurnal of Thomas Rugg, 1659-1661 by William Lewis Sachse ed. in 1961.

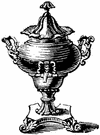
Tea Urn

== Descriptions of tea, coffee, and chocolate drinking habits in the 1650s ==
The journal is important, early source for the drinking habits of the English of hot drinks, including a strange, new trend that would later have great cultural impact.

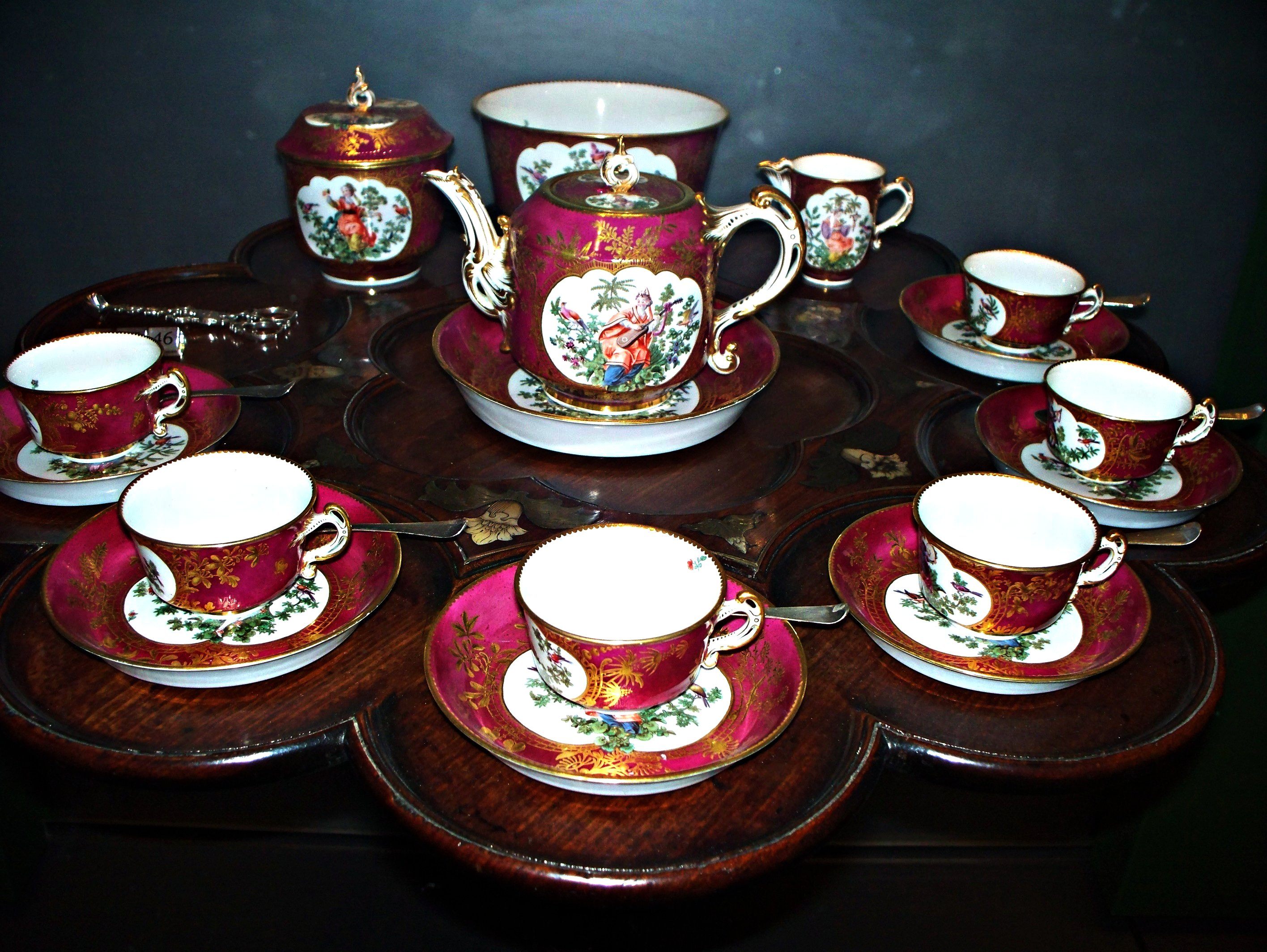
English Tea Set 18th century. Tea service, tea spoons and sugar nippers, set out on a tripod table

According to Thomas Rugge's Diurnall, in London 'Coffee, chocolate and a kind of drink called tee' were 'sold in almost every street in 1659'.

And theire ware also att this time a Turkish drink to bee sould, almost every street, called coffee, and another kind of drink called tee, and also a drink called Chacolate, which was a very harty drink.

== Life in Covent Garden ==
Thomas Rugge paid hearth tax for nine hearths when he lived in Covent Garden, Middlesex in 1666. He lived in King Street 1651–c.1663.

«Thomas Rugge was descended from an ancient Norfolk family, and two of his ancestors are described as Aldermen of Norwich. His death has been ascertained to have occurred about 1672; and in the Diary for the preceding year he complains that on account of his declining health, his entries will be but few. Nothing has been traced of his personal circumstances beyond the fact of his having lived for fourteen years in Covent Garden, then a fashionable locality.»

== Known kinsman ==
This was the same ancient Norfolk family of Rugge that William Rugge, Bishop of Norwich, belonged to.

The Rugge family had a presence in the region for many hundred years.

== Identification with Thomas Rugge of St. Paul ==
He may have been the Thomas Rugge of St. Paul, Covent Garden whose will was probated on 31 March 1670, though this seemingly predates the end of the journal entries.

That would make him the Thomas Rugge who was buried on 16 March 1669/70 at St. Paul's, Covent Garden.

== Possible children ==
At St. Paul's, Covent Garden, we find the following baptisms:

- Elizabeth, baptised 26 October 1653, daughter to Thomas and Elizabeth Rugg, born on 26 October, the first entry of The registers of St. Paul's church, Convent garden, London
- Ann, baptised 11 December 1654, daughter to Thomas and Elizabeth Rugg, born 11 December 1654, buried 9 May 1657 at St. Paul's, Covent Garden, Anna, daughter of Tho : Rugg
- Mary, baptised on 27 June 1659, daughter to Thomas and Eliza : Rugg, born on 26 June 1659, buried 12 October 1659 at St. Paul's, Covent Garden, Mary, daughter of Tho : Rugg
- John, baptised 16 April 1662, son of Thomas and Elizabeth Rugg, buried 17 October 1673 at St. Paul's, Covent Garden, John, son of Thomas Rugg

At the time of the Commonwealth of England date of birth had to be registered in the parish registers.

Half the entries in the journal, which spans more than a decade, are after the death of Mary in late 1659 and before the birth of John in early 1662.

== His widow and their nephew ==
ODNB identifies the preceding marriage as that between Thomas Rugg and Elizabeth Cox at St. Clement Danes, in the City of Westminster, London, both of Covent Garden. The will of the widow of Thomas Rugge, Elizabeth Rugge née Cox (d.1695) of Saint Giles in the Fields, Middlesex, England, does not mention any children, but does mention her nephew, John Rugge of Bugden in the County of Huntingdon. This was the John Rugge (d.1720) of the Inner Temple, London and Stirtloe, Buckden, Huntingdonshire, gentleman, who married Elizabeth, the daughter of Sir Robert Wright, Chief Justice of the King's Bench. Their grandson was the Reverend William Rugge, Rector of Buckland (16 May 1740 – 2 November 1786).

== Church monument ==
From his monument in Buckland Church, the coat of arms of the Reverend William Rugge, Rector of Buckland is described as:

Arms: Gules a chevron engrailed between three mullets pierced Argent.

Of the arms of William Rugge, Bishop of Norwich, it is said:

William Rugge, Esq. of Felmingham, is said to have changed his arms, per fess, sable and argent, and unicorn saliant, counterchanged, armed, mained and unguled or, to that of gules, a chevron engrailed, between three mullets pierced, argent; but Richard de Rugge, who lived in the 2d of Richard III. and the Bishop of Norwich, bore, as it appears, this last coat.

William Rugge, Rector of Buckland and William Rugge, Bishop of Norwich, were of the same family.

So also were the Reverend's Rugge relations, amongst them his great-granduncle Thomas Rugge, the diarist.

== The Coat of Arms ==
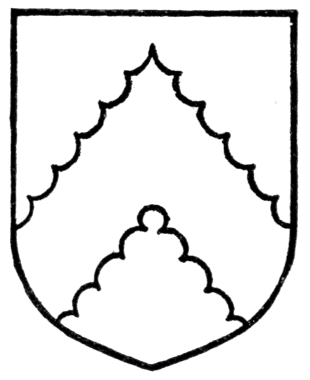
Chevron engrailed

Arms: Gules a chevron engrailed between three mullets pierced Argent

In heraldry:

Gules is the tincture with the colour red

Chevron engrailed

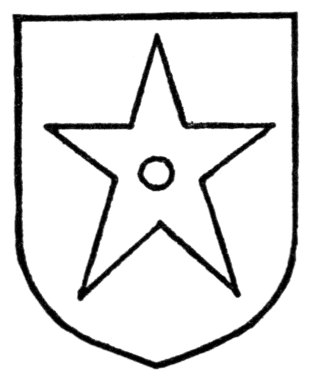
Mullet pierced

A star with straight-sided rays is usually called a mullet, and which may or may not be pierced

Argent is the tincture of silver, and belongs to the class of light tinctures called "metals". It is very frequently depicted as white and usually considered interchangeable with it. In engravings and line drawings, regions to be tinctured argent are either left blank, or indicated with the abbreviation ar

The Rugge coat of arms can be seen on the monument of Francis Rugge (1535–1607), Mayor of Norwich at St. Andrew's Church in Norwich, though the chevron does not appear to be engraileded. Francis Blomefield, Rector of Fersfield in Norfolk, writing some three hundred years prior to this, however, confirms this to be the coat of arms of Rugge in his An Essay Towards A Topographical History of the County of Norfolk: Volume 4, Containing the History of Norwich, Part II. The coat of arms of Rugge quarters, 1st, arg. a chevron ingrailed between six keys sab. 2d, arg. a chevron ingrailed sab. between three birds. 3d, Brome. There is a crescent for difference. The said quartered coats impale Aldrich, and there is a shield of Aldrich single.

Of the other coats of arms the Rugge coat of arms is quartered with, Argent, a chevron, between three birds (martlets), sable, appears to be the coat of arms of Elizabeth Wood, Francis Rugge's mother.

The Reverend Edmund Farrer in his The Church Heraldry of Norfolk : A Description of All Coats of Arms on Brasses, Monuments, Slabs, Hatchments, &c., Now to Be Found in the County writes that at Hoveton St. John can be found coloured shields on the screen, one of which is:

Gules, a chevron engrailed between three pierced mullets argent, Rugge

The Rugge family owned property in Hoveton from at least 1533, when William Rugge, abbot of St. Bennet's, conveyed the manor of Greengate to Robert Rugge, his brother, alderman of Norwich. Robert still owned the manor of Greengate in 1558, with that of Spicer's, alias Berds, in Hoveton St. John, and St. Peter, Tunsted, Below, and Ashmanagh, the last sold to him also by the late abbot, his brother. The family held property there until at least 1618.
