= Francis Rugge =

English politician

Francis Rugge (1535 – 18 October 1607), of Norwich, Norfolk, was an English politician.

Rugge was the fourth son of Robert Rugge (d. 1559), Mayor of Norwich, by Elizabeth, daughter of Robert Wood of Norwich. Robert's brother was William Rugge, Bishop of Norwich. Francis was born in 1535.

Rugge was a freeman of Norwich in 1563, an alderman in the same city from about 1570, sheriff of Norwich in 1572 to 1573, and Mayor of Norwich in 1587-1588, again in 1598-1599, and lastly in 1602-1603. He represented Norwich as a Member of Parliament (MP) in 1589.

Rugge married Anne, the daughter of John Aldrich. He also inherited his father’s position as a Norwich mercer. When his father died in 1559, the younger Rugge was left two manors as well as money and plate. He was named one of the executors of the elder Rugge's will.

Rugge died on 18 October 1607. A funeral monument for both Rugge and his wife survives, and is located in a chapel in St Andrew's Church in Norwich.
