= Nicholas Sotherton =

English politician

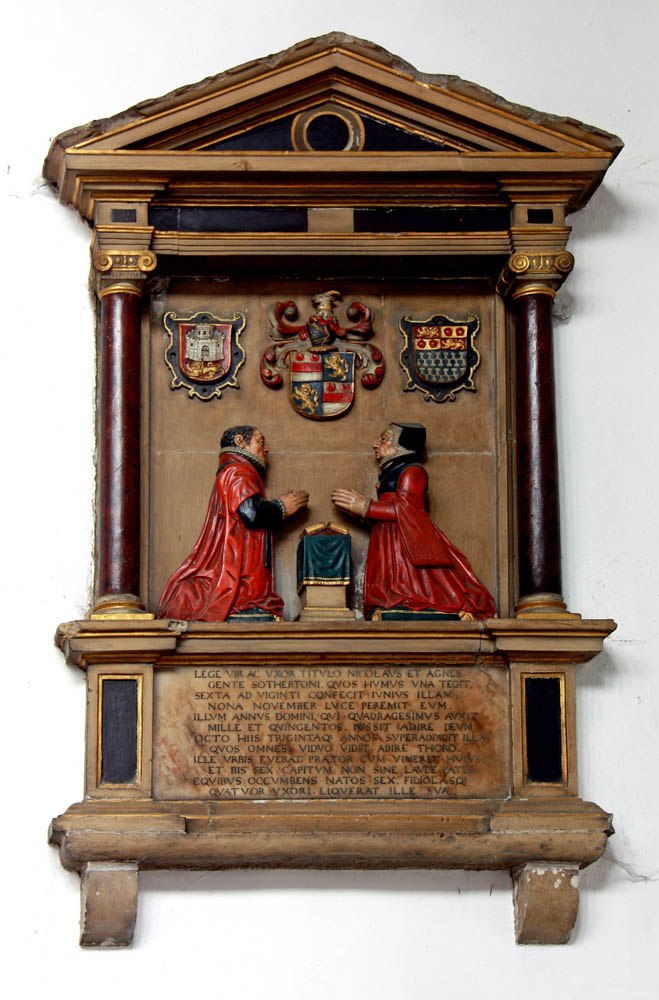
Mural monument to Nicholas Sotherton in the Church of St John Maddermarket, Norwich

Nicholas Sotherton (died 1540), of Norwich, Norfolk, was an English merchant and politician.

He was a grocer, alderman and Mayor of Norwich 1539–40.

In the chancel of St. John the Baptist's Church in Madder-Market, Norwich:

Here lieth buried the Body of master Nicholas Sutherton, latte Mayer and Alderman of this Worschipfull Cite, whiche the nerte yere after that he was Mayer, discessid out of this transeitorie Lyfe, that was the yere of our Lord 1540, the x Day of Nov. On whose Soule say yow, Jesu have Mercy, For as he is so schall ye be.

Sotherton, arg. a fess, in chief two crescents gul. impaling Hetherset, az. a lion rampant guardant or.

The monument is still extant. He and his wife Agnes (d.1576) had six sons and five daughters.

Children of Nicholas Sotherton and Agnes Wright:

- Thomas Sotherton, (by 1525 – 1583), Member of Parliament for Norwich in 1558 and 1559 and mayor of the city in 1565–66, m. Elizabeth, the daughter of Augustine Steward, mercer, alderman and Mayor of Norwich, and had four sons and four daughters
- George Sotherton, m. Elizabeth, at least one son, five daughters
- John Sotherton of Norwich, gentleman, m. Mary Steward, daughter of Augustine Steward, and had Mary Sotherton, John Sotherton, Thomas Sotherton and Anne Sotherton. His brother Thomas was married to Mary's sister Elizabeth Steward, a double marriage between the two families.
- Probably Nicholas Sotherton, Sheriff of Norwich in 1572, the author of the only known surviving eye-witness account of Kett's Rebellion, The Commoyson in Norfolk, 1549. He is described as being 'son of a Norwich mayor'.
- Elizabeth Sotherton, who married John Aldrich (by 1520 – 1582), Member of Parliament for Norwich in 1555 and 1572 and mayor of the city in 1570–71
