= Mabel Clarkson =

British politician

Clarkson in 1928

Mabel Maria Clarkson CBE JP (1 June 1875 – 21 March 1950), was a British Liberal, then Labour politician who was Lord Mayor of Norwich.

== Background ==
Clarkson was born the daughter of Richard Clarkson, Solicitor, and Elizabeth Ann Prince of Calne, Wilts. He died when she was three and thereafter was raised by her mother along with her brother and four sisters. She was educated at a private school and then at Reading University. She was awarded the CBE in the 1931 Birthday Honours.

== Political career ==
Clarkson was a member of the Liberal Party. Standing as a Liberal, she was elected as a Poor Law Guardian and served from 1905–30. She was elected as a Liberal candidate to Norwich Town Council in 1912, the first woman to be elected to the council. She is described as a quick, sharp and compassionate lady. In her election address in 1912 she said: "I do not hesitate to say that some of the dwellings in which some families are living today, are a disgrace to the City. Those of us who care for the purity of our homes, for the right of little children to opportunities for health and development, for prevention of infantile mortality, and of all the unnecessary sickness and suffering caused by overcrowding and bad housing, are bound to make every effort to get rid of slums." In 1922 she became a Justice of the peace. In 1923 she lost her seat on the town council. In 1924 she joined the Labour Party. In 1926 she won back a seat on the town council standing as a Labour candidate. She was Sheriff of Norwich from 1928–29. She served as Lord Mayor of Norwich from 1930-31. She continued as a councillor until 1932 when she was appointed as an Alderman.

Her approach changed over time; initially she pushed the Council to impose compulsory repair notices on properties that were in a very poor state of repair. Later she advocated that the Council should acquire and itself repair properties. Finally, she managed to persuade a Conservative majority Council to build new Council Housing. She continued to serve on the town council retiring in 1948.
