= George Birch (mayor) =

English politician

George Birch (died 1632) was an English politician.

He was Sheriff of Norwich in 1604, and became Mayor of Norwich in 1621. He was a grocer and apothecary, and was married.
