= Robert Wood (mayor) =

English politician

Sir Robert Wood of Norwich, Norfolk, was an English politician.

Wood was the son of Edmund Wood and Elizabeth Peyrs of Norwich.

Wood was Mayor of Norwich, and was knighted by Queen Elizabeth I in 1578.

Wood was knighted on Queen Elizabeth I's progress in Norfolk, in 1578.

Wood married Anne, daughter of Augustine Steward, Mayor of Norwich, and they had five children: Edmond, Robert, Elizabeth, Austin, and Peter.
