= Henry Woodcock =

Henry Woodcock, Esq. (1789–1879) was a 19th century public official in the city of Norwich, Norfolk, United Kingdom. He was elected Sheriff of Norwich for one term (1839), and Mayor of Norwich for two terms (1849, 1850) and served as commissioner and magistrate.

== Background ==
Born to Robert Woodcock and Elizabeth Guggle. Baptised 19 July 1789 in North Creake, Norfolk.

Woodcock Married Mary Ann Orton (1789-1866), widow of Anthony Bale (1755–1719), in 1821, in Litcham, Norfolk.

He established a dental surgery practice in Norwich, on St. Giles Street, which he operated for 40 years. The practice was taken over by his nephew and long term assistant John Suggett in the mid 1860s.

== Public life ==
Henry Woodcock was elected Sheriff of Norwich for one term, 1838–1839, under Mayor John Marshall, and Mayor for two successive terms, 1849–1850 and 1850–1851. Woodcock continued as alderman and magistrate through the 1870s; his 1851 census return shows his occupation was "Mayor and Surgeon dentist"; the 1861 census says "Magistrate for City and Dentist", and the 1871 census says he was a "Magistrate and Landowner".

== Death ==
Henry Woodcock died 30 January 1879, age 90. Buried at Hellesdon, Norfolk at St Mary's Churchyard. Predeceased by his wife Mary Ann in 1866.

== Legacy ==
While serving as Mayor, Woodcock gifted the clock and enclosing clock-turret at Norwich Guildhall in 1850. The clock and tower is a Grade I listed building feature in Norwich. His name is inscribed below the clock face.
