= John Spurrell =

Mayor of Norwich in 1737

John Spurrell (1681/1682–3 January 1763) was mayor of Norwich in 1737.

He served as alderman of South Consiford ward for nearly 40 years and was also sheriff of Norwich in 1728. His portrait by William Smith, dated 1758, hangs at St. Andrew's and Blackfriars' Hall in Norwich.

In 1716 Spurrell married Priscilla (d. 1742), daughter of Robert Chadd of Wells-next-the-Sea; they are buried at St John Sepulchre church in Norwich.
