= Pierre Colombine =

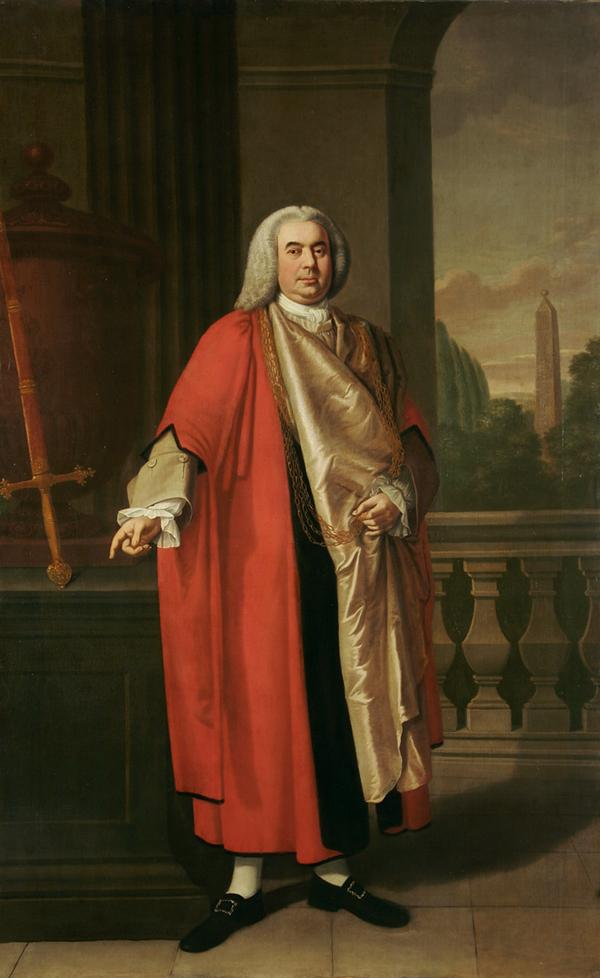
- Born: 1697
- Died: 1770 (aged 72–73)
- Occupation: Worsted manufacturer
- Known for: Mayor of Norwich (1755); Sheriff of Norwich (1751)
- Spouse: Marie Martineau
- Children: Paul Colombine

Pierre Colombine (also recorded as Pierre de Colombine and anglicized as Peter Colombine) (1697–1770) was a prominent 18th-century worsted manufacturer and civic leader who served as the Mayor of Norwich in 1755. A central figure in the city's booming textile industry, he was a first-generation descendant of the Huguenot refugees who established themselves in East Anglia.

== Early Life and Background ==
Colombine was born in 1697, the son of Francis (François) Colombine. His father was a French Protestant physician who fled religious persecution in the province of Dauphiné, France, following the 1685 Revocation of the Edict of Nantes. The family settled in Norwich, integrating into the established Walloon and French community known locally as "Les Étrangers" (The Strangers), who worshipped at the French Church of St Mary the Less.

== Commercial career ==
Capitalizing on the advanced weaving techniques introduced by the immigrant communities, Colombine built substantial wealth as a master worsted weaver. Worsted textiles were the bedrock of the Norwich economy during the 18th century, and Colombine successfully leveraged this to build a major local manufacturing firm, widely recorded in trade directories as "Peter Colombine and Son."

== Civic Service ==
Colombine's significant financial standing and influence as a master weaver facilitated his ascent into the city's civic elite. He was elected as Sheriff of Norwich in 1751. Following a successful tenure demonstrating his administrative capabilities, he was subsequently elected Mayor of Norwich four years later, presiding from the Norwich Guildhall in 1755.

== Personal Life and Legacy ==
Colombine married Marie Martineau (died 1780), effectively linking the Colombine lineage with the powerful Martineau dynasty of Norwich. This union connects his descendants to notable later historical figures, including the pioneering sociologist Harriet Martineau and the religious philosopher James Martineau.

His son, Paul Colombine, continued the family's commercial and civic prominence. The wider family is memorialized via an interior plaque at St Mary the Less in Norwich, where Marie Martineau is also recorded in the 1780 burial registers.
