= W. L. Guttsman =

German historian and librarian

Wilhelm Leo Guttsman (1920–1998), published as W. L. Guttsman and also known as Willi Guttsman, was a German historian and librarian. After arriving in England as a refugee in the late 1930s, he eventually became Chief Librarian of the University of East Anglia (1962–85) and established a reputation as a political scientist and historian of politics and art.

== Early life and education ==
Born on 23 August 1920 in Berlin (Weimar Germany's capital city), Wilhelm Leo Guttsmann was the son of an engineer father and a teacher mother. His family were bourgeois, German and Jewish; in 1933 (following the Nazi's rise to power), state-sanctioned antisemitism made the country increasingly hostile for the Guttsmanns. Wilhelm was forced to transfer to a Jewish school (which he eventually left aged 16 and with few prospects). In 1936, his father was fired from his job as the company he worked for removed non-"Aryan" employees from its roster. Following Kristallnacht, Guttsman was one of many young Jewish men rounded up and detained in concentration camps; he spent six weeks in Buchenwald. After his release, his parents sent him to England, where he arrived as a refugee. They stayed behind and were murdered during the Holocaust.

== England ==
=== Wartime ===
In England, he adopted Guttsman (with one "n") as his name and joined efforts with other German-Jewish refugees to plan their return to Germany and build a new social-democratic system of government there. But Guttsman was detained as an enemy alien shortly after the outbreak of the Second World War in 1939, before being deported to Australia later that year. He was eventually allowed to return to the United Kingdom. With limited financial means and qualifications, he worked on a cattle farm for a time and then as a market gardener, but in 1942 he enrolled on a part-time economics degree at Birkbeck College, London, where he opted for more courses on sociology, history and politics than he did economics. Graduating in 1945, he then completed a year-long MSc at the London School of Economics (LSE).

=== Librarian and scholar ===
In 1946, Gutsman was appointed a library assistant at the LSE and, with a nose for acquiring works on labour history, he was appointed Acquisitions Officer in 1952, succeeding another German, the economist Eduard Rosenbaum. He remained there until 1962, when he was offered the post of Chief Librarian at the new University of East Anglia (UEA) being built in Norwich. There, he oversaw the design and construction of the library building. He employed as his deputy the Polish-born French scholar and librarian Elizabeth Fudakowska, who had previously worked with him at the LSE. Guttsman also appointed a team of specialist librarians under them, whose jobs were to order books in their subject areas; a novelty, this freed up academics' time for research, but it was a regime which would not last when funding cuts set in during the late 1970s and 1980s. He nevertheless strengthened UEA's collection of books, especially in the area of modern German history; he also increasingly took an interest in art and art history, hosting exhibitions in the library. He retired in 1985.

Alongside his professional work as a librarian, Guttsman was also a keen researcher. He published a wide range of material, but among his best-known works was his 1963 book The British Political Elite. This used biographical data about Britain's frontbench politicians to analyse their social and educational backgrounds; it demonstrated similarity between the leadership of the Conservatives and Labour, key evidence for the notion that British politics had become based on consensus. His next major book returned to his earlier interest in German history; The German Social Democratic Party 1875–1933 (1981) was a political science study which analysed the party's organisation and politics within a historical perspective. He became interested especially in the cultural dimension of left-wing politics in interwar Germany and he published Workers' Culture in Weimar Germany in 1990. He followed this up with Art for Workers in 1997. By that time, he was ill with Parkinson's disease and he died on 13 February 1998. His wife Valerie, a social worker who served as Lord Mayor of Norwich in 1979–80, survived him, as did their daughter.

=== Legacy ===
When Guttsman died, the art historian Peter Lasko wrote in The Independent that he had "opened up a new aspect of art history. He combined his knowledge of German social democracy with his unrivalled knowledge of the visual arts (much of it ephemeral) that served left-wing political ends." The historian Richard J. Evans also wrote an obituary of him for German History, in which he remarked that Guttsman's final book was a "significant contribution to cultural history" while his dedication in building up UEA's library had produced his "lasting monument".

== Works ==
- Art for the Workers: Ideology and the Visual Arts in Weimar Germany, Manchester University Press, 1997
