= Jenny Lind Children's Hospital =

Children's hospital in Norwich, England

Geography
- Location: Norwich, Norfolk, United Kingdom

Organisation
- Care system: National Health Service
- Type: Children's
- Network: Norfolk and Norwich University Hospital

History
- Former names: Jenny Lind Infirmary for Sick Children (1854–1918); Jenny Lind Hospital for Sick Children (1918–75); Jenny Lind Children’s Department (1975)
- Opened: 3 April 1854

Links
- Website: nnuh.nhs.uk/our-services/our-hospitals/jennylind
- Lists: Hospitals in the United Kingdom

The Jenny Lind Children's Hospital, informally known as The Jenny, is a children's hospital located in Norwich, England as part of Norfolk and Norwich University Hospital.

The Jenny Lind was opened as the Jenny Lind Infirmary for Sick Children on 3 April 1854 using funding from an 1849 concert in the city by its namesake, Swedish opera singer Jenny Lind. It was the second children's hospital to be established in the country. The hospital was located in a large converted residential building in Pottergate until moving to Tombland from 1898, and then to a purpose-built site on Unthank Road from 1900. In 1918, it changed its name to the Jenny Lind Hospital for Sick Children. A full transfer of patients to the Unthank Road site occurred in 1929. The Jenny Lind later moved into Norfolk and Norwich Hospital in 1975 as the Jenny Lind Children’s Department.

== Background ==
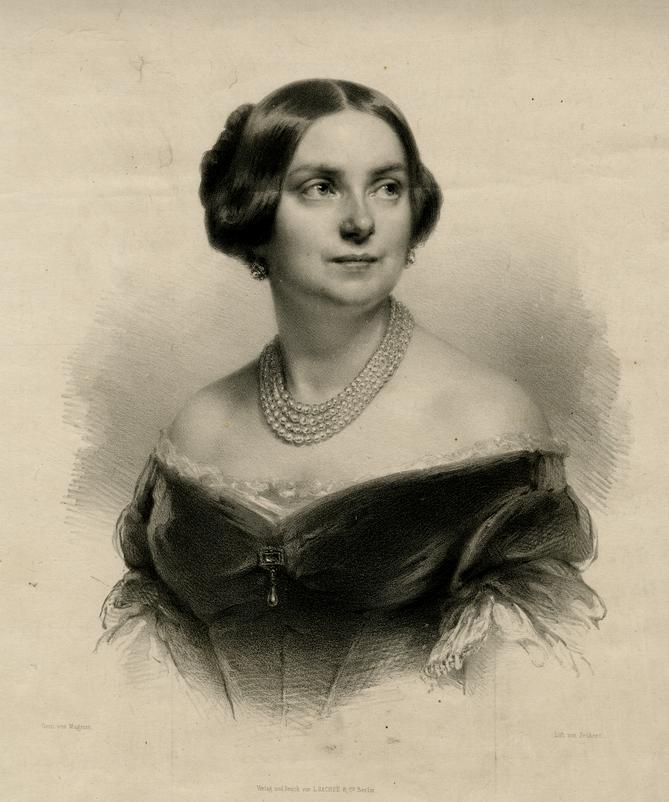
Jenny Lind in 1849

In 1847, Swedish operatic soprano Jenny Lind (1820–1887), one of the most celebrated performers of the 19th century, went on tour in England, visiting Norwich after being invited to perform by Bishop Stanley. During her time in the city, she developed a friendship with the bishop and his family. In 1849, two years after her previous performance in Norwich, Lind made a return to the city to perform a second time, this time released from binding artistic contracts and with the intention "to raise money for the poor in the city." Her performance in January in St Andrew's Hall, to a packed audience, raised £1,253, with the recipients of the money left to be determined by a public committee. This committee, at a public meeting on 30 May 1853, decided unanimously to use the money to build a children's hospital, and name it in Lind's honour.

== History ==
=== Founding and Pottergate residence ===
The hospital, named the Jenny Lind Infirmary for Sick Children, opened on 3 April 1854, the second children's hospital to be established in the country. Initially, it opened in a large converted residential property in Pottergate in the centre of Norwich, and was intended for "children between the ages of two and ten years, suffering from any disease not contagious or infectious ... as inpatients, and children from birth to the age of twelve years ... admissible as outpatients." In its first year, it had twelve beds, admitted 51 patients, with 275 seen as outpatients.

From 1854 until 1886, the Norwich Lying-In Charity, a form of midwifery-led birthing unit, which provided midwives for married women who were confined at home, shared premises with the Jenny Lind. During these first decades, few surgical operations were performed, and medical treatment was mainly used instead. Rest, wholesome diets and good hygiene being central aspects of this care. Most of the inpatients suffered from injuries or diseases that resulted from poverty and insanitary living conditions. In 1856, a vaccination clinic was started in the hospital.

By the 1860s, it was treating more than 500 children annually. It began to offer a wide variety of surgical procedures from 1865. Lind, her husband Otto, and their family continued to visit the hospital for many years; one of their entries in the visitor's book reads, "Grateful for the care the children enjoy."

The annual children treated by the hospital increased to 1150 by the 1880s, on an income of less than £1 per patient. Nearly a fifth of the children at this time were inpatients, and two thirds were pronounced cured or relieved. The Jenny Lind encouraged parents to attend the hospital to assist in caring for the children, and was known to have broken its own rules to allow babies to be with their mothers. It had an educational role that was new at the time, with a "constant drilling of parents as to the general management of their offspring." By the final quarter of the 19th century, its surgical treatments were increasing, as a result of the advent of anaesthesia and asepsis allowing for more complex and invasive procedures; in 1885, 29 children of total 194 inpatients underwent surgery. In 1894, scarlet fever spread in the hospital despite the non-admittance of children with infectious diseases.

Visitors to the hospital were encouraged throughout the nineteenth century, including the relatives and friends of patients as well as the supporters and potential supporters from whom the hospital received its funds. These supporters included the Ladies' Committee, to whom the matron reported directly and who made regular inspections of the wards and reported the findings to the Committee of Management. In the 1890s and 1900s, the supporters lost importance to the hospital, and visitors to patients were being virtually excluded by the 1920s.

=== Move to Tombland and Unthank Road ===
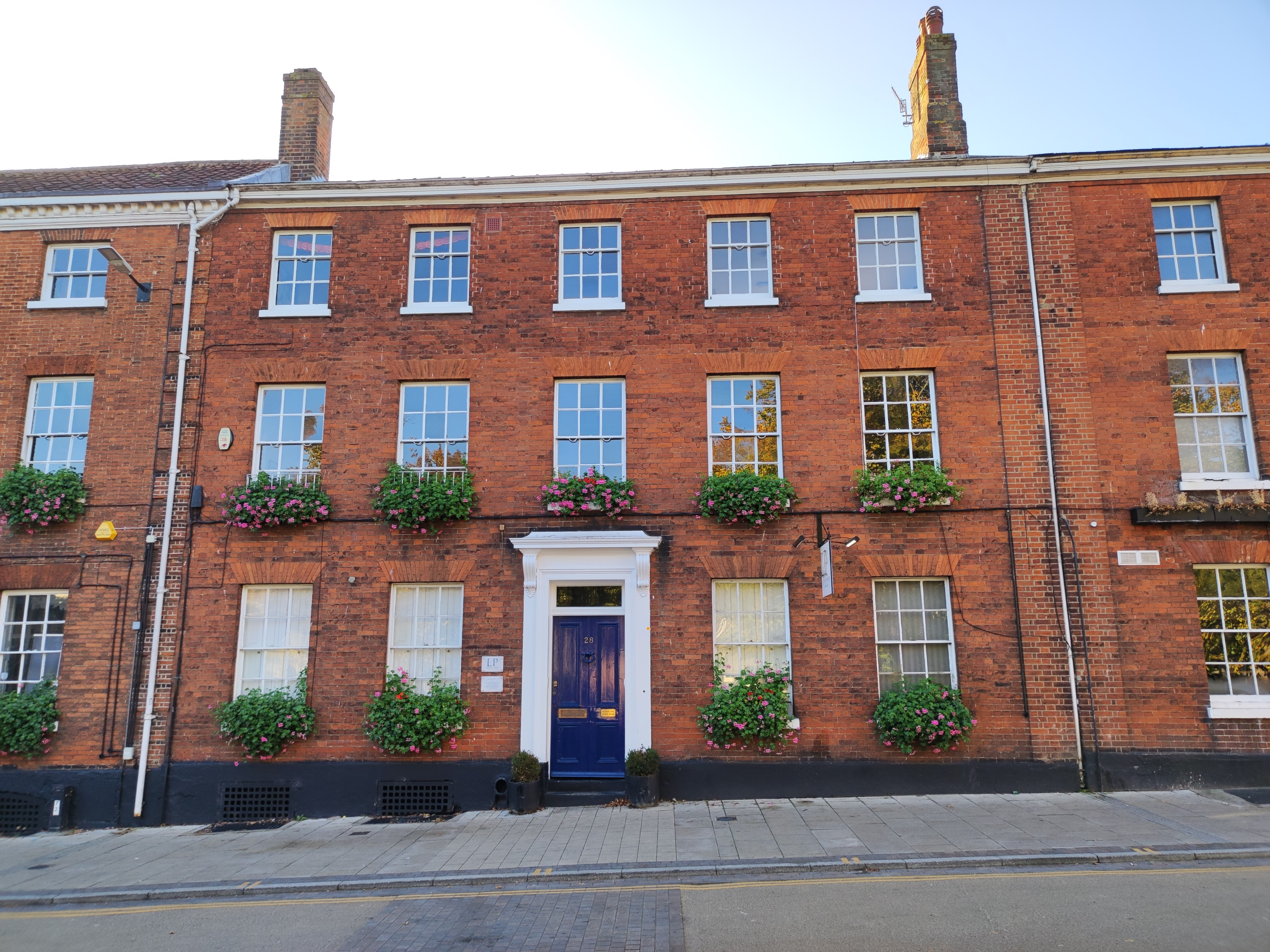
28 Tombland (TG 23359 08741), where the Jenny Lind temporarily resided from 1898 to 1902

In 1898, the hospital temporarily moved to 28 Tombland in the city centre, close to Norwich Cathedral, for four years in order for new buildings to be constructed in Unthank Road. In 1900, the hospital began to move into a permanent and purpose-built site on Unthank Road on the outskirts of the city. Resident medical officers at this time included Doctors Lucy Muir and Mary Bell; these were some of the first qualified women practitioners in the city.

In 1909, surgical admissions to the hospital exceeded its medical admissions for the first time. That year, the Jenny Lind hospital claimed financial support for 'education committee' patients. The hospital expanded further as a result of the growth of the Schools' Medical Service and a transfer of children to the Jenny Lind from the Norfolk and Norwich Hospital in 1914. In 1918, it changed its name to the Jenny Lind Hospital for Sick Children. By 1920, the hospital had 80 beds, treating 1,300 inpatients per year. A full transfer of around 2,000 outpatients from Pottergate took place in 1929, and the management of the hospital's nursing became the responsibility of the Norfolk and Norwich Hospital the same year. After this, a rise in patient numbers by two thirds took place over the next 20 years. Nurse training was lacking as it could only be offered conjointly with the Norfolk and Norwich Hospital.

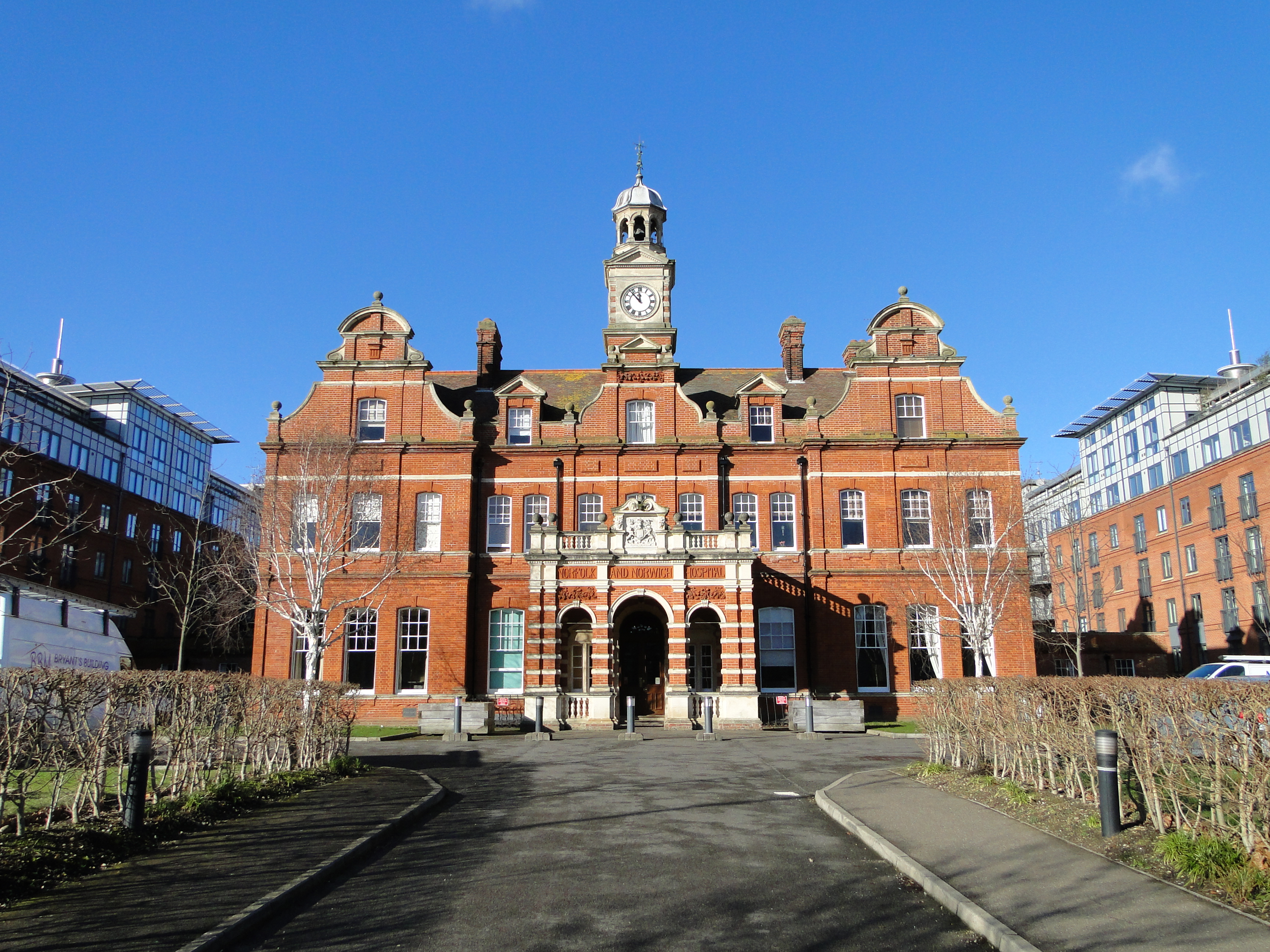
The Jenny Lind moved into the Norfolk and Norwich Hospital in 1975 as a department

The Jenny Lind became part of the National Health Service in 1948. By the 1950s, there was a return of the acceptance of visitors to patients, and these visitors began to obtain a prime place in the hospital's function. The existing stresses on the hospital, as well as financial pressure and overlapping consultant staff, continued to be prominent until the children's hospital was incorporated into the Norfolk and Norwich Hospital in 1975, moving in and thus becoming the hospital's Jenny Lind Children’s Department.

=== As part of Norfolk and Norwich University Hospital ===
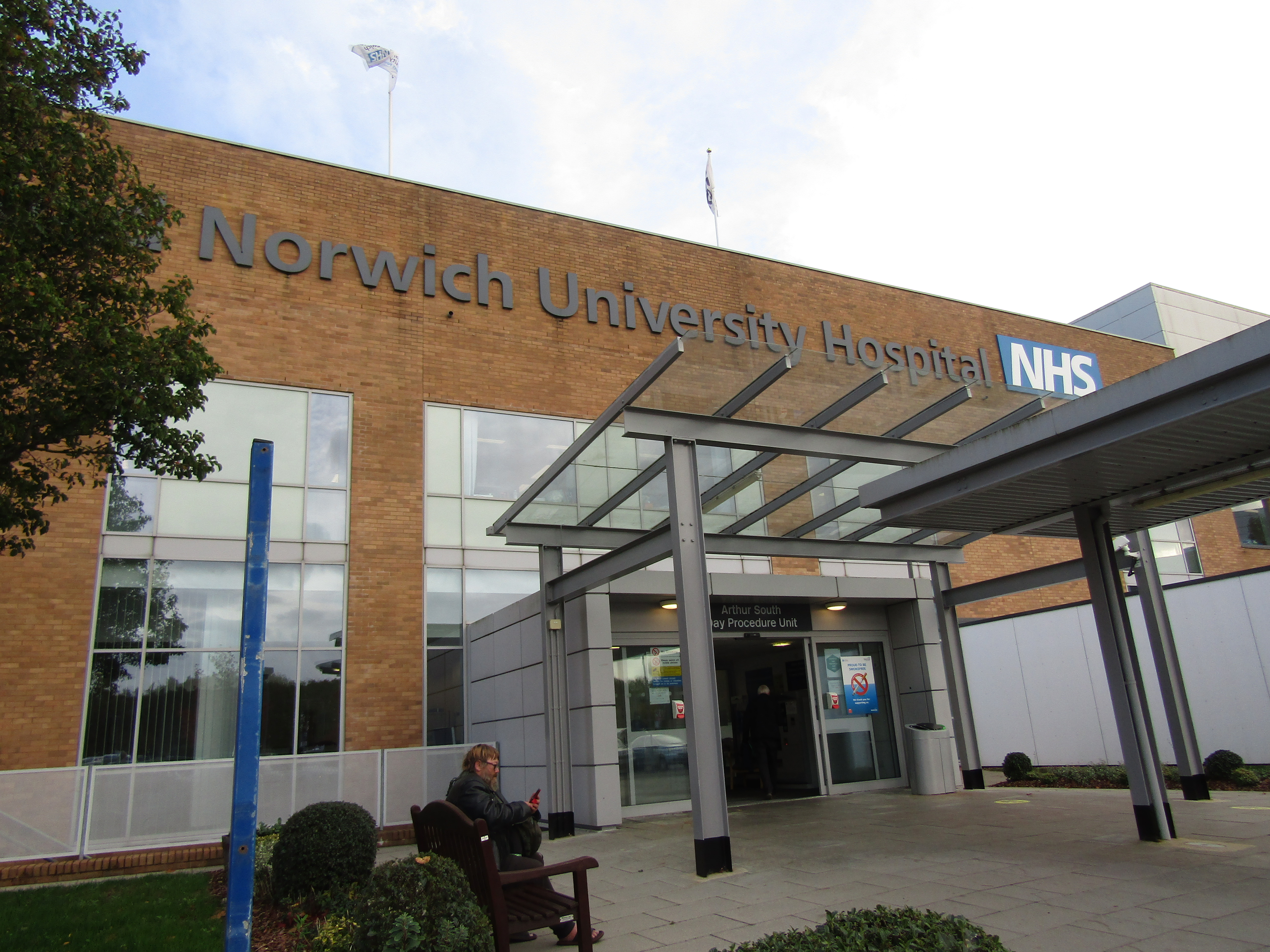
Norfolk and Norwich University Hospital in 2022

In 2001, Jenny Lind Children's Hospital later moved to Norfolk and Norwich University Hospital, becoming a regional centre as part of the Norfolk and Norwich University Hospital Trust. In 2023, over 1,000 babies were treated at the hospital's neonatal intensive care unit. In January 2024, it opened an £8.6 million specialist children's theatre unit, which included two theatres and a recovery unit. On its 170th anniversary, the hospital said it had treated over 4 million children since opening in 1854. This was celebrated with a visit to the patients by clowns and Norfolk storyteller Amanda Smith who performed a reimagining of the life of Jenny Lind.
