= Robert Aylmer =

English politician

Robert Aylmer (d.1493), of Norwich, Norfolk, was an English politician.

== Life ==
Aylmer was originally a grocer. He became Sheriff of Norwich in 1471, Alderman of Norwich in 1480, and Mayor of Norwich in 1481 and 1492. He wife was named Elizabeth.

Aylmer's will, written on 3 July 1493, included a large donation to St. Giles's Hospital.

Aylmer's mark, with his initials, is in several of the south windows in the clerestory of St. Andrew's Church, Norwich. His gravestone, dated 1493, lies under the font.

Elizabeth, Aylmer's widow, gave 10 marks towards finishing the church, and her best gilt chalice.

== Family ==
Children of Robert Aylmer and Elizabeth:

- Richard
- Thomas (d.1500)
- Cecile
- Elizabeth (d. 15 September 1493)
