= Fabio Rugge =

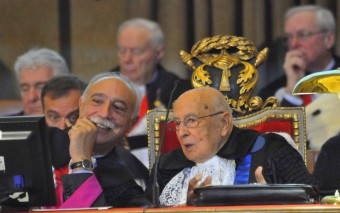
- Rector Fabio Rugge during the annual ceremony for the new academic year together with the President of the Republic Giorgio Napolitano

Rector of the University of Pavia
- Incumbent
- Assumed office 1 October 2013
- In office 1 October 2013 – 1 October 2019

Personal details
- Born: 15 September 1951 (age 75) Lecce, Italy
- Education: Università Cattolica del Sacro Cuore
- Profession: Political scientist

Fabio Rugge (born 15 September 1951) is an Italian political scientist, academic and provost. In June 2013 he was elected rector of the University of Pavia, that upon his retirement bestowed on him the title Professor Emeritus.

== Early life, education and career ==
Fabio Rugge was born and raised in Lecce, Italy. After classical studies at Liceo G. Palmieri in Lecce, he attended the Università Cattolica del Sacro Cuore in Milan where he graduated in Political Science. He embarked on his academic career in 1977 at the Department of Sociology at the University of Trento. He was an Alexander von Humboldt Fellow at Technische Universität Berlin (1986), a Jemolo Fellow at the Nuffield College, Oxford (1996) and a Woodrow Wilson Fellow at the Woodrow Wilson International Center for Scholars (2012).

He was a member of the Executive Committee of the International Social Science Council and has served for seven years on the History of Administration working group of the International Institute of Administrative Sciences in Brussels. Since 1991, he has also been part of the scientific committee of the Istituto per la Scienza dell'Amministrazione Pubblica in Milan and as of 2015 he has become a member of the Rectors' Advisory Group of the Coimbra Group.

His areas of interest cover governmental institutions and public administrations which he analyzes in a historical context, comparing developments in different European countries. His works have been widely published in book form and journals. He sits on the editorial boards of several journals including Il Politico, Grotius, and Storia Amministrazione Costituzione (which he co-directs).

From 2005 to 2011 he headed the Department of Political Science at the University of Pavia. He was a member of the board of directors of the G. Romagnosi Foundation, which he helped to found in 2003 and chaired until 2011. Over the years, he has advised many public bodies (among others: the regional councils of Lombardy, Veneto and Trentino Alto-Adige).

In 2006 Rugge became a Commander of the Order of Merit of the Italian Republic. Later, in 2020, he was appointed Grand Officer of the Order of Merit of the Italian Republic.

== Boards and Committees ==
In 2013 he became a member of the Conference of Italian University Rectors and later a member of its board. Since 2015 he has been appointed to lead the committee for international relations.

As rector of the University of Pavia, in September 2015 he also became the President of the board of directors of the Foundation of the C. Mondino Neurological Institute, which controls the C. Mondino Hospital. He is one of the two ex-officio members of the board of directors of the S. Maugeri Foundation, which operates in the field of rehabilitation therapies in Lombardy and controls several clinics for occupational health all over Italy. He is also part of the executive board of the CNAO Foundation that is engaged in the fight against cancer.

In addition, he is one of members of the advisory board that provides strategic advice to the management of Confindustria in Pavia.

He is a member of the board of directors of Orchestra Sinfonica di Milano Giuseppe Verdi.

== Personal life ==
Fabio Rugge is married and has two sons. He also has one older brother, Massimo Rugge, who is an Italian pathologist and oncologist and one cousin, Massimo Bertarelli, who is an Italian journalist and film critic.

== See also ==
- Rugge-Price baronets
- Robert Rugge (1503-1559)

== Civil awards and decorations ==
Italy Commander of the Order of Merit of the Italian Republic

Italy Grand Officer of the Order of Merit of the Italian Republic
