= George Henry Morse =

English brewer, administrator and mountaineer

Sir George Henry Morse (27 May 1857 – 1 April 1931) was an English brewer, administrator and mountaineer. He was Lord Mayor of Norwich and later President of the Alpine Club.

== Early life ==
Morse was born in 1857, second son of Charles Morse of Aylsham, Norfolk, JP, DL, a barrister and partner in the brewery of Steward, Patteson Fitch & Co., and Mary Harriet, daughter of Commander Robert Isacke, of the East India Company's Navy. The Morses were a junior branch of a landed gentry family of Lound, Suffolk, with a long history in Norwich; Charles Morse's great-grandfather, John Morse, was Mayor of Norwich for 1781. Charles Morse was also an alpinist and had joined the Alpine Club in 1863.

== Career ==
Morse became a successful brewer and a Justice of the Peace in the city of Norwich. Morse had a younger brother, Arthur Francis Morse, who served in the 6th (Inniskilling) Dragoons and retired from the army as a colonel.

Morse was Mayor of Norwich for 1899, then Lord Mayor of Norwich for 1922–1923, after King Edward VII had elevated the title. In the 1923 Birthday Honours he was appointed a knight bachelor. In 1927 Morse was a director of both principal Norwich Union companies, for Fire Insurance and Life Insurance. By 1931 he had served as chairman of the first and president of the second.

A Conservative in politics, Morse was a member of the Alpine Club, of which he was President between 1926 and 1929, and also of the Junior Carlton Club. At the time of his death in 1931 his address was given in Who's Who as "Thorpe St Andrew, Norwich". He left a substantial estate worth £143,449 after liabilities and duties. His obituary in the Alpine Journal said of him

Though it is a heresy to suggest it, George Morse was, in my opinion, one of the very best guides of his day. And he was one of the best companions.

== Personal life ==
In 1893, Morse married Annie, a daughter of Mark Henry Pasteur, JP, of Wynches, Much Hadham, Hertfordshire, and of Le Grand-Saconnex, Geneva, Switzerland. They had three sons (the second, Francis John Morse, was father of the banker and cruciverbalist Sir Jeremy Morse) and one daughter. They lived at Beech Hill, Thorpe St Andrew, Norfolk. His widow died in 1946.
