= James Crowe (surgeon) =

British surgeon

James Crowe (c. 1750 – 1807) was a British surgeon and twice Mayor of Norwich.

Crowe lived at Old Lakenham near Norwich. He was an alderman of Norwich and elected as mayor in 1774 and 1797.

Crowe had an interest in botany and was noted for his collection of willow species. He became a Fellow of the Linnean Society in 1788.

The Australian plant genus Crowea was named in his honour by botanist James Edward Smith in 1798.
