= Valerie Guttsman =

Valerie Guttsman (née Lichtigová; 3 June 1918 – 29 September 2009) O.B.E. was a Slovak-born British social worker, councillor and Lord Mayor of Norwich.

== Personal life ==
Valerie Lichtigová was born on 3 June 1918 in the village of Hatalov in Austria-Hungary (now Slovakia), into a Jewish family of four daughters. Her father, Herman Lichtig (d. 1940), was a travelling salesman and a member of the social democratic party of the German minority in Czechoslovakia, the DSAP. Her mother, Zephia (née Stern), had received a higher education. They moved to Prešov while Valerie was still a baby. Educated first at a Protestant secondary school, she applied to study medicine in Prague, later transferring to chemistry, albeit for a single semester. Lichtigová worked for a Zionist organisation.

Following the invasion of Czechoslovakia, five young Jewish men who had escaped Germany helped Valerie to secure the papers needed to leave for England. She left in April 1939. Both of her parents and two of her sisters, pediatrician Ella (b. 1909) and Olga Lichtigová (b. 1914), were murdered over the subsequent years under the Nazi regime. Her surviving sister, the teacher Adela Licht (b. 1912), emigrated to Palestine in 1938.

Valerie worked first in Glasgow, and subsequently on a farm near the village of Dunlop, East Ayrshire. While there, she met Wilhelm Leo Guttsman, whom she married on 11 July 1942. The couple moved to London, where Wilhelm was studying at Birkbeck College.

The couple became naturalised British citizens in 1948, with Valerie having previously been stateless. Their daughter, Janet Helen, was born in 1958.

== Career ==
In London, Valerie Guttsman was offered a job as matron at a residential home for children orphaned by the Holocaust. Six months later, she began training as a social worker. In 1951–52, she obtained a diploma in mental health from the London School of Economics, after which she worked as a social worker for the mentally ill from 1952 to 1958.

In 1962, Wilhelm Guttsman was offered the position of librarian at the newly established University of East Anglia and the family moved to Norwich. There, already a member of the Labour Party, Valerie became more actively involved. She became city councillor for Crome Ward in 1964. In the words of Phyllida Scrivens, Guttsman "quickly became the 'go to' councillor for anything related to children, health, the elderly and social services". She championed care provision, telling the county council's social services committee: "Let us put our pockets where our hearts are. Good care costs money, but bad care will cost us much more." She sat on 38 committees and sub-committees.

Elected to the Labour Party National Executive, she worked closely with Barbara Castle. For ten years from 1973 Guttsman held seats on both the Norwich City and Norfolk County Council.

Following her service as deputy lord mayor from 1976 to 1977, Guttsman was nominated Lord Mayor of Norwich at the age of 61 in 1979. During her mayoral year, she attended more than 900 functions and gave over 400 speeches.

In 1991, Guttsman was made O.B.E. "For services to the community in Norwich and Norfolk".

== Death ==
Guttsman died on 29 September 2009. Her funeral was held at Earlham Crematorium on 8 October.
