= John Clerke (died 1528) =

English politician

John Clerke (by 1476 – 22 March 1528), of Norwich, Norfolk, was an English politician.

He was born a younger son of Gregory Clerke of Norwich.

He was a common councilman of Norwich from 1501 to 1505, sheriff of Norwich for 1507–08, an alderman from 1507 to his death and Mayor of Norwich for 1515–16 and 1520–21. He was elected MP for Norwich in 1512.

He married three times.
