= Thomas Marsham (MP) =

16th-century English politician

Thomas Marsham (by 1522 – 15 September 1557), of Norwich, Norfolk was an English politician.

== Family ==
He was the son of John Marsham (d. 13 May 1525) of Norwich by Elizabeth (d.1559), daughter of Hamond Claxton of Chediston, Suffolk. Thomas Marsham had four brothers and eight sisters. Through his sister Mary Marsham he was the great-uncle of Temperance Flowerdew and John Pory.

Another sister, Elizabeth, married William Layer, Mayor of Norwich, and was the mother of Christopher Layer, merchant, burgess of Norwich, and briefly a Member of Parliament.

His sister Margaret Marsham was buried by her father in 1563.

Thomas Marsham married a woman named Elizabeth, and they seem to have had no children.

He left Elizabeth his wife, and Ralph his brother, each a moiety of the manor of Little Melton. His brother Ralph Marsham was the great-grandfather of Sir John Marsham, 1st Baronet, the father of Sir Robert Marsham, 4th Baronet of Bushey Hall, Hertfordshire and the grandfather of Robert Marsham, 1st Baron Romney.

== Career ==
He was a grocer and a Member of Parliament (MP) for Norwich in March 1553, as well as mayor of the city in 1554–55.

== St. John's Maddermarket ==
Thomas Marsham was buried in St. John's Maddermarket. Both his father, his mother and his sister Margaret rest in the same church.
