= Norwich Law Courts =

Judicial building in Norwich, England

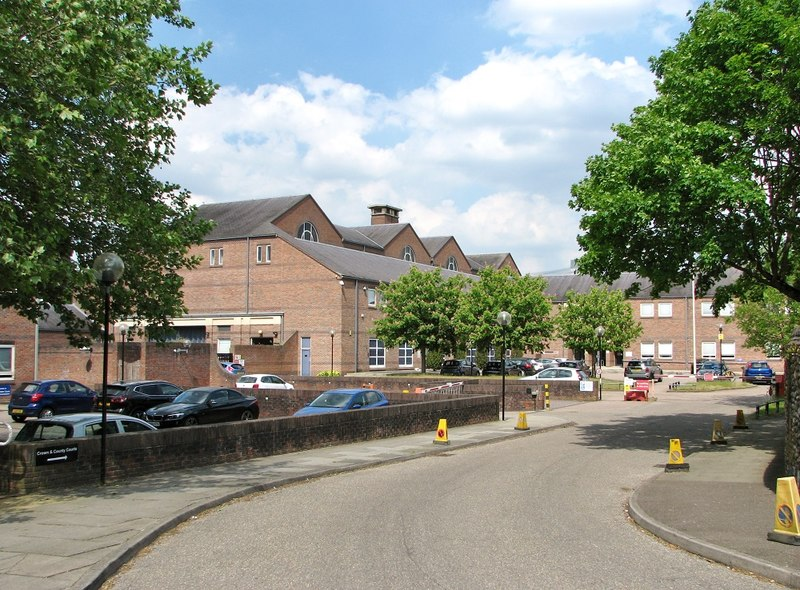
- Norwich Law Courts

- Shown in Norfolk
- 52.6347°N 1.3023°E
- Location: Bishopgate, Norwich

History
- Built: 1988

Site notes
- Architect: Property Services Agency
- Architectural style: Debased neoclassical style

The Norwich Law Courts is a Crown Court venue, which deals with criminal cases, as well as a County Court venue, which deals with civil cases, in Bishopgate, Norwich, England.

== History ==
Originally, all criminal court and civil court hearings were held in the trial room in the Guildhall which dated back to the early 15th century. However, as the number of court cases in Norwich grew, it became necessary to commission a more modern courthouse. The site selected by the Lord Chancellor's Department was occupied by the old Bishopgate Gas Works which was built in the mid-19th century. An archaeological survey on the site revealed part of a house dating back to the 12th century, and, opposite the entrance to the site, on the other side of Bishopgate, was the spot where Lord Sheffield died during Kett's Rebellion in July 1549.

The first new structure was the new magistrates' court building, on the southwest part of the site, which was designed by the city architect, Robert Goodyear, in the debased neoclassical style, built in red brick and was completed in 1985. This was followed by the crown and county courts, on the northeast part of the site, which was designed by the Property Services Agency in the same style, built in red brick at a cost of £7 million, and was completed in 1988. The design of the crown and county courts building involved two sides of a courtyard which faced southwest. The northeast side of the courtyard featured three recessed doorways on the ground floor, a Royal coat of arms above the central doorway and three pairs of small square windows on the first floor. The northwest side of the courtyard was formed by a two-storey lean-to which was fenestrated with large casement windows on the ground floor and pairs of small square windows on the first floor. There was also a second floor, which was set back, fenestrated by Diocletian windows and surmounted by gables. Internally, the building was laid out to accommodate seven courtrooms.

Notable cases have included the trial and conviction, in May 2009, of two men and a woman, for the murder of Simon Everitt, in a re-enactment of a scene from the horror film, Severance.
