= George Stevens Pope =

Dr. George Stevens Pope L.R.C.P., L.R.C.S., L.R.F.P.S.
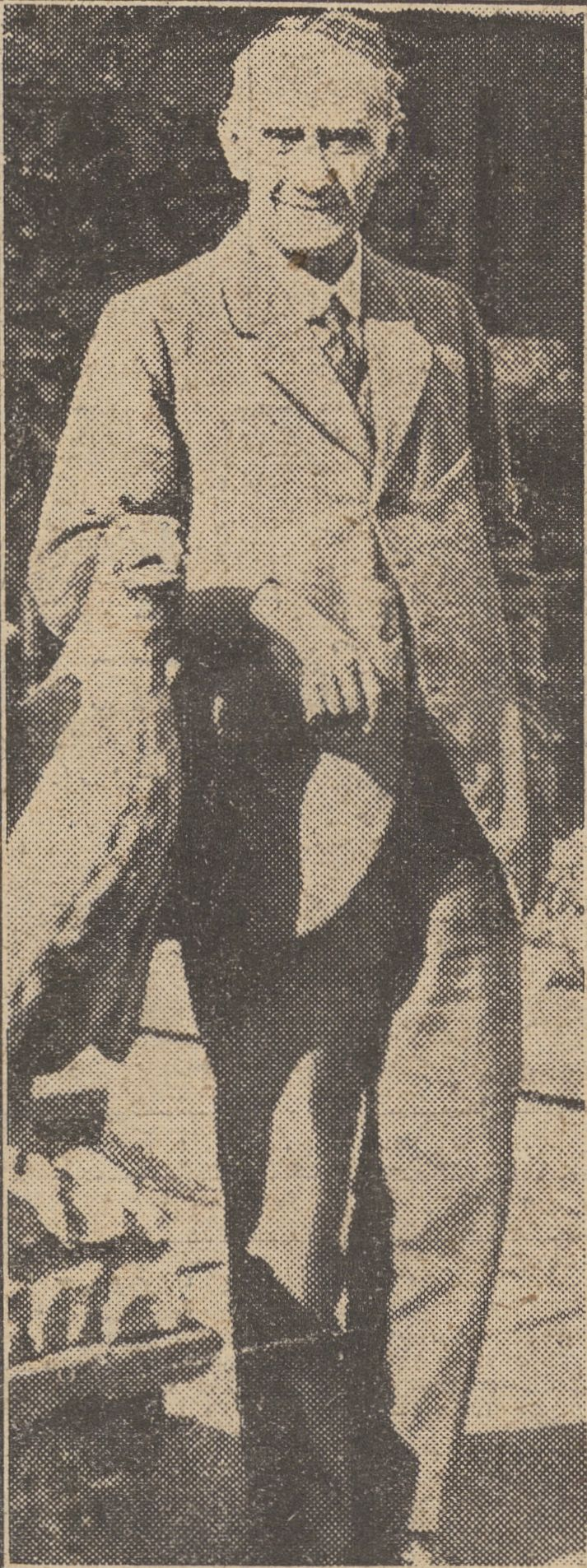
- Born: 1864
- Died: November 1932 (aged 67–68)
- Education: Victoria University of Manchester, University of Edinburgh
- Occupation: Psychiatrist
- Known for: Being Lord Mayor of Norwich 1924–5.
- Father: George Uglow Pope

Dr George Stevens Pope (1864 – 5 November 1932) was an English psychiatrist, and Lord Mayor of Norwich 1924–5.

== Early life ==
George Stevens Pope was born in India, the son of Reverend George Uglow Pope, a missionary and Tamil scholar.

Pope trained as a barrister, but never practiced. Instead, he studied medicine at Victoria University of Manchester, and the University of Edinburgh.

== Medical career ==
Pope worked at London's Cane Hill Hospital, the Retreat, York, and as superintendent of the Middlesbrough Lunatic Asylum. In 1905, he was appointed Medical Superintendent of the Somerset and Baths Asylum at Wells, where he remained for 15 years, until 1920.

Pope became Resident Physician and Licensee at Heigham Hall, and "private lunatic asylum" in Norwich. His wife, Louisa, was listed as Lady Superintendent and Licensee on the census entry for 1921. Pope was the long time partner of Dr John Gordon Gordon-Munn, also of Heigham Hall.

== Political life ==
Pope was elected Lord Mayor of Norwich in 1924, in that capacity welcoming the Duke and Duchess of York to Norwich for the opening of the Bridewell Museum, and formally opening Wensum Park. He was leader of the Conservative Party in the city–a representative of Heigham Ward–and chairman of the Norfolk Agricultural Wages Committee.

In 1929, while Chairman of the Norwich Public Health Committee, he was on the panel that interviewed and hired George Plunkett for the position of junior clerk in the Norwich Public Health Department. Pope was involved with many sports and social clubs, and was a prominent Freemason, having been Senior Grand Warden of Norfolk. He was a Justice of the Peace, chairman of the District Nursing Association, and a representative of the Norwich Division of the British Medical Association, serving as chairman of the latter 1925–6.

At the time of his death, Pope was Deputy Lord Mayor of Norwich.

== Death ==
Pope died in Norwich in 1932, and his funeral was held at Eaton Cemetery. A memorial service was held at Norwich Cathedral.

An obituary published in the Eastern Daily Press stated that:

Few men in the long role of eminent Mayors and Lord Mayors of Norwich brought such brilliant gifts to the service of the city as Dr. Pope, and fewer still rose so quickly to the highest civic office after election to the City Council... Always his speeches had a quality of freshness and originality which made him a popular figure wherever he went.

He was survived by his wife, Louisa, and daughter, Dorothy Ethel Uglow Pope. A portrait of Pope by Florence Maidie Buckingham (1901–1988) is in the Norfolk Museums Service collections.
