= George Chamberlin =

British businessman and Mayor of Norwich (1846–1928)

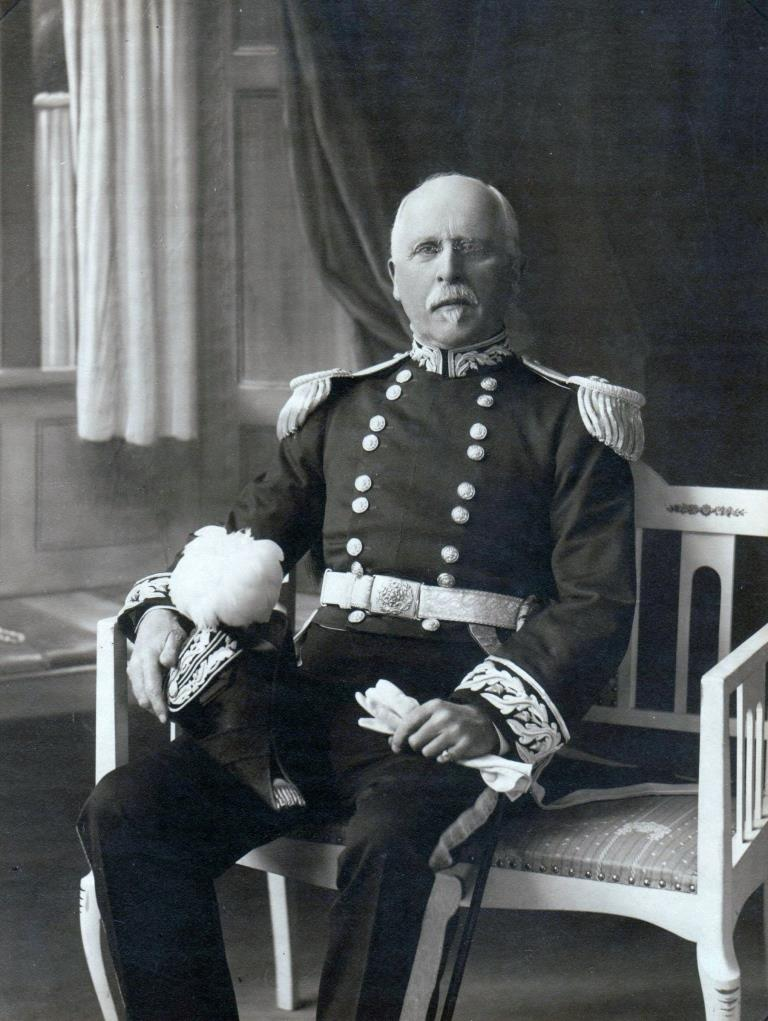
- George Chamberlin in his uniform as Deputy Lieutenant, 1911
- Born: 1846
- Died: 1928 (aged 81–82)
- Occupation: Businessman

Sir George Moore Chamberlin (1846–1928) was a prominent Norfolk businessman. The firm of Chamberlin & Sons (created in 1815) owned a large department store in Guildhall Hill in Norwich, as well as a textile factory in Botolph Street which specialised in the manufacture of waterproof clothing.

== Business career ==
As well as being managing director of the extensive family firm, which not only ran the huge drapers' and furnishers' shop but also several clothing and carpet factories in the city, he also was director of other business in Norwich, including Norwich Union Life and Fire Offices and the Norwich Electric Tramways Company, as well as businesses in London including Swan & Edgar in Regent Street, and hotels in Bournemouth and Brighton.

== Political career ==
Sir George Chamberlin (he was knighted in 1919) was described as "a strong Conservative"; he was for many years leader of the party in Norwich. He was three times Chief Magistrate of Norwich as well as Sheriff, Mayor of Norwich (1891), Deputy Lord Mayor and Lord Mayor of Norwich (1916 and 1918), and Deputy Lieutenant and High Sheriff of Norfolk (1926).

He was heavily involved in charitable and philanthropic institutions, including the Association of Trade Protection Societies of which he was president for 25 years.
