= John Gordon Gordon-Munn =

Scots-born physician and psychiatrist

Dr John Gordon Gordon-Munn FRSE (1863 – 29 November 1949) was a Scots-born physician and psychiatrist who became Lord Mayor of Norwich.

== Life ==
Gordon-Munn was born in Edinburgh around 1863 the son of David Munn FRSE, a mathematics teacher at the Royal High School. The family lived at 11 Gayfield Square at the top of Leith Walk. He was educated at the Royal High School and then studied medicine at the University of Edinburgh, graduating with an MA MB around 1883, and gaining a doctorate (MD) around 1885.

In 1897 he was elected a Fellow of the Royal Society of Edinburgh. His proposers were Thomas Grainger Stewart, James Crichton-Browne, Thomas Annandale, and Sir Alexander Russell Simpson. At this time he was living at 1 Albyn Place in Edinburgh's New Town.

From 1899 to 1901, during the Second Boer War in South Africa, he served as a surgeon in the Grenadier Guards.

Through the 20th century he was owner and Resident Physician of the Heigham Hall Private Asylum, near Norwich. He also served as Medical Officer to the Grenadier Guards.

He served as Lord Mayor of Norwich for the year 1914/15. In 1915 he formed three pals battalions, all attached to the Royal Engineers. All suffered heavy losses in the First World War.

He died on 29 November 1949.
