= John Aldrich (MP) =

16th-century English politician

John Aldrich (by 1520 – 1582), of Norwich, Norfolk, was an English politician.

Aldrich was the third surviving son of Thomas Aldrich, alderman and mercer of Norwich, and Elizabeth Wood of Fulbourne, Cambridgeshire. He was born sometime before 1520. By 1540, he had married Elizabeth Sotherton, daughter of Nicholas Sotherton. They had three sons and two daughters. One of his sons was Thomas Aldrich, a clergyman and academic who served as master of Corpus Christi College, Cambridge.

Aldrich was a Member of Parliament (MP) for Norwich 1555 and 1572 and mayor of the city in 1557-1558 and 1570–1571. He served as sheriff of Norwich in 1551–1552.

Aldrich died in 1582.
