= St Andrew's and Blackfriars' Hall =

Former friary in Norwich, UK

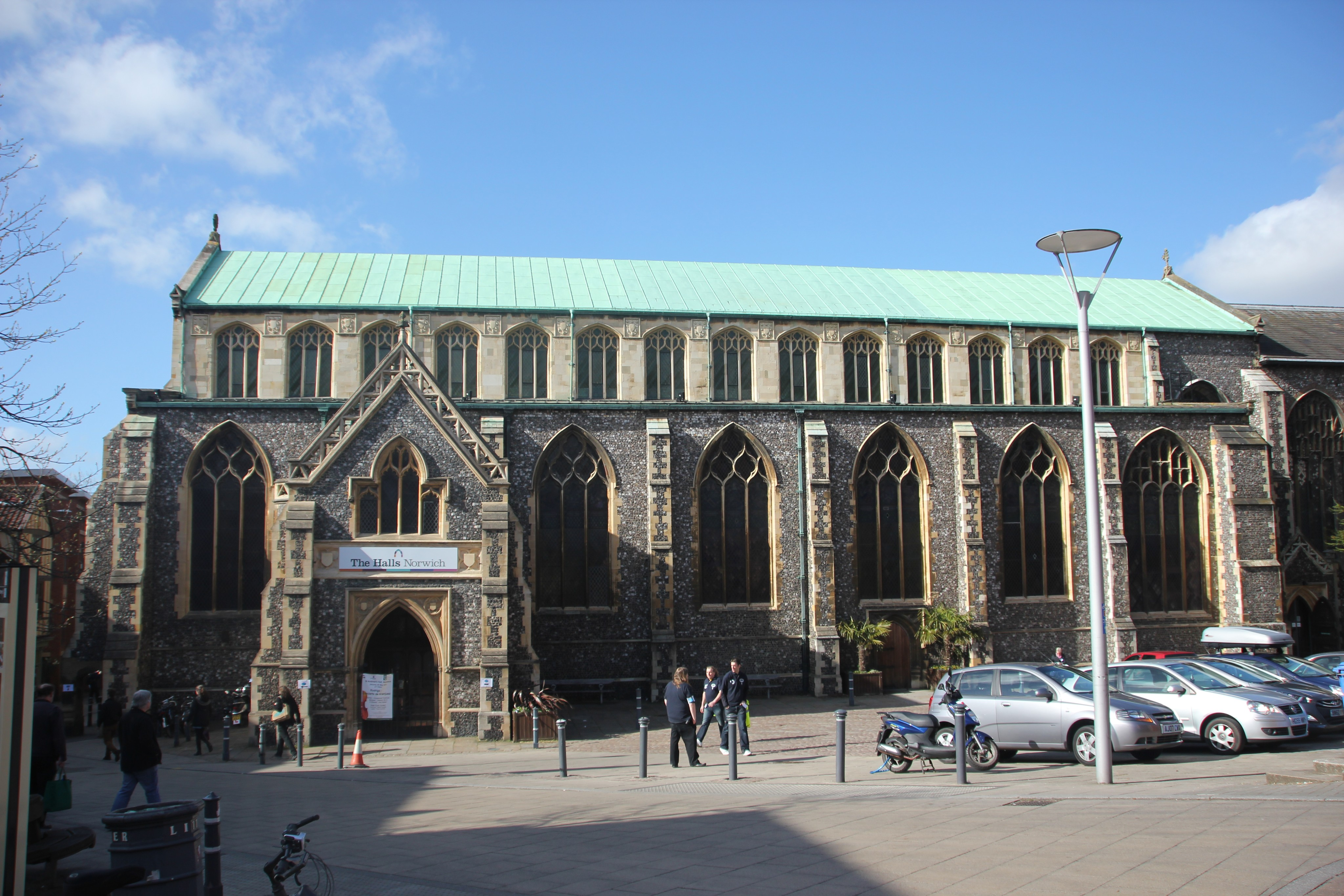
- St Andrew's Hall in 2013

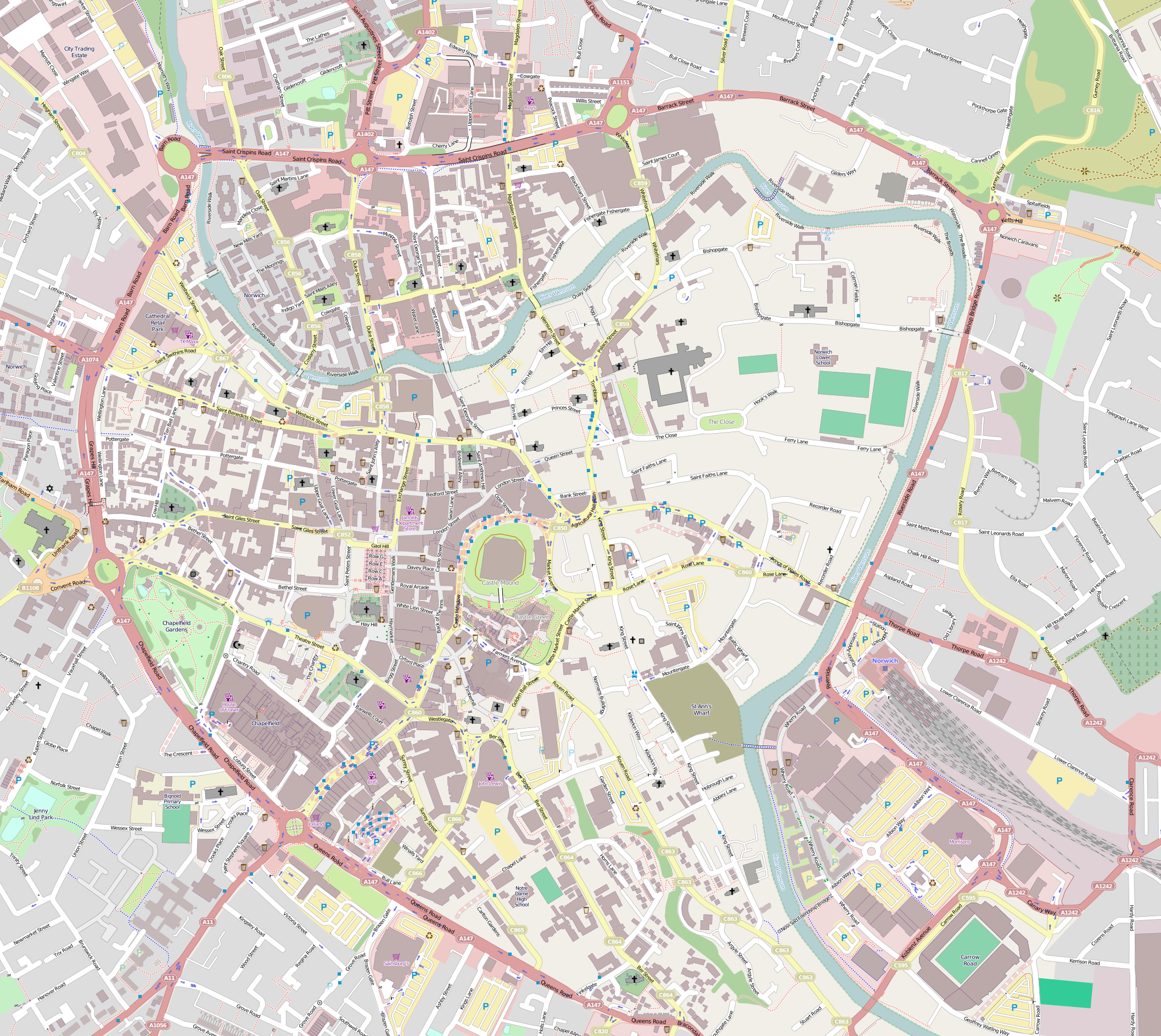
- Location within Norwich Location within Norfolk
- 52.6311°N 1.2957°E
- Type: Former priory church and convent buildings
- Location: Norwich, United Kingdom
- OS grid reference: TG2314108814

History
- Built: 1258 onward
- Rebuilt: c. 1440–1470

Site notes
- Governing body: Norwich City Council

Listed Building – Grade I
- Official name: Former Dominican Friary (Blackfriars) Norwich: St Andrew's Hall and Blackfriars' Hall, The Crypt, the south range, the East Garth and east cloister walk, the West Garth, and west boundary wall
- Designated: 26 February 1954
- Reference no.: 1220456

Scheduled monument
- Official name: The Dominican Friary (Blackfriars) Norwich: Becket’s Chapel, Chapter House, North Range, standing remains in the East Garth, and buried remains
- Designated: 21 May 1915
- Reference no.: 1004053

St Andrew's and Blackfriars' Hall, or The Halls, is a Grade I listed complex of former Dominican priory church and convent buildings in the English city of Norwich, Norfolk. They are the most complete set of pre-Reformation mendicant monastic structures to survive in England. Parts of the former friary are a scheduled monument, and the site is one of the Norwich 12 heritage sites.

The site was from 1258 occupied by the Penitential Friars who built a chapel and vestibule there. The suppression of these friars by Pope Clement V led to the Dominican Order taking over the site by royal licence in 1307, and they significantly expanded the precinct and buildings. A large fire in 1413 damaged the buildings, and they were rebuilt enough for the Dominican friars to return by 1449; this included the construction of the church building which now forms the two halls.

The Norwich City Corporation bought the building during the Reformation. Under plans by mayor Augustine Steward it was split into two; the chancel, now Blackfriars' Hall, became a chapel, and the nave, now St Andrew's Hall, was converted into a common hall. From 1544 St Andrew's Hall was used for civic occasions, with major public meetings taking place there from 1819. During the 19th century Jenny Lind and Reverend Thomas Archibald Wheeler respectively performed and spoke in St Andrew's Hall, and Benjamin Britten performed there in 1936.

The site closed temporarily in 2024 for structural work and renovations.

== History ==
=== As a friary ===
in 1258, the Penitential Friars, also known as the Friars of the Sack, settled in Norwich in the parishes of St Andrew and St Peter Hungate, south of the River Wensum. These friars established a chapel, originally dedicated to Saint Mary but subsequently re-dedicated to Saint Thomas-a-Becket, as well as an adjacent vestibule that is known as the Crypt in the present day. Pope Clement V suppressed the Penitential Friars, and thus by the early 14th century this group was in decline.

A nearby friary of the Dominican Order had also been established to the north of the River Wensum, between what is now Colegate and Golden Dog Lane, after the Dominicans arrived in 1221. In 1307, this religious order immediately took over the site by royal licence following the Penitential Friars' suppression, under the condition that they would care for the last remaining friar. They remodelled the existing buildings, inserting brick vaulted ceilings to support the upper floors. Between 1310 and 1325, they also obtained the surrounding properties to expand the friary, taking up the area between the river to the north, Princes Street on the south, St George's Street on the west and Monastery Lane and Elm Hill on the east. Six of these plots were purchased from William But, a member of a wealthy family of hosiers. A new cloister was constructed. On the east side the friars built a dorter (dormitory) and chapter house, on the west was built a frater (refectory), and at the north were likely kitchens and storerooms. In 1326, there were 53 friars at the site. From circa 1327, a church dedicated to Saint John the Baptist was built at the south, on the site of what are the present-day halls. A royal sanction was given to construct over two roads, including the former course of Elm Hill, in 1345, allowing the completion of the west end of the church; this allowed the church to be completed using money from donations. The church was 265 feet (81 m) long.

A serious fire in Norwich in 1413 severely damaged the Dominican’s church conventual buildings and killed two of the friars. As such, the friars moved back to the original site, rebuilding the Blackfriars site until moving back in 1449. The second church building which survives today was reconstructed between circa 1440 and 1470, and included several windows from the earlier building. The nave of the new church now forms St Andrew's Hall; the chancel (of five bays), Blackfriars’ Hall. There were separated by a passage, above which was a tower.

=== Split into chapel and common hall ===
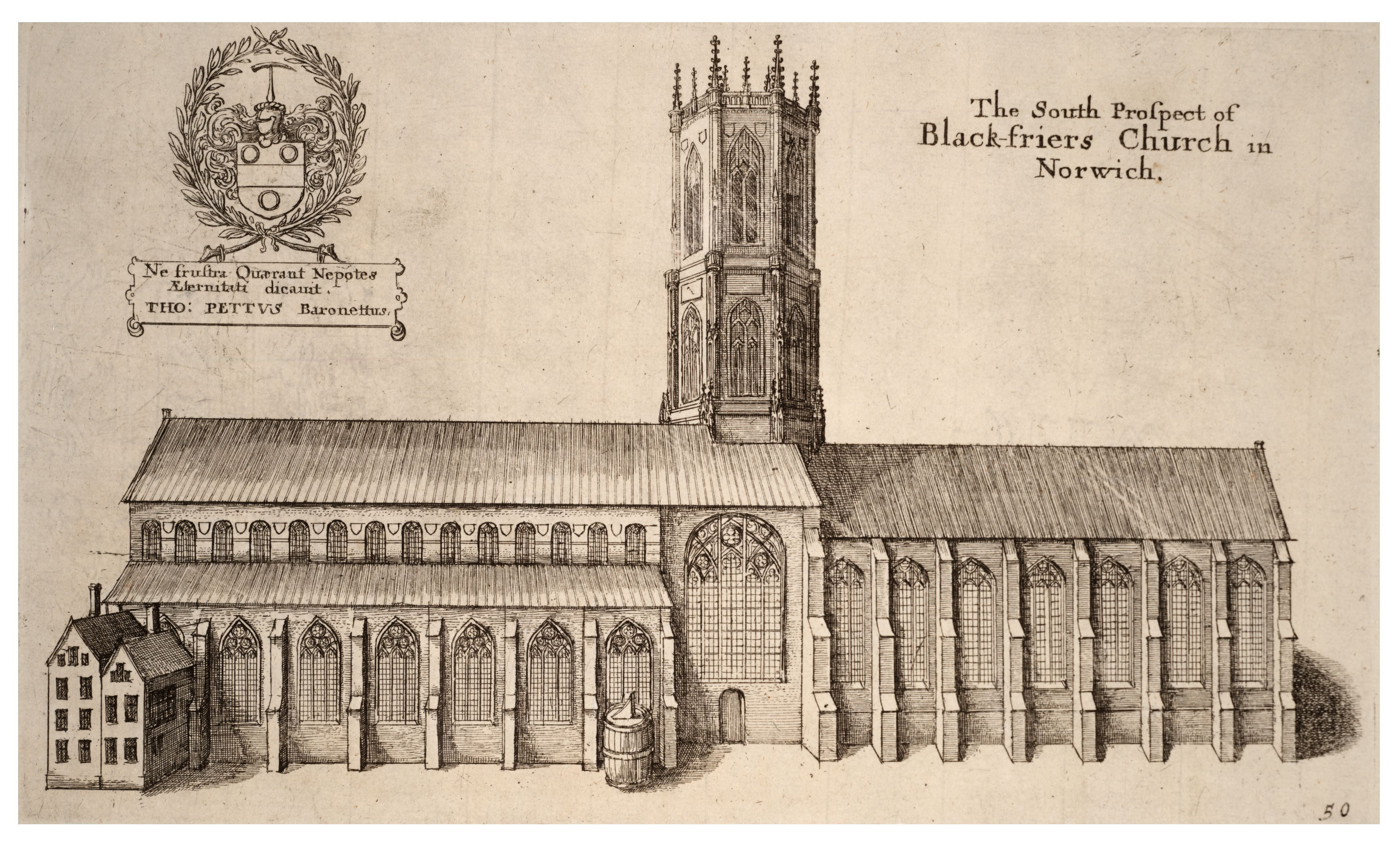
The south side of Blackfriars Church, illustrated by Wenceslaus Hollar (1607–1677). The nave (left) is now St Andrew's Hall, and the chancel (right) is Blackfriars' Hall

During the Reformation, the site was bought by the City Corporation, Mayor Augustine Steward paid £81 in 1540 and £152 in 1544. He planned it to be split into "a fayer and large halle", for which the nave, now known as St Andrew's Hall, was converted, and a chapel, "to pray to Almightye God for the prosperouse preservacyon of your most Royall estate", for which the chancel, now Blackfriars' Hall, was used. The adaptation of St Andrew's Hall for its new purpose included the erection of buildings at its west end.

In 1608, the Norwich City Library, the first independent civic library after the Reformation, was established over the north porch of St Andrew's Hall; it would go through a period of growth from 1608 to 1634 and from 1657 to 1666, both periods being followed by decline and neglect, and another revival of interest from 1692. After 1738 there was another long period of neglect. The building over the porch that housed the library was entirely replaced by a new structure between 1772 and 1775, and the library moved elsewhere after 1801.

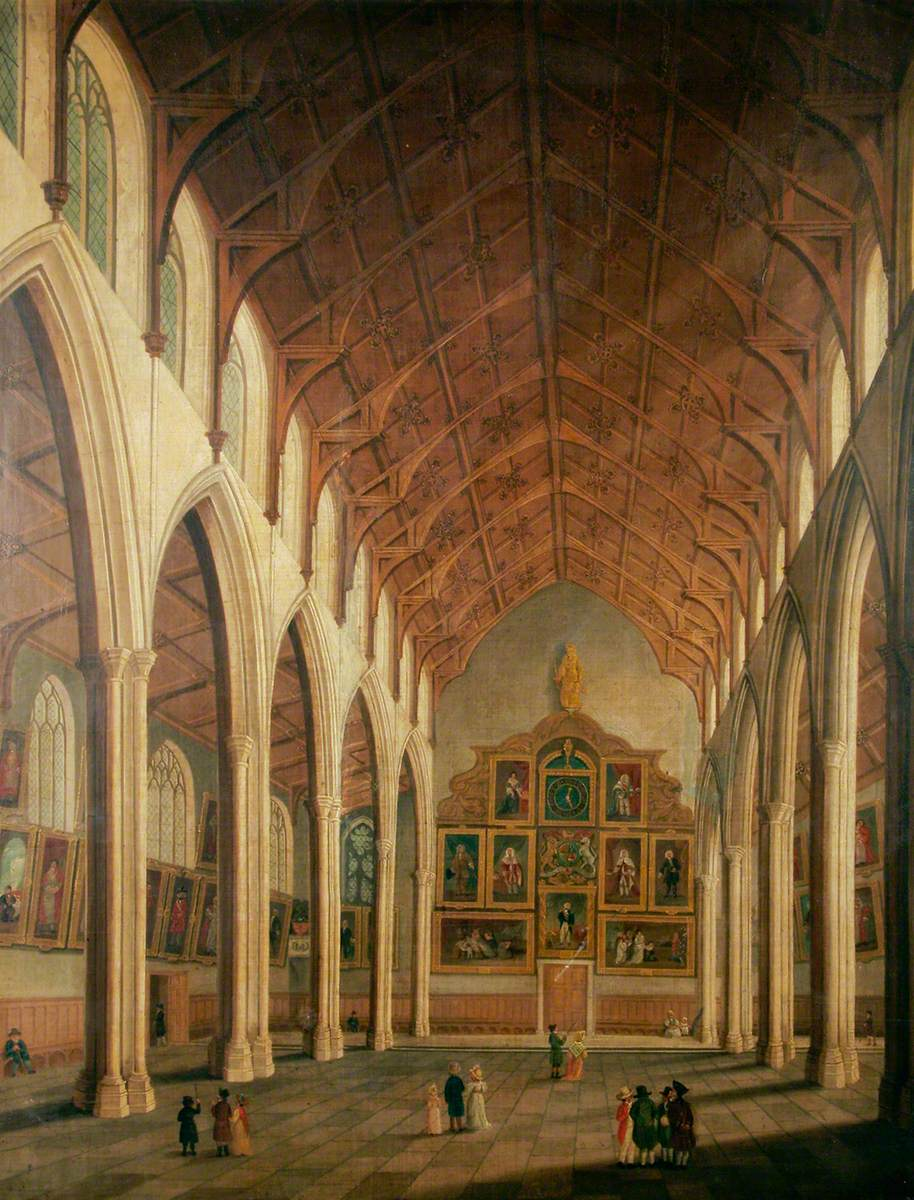
James Sillett painting of the interior of St Andrew's Hall in 1837, featuring portraits on its walls

The King's Men, a playing company associated with William Shakespeare, visited St Andrew's Hall in June 1622, but were paid a total of 40 shillings not to perform, likely so as not to offend the Puritans in the city. They returned again to the hall around 1622 or 1623 and were paid the same amount, though this time it is unclear whether they performed. In 1788, a new orchestra was introduced to the city, leading to the use of the hall as a concert hall and theatre. Following the defeat of French ship Généreux in 1800, Admiral Lord Nelson presented the ship's ensign, a French Tricolour flag, to Norwich, and it was displayed in St Andrew's Hall until 1897.

From 1819, major public meetings began to take place in St Andrew's Hall. The Norwich Triennial Festival, the third oldest in the country, began here in 1824. In January 1849, Swedish opera singer Jenny Lind performed in St Andrew's Hall, with the intention "to raise money for the poor in the city", funding the establishment of the Jenny Lind Children's Hospital five years later.

Restorations began in 1861 under J. S. Benest; he resurfaced the west end of the cloisters, and added buildings. From the end of 1861 and for two years afterward, Reverend Thomas Archibald Wheeler, an East Anglian Nonconformist, delivered a series of lectures on Sunday afternoons in St Andrew's hall for which he became well-known. At the time, St Andrew's was the largest auditorium in Norwich, and was in frequent use as a venue for large, secular gatherings. In 1863, city surveyor T. D. Barry removed the kitchens at the west end of the building, adding three windows. He also moved the doorway eastward, altered the nave roof, and built an arch at the east end of the nave.

The world premiere performance of Benjamin Britten's Our Hunting Fathers, Op. 8, occurred in St Andrew's Hall during the Norfolk and Norwich Triennial Music Festival on 25 September 1936. In 1970, the city restored the cloisters, crypt, and Becket's Chapel, also excavating the latter. Norwich Beer Festival used the venue for around 45 years until 2023, typically taking up the entire Halls. Chad Smith and Glenn Hughes played together at the venue in 2005. In 2017, the ensign of Les Généreux went on temporary display in the hall again.

=== Temporary closure ===
The Halls closed in January 2024 for a £3.6 million refurbishment funded by the British government's Town Deal scheme. This included structural work to its roof, stained-glass windows and secondary glazing, as well as a revamp of its outside space and new audiovisual equipment and lighting. By February 2025, the cost of the repairs had increased to £7.8 million after a survey which found that plastic sheeting that had been installed approximately 80 to 100 years prior had caused the buildup of moisture in the roof's timber structure.

Following the closure, bidding opened for an organisation to take over the operation of the venue for five years; both Norwich Theatre and Norwich Arts Centre placed bids and the latter was successful. However, Norwich Theatre made a legal challenge against the Council's procurement process, causing the Council to withdraw the offer of a contract from the Arts Centre. In October 2025, Norwich City Council said The Halls would return to "council operations as soon as possible".
