= Norwich Guildhall =

Municipal building in Norwich, Norfolk, England

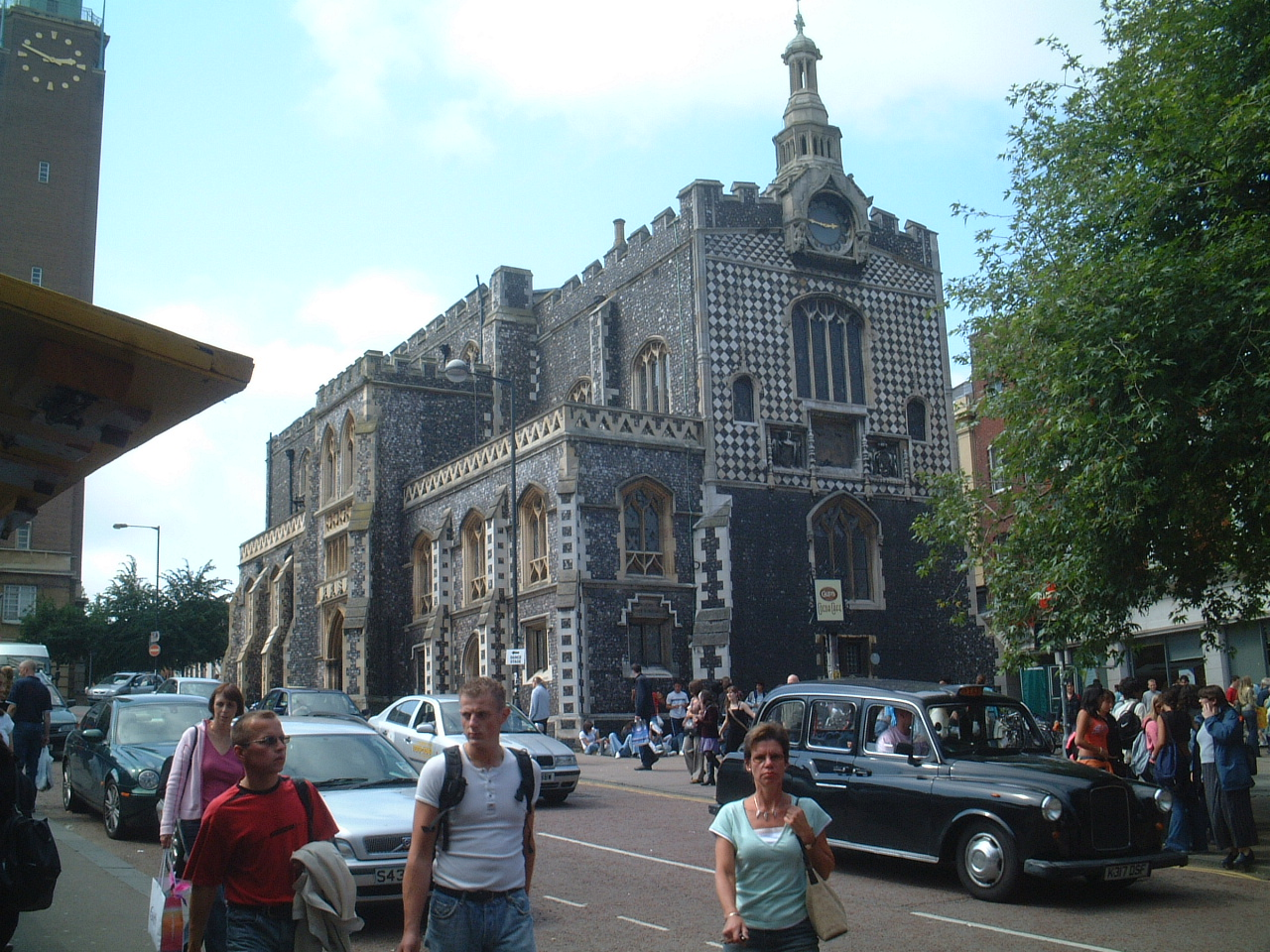
- The Guildhall

- Location within Norfolk
- 52.6290°N 1.2924°E
- Location: Norwich, Norfolk

History
- Built: 1413

Listed Building – Grade I
- Official name: The Guildhall
- Designated: 26 February 1954
- Reference no.: 1187384

Norwich Guildhall is a municipal building on Gaol Hill in the city of Norwich, Norfolk, England. It is a Grade I listed building.

== History ==
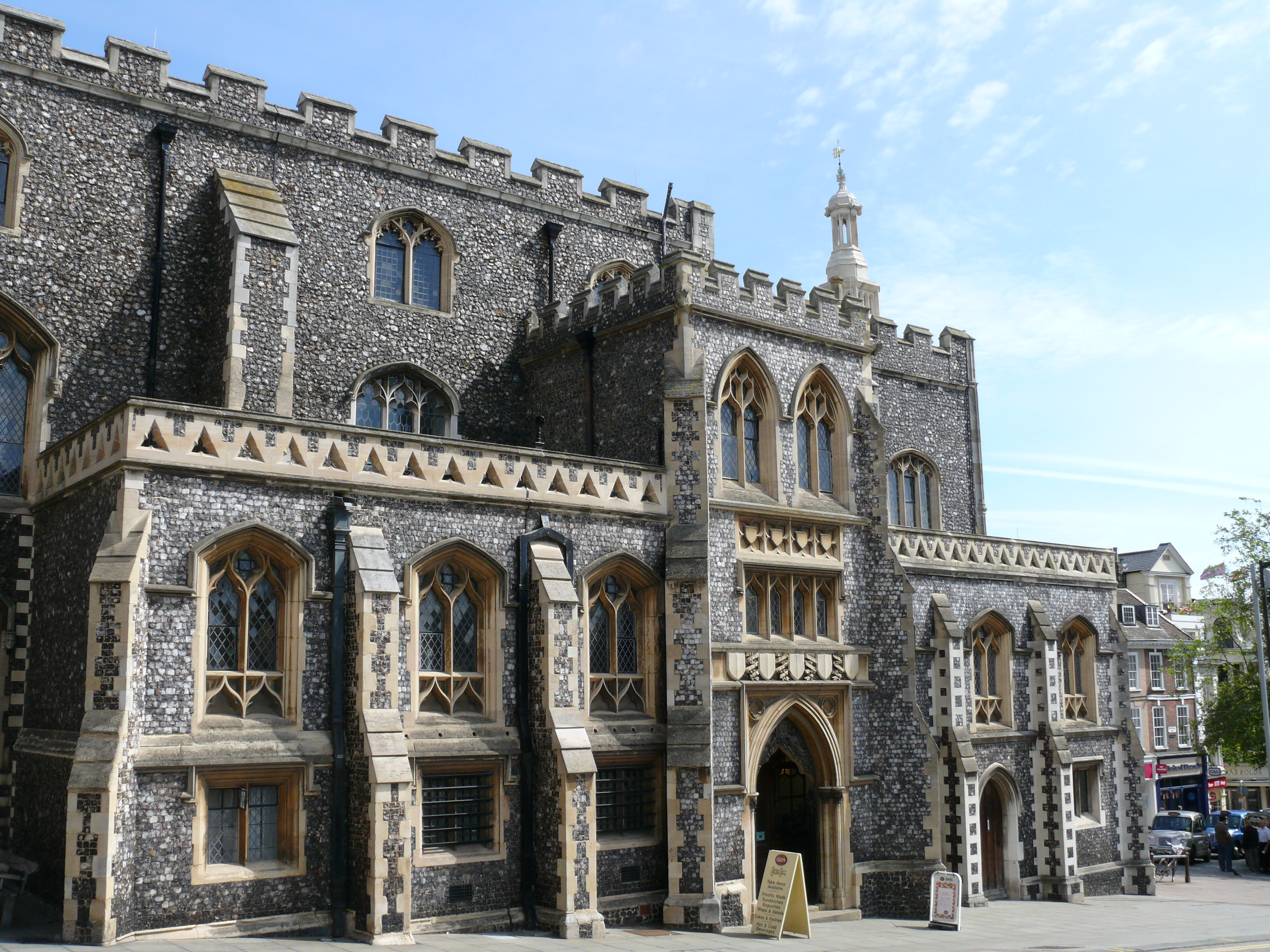
The porch added to the south side of the building in 1861

The guildhall was commissioned after King Henry IV awarded a charter to the City of Norwich giving it autonomy from the county of Norfolk. The building, which was quickly established as the new civic meeting place, was built between 1407 and 1413; a "great tree" was given by William Appleyard, the first Mayor of Norwich, for its construction. The roof of the Council Chamber collapsed in 1511 but restoration work did not begin until 1537.

The Protestant martyr, Thomas Bilney, was held in the dungeon (now the undercroft) before being burnt at the stake in August 1531. The clock, by John Moore & Sons of Clerkenwell, was a gift from Henry Woodcock, the mayor, in April 1850 and a large porch, designed by Thomas Barry, the City Surveyor, was added to the south side of the building in 1861.

King George VI and Queen Elizabeth visited the guildhall and were shown the Council Chamber on 29 October 1938. The Council Chamber ceased to be the local seat of government later that day, when the King and Queen went on to open the new City Hall. In contrast, the Great Chamber was the judicial part of the building: it accommodated the quarter sessions and then the magistrates' courts and continued in that role until the new Law Courts in Bishopgate opened in the 1980s.

In summer 2008 the guildhall became one of the twelve historic Norwich buildings in the Norwich 12 initiative, a project to develop an integrated group of heritage attractions in Norwich. In July 2010 work began on the restoration and strengthening of the guildhall clock tower and, in 2014, the Norwich Heritage Economic and Regeneration Trust took a 25-year lease on the building with a view to making it more accessible to the public.

== See also ==
- Guilds in England
