= Edward Rede =

16th-century English politician

Edward Rede (by 1476 – 26 October 1544), of Norwich, Norfolk, was an English businessman and politician.

He was the third son of John Rede and his wife Joan Ludlow. He was a mercer and was admitted as Freeman of Norwich at the age of 21 in 1597, during his father's mayoralty at Norwich

He was a member of parliament (MP) for Norwich in 1529 and mayor of the city in 1521–22, 1531–32 and 1543–44.
