= Augustine Steward =

16th-century English politician

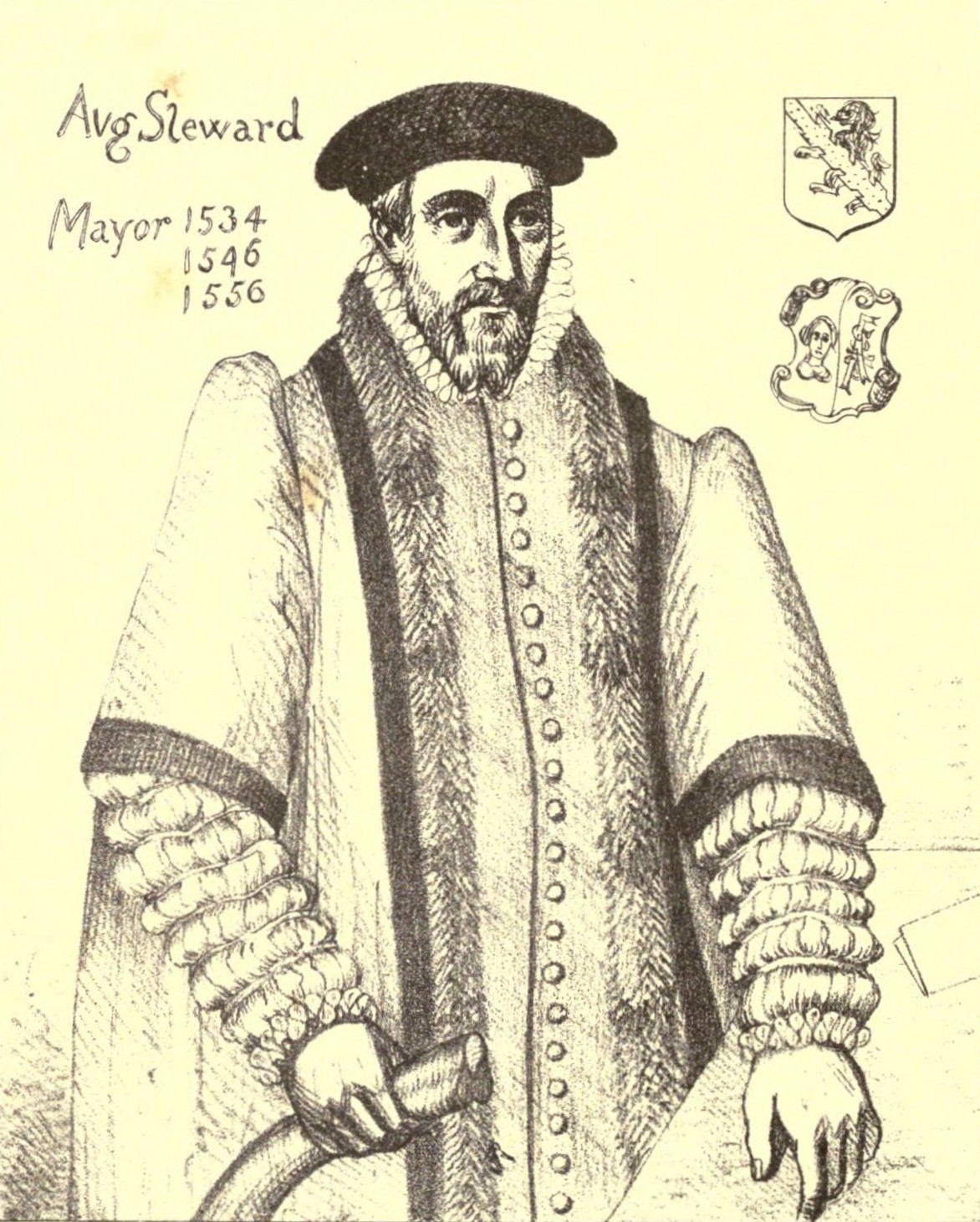
Augustine Steward (engraving of the painting in St. Andrew's Hall, Norwich)

Augustine Steward (1491 – 1571), of Norwich, Norfolk, was an English politician.

== Career ==
Steward was a mercer and an armiger. He was admitted a freeman of the city of Norwich on 12 March 1516 and after serving for some years on the common council was elected an alderman in 1526, a position he was to retain until his death. He became the government’s leading supporter in Norwich, and his "good services" to the king earned him the praise of the Duke of Norfolk and of Roger Townshend who commended him to Thomas Cromwell. Steward’s standing with these magnates made him a valuable agent in the city’s efforts to benefit from the Reformation.

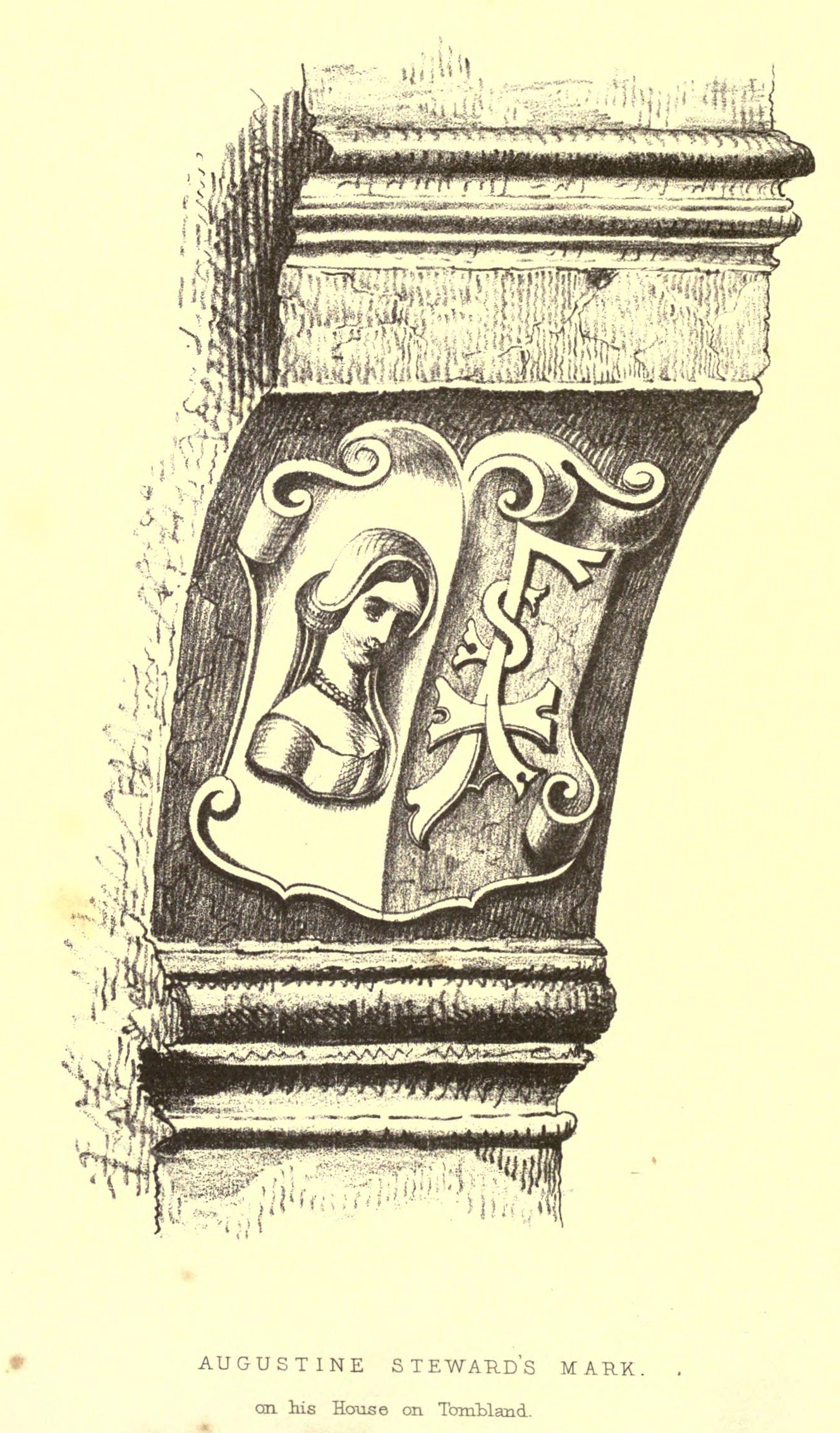
Augustine Steward's mark on his house on Tombland

Steward was mayor of Norwich in 1534-35, 1546–47 and 1556-57. It was during his first mayoralty that negotiations were begun between the corporation and the cathedral authorities for a revision of Wolsey’s settlement of a longstanding dispute between them. Steward continued to pursue the matter, approaching Cromwell in May 1537 for his favour and later asking the minister to reverse Wolsey’s judgment placing the cathedral outside the city’s jurisdiction. Early in 1539 he was one of the attorneys appointed to argue the case before the king, and on 6 April Letters Patent were granted in the city’s favour. In the meantime he had also become the moving spirit in the attempt to anticipate the dissolution of the house of the Black Friars by acquiring it for the city. In 1538 he and his kinsman Edward Rede, after consultation with the Duke, asked Cromwell for his assistance to this end, and when the house was suppressed it was granted to the city on 1 June 1540, Steward himself paying the £81 required.

During Kett's rebellion Steward was made acting mayor after the insurgents had taken the mayor prisoner. As one of the richest citizens he had much at stake and it must have been with relief that on the Marquess of Northampton’s arrival he presented the city’s sword and entertained the marquess to dinner. But Northampton quickly withdrew, and when the rebels entered Norwich they forced their way into his house, "took him, plucked his gown beside his back, called him a traitor and threatened to kill him", and then ransacked the house. On the approach of the Earl of Warwick the rebels sent Steward and Robert Rugge to negotiate on their behalf, but on being taken to Warwick the two revealed to him how his troops could retake the city. Despite his harrowing experience and a rebuke from Warwick for pusillanimity, Steward retained his standing in Norwich and was regularly in office for a further fifteen years. He attended his last meeting of the Norwich assembly early in 1571, but he was replaced as one of the aldermen in April of that year.

Steward was a Member of Parliament (MP) for Norwich in 1539 and 1547.

Little has come to light about the commercial activity which yielded Steward his considerable wealth, but there is a reference to a venture of about 1530 in which, with his father-in-law Reginald Lytilprowe and others, he had a factor at Danzig to freight a ship to a value of 800 marks for a voyage to Great Yarmouth. Part of his profits went into Norfolk land: in 1530 he bought the manor of Welborne, and in 1548 the manor of Barton Buryhall, which 12 years later he settled on his son-in-law Robert Wood.

== House ==
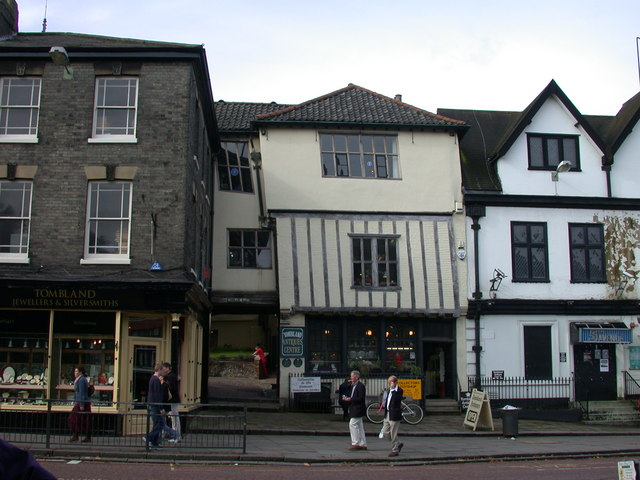

Steward lived in a house on Tombland, opposite Norwich Cathedral.

== Death ==
Steward died in 1571 and was buried with his two wives within St. Peter's Church, Hungate, Norwich. His will was proved in November.

== Family ==
Steward was born and baptised in the parish of St. George’s Tombland, Norwich, the son of Jeffrey Steward (d.1504), an Alderman of Norwich and his wife Cecily, daughter of Augustine Boys, an armiger.

Steward married twice:

- (1) before 1548, Alice, daughter of Henry Repps, Esq., of Heveningham. They had a son and two daughters: Edward, Faythe, and Elizabeth.
- (2) Elizabeth, daughter of William Rede, Esq., of Beccles Manor, Suffolk (he died 1552), they had six daughters and two sons: William, Thomas, Elizabeth, Cycelle, Anne, Barbara, and Katherine.
