= William Rugge (bishop) =

English bishop

The Right Reverend William Rugge
- Bishop of Norwich
- Church: Church of England
- Diocese: Diocese of Norwich
- Term ended: 1549 (resignation)
- Predecessor: Richard Nykke
- Successor: Thomas Thirlby
- Other post: Abbot of St Benet's Abbey (1530–1539)

Orders
- Consecration: c. 1536

Personal details
- Born: Northrepps, Norfolk
- Died: 1550
- Denomination: Catholic (Anglican)
- Education: Gonville Hall, Cambridge

William Rugge (also Rugg, Repps, Reppes; died 1550) was an English Benedictine theologian, and bishop of Norwich from 1536 to 1549.

== Life ==
He was born in Northrepps, Norfolk.

He was a Doctor of Divinity of Gonville Hall, Cambridge in 1513. The Carthusian Thomas Spencer (died 1529) wrote A Trialogus between Thomas Bilney, Hugh Latimer and William Repps, in which Rugge appears to balance two reformers.

He became Abbot of St Benet's Abbey in 1530. He retained the abbey in commendam on being appointed bishop of Norwich; the community there was suppressed in 1539.

He was one of the authors of The Bishops' Book of 1537. A theological conservative, he was one of the group trying, without success, to have the Book include material defending pilgrimages. He disputed publicly with Robert Watson, an early evangelical Protestant, in 1539, on the topic of free will.

== Resignation ==
He resigned his diocese in 1549. Reasons given are financial problems, and royal anger at his sloth in opposing Kett's Rebellion (which may have amounted to sympathy). Gilbert Burnet claimed that the see was needed as place to move Thomas Thirlby, bishop of Westminster, so that Nicholas Ridley could be translated from Rochester, to become bishop of London. Rugge had in fact long been a thorn in Thomas Cranmer's flesh, and after Kett was put down he was eased out in disgrace, but pardoned and pensioned off.

== Notes ==
Church of England titles
| Preceded by Richard Nykke | Bishop of Norwich; 1536–1549 | Succeeded by Thomas Thirlby |
