= Robert Rugge =

16th-century English politician

Robert Rugge (by 1503 – 18 February 1558/9), of Norwich, Norfolk, was an English politician.

== Life ==
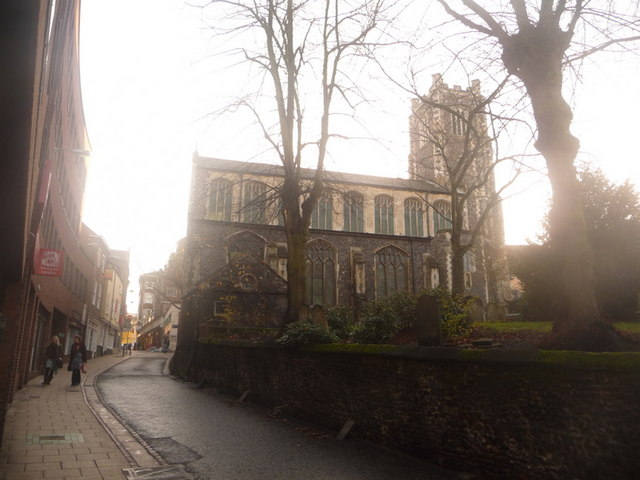
St. John the Baptist's Church in Madder-Market, Norwich

Robert Rugge was the son of William Rugge, of Northrepps, and Agnes. His older brother was William Rugge, Bishop of Norwich. He obtained properties from his brother, the Bishop. William Rugge, abbot of St. Bennet's, conveyed the manor of Greengate to Robert Rugge, his brother, and alderman of Norwich in 1533. William sold him Ashmanagh in Hoveton. The family owned the property there until at least 1618.

Rugge was sheriff in 1537-1538. He was a Member of Parliament (MP) for Norwich in 1545. He served as mayor of Norwich in 1545-1546 and 1550-1551.

Rugge married twice. His first wife was Elizabeth, daughter of Robert Wood of Norwich. They had five sons and three daughters. His second wife was Alice, daughter of William Wayte of Tittleshall, and widow of William Hare of Beeston.

Rugge died on 18 February 1559. He was buried in St. John's Church in Norwich.
