= Sheriff of Norwich =

The office of Sheriff of Norwich is a ceremonial role in the city of Norwich, Norfolk, England.

Originally created by a charter of Henry IV in 1404 making the city into a county corporate, it is now continued as an 'office of dignity' under the terms of the Local Government Act 1972, with the sheriff being appointed by Norwich City Council annually.
