= Horsham St Faith and Newton St Faith =

Civil parish in Norfolk, England

Coordinates: 52.6872°N 1.2782°E

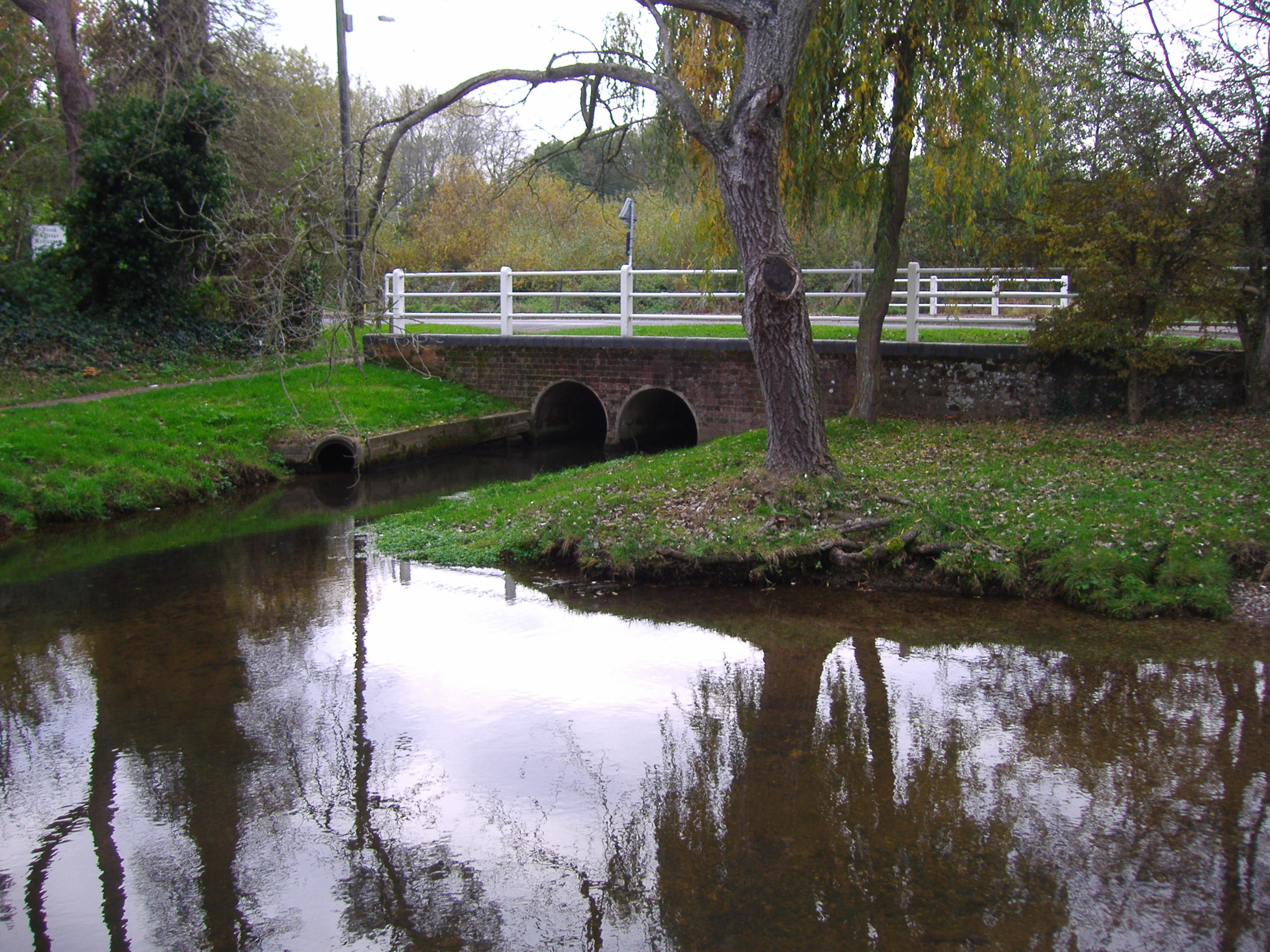
- The ford on the River Hor in the village

- Location within Norfolk
- Area: 7.33 km^{2} (2.83 sq mi)
- Population: 1,724 (2011)
  - Density: 235/km^{2} (610/sq mi)
- OS grid reference: TG216149
- Civil parish: Horsham St Faith and Newton St Faith
- District: Broadland
- Shire county: Norfolk
- Region: East
- Country: England
- Sovereign state: United Kingdom
- Post town: NORWICH
- Postcode district: NR10
- Police: Norfolk
- Fire: Norfolk
- Ambulance: East of England

Horsham St Faith and Newton St Faith is a civil parish in the English county of Norfolk, consisting of the former parishes of Horsham St Faith and Newton St Faith. Collectively they are known as St Faiths. It covers an area of 7.33 km^{2} (2.83 sq mi) and had a population of 1,624 in 770 households at the 2001 census, increasing to a population of 1,724 in 797 households at the 2011 Census. For the purposes of local government, it falls within the district of Broadland.

== Horsham St Faith ==
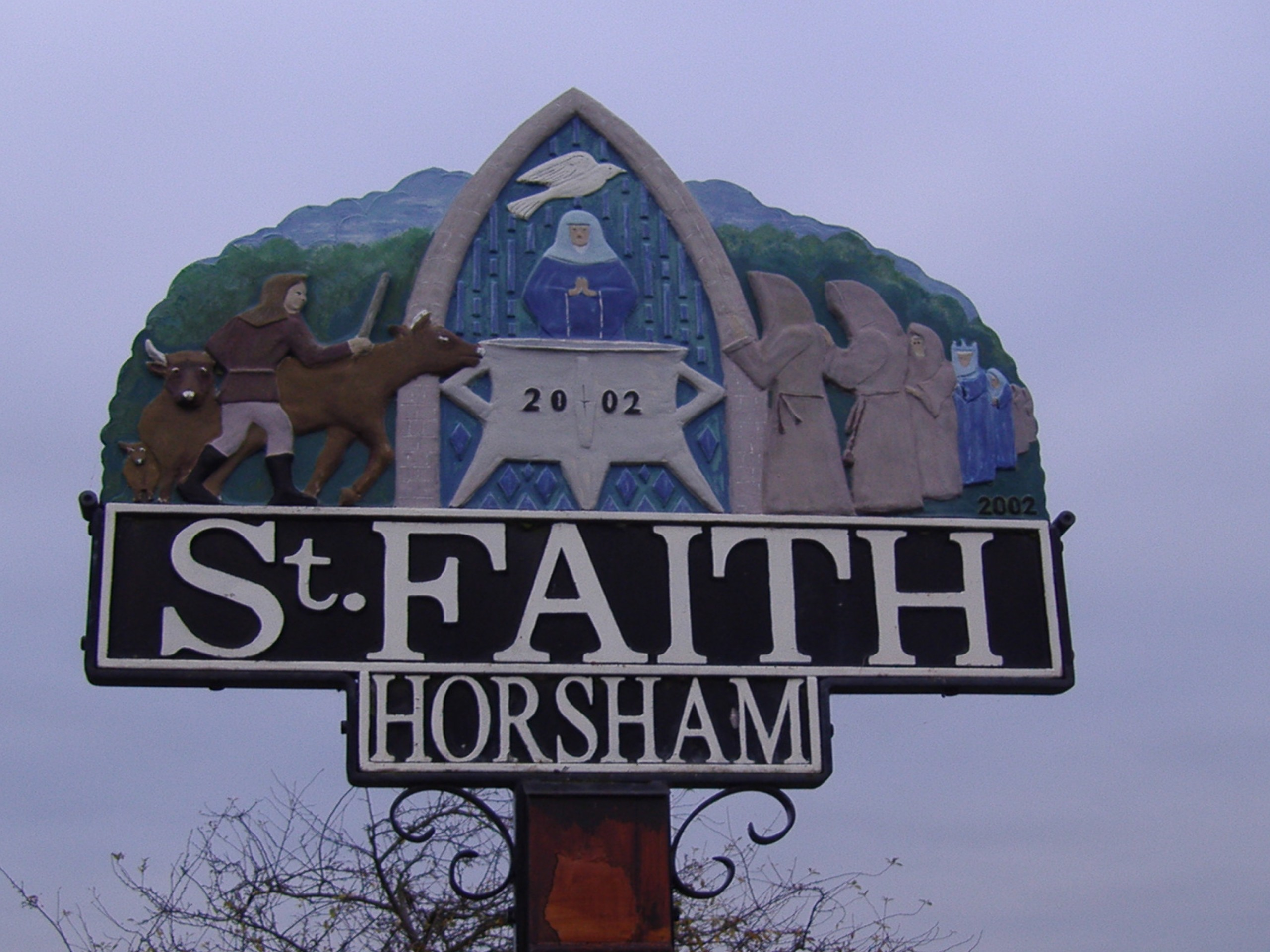
The village sign

The village takes its name from the River Hor, which flows through the parish on its course from Horsford to Horstead; and a Benedictine priory, founded in honour of St. Faith that, until the dissolution of the monasteries, stood there.

Norwich International Airport, which was first developed in 1939 as RAF Horsham St. Faith is close by. The village is also home to the City of Norwich Aviation Museum.

The remains of a motte and bailey castle, Horsford Castle, on the Horsford side of the A140, can be reached by following a track to the north of Church Street, which joins Horsford and Horsham St Faith.

In the early 12th century Henry I issued the lord of the manor with permission to hold a fair, which became known as St Faith's Fair. It became one of the largest cattle fairs in the country. Cattle from Scotland would be brought to the fair before eventually being sold in London at Smithfield market. The fair closed in 1830, with cattle continuing to be sold in the area until 1873.

== The Church of St Mary and St Andrew ==
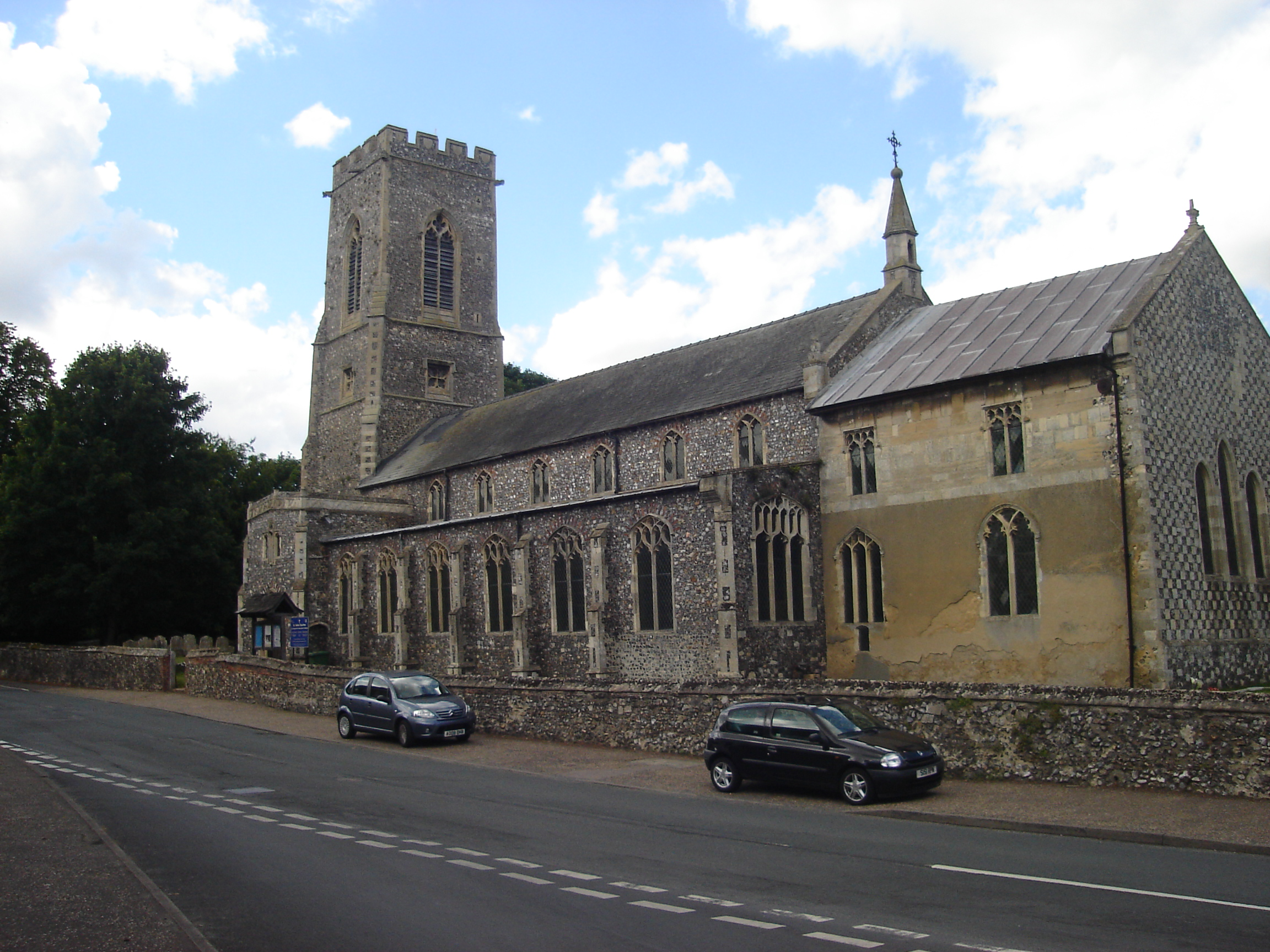
The church of St Mary and St Andrew

The church mainly dates to the 15th century, although the west tower is believed to have been built in the early 14th century, with the oldest part of the church being the east wall, which dates to the early 13th century. The church is grade I listed. Of interest inside the church is the rood screen, dated 1528 and adorned with 12 panels depicting saints and the elaborate Jacobean font cover.

== Amenities ==
Amenities in the locality include a community centre, primary school, doctor's surgery, two post offices, one serving each village, restaurant, and a small industrial estate. The village had two public houses; the Kings Head and the Black Swan. The former ceased trading in 2009.

== Crematorium ==
Located in Manor Road, the St Faith, or Norwich and Norfolk crematorium, was established in 1937. Prior to this, the site was occupied by a Poor Law Union workhouse which was destroyed by fire in 1923. The large chapel by J P Chaplin was completed in 1936 and finished in red and mauve brick. The Commonwealth War Graves Commission placed a memorial plaque in the chapel listing 30 British service personnel who were cremated here in World War II. Notable people cremated here include two Victoria Cross recipients:

- Lieutenant-Colonel Victor Buller Turner (1900–1972), whose ashes were later buried at Ditchingham.
- Sergeant William Burman (1897–1974), whose ashes were later taken to Golders Green Crematorium.

== Notable residents ==
- St. Robert Southwell - Jesuit priest, poet and martyr.

== Newton St Faith ==
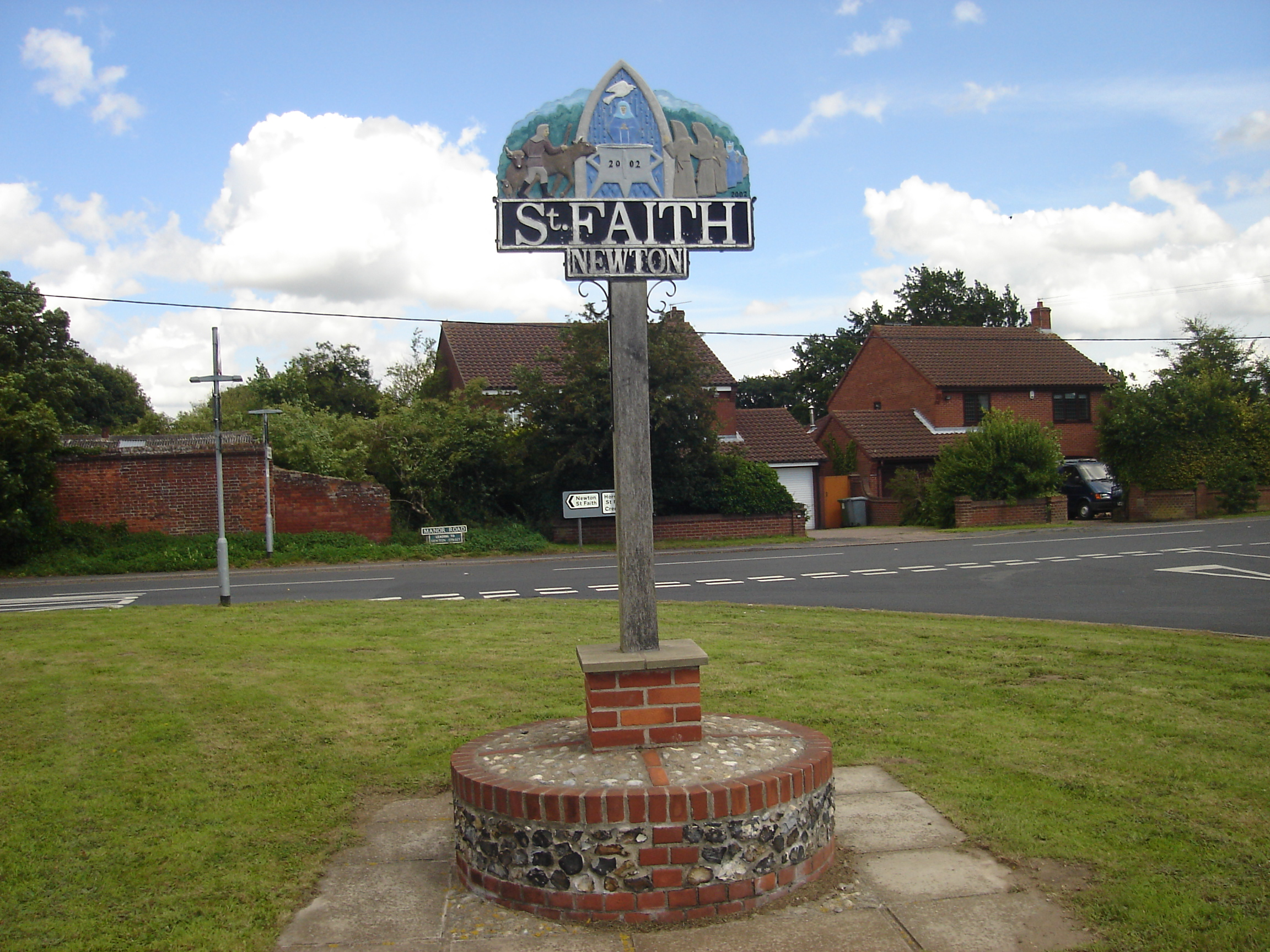
The Newton St Faith village sign

The village of Newton St Faith lies approximately 1 mile (1.6 km) north of Horsham St Faith. Much of the parish is given over to agriculture. Residential development is concentrated along Newton Street. Approval for new homes to be built in the village was granted in 2025.

== Public transport ==
Bus

Services through and close to the villages are provided by Sanders connecting the parish to surrounding towns, villages and further afield, including Aylsham, Cromer and Sheringham (Sanders routes 43 and 44A).

== Gallery ==
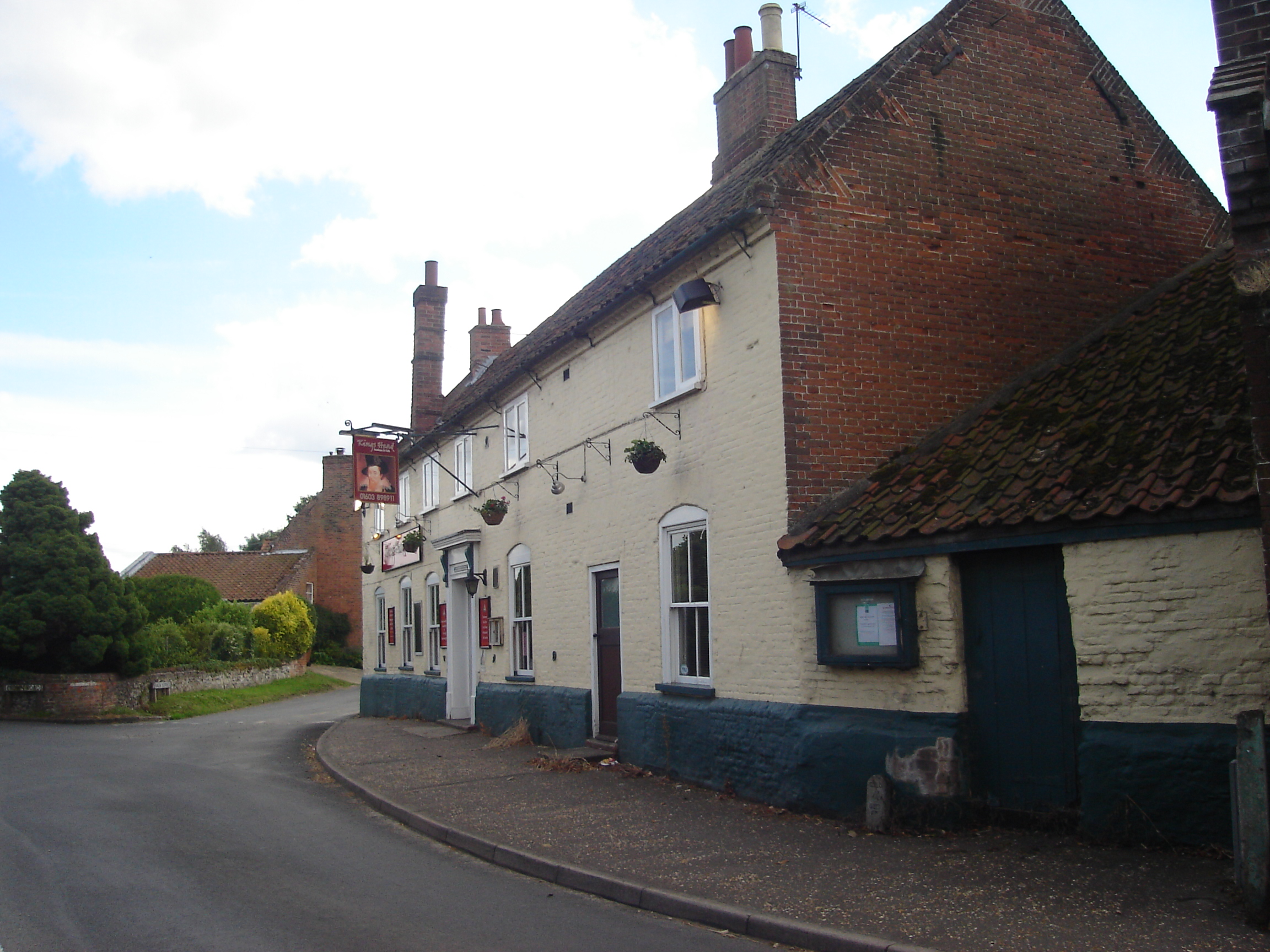
The Kings Head public house (Closed 2009)

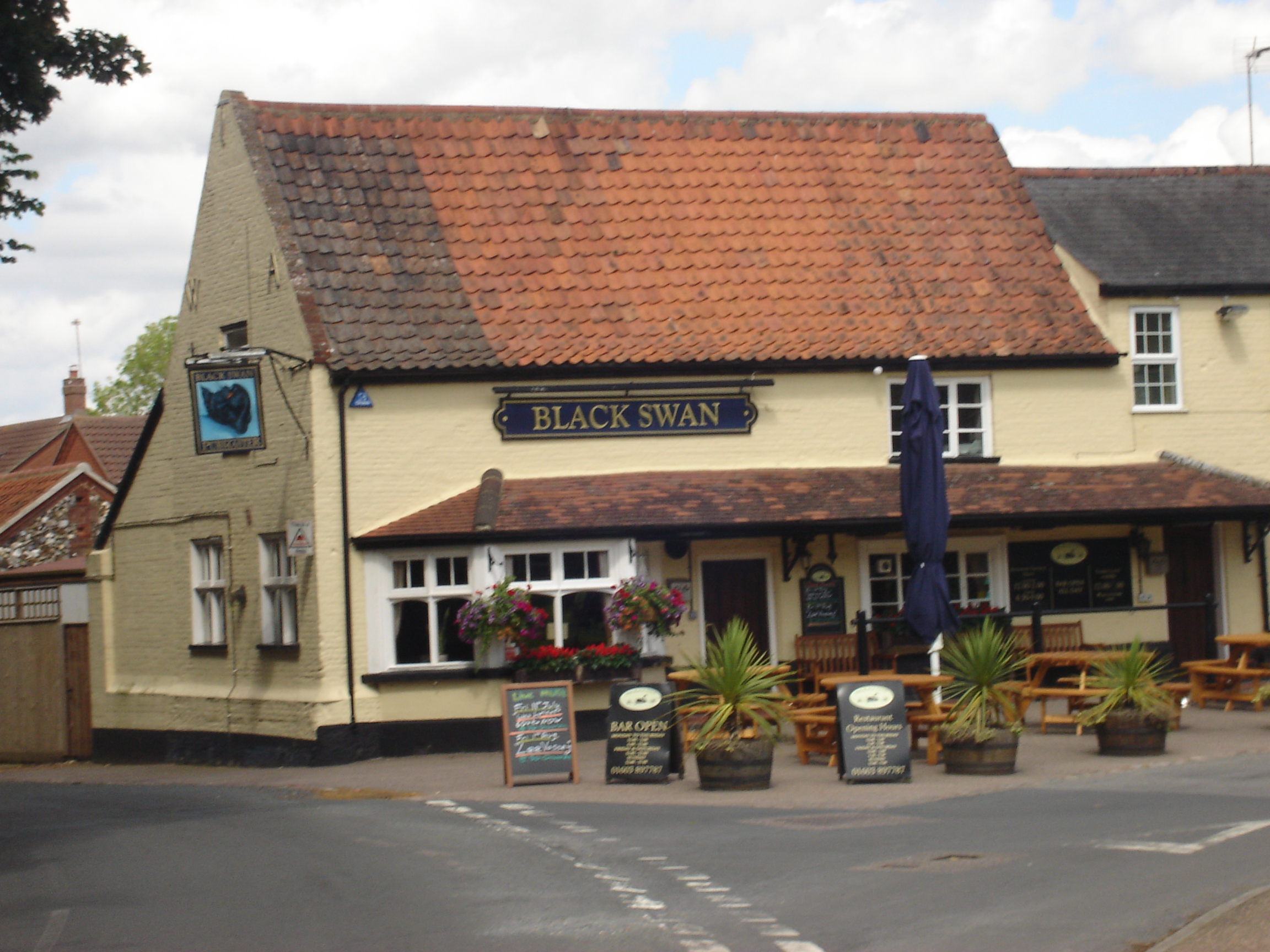
The Black Swan public house

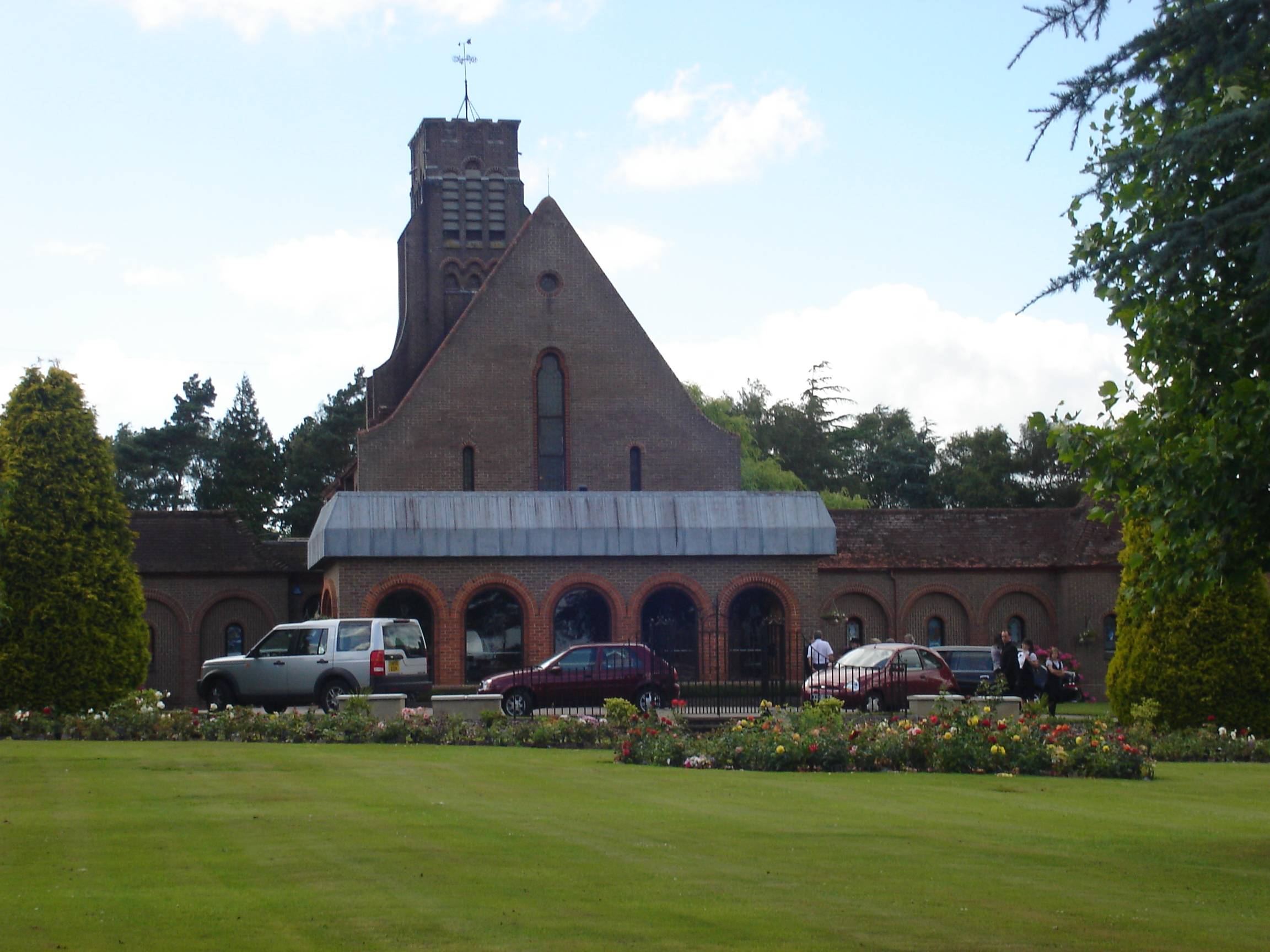
The chapel at St Faith crematorium

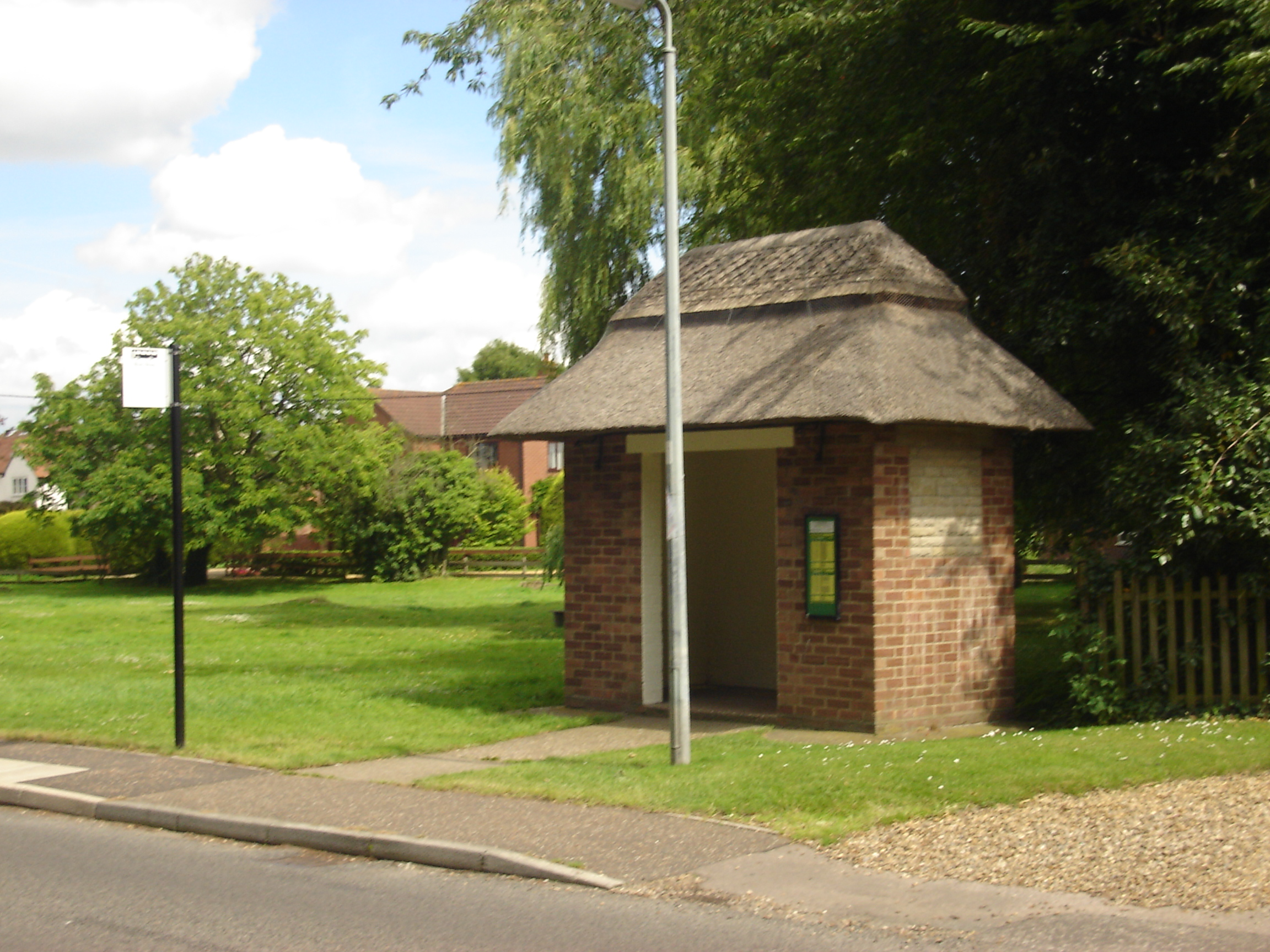
The thatched roof bus shelter
