= Alderman Norman's Foundation =

Charitable foundation in Norwich

Alderman Norman's Foundation is an educational charity based in Norwich, Norfolk in the United Kingdom. The Educational Foundation of Alderman John Norman is a registered charity under English law, with charity number 313105. The Foundation was created by the terms of the will of John Norman, a businessman who was Mayor of Norwich in 1714–15. The Foundation's objectives are the education of children who are descendants of Alderman John Norman and children / young people residing in the Parish of Old Catton, and educational organisations in the Parish of Old Catton, the City of Norwich and its immediate suburbs.

== The Will ==
Norman wrote his will in 1720, with a codicil in 1723. The will is long (10,000 words) and complicated. The provisions are so elaborate and far-reaching that they have never been able to be implemented in full. The primary purpose of the will was to provide for the education of the sons of his family members and those of his first wife, Ann Mace. It did so by providing that every two years a boy should be helped with his education or apprenticeship until, after 60 years, there would be 30 boys, being a sufficient number for a boarding school to be built. Very precise details were given as to what the boys should wear, and eat.

On the Wednesday morning for his breakfast, meat broth with oatmeal and bread sufficient; for dinner, peas-porridge or fish, if reasonable, or peas and beans, if in season, with butter sufficient; and at night, bread and cheese, or bread and butter.

There was a weekly allowance of each item, such as "eight quarts of beer, the beer to be brewed with five pecks of malt to the barrel; and four ounces of hops to each barrel; and the malt to be reckoned at ten shillings per combe, and no more". There was never sufficient in the estate for a boarding school to be opened, but a day school did eventually open in 1839, in Cowgate in Norwich, rather than the intended Old Catton (referred to as Catton in the will). The school ran for almost 100 years, until the retirement of the last headmaster, John William Howes, in 1934.

Those entitled to benefit from the educational trust in the Will were the sons of the descendants of Thomas Norman, cousin of the Alderman's father; Thomas Mace, father of Ann Mace; John Lindley, uncle of the Alderman; George Lindley, uncle of the Alderman; Ann Whitlock (née Norman), cousin of the Alderman; Elizabeth Moore (née Norman), cousin of the Alderman; Esther Cobb (née Bradford), step-aunt of the Alderman; Dr Bradford, step-uncle of the Alderman; Roger Mace, uncle of Ann Mace; and Susan Laws (née Dawes), cousin of Ann Mace. The will provided that if there were insufficient boys from these descendants, then unrelated boys from Catton or the local wards in Norwich could be educated instead. One boy in every 15 was to be chosen as a sizar and to be educated at the University of Cambridge. This element of the will was almost wholly unsuccessful: it is said that only one boy ever so proceeded to Cambridge, in 1742, and that he ended his days in a mental institution.

== The Alderman Norman Endowed School ==
It was not until 1733 that the trustees began to accumulate the assets for the school. Between 1743 and 1754 a considerable sum was placed out at interest. Upon the death of the Treasurer, Nockold Tompson, in 1777, it was found that, of the sums owed to the charity, £890 18s 10d was irretrievably lost, and only £150 was recovered from Tompson's executors. Meanwhile, boys were being funded for their education elsewhere. By 1832 there were 37 such boys. However, by 1827 more was being spent on the trustees' annual dinners than on education of the boys.

Following this debacle, and the formalising of the interests of the descendants through the creation of the Claimants' Unity, the school finally opened in 1839, although in Norwich rather than the intended Catton, and not according to the very precise construction details set out in the will. The formal opening of the school took place in March 1840, with the claimants and their children marching in procession from Chapel Field to the bowling green of the New Inn, St Augustine's Gates, where the boys were fed buns. A party of 500 was entertained in the school-room, where the leader of the claimants, Samuel Daynes, proposed 'The Memory of Alderman Norman'. In 1869 there were still 30 boys. The trustees battled successfully with the Charity Commissioners in the late 1880s, who had wished to remove the focus on the descendants as a class of beneficiaries. The school continued until 1934 when, prompted by the retirement of the last headmaster, it closed. A Scheme the following year provided for the closure of the school (subsequently demolished in the 1960s), an award of a pension to the last headmaster (who did not die until 1951, aged 90), and the replacement of the school with grants to the descendants, and also with grants to boys in Catton and Norwich. A further Scheme of 1972 extended the benefit of the charity to girls as well as boys. The 1972 Scheme was amended in 1973 to provide for grants for leisure activities for young people.

== Alderman Norman's Claimants' Unity ==
The mismanagement of the charity's accounts and finances in the first 100 years led to the establishment, in 1839, by a number of the descendants of a Claimants' Unity, to protect their interests. In the late 1890s the Claimants secured the election of their secretary, Everett Howard, as a trustee. The existence of the Unity was formalised by the 1935 Scheme.

The Unity keeps a register of claimants and issues pedigrees showing descent, and, therefore, entitlement to awards. Under Alderman Norman's will, this was a role that had fallen to the Minister of St Peter Permountergate. The Unity hosts an annual service, at which Bibles are presented to children of descendants, and an annual carol service, both at St Margaret's, Old Catton.

== Other Charitable works ==
The will also made provision for payment of 10 shillings to the churchwardens of Catton each year, for payment of 6 shillings each to 20 poor people in the parish. This was governed by a separate charity, eventually becoming the Non-Educational Charity of Alderman John Norman, and which was brought to an end following a Scheme in 1993.

The Foundation has funded the building of two boats which have been named for Alderman Norman: the Alderman Norman I (1988) and the Alderman Norman II (2019). The 1988 boat is a timber-built 23 feet boat. The 2019 boat is also a timber-built 23'6" boat (boat no 1591Y). Both are modelled on a traditional Norfolk Broads reedlighter, a boat that carried the reed harvest. They have been made for educational use by the How Hill Trust, based at How Hill House at Ludham, on the Norfolk Broads.

Other recent funding has included to a Norwich primary school, a synchronised swimming club, a youth club in Old Catton, and a Norwich Scout Group.

== Chairmen ==
The earlier Chairmen were called Treasurers.

- William Rolfe (1724–54), a solicitor in Norwich
- Nockold Tompson (1754–77), Mayor 1759-60
- Robert Harvey (1777-1813), Mayor 1770-71 and 1800-01
- Robert Harvey (1813–20), Mayor 1787-88
- George Morse (1820–52)
- Frederick Elwin Watson (1868–93), Mayor 1866-67 and 1870-71
- The Ven Henry Nevill (1893–97), Archdeacon of Norfolk 1874-1900
- Sir George Morse (1897-1931), Mayor 1898-99 and Lord Mayor 1922-23
- Major Cyril Harry Walter, DL (1931–53)
- Joseph De Carle-Smith, MBE (1953–72)
- Charles Boardman Jewson (1972–81), Lord Mayor 1965-66
- The Rev Canon Wynter Blathwayt (1981–93), Rector of Horning 1966-85
- The Rev Jonathan Bertram Boston (1993-2021), Vicar of Horsford and Horsham St Faith 1969-93 and Priest-in-Charge of Litcham 1993-2020
- Steve Arber (since 2021)
