= Billingford =

Billingford may refer to:

- Billingford, Breckland, a village and civil parish near Dereham, in Norfolk, England
- Billingford, South Norfolk, a village in the parish of Scole, near Diss, in Norfolk, England
  - Billingford Windmill
- Richard de Billingford, chancellor of Cambridge University
