= Malthouse (disambiguation) =

A malthouse is a building used for the production of malt from cereal grain.

Malthouse may also refer to:

- Christi Malthouse (born 1976), Australian television personality
- Kit Malthouse (born 1966), English politician and businessman
- Mick Malthouse (born 1953), Australian rules football player and coach
- Samuel Malthouse (1857–1931), English cricketer
- William Malthouse (1890–1961), English cricketer

== See also ==
- Malthouse Broad
- Malthouse Theatre, Melbourne
- Malta House, the High Commission of Malta in the United Kingdom
- Malthous or Halphas, a demon
- Malthus
