= Scole Windmill =

Windmill in Scole, Norfolk, England

- Interactive map of Scole Windmill

Origin
- Mill name: Scole Windmill
- Mill location: Scole, Norfolk, United Kingdom
- Grid reference: TM 1522 7911
- Coordinates: 52°22′03″N 1°09′35″E
- Year built: 1799

Information
- Purpose: Corn mill
- Type: Tower mill
- Storeys: Four storeys
- No. of sails: Four
- Type of sails: Common sails or Spring sails, later Patent sails
- Winding: Fantail
- Fantail blades: Six
- No. of pairs of millstones: Two pairs

Scole Windmill is a truncated Grade II listed tower mill in Scole, Norfolk, United Kingdom that was built in 1799. It worked until 1883 and subsequently became a derelict shell. Later truncated, the stump was converted to residential use between 1984 and 1989.

== History ==
Scole Windmill was built in 1799. The mill may have had Common sails originally. Frederick Gissing was the miller in 1836. Samuel Barber was the miller from 1845 to 1864, having previously been at Jay's Green Mill, Harleston, Norfolk. The mill was offered for sale by auction in 1847. It was then in the occupation of Samuel Barber. The mill was offered for sale by auction in August 1864. It had Spring sails and a fantail by then and was still in the occupation of Samuel Barber. William Button was the miller in 1865 and the mill was offered to be let or sold in 1866. The mill was described as having new millstones. Frederick Simpson was the miller from 1868 to 1872. The mill was offered to let in 1872 and again in 1874, when it was taken by Edward Woodrow, who came from nearby Billingford Windmill. The mill had been fitted with Patent sails by this date. Edward Woodrow took St Helena Mill, Horsford, Norfolk in 1883 and Scole Windmill ceased working. The mill had lost its cap and sails by 1937, the tower remaining at full height. Arthur C. Smith surveyed the mill in 1971. He described the mill as a three storey shell. The mill was listed Grade II on 26 June 1981. The 30-foot (9.1 m) tall stump was converted to residential use between 1984 and 1989.

== Description ==
Scole Windmill was a four storey tower mill. The tower is 20 feet 0 inches (6.10 m) internal diameter at ground level, with walls 27 inches (690 mm) thick. The mill had a boat shaped cap. It was winded by a six-blade fantail. Originally four Common or Spring sails were carried, later replaced by double Patent sails which had eight bays of three shutters. The mill was winded by a six-blade fantail Two pairs of French Burr millstones were driven.
