= St Helena Mill, Horsford =

Windmill in Norfolk, England

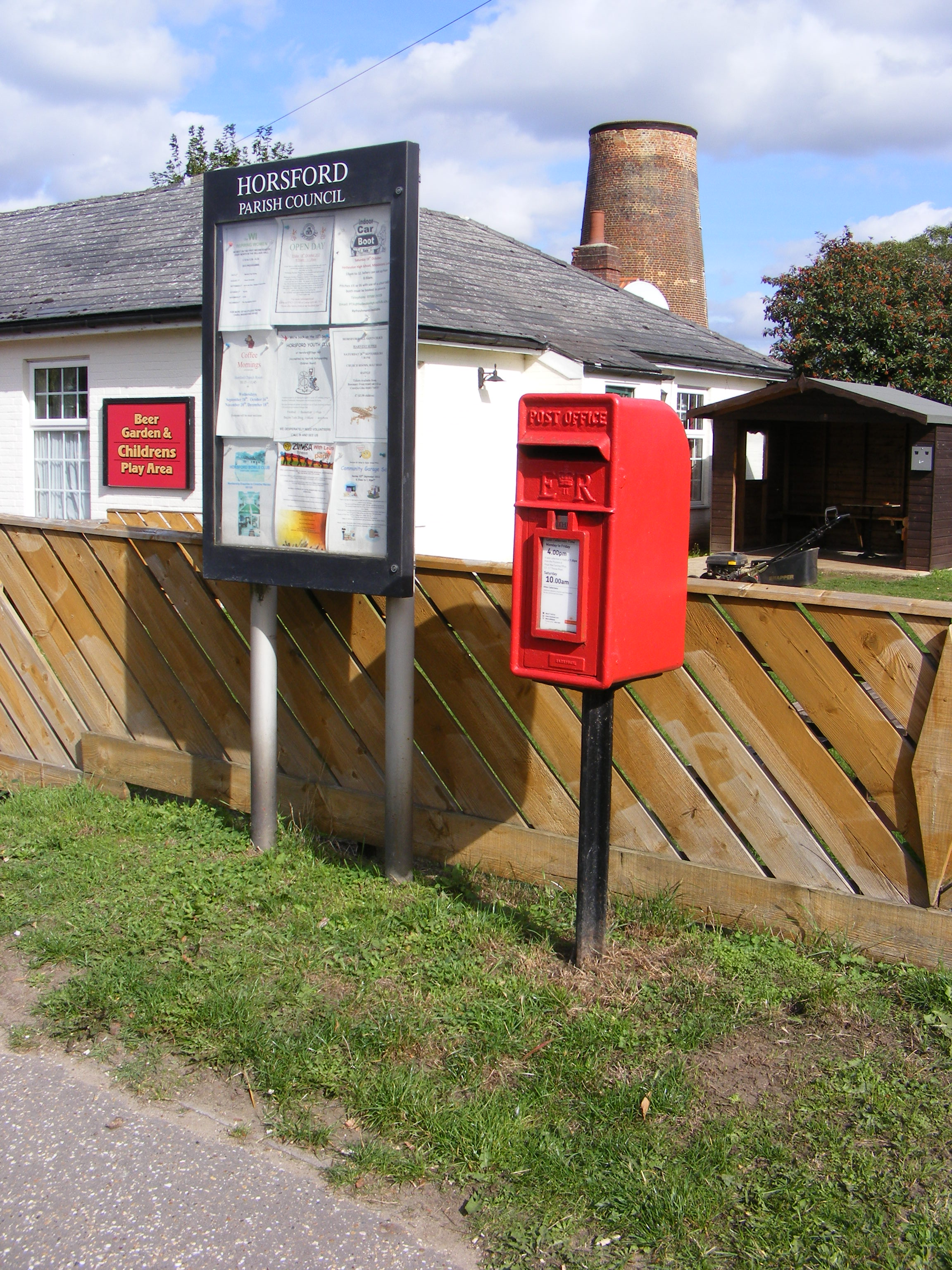
- St Helena Mill, September 2013
- Interactive map of St Helena Mill, Horsford

Origin
- Mill name: St Helena Mill
- Mill location: Horsford, Norfolk, United Kingdom
- Grid reference: TG 1903 1671
- Coordinates: 52°42′12″N 1°14′24″E
- Year built: 1860s

Information
- Purpose: Corn mill
- Type: Tower mill
- Storeys: Five storey tower
- No. of sails: Four
- Type of sails: Patent sails
- Windshaft: Cast iron
- Winding: Fantail
- Fantail blades: Six
- No. of pairs of millstones: Two pairs

St Helena Mill is a Grade II listed tower mill in Horsford, Norfolk, United Kingdom which was built in the mid-1860s. It worked by wind until 1920 and then became derelict. It was converted to residential use in the 2010s.

== History ==
The first mill on this site was a smock mill built in 1820. The first miller was Peter Pitcher. He was followed by Henry Warnes (1822–28), who had leased out his mill at Sea Palling. The mill was owned by Robert Marshall, who died in 1825. The mill was offered for sale by auction on 24 March 1825. It did not sell, and was not sold until January 1828 when August Adolphus Hamilton Beckwith bought it. Philip Blyth was the miller in 1836. Henry Buck was the occupier from 1840 to 1846 followed by William Lenny from 1850 to 1855. The mill was sold by auction on 19 September 1855 to Elijah Punt. Charles Punt was the miller from 1855 to 1868. Jeremiah Punt was also listed as the miller in 1864/65.

The smock mill was replaced by a tower mill between 1860 and 1865. The mill was sold in September 1868 to William Howe for £280. Hugh King was the occupier from 1872 to 1878. The mill was offered for sale by auction on 23 May 1874.. William Neve was the miller in 1879, followed by Robert Morley in 1883. The mill was sold in April 1889 to Edward Woodrow, the mill's tenant, who had previously been at Billingford and Scole windmills. The mill was conveyed to Hedley Woodrow in February 1920.

The mill had stopped working by 1922. In 1950, the mill stood with the cap frame and windshaft. A sign bearing the legend HOVIS adorned the mill. By 1933, the mill was derelict, with the sails, fantail and left side of the cap missing. The cap had gone by 1936, leaving the frame to support the windshaft. The mill was surveyed by Arthur C. Smith on 23 October 1970 and again on 21 May 1980. It was described as a derelict mill with the windshaft surviving. Some machinery and one pair of millstones survived. In August 1979, it was reported that Peter Dolman was considering buying the mill for restoration. (Note: Peter was part of the syndicate that bought and restored Thelnetham Windmill, Suffolk between 1979 and 1984.) The windshaft was removed on 13 September 1982.

The mill was listed as Grade II on 12 October 1984. In November 2005, the mill was sold and work began repairing the mill. In 2009, planning permission was granted to convert the mill to residential use, conserving the surviving machinery. A new cap was placed on the mill on 2 July 2015.

== Description ==
St Helena Mill is a five storey tower mill. The tower is around 36 feet 0 inches (10.97 m) tall. It had a boat shaped cap with a gallery. A cast iron windshaft carried four double Patent sails, which had seven bays of three shutters. It also carried a wooden brake wheel. The wooden upright shaft carried a cast iron great spur wheel. The mill was winded by a six bladed Fantail. Two pairs of millstones were driven underdrift. One of them were French Burr stones.
