= Nockold Tompson =

Mayor of Norwich

Nockold Tompson (26 October 1714 – 1777) was a brewer who was Mayor of Norwich in 1759–60.

Tompson was born in Norwich in 1714, the son of John Tompson, a brewer, and his wife Ruth. He was baptised on 21 November 1714 at St Michael Coslany, Norwich.

Tompson was Sheriff of Norwich in 1753-54 and Mayor of Norwich in 1759–60. Norwich Castle Museum holds a portrait of Tompson by John Theodore Heins Senior. He was an unsuccessful candidate for the two-member constituency of Norwich in 1761; Harbord Harbord and Edward Bacon were the successful candidates.

Tompson farmed at Earlham Hall (now the site of the University of East Anglia); his crop-yield experiments were praised by Arthur Young in his Farmer's Calendar of 1771.

He died in 1777, and was buried as a dissenter on 13 June that year in Norwich. From 1754 to 1777, Tompson had been the Treasurer of Alderman Norman's Foundation, established by the will of another Mayor of Norwich (1714–15), John Norman. On Tompson's death in 1777, it was found that of the sums owed to the charity, £890 18s 10d was irretrievably lost, and only £150 was recovered from Tompson's executors.
