= Horsham St Faith =

Village in Norfolk, England

Coordinates: 52.68721°N 1.27818°E

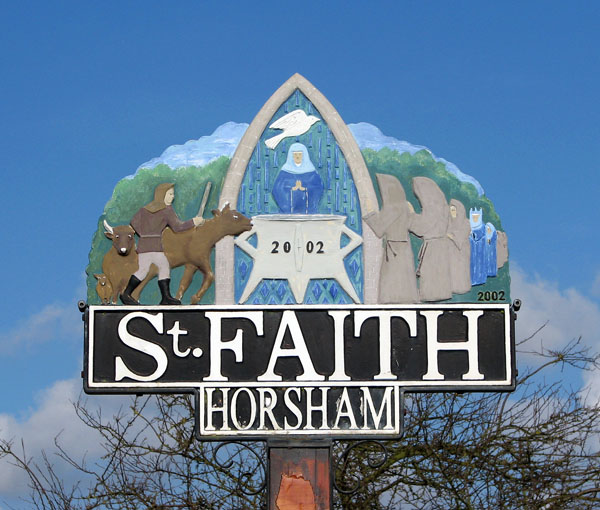
- Horsham St Faith Village Sign

- Location within Norfolk
- OS grid reference: TG216149
- Civil parish: Horsham St Faith and Newton St Faith
- District: Broadland
- Shire county: Norfolk
- Region: East
- Country: England
- Sovereign state: United Kingdom
- Post town: NORWICH
- Postcode district: NR10
- Dialling code: 01603
- UK Parliament: Broadland and Fakenham

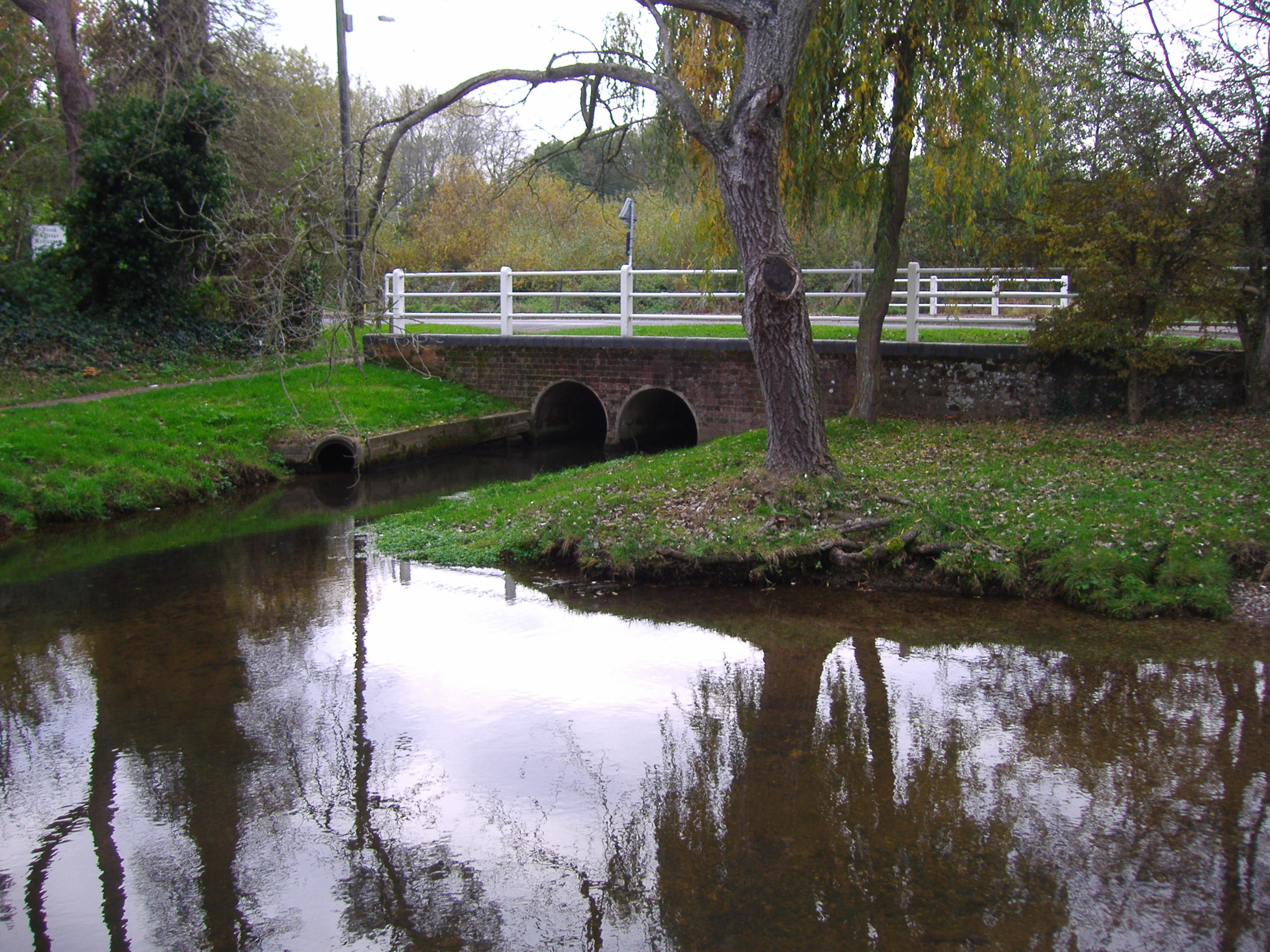
The ford on the River Hor in the village

Horsham St Faith is a village in the English county of Norfolk, within the civil parish of Horsham St Faith and Newton St Faith.

Horsham St Faith is located 8 miles (12.9 km) south of Aylsham and 5 miles (8.0 km) north of Norwich, along the course of the A140 and the River Hor.

== History ==
Horsham St Faith's name is of Anglo-Saxon origin and derives from the Old English for horse homestead with the honorific of Saint Faith added.

In the Domesday Book, Horsham St Faith is listed as a settlement of 16 households in the hundred of Taverham. In 1086, the village was part of the East Anglian estates of Robert Malet.

Horsham St Faith Priory was founded in the Benedictine Order in 1105 by Robert fitz Walter and his wife, Sybil. The monastery was dissolved in 1536.

RAF Horsham St Faith was built in 1939 and was primarily used by the Royal Air Force as well as the Eighth Air Force of the United States Army Air Forces. After the war, the airfield continued to be used by the Royal Air Force until it became Norwich Airport in 1968.

== Geography ==
The River Hor passes through the village as does the A140, between Needham Market and Cromer.

== Church of St Mary and St Andrew ==
Horsham St Faith's church is jointly dedicated to Saint Mary and Saint Andrew and dates from the 12th century. St Mary's & St Andrew's is on Church Street and has been Grade I listed since 1961. The church was restored in the Victorian era but still hosts a rood screen with painted images of saints below as well as a pre-Reformation pulpit.

== Notable residents ==
- Saint Robert Southwell (1561-1595), Jesuit and English martyr, born in Horsham St Faith.

== Governance ==
Horsham St Faith is part of the electoral ward of Spixworth with St Faiths for local elections and is part of the district of Broadland.

The village's parliamentary constituency is Broadland and Fakenham which has been represented by the Conservative Party's Jerome Mayhew MP since 2019.
