= John Norman (alderman) =

Mayor of Norwich and philanthropist

John Norman (usually known, since his death, as Alderman Norman) (1657 – 10 May 1724) was a businessman who was Mayor of Norwich in 1714–15. Norman is more notable, however, for his will, which left his considerable estate to the benefit of the descendants of his family members of those of his first wife, not by way of direct bequest but by the establishment of a trust. The trust is for educational purposes and, although much modified, still exists.

== Early life ==
Norman was born in 1657, to John and Ann Norman. His date of birth is unknown, but he was baptised on 20 April 1657 at St Giles' Church in Norwich. Little is known about his antecedents, other than that Norman's grandfather, Roger Norman, a silk weaver who was a Huguenot refugee, came to Norwich in the early 17th century.

== Career ==
Norman had a varied business career, variously being a worsted weaver, a farmer, a landowner, and a brewer. He was a churchwarden of St Peter Parmentergate, Norwich, Sheriff of Norwich in 1705-06 (not to be confused with High Sheriff of Norfolk) and Mayor of Norwich in 1714–15. It is very likely that he was present for the first ever recorded complete peal of church bells, which took place at St Peter Mancroft on 2 May 1715, during his term in office.

== Personal life ==
Norman married twice. His first marriage was at St Margaret's, Hempnall, on 25 December 1679, to Ann Mace. She died in 1714, during his term in office as Mayor. He married secondly at St Mary in the Marsh, on 16 March 1715, Katherine Brereton. There were no children of either marriage.

He died in 1724 in Bramerton, and is buried at St Margaret's, Old Catton, where he lived, and where a monument was erected in his memory in the church.

== Legacy ==
Norman left a will, written in 1720 and 1723, which made provision for an educational trust. The effective consequence of his will was to create the Foundation that exists in his name. The Foundation funds educational needs of descendants of Norman's family members and those of his first wife. It also provides funding for charitable works in the wider educational sphere. The former Alderman Norman's Endowed School, which finally opened in 1839 in Cowgate, closed in 1934.

Two boats have been built, and named for Norman: the Alderman Norman I (1988) and the Alderman Norman II (2019). Both were funded by the Foundation. The 1988 boat is a timber-built 23 feet boat. The 2019 boat is also a timber-built 23'6" boat (boat no 1591Y). Both are modelled on a traditional Norfolk Broads reedlighter, a boat that carried the reed harvest.

The Norman Centre at Mile Cross is named after him.
