= Sea Palling =

Village in Norfolk, England

Coordinates: 52.78°N 1.60°E

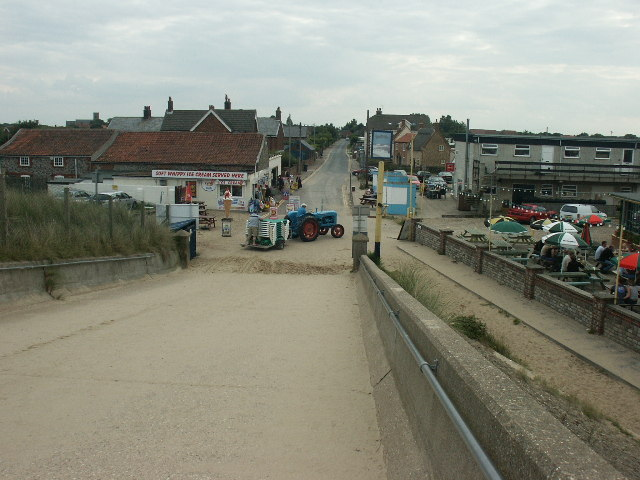
- Sea Palling Gap

- Location within Norfolk
- Area: 11.05 km^{2} (4.27 sq mi)
- Population: 655 (Including Horsey and Waxham, 2011 census)
  - Density: 59/km^{2} (150/sq mi)
- OS grid reference: TG420260
  - London: 140 miles (230 km)
- Civil parish: Sea Palling
- District: North Norfolk
- Shire county: Norfolk
- Region: East
- Country: England
- Sovereign state: United Kingdom
- Post town: NORWICH
- Postcode district: NR12
- Dialling code: 01692
- Police: Norfolk
- Fire: Norfolk
- Ambulance: East of England
- UK Parliament: North Norfolk

Sea Palling, also historically spelled Pawling and Pauling, is a village and civil parish covering 11.05 km^{2} (4.27 sq mi) in the English county of Norfolk. The village is 19.6 miles (31.5 km) south-east of Cromer, 19.6 miles (31.5 km) north-east of Norwich and 140 miles (230 km) north-east of London. The village lies 4 miles (6.4 km) east of the A149 between Kings Lynn and Great Yarmouth. The nearest railway station is at North Walsham for the Bittern Line, which runs between Sheringham, Cromer, and Norwich.

The parish was renamed on 2 October 1948 from Palling to 'Sea Palling'.

In local dialect the name is pronounced "Sea Pawling".

== History ==
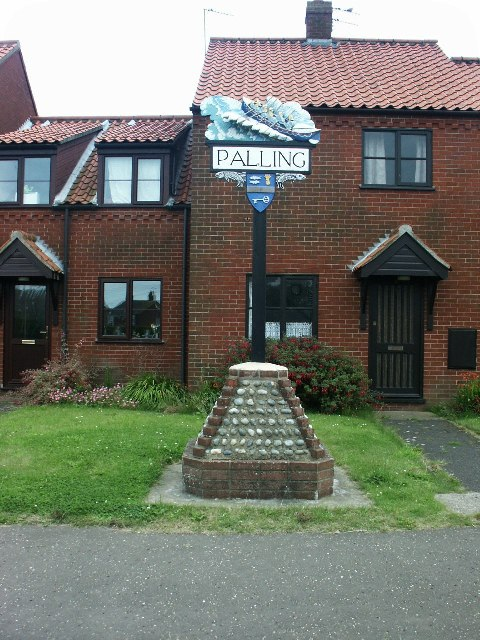
Village sign, carved by Henry Barnett and depicting a lifeboat with crew. It was refurbished in 2002.

The Domesday Book (1086) records that Palling consisted of nine villagers and fourteen smallholders. There were 20 acres (8.1 ha) of meadow, 14 wild mares, two cobs, 23 pigs and 71 sheep with a total value of £4.00. It was surrounded by areas of salt marsh.

The community's primary economy has been are linked to the sea since prehistory. Additional economic endeavours included agriculture and making bricks. Bricks were transported by wherry along the New Cut to various Broadland staithes. The brick industry ended around in the early 20th century, and the kilns were dismantled.

Coastal flooding has been an issue for Sea Palling since at least the medieval period. In the 13th century, the town of Waxham Parva disappeared into the sea during a storm. One of the earliest accounts was written by John of Oxendes, a monk at nearby St Benet's Abbey, in which he relates the destruction of the great storm of 1287:

In the dense darkness...the sea, agitated by the violence of the wind, burst through its accustomed limits, occupying towns, fields and other places adjacent to the coast. Issuing forth about the middle of the night it suffocated or drowned men and women sleeping in their beds, with infants in their cradles and all kinds of cattle and fresh water fishes; and it tore up houses from their foundations, with all they contained and carried them away, and threw them into the sea with irrevocable damage.

Several incursions occurred over the centuries. Two severe floodings occurred, one in neighboring Eccles on Sea that cause the loss 66 houses and more than 1,000 acres (4.0 km^{2}) of land, and a second in 1607 near Palling. These natural disasters led to the Act of Parliament known as the Sea Breach Act 1609 (7 Jas. 1. c. 20), enabling taxation on lowland properties to fund coastal defense work. Despite these efforts, Waxham flooded in 1655 and 1741.

In the 18th century, Sir Berney Brograve—who inherited the estates of Waxham, Sea Palling and Horsey in 1753—initially would not protect his estates by using his own funds. Instead, he attempted to revive the Sea Breach Act 1609 but was unsuccessful. In March 1792, an "Embankment Bill" was presented to Parliament, but was later withdrawn. In December of the same year, the lack of funding and proper maintenance of the sand dunes led to yet another breach, causing flooding and property damage. Eventually, an eight-mile stretch between Eccles and Winterton-on-Sea suffered from regular coastal flooding.

A “programme of sea defence” was eventually established in the 19th century.

Within the 20th century, the North Sea flood of 1953 took the lives of seven villagers—some of the 100 who perished in Norfolk alone. A memorial plaque was built in St Margaret's Church. Following this tragedy, the sea wall was extended in 1986. In 1995, the Environment Agency undertook a multimillion-pound project erecting four barrier reefs. Five more reefs were later added in 1998 to make them more effective.

Smuggling was an issue in the region that reached its peak in the mid-1770s. Revenue cutters patrolled the coast and Dragoons were often called on to assist. There were seizures of goods such as tea, tobacco, jenever and other spirits between 1772 and 1792. William Dutt recorded in his book The Norfolk and Suffolk Coast (1910) a local story that Palling was once the headquarters of armed smugglers. A coastguard service was established in 1822 and a station built at Palling, which contributed to a decline in smuggling.

As smuggling declined, marine salvage of shipwrecks became more common in the early 19th century. Nobility traditionally claimed or was given manorial rights over all wrecks that came ashore since the 13th century. In December 1948, a Norwegian steamer called the Bosphorous ran aground on the offshore Haisborough Sands, and its cargo of oranges was jettisoned. To a populace emerging from the strict rationing of the Second World War, the sight of crates of oranges on the beach seemed miraculous.

Despite nobility laying claim to shipwrecks, looting was common. A storm on 1779 New Year's Eve left 11 ships wrecked on Sir Berney's shore, which were quickly looted. Locally, scavengers of wrecks were known as "pawkers." Despite threats of prosecution for pawking, the practice continued with limited consequences. A famous incident occurred during the wreck of Lady Agatha in 1768; the cargo was valued at £50,000 (equivalent to £6,450,000 in 2019) and none of it was recovered by authorities.

Sea Palling Windmill was built in the 1810s. It worked by wind until about 1930 then became derelict. The empty tower has been converted to residential use.

== Sea Palling Lifeboat Station ==
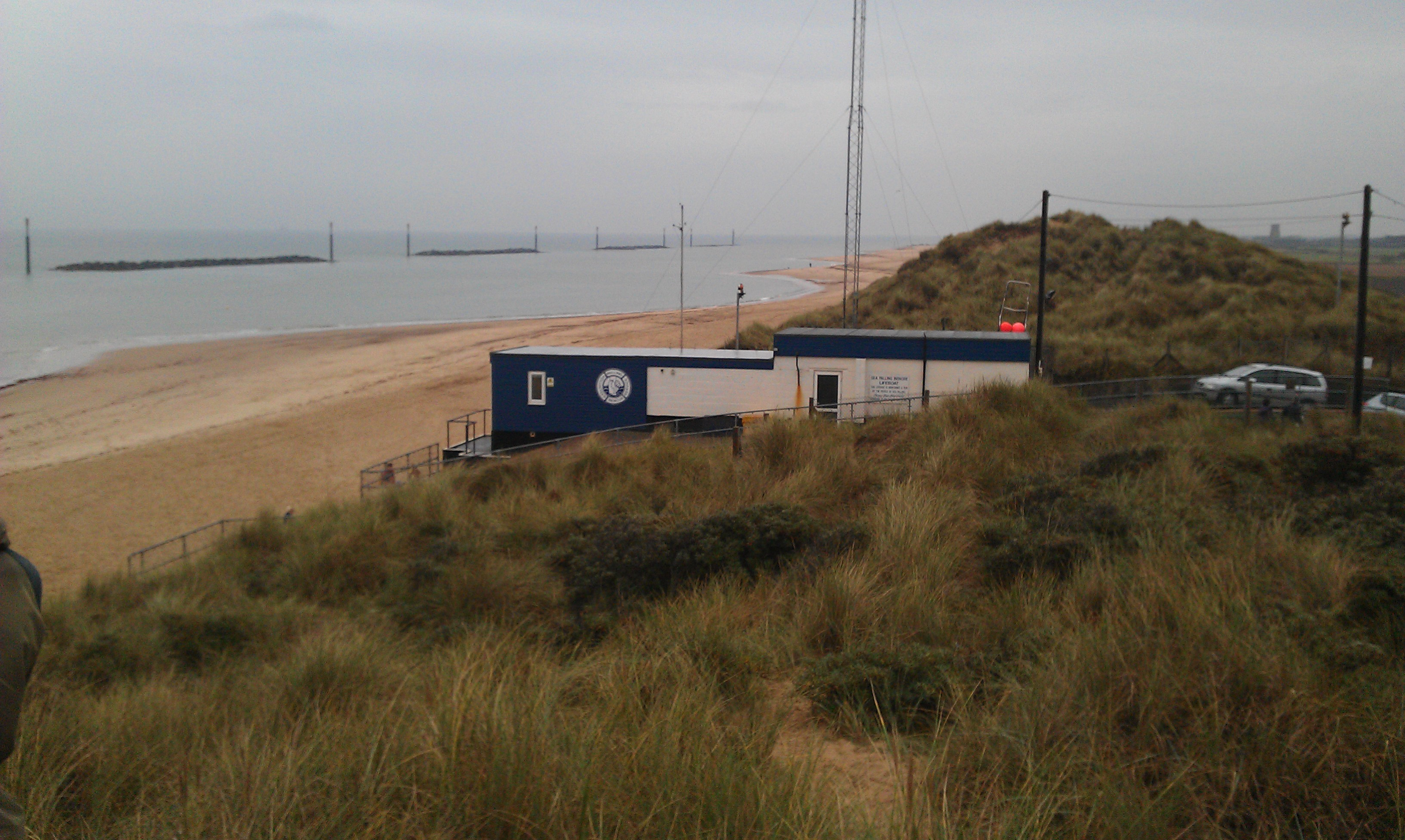
Sea Palling inshore lifeboat station

Sea Palling Lifeboat Station is a voluntary-staffed and charitable-funded lifeboat station located in the village. First established by private funds in 1840, it was taken over by the Royal National Lifeboat Institution (RNLI) in 1858 and operated until 1931, when it was closed in a rationalisation of regional lifeboat stations. During its 91 years of service, the station had one of the best rescue records of all the lifeboat stations in the UK. In 400 launches, 795 lives had been saved, a record bettered by only three other UK stations. Crews had gained four RNLI silver gallantry medals, with a replica of the one awarded to Tom Bishop still on show at St Margaret's Church.

Revived in 1974 by local people through private funds, business and charitable donations, today the charitable Palling Voluntary Rescue Service runs a single 5.7 metres (19 ft) Ocean Pro RIB, covering the area between Eccles-on-Sea and Winterton-on-Sea. Between mid-May and mid-September each year, the RNLI maintains a lifeguard station on the beach at Sea Palling, located just below the PVRS lifeboat station.
