= Charles Jewson (Lord Mayor) =

Businessman, antiquary and Lord Mayor of Norwich

Charles Boardman Jewson (23 October 1909 – 27 June 1981) was a businessman and antiquarian and a member of the Jewson family who was Lord Mayor of Norwich in 1965–66.

== Early life ==
Jewson was born in Norwich in October 1909, the son of Percy Jewson, Lord Mayor of Norwich 1934-35 and National Liberal MP for Great Yarmouth 1941–45, and Ethel Marion Jewson (née Boardman).

== Business career ==
Jewson qualified as an accountant, and joined the family firm of Jewson & Sons in 1934, retiring as a director in 1974.

== War service ==
At the start of WWII, Jewson was a special constable. In 1940 he joined the Equipment Branch of the Royal Air Force Reserve as an Acting Pilot Officer, becoming a Pilot Officer in the same year, Flying Officer (war subs) in 1941, Flight Lieutenant (temp) in 1942, and Flt Lt (war subs) in 1944. He retired in 1955 from the Royal Air Force Volunteer Reserve with the rank of Squadron Leader.

== Civic career and philanthropic interests ==
Jewson had a wide range of civic interests: so wide that none of the obituaries fully capture all of the details. He was elected to the Council of the Norfolk and Norwich Archaeological Society in 1959, President 1964–67, Chairman from 1965 and Vice-President from 1967. He was also President of the Norfolk Archaeological Trust, Chairman and Treasurer of the Norfolk Record Society and Chairman of the Norwich Survey from 1975. He was Chairman of the Alderman Norman's Foundation from 1972 to 1981. Jewson settled a charitable trust, the CB Jewson Charitable Trust (Charity Number 260086) in 1969, the objects of which were to assist elderly and young people and the disabled in Norfolk. The charity was wound up in 2008.

He was an active Baptist; the Jewsons have been described as the 'most important Baptist family in the city'. At the time of the 1939 register, Jewson and his wife had a furloughed missionary, Winifred Wenger, living with them. He was a deacon of St Mary's Baptist Church, Norwich (now called Norwich Central Baptist Church), and Secretary there for 25 years. He was Treasurer of the Baptist Missionary Society for ten years. His wife, who was the daughter of Gilbert Laws, the minister of St Mary's, was also a deacon, and President of the National Baptist Women's League in 1961.

He was a magistrate in Norwich from 1951 to 1979. When he was appointed Lord Mayor in 1965, he was the first to be appointed as a non-political nominee of the whole City Council.

== Published work ==
- Shrines of Christendom: The reflections of a pilgrim, (1946: Carey Kingsgate Press)
- The Norwich Lions, (1947: Goose & Son)
- A Short Review of the Timber Trade with Russia 1921-1939, (1948: Goose & Son)
- History of the Great Hospital, Norwich, (1949: Great Hospital)
- Transcript of three registers of passengers from Great Yarmouth to Holland and New England, 1637-1639, (1954: Norfolk Record Society)
- The People of Medieval Norwich, (1956: Jarrold & Sons)
- The Office of a Deacon, (1956: Carey Kingsgate Press)
- The Baptists in Norfolk, (1957: Carey Kingsgate Press)
- The Jacobin City: a portrait of Norwich in its reaction to the French Revolution, 1788-1802 (1975: Blackie)
- Simon Wilkin, (1979: Centre of East Anglian Studies)
- History of Doughty's Hospital, (1981)

== Personal life ==
Jewson married Joyce Marjorie Laws (1912–2008) in 1937. They had four children, one of whom is Sir Richard Jewson, Lord-Lieutenant of Norfolk, 2004–19. He died in 1981 aged 71 and is buried in the cemetery at Thorpe St Andrew. His address at death was Horsford Hall, Horsford. After his death, Horsford Hall was divided into four.

== Legacy ==
Two retirement complexes are named after him, in Norwich and in Bradwell.
