= Billingford, South Norfolk =

Village in Norfolk, England

Coordinates: 52.3630°N 1.180°E

Billingford
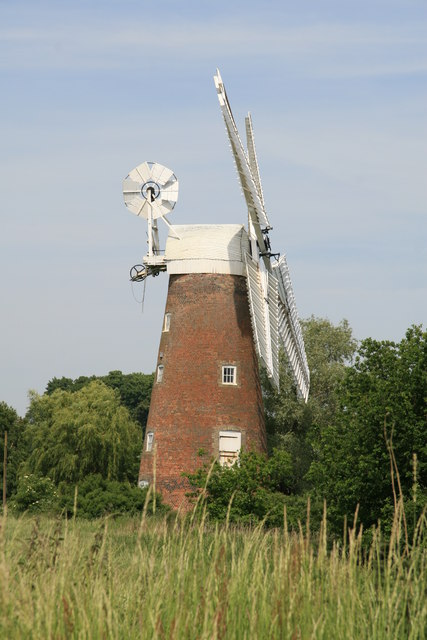
- Billingford Windmill

- Location within Norfolk
- OS grid reference: TM166786
- Civil parish: Scole
- District: South Norfolk
- Shire county: Norfolk
- Region: East
- Country: England
- Sovereign state: United Kingdom
- Post town: Diss
- Postcode district: IP21
- Dialling code: 01379
- Police: Norfolk
- Fire: Norfolk
- Ambulance: East of England
- UK Parliament: Waveney Valley

Billingford or Pirleston is a village in the civil parish of Scole, in the South Norfolk district of the county of Norfolk, England. It is 19.4 miles (31.2 km) south-west of Norwich and 2.9 miles (4.7 km) south-east of Diss.

== History ==
The origin of the name 'Billingford' is uncertain, although it is certainly of Anglo-Saxon origin. The village is listed in the Domesday Book of 1086 as consisting of 21 households in the hundred of Earsham. At the time, Billingford was divided between the estates of the Abbey of St. Etheldreda, Ely and Roger of Rames.

Within the village is Billingford Windmill, which dates from the 18th-century and is in working order. This structure is Grade II listed.

Lieutenant Gordon Flowerdew, who was born in the village, was a Canadian recipient of the Victoria Cross. Flowerdew was killed directing a cavalry charge of C Squadron of Lord Strathcona's Horse on the Western Front of the First World War on 31 March 1918.

== Geography ==
Billingford village is located on the A143 road from Great Yarmouth to Haverhill and is close to the banks of the River Waveney. Amenities within the village include a public house. In 1931, the parish had a population of 150. On 1 April 1935, Billingford parish was merged with Scole.

== Church ==
Billingford's parish church is dedicated to Saint Leonard and lays on a small hill to the north of the village. The church was constructed in early Sixteenth Century, with its construction being interrupted and changed during the English Reformation. The church contains a Medieval font and poppyhead with further additions to the church being made in the Seventeenth and Nineteenth Centuries.

== Governance ==
Billingford is part of the electoral ward of Beck Vale, Dickleburgh and Scole for local elections and is part of the district of South Norfolk. It is part of the Waveney Valley parliamentary constituency.
