= Sea Palling Windmill =

Windmill in Sea Palling, Norfolk, England

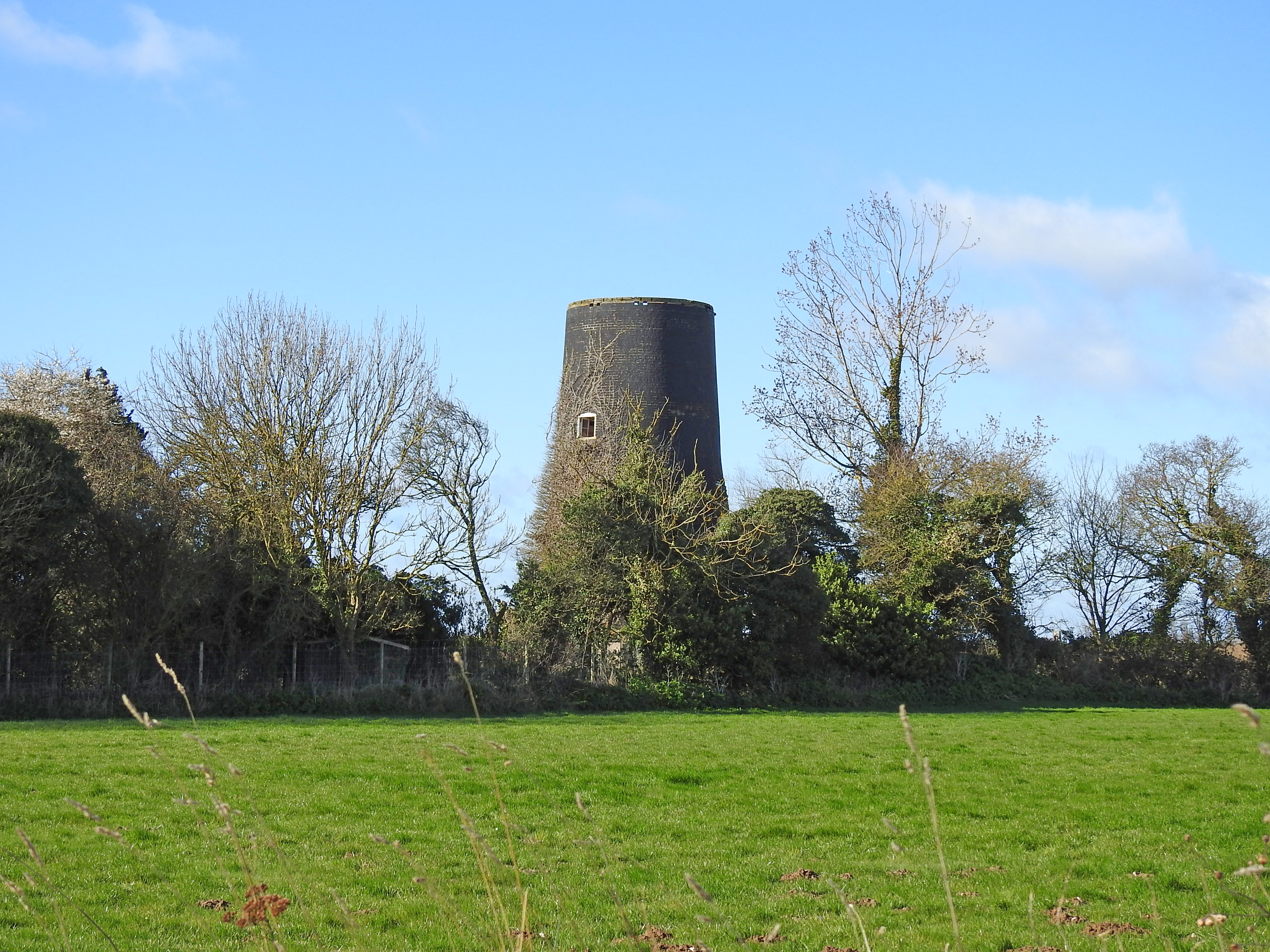
- Sea Palling Windmill, March 2019
- Interactive map of Sea Palling Windmill

Origin
- Mill name: Sea Palling Windmill
- Mill location: Sea Palling, Norfolk, United Kingdom
- Grid reference: TG 4152 2670
- Coordinates: 52°47′01″N 1°34′49″E
- Year built: 1810s

Information
- Purpose: Corn mill
- Type: Tower mill
- Storeys: Five storeys
- No. of sails: Four
- Type of sails: Patent sails
- Windshaft: Cast iron
- Winding: Fantail
- Fantail blades: Six
- No. of pairs of millstones: Two pairs

Sea Palling Windmill is a Grade II listed tower mill in Sea Palling, Norfolk, United Kingdom. Built in the 1810s, it worked until at least 1929 and was dismantled in the mid-1930s. The shell of the tower survives, converted to residential use.

== History ==
Sea Palling Windmill was built in the 1810s. It was advertised to be sold in December 1814. Henry Warns was the miller. He ran the mill until 1827 when it was let to John Gambling. Warns having moved to St Helena Mill, Horsford. James Searland was the miller in 1834, then Thomas Frary from 1835 to 1836, followed by Martin Palmer in 1838. The mill was offered for sale by auction in August 1842. It was not sold and Henry Warns returned to the mill, running it until 1858. His widow, Elizabeth, ran the mill from 1863 to 1868 with the assistance of a manager. Isaac Watson was the miller in 1872, then Henry Luson Warnes from 1878 to 1879, then Thomas Dawson Warnes from 1883 to 1889. The mill was offered for sale by auction in August 1889. Robert Everett was the miller in 1890, followed by Robert Morley from 1829 to 1925 and Stephen Dan Riches in 1929.

The mill ceased working c.1930. It retained its cap, but had lost its sails and fantail by 1937. A photograph shows that the cap had been removed by September 1938. Arthur C. Smith surveyed the mill on 23 October 1970. He described it as a roofless, empty tower retaining its floors. The mill was sold in 1973. The new owners carried out some repairs to the tower. By 1990, the tower had been converted to residential use. The mill was listed Grade II on 30 September 1987.

== Description ==
Sea Palling Windmill is a five storey tower mill. It may have been only three storeys when originally built, given the change in batter on the top two storeys. It had boat shape cap with a petticoat and gallery. Four double Patent sails were carried on a cast iron windshaft, as was a cast iron brake wheel. The sails had eight bays of three shutters. Two pairs of French Burr millstones were driven.
