= Scole =

Village in Norfolk, England

Coordinates: 52.366°N 1.156°E

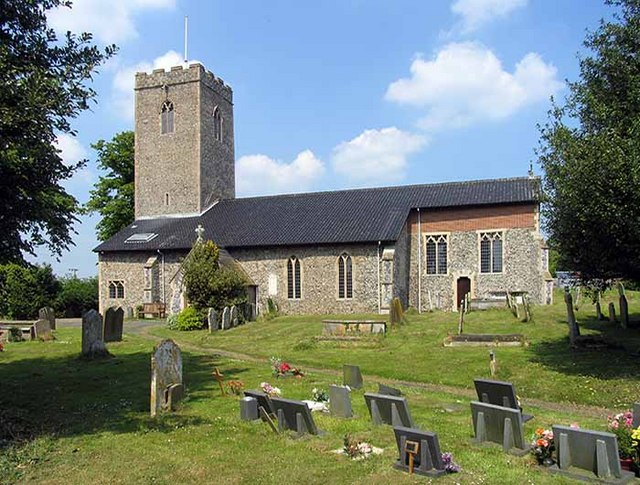
- St Andrew's Church, Scole

- Location within Norfolk
- Area: 14.31 km^{2} (5.53 sq mi)
- Population: 1,367
  - Density: 96/km^{2} (250/sq mi)
- OS grid reference: TM149789
- Civil parish: Scole
- District: South Norfolk
- Shire county: Norfolk
- Region: East
- Country: England
- Sovereign state: United Kingdom
- Post town: DISS
- Postcode district: IP21
- Dialling code: 01379
- Police: Norfolk
- Fire: Norfolk
- Ambulance: East of England
- UK Parliament: Waveney Valley

Scole (/ˈskoʊl/) is a village on the Norfolk–Suffolk border in England. It is 19 miles south of Norwich and lay on the old Roman road to Venta Icenorum, which was the main road until it was bypassed with a dual carriageway. It covers an area of 14.31 km^{2} (5.53 sq mi) and had a population of 1,339 in 563 households at the 2001 census; the population had increased to 1,367 at the 2011 Census.

It lies on the north bank of the River Waveney.

The parish church of St Andrew was rebuilt in the 1960s after being destroyed in an arson attack in 1963. There is an east window by Patrick Reyntiens dating from 1963. The stump of a windmill has been converted to residential use.

Scole is the birthplace of William Gooderham (1790) and Ezekiel Gooderham (1794), founders of the Gooderham and Worts distillery in Toronto, Canada, later to be the largest in the British Empire.

== Governance ==
An electoral ward in the same name exists. This ward stretches east to Needham and at the 2011 Census had a total population of 2,357.

== Climate ==
Climate data for Scole, (Note: Weather station is located 2.0 miles (3.2 km) from the Diss town centre.) (1991–2020 normals, extremes 1971–1980)
Month	Jan	Feb	Mar	Apr	May	Jun	Jul	Aug	Sep	Oct	Nov	Dec	Year
Record high °C (°F)	14.2 (57.6)	15.0 (59.0)	19.1 (66.4)	22.9 (73.2)	26.9 (80.4)	34.3 (93.7)	32.1 (89.8)	32.9 (91.2)	29.0 (84.2)	23.7 (74.7)	17.0 (62.6)	15.8 (60.4)	34.3 (93.7)
Mean daily maximum °C (°F)	7.2 (45.0)	8.0 (46.4)	10.8 (51.4)	14.1 (57.4)	17.6 (63.7)	20.8 (69.4)	22.8 (73.0)	22.7 (72.9)	19.7 (67.5)	15.0 (59.0)	10.7 (51.3)	7.8 (46.0)	14.8 (58.6)
Daily mean °C (°F)	4.4 (39.9)	4.8 (40.6)	6.7 (44.1)	9.4 (48.9)	12.7 (54.9)	15.5 (59.9)	17.4 (63.3)	17.4 (63.3)	14.9 (58.8)	11.3 (52.3)	7.4 (45.3)	5.0 (41.0)	10.6 (51.0)
Mean daily minimum °C (°F)	1.5 (34.7)	1.5 (34.7)	2.6 (36.7)	4.7 (40.5)	7.7 (45.9)	10.2 (50.4)	11.9 (53.4)	12.0 (53.6)	10.0 (50.0)	7.5 (45.5)	4.0 (39.2)	2.2 (36.0)	6.3 (43.3)
Record low °C (°F)	−13.3 (8.1)	−12.0 (10.4)	−4.3 (24.3)	−4.3 (24.3)	−1.6 (29.1)	1.7 (35.1)	3.7 (38.7)	4.0 (39.2)	0.8 (33.4)	−1.5 (29.3)	−6.2 (20.8)	−9.7 (14.5)	−13.3 (8.1)
Average precipitation mm (inches)	52.3 (2.06)	44.5 (1.75)	44.6 (1.76)	37.9 (1.49)	38.0 (1.50)	57.1 (2.25)	45.3 (1.78)	58.1 (2.29)	46.1 (1.81)	66.4 (2.61)	78.2 (3.08)	57.8 (2.28)	626.2 (24.65)
Average precipitation days (≥ 1.0 mm)	11.4	8.3	10.5	9.0	8.3	9.0	9.7	8.1	8.5	10.5	11.7	10.5	115.5
Mean monthly sunshine hours	64.4	71.4	118.3	175.0	217.2	207.2	217.5	200.3	162.3	110.8	68.4	62.3	1,675.3
Source 1: Met Office (precipitation days 1981–2010)
Source 2: Starlings Roost Weather

== See also ==
- Scole Experiment, a series of mediumistic séances which took place in the village
