= River Hor =

Tributary of the River Bure in Norfolk, England

Hor
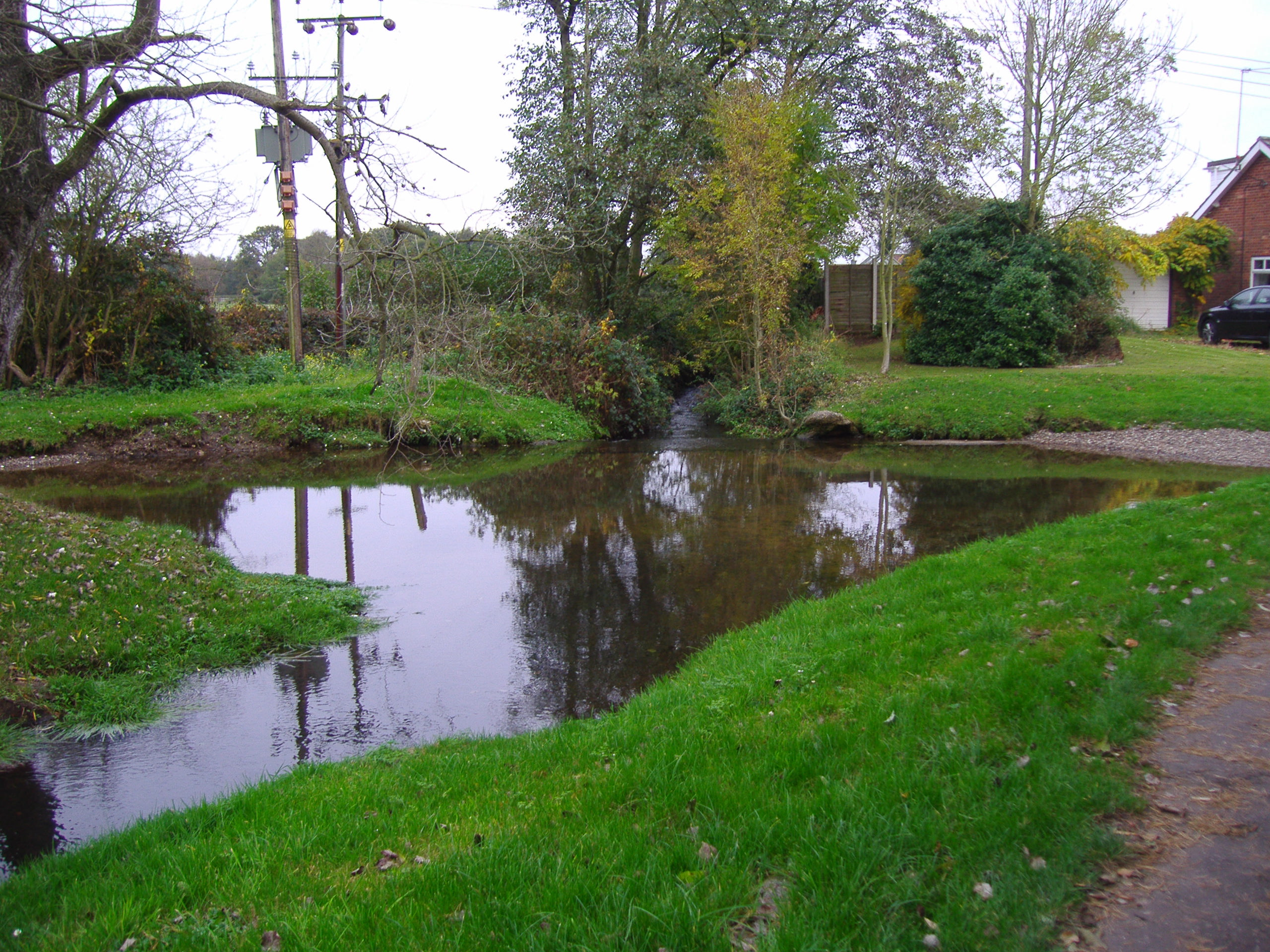
- The River Hor at Horsham St Faith

- Location within Norfolk

Location
- Country: England
- State: Norfolk
- Region: East of England
- District: Broadland

Physical characteristics
- Source: Spring in the churchyard of St Margaret's Church
  - location: Felthorpe
  - coordinates: 52.7103°N 1.2104°E
  - elevation: 34 m (112 ft)
- Mouth: River Bure
  - location: west of Wroxham
  - coordinates: 52°42′14″N 1°22′44″E
- Length: 13.3 km (8.3 mi)

Basin features
- River system: River Bure

The River Hor is a short river in the county of Norfolk, England. It runs 13.3 kilometres (8.3 mi) east from its source near Felthorpe to its confluence with the River Bure near Wroxham.

== History ==
The name of the river is probably a back-formation from the name of villages that it flows through. The village of Horsford has a name meaning "ford that horses can cross", so the river's name may be formed from that.
