= Malthouse Broad =

Freshwater lake in Norfolk, England

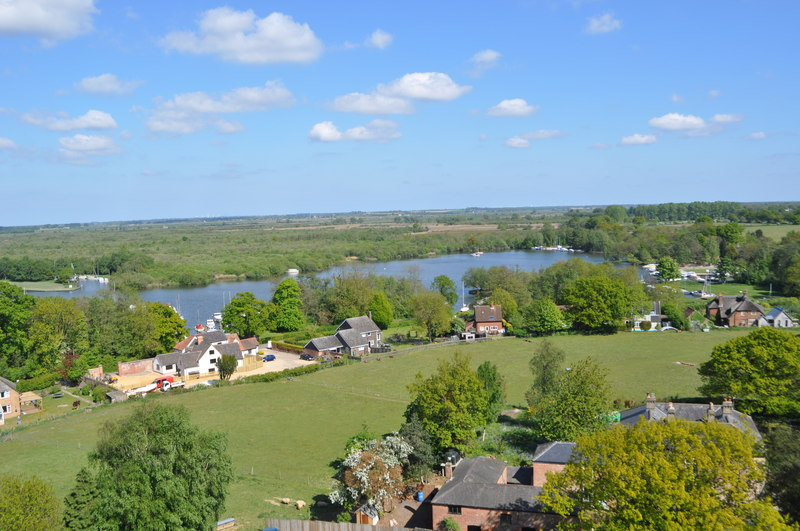
- Malthouse Broad in April 2011 from Ranworth church tower

- Location within Norfolk
- Location: Norfolk Broads
- Coordinates: 52°40′47″N 1°29′22″E
- Basin countries: United Kingdom
- Max. length: 0.64 km (0.40 mi)
- Max. width: 0.25 km (0.16 mi)

Malthouse Broad is a broad (i.e., lake) at Ranworth in the Norfolk Broads.

The "Helen of Ranworth" is a traditional reedlighter, a boat that carried away the reed harvest. Now it ferries visitors from Malthouse Broad to Ranworth Broad.
