= Reedlighter =

Historic boat used on the Norfolk Broads

A reedlighter (also a reed lighter ) is a type of boat used on the Norfolk Broads in England. After WWI they almost became extinct, but in recent years a small number have been built to maintain traditional reed-cutting methods. The term is also used for other modern, shallow-hulled, boats used on the Broads.

== Design ==
A beamy, shallow draft, open, clinker, double ended boat which could be rowed or quanted from either end and was mainly used on the northern waters of the Norfolk Broads, for transporting hay, 'marsh litter' (sedge) and reed for thatching, which was cut out on the marshes and then taken back to the staithes. Reed was carried in the winter, and sedge in the summer. The 20ft lighter, or 'load boat', could carry 600 'shoofs' (sheaves) of reed. For smaller loads and shallower dykes there were 'half load' and 'quarter load' boats while those used just for runabouts appear to have been called punts.

== Use ==
The load boats were taken up very shallow dykes and were loaded about 6ft high and because they were double ended could be moved out without needing to turn around. After World War I the practice of cutting the marshes by hand with scythes was no longer economic. As the reed lighter had a pointed stern it was difficult to fit an outboard so they dropped out of use.

Some new reedlighters, however, have been built for conservation work in the Broads.

== Examples of traditional reedlighters ==
The Museum of the Broads holds a small, unnamed 10.5ft ¾-load reedlighter, built in c 1920.

The Norfolk Wildlife Trust have two reedlighters at their site at Hickling Broad: Swallowtail (H439, 22'5"), and Little Tern (E135, 30'5"). Prince Charles travelled on a reedlighter during a visit to Hickling in 2001. Norfolk Wildlife Trust also have a reedlighter called Damselfly (4S, 28'7") at Ranworth Broad. Both Swallowtail and Damselfly were designed by Andrew Wolstenholme of Coltishall and built by Goodchild Marine of Burgh Castle. Damselfly and Little Tern are both motorised.

Alderman Norman II (1591Y, 23'6"), a replica of Swallowtail, is a recent (2019) construction. She is to be used for school boat trips at How Hill by the How Hill Trust. How Hill Trust also have the older (1988) Alderman Norman (23'). Both were funded by Alderman Norman's Foundation, a charitable foundation in Norfolk.

Helen of Ranworth is a motorised reedlighter which runs a ferry route between Ranworth Staithe and Malthouse Broad.

There is also a reedlighter called Reedlighter (25B, 20') which is privately owned.

There are other non-traditional boats registered as 'reedlighters', but which perform a similar function.

== Cultural references ==
Woodforde's Brewery at Woodbastwick in the Norfolk Broads make a pale ale called 'Reedlighter', named after the boat.
