= Horsford =

Village in Norfolk, England

Coordinates: 52.7007°N 1.2412°E

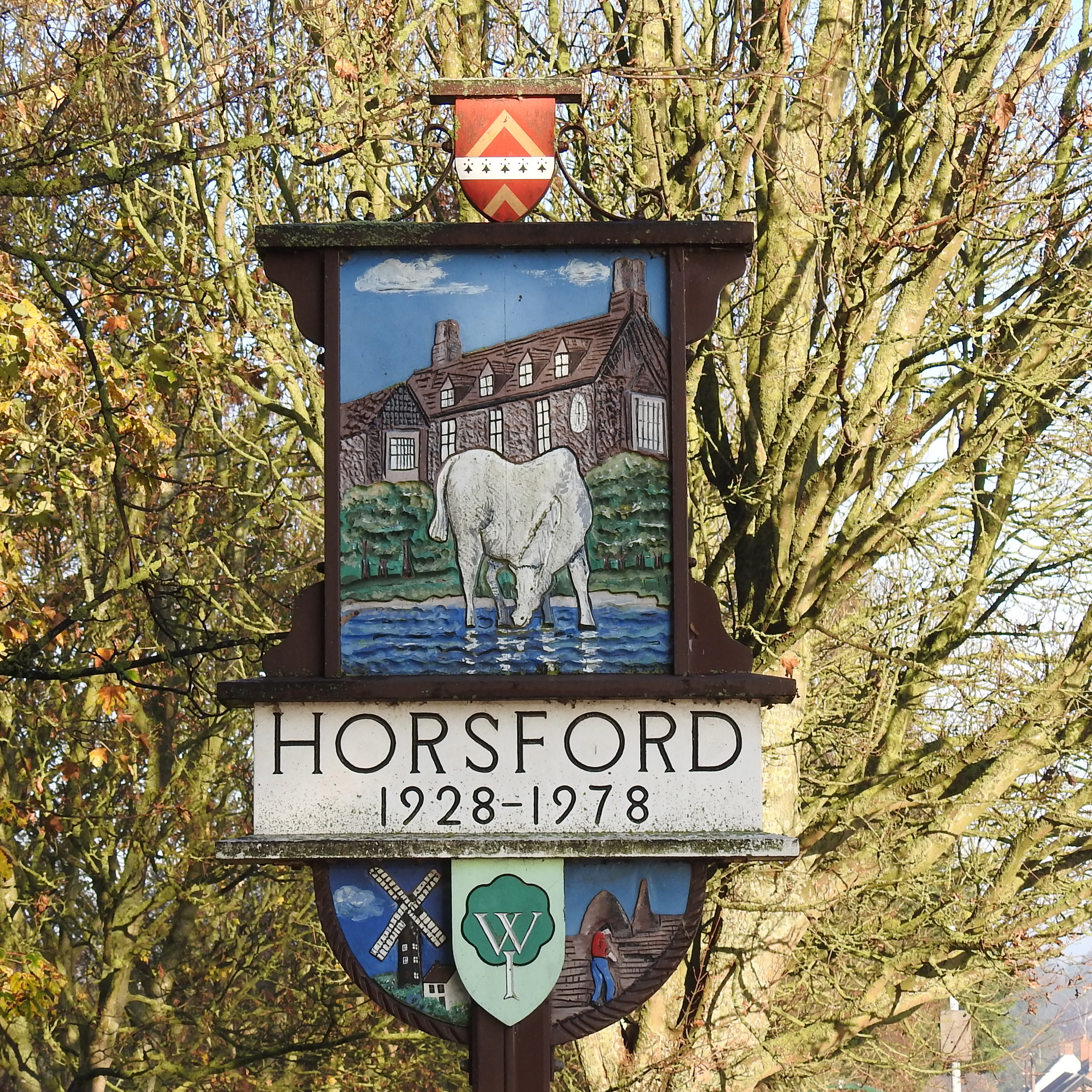
- Horsford Village Sign

- Location within Norfolk
- Area: 6.39 sq mi (16.6 km^{2})
- Population: 4,937 (2021 census)
  - Density: 773/sq mi (298/km^{2})
- OS grid reference: TG195165
- Civil parish: Horsford
- District: Broadland
- Shire county: Norfolk
- Region: East
- Country: England
- Sovereign state: United Kingdom
- Post town: NORWICH
- Postcode district: NR10
- Dialling code: 01603
- UK Parliament: Broadland and Fakenham

Horsford is a village and civil parish in the English county of Norfolk.

Horsford is located 6.4 miles (10.3 km) south of Aylsham and 6 miles (9.7 km) north-west of Norwich.

== History ==
Horsford's name is of Anglo-Saxon origin and derives from the Old English for horse ford.

In the Domesday Book, Horsford is listed as a settlement of 33 households hundred of Taverham. In 1086, the village was part of the East Anglian estates of Robert Malet.

Horsford Castle was a motte-and-bailey castle built by Robert Malet immediately after the Norman Conquest. Horsford Castle has been abandoned since the Fifteenth Century and is, today, a scheduled monument.

Holt Road, north of the village, is supposedly haunted by a highwayman. There is a windmill in the village, which has been converted to residential use, with some machinery conserved.

== Geography ==
According to the 2021 census, Horsford has a population of 4,937 people which shows an increase from the 4,163 people recorded in the 2011 census.

Horsford Woods is a 306 acres (124 ha) site of woodland which is cared for by the Woodland Trust. The woods are the habitat of the silver-studded blue butterfly.

== All Saints' Church ==
Horsford's parish church dates from the Fifteenth Century. All Saints' is located on Church Street and has been Grade II listed since 1961. The church holds Sunday service once a month.

All Saints' was restored in the Victorian era but still features a Thirteenth Century font and stained-glass windows installed by the Zetter workshop of Munich.

== Amenities & Leisure ==
Horsford Cricket Club plays home games at Manor Park which was also the home ground of Norfolk County Cricket from 2001 to 2024. Horsford CC operate multiple teams of men, women and juniors with the First Men's XI competing in the East Anglian Premier League.

Horsford Football Club play home games at Holt Road and operate teams for men, women and juniors with the Men's First Team playing in Division 2 of the Anglian Combination League.

Horsford Church of England Primary School is located on Holt Road and is part of the Nebula Federation.

== Notable residents ==
- William de Chesney- (d.1174) Anglo-Norman nobleman and sheriff, Lord of Horsford Manor.
- Thomas Blenerhasset- (1550-1624) poet and writer, born in Horsford.
- Octavius Mathias- (1805-1864) Anglican missionary to New Zealand, Vicar of Horsford.
- Sir Richard Barrett-Lennard OBE- (1898-1977) banker, lived in Horsford.
- Charles Jewson- (1909-1981) businessman, antiquarian and Lord Mayor of Norwich, lived & died in Horsford.
- Barry Bridges- (b.1941) England, Chelsea and Birmingham City footballer, born in Horsford and manager of Horsford United F.C.
- Mike Sutton- (1944-2020) Chester and Carlisle United footballer, lived in Horsford.
- Chris Sutton- (b.1973) Blackburn Rovers and Celtic footballer and manager, lived in Horsford.

== Public Pits ==
These small areas of woodland were formerly public pits awarded to the parishioners of Horsford under the Horsford Inclosure Act 1800 (39 & 40 Geo. 3. c. 65 Pr.).

In 1913 the Horsford Publics Pits Charity was formed to administer these pits in the parish. Initially income was from shooting and grazing rights, but in the late 20th century they were let to civil contractors who filled them with spoil from construction sites and the Trustees then planted them with trees.

Since 1997 the pits have been leased by the Horsford Parish Council who have undertaken to manage and maintain them as havens for wildlife and as amenity areas for the parishioners of Horsford.

== Neighbourhood Plan ==
In 2015 the Parish Council decided to consider the development of a neighbourhood plan and a steering group was formed made up of some councillors and some interested residents. Over the next two years a wide-ranging consultation took place and the plan was published in draft form. The plan was scrutinised by Broadland DC and an independent examiner before being put to the residents in a referendum which approved it.

== Governance ==
Horsford is part of the electoral ward of Horsford & Felthorpe for local elections and is part of the district of Broadland.

The village's national constituency is Broadland and Fakenham which has been represented by the Conservative Party's Jerome Mayhew MP since 2019.

== War Memorial ==
Horsford War Memorial is a granite pillar inside All Saints' Churchyard which lists the following names for the First World War:

Rank	Name	Unit	Date of death	Burial/Commemoration
2Lt.	Charles Sizeland	7th Bn., Norfolk Regiment	12 Oct. 1916	Thiepval Memorial
St1C	Reginald J. Harvey	HMS Natal (Cruiser)	30 Dec. 1915	Chatham Naval Memorial
Cpl.	William E. Barney	8th Bn., Norfolk Regiment	19 Mar. 1917	St. Sever Cemetery
LCpl.	Walter B. Ribbands	2nd Bn., Middlesex Regiment	20 Aug. 1918	Ligny-Saint-Flochel Cemetery
LCpl.	Leonard L. Smith	8th Bn., Norfolk Regiment	22 Oct. 1917	Poelcapelle British Cemetery
Dvr.	Robert J. Aldridge	Royal Field Artillery	16 Mar. 1919	All Saints' Churchyard
Gnr.	William Thomas	Royal Horse Artillery	4 May 1919	All Saints' Churchyard
Pnr.	Albert Moore	208th Coy., Royal Engineers	1 Jul. 1916	Thiepval Memorial
Pte.	Edwin Bunn	58th Bn., AIF	19 Jul. 1916	Rue-du-Bois Military Cemetery
Pte.	Benjamin C. Punt	2nd Bn., Bedfordshire Regiment	25 Dec. 1917	Lijssenthoek Military Cemetery
Pte.	Harry J. Bacon	10th Bn., CEF	28 Apr. 1917	Vimy Memorial
Pte.	William G. Blythe	1st Bn., Coldstream Guards	14 Sep. 1914	La Ferté Memorial
Pte.	Robert A. Blythe	6th Bn., Royal Dublin Fusiliers	8 Oct. 1918	Guizancourt Farm Cemetery
Pte.	Thomas C. Fiddy	1st Bn., Essex Regiment	6 Aug. 1915	Twelve Tree Copse Cemetery
Pte.	Benjamin J. Rayner	10th Bn., Royal Fusiliers	23 Jul. 1916	Thiepval Memorial
Pte.	Frederick Smith	2nd Bn., Norfolk Regiment	14 Apr. 1915	Basra War Cemetery
Pte.	Henry Smith	2nd Bn., Norfolk Regt.	31 Dec. 1916	Basra War Cemetery
Pte.	Walter S. Kirk	7th Bn., Norfolk Regt.	8 Aug. 1918	Morlancourt British Cemetery
Pte.	Edgar H. Larwood	7th Bn., Norfolk Regt.	1 Nov. 1918	Norwich Cemetery
Pte.	Frank H. Punt	11th Bn., Northumberland Fusilers	24 Sep. 1916	Thiepval Memorial
Pte.	Arthur J. Broom	Queen's Own Regiment	2 Dec. 1918	All Saints' Churchyard
Pte.	Ernest Smith	7th Bn., Queen's Own Regt.	2 May 1918	St. Sever Cemetery
Pte.	Percy Booty	2nd Bn., Sherwood Foresters	23 Mar. 1918	Arras Memorial
Pte.	Everitt L. Bacon	5th Bn., Sherwood Foresters	29 Mar. 1918	Aix-Noulette Cemetery
Pte.	Robert J. Bacon	7th Bn., Sherwood Foresters	27 Jun. 1917	Loos Cemetery
Pte.	Thomas W. Dyer	4th Bn., Suffolk Regiment	20 Jul. 1916	Thiepval Memorial

The following names were added after the Second World War:

Rank	Name	Unit	Date of death	Burial/Commemoration
Capt.	Frederick E. Hollis	Royal Artillery	3 Mar. 1945	Groesbeek War Cemetery
Sgt.	David C. B. Barrett	Royal Army Medical Corps	3 Mar. 1948	All Saints' Churchyard
AS	Ernest A. Laws	HMS Swift (Destroyer)	25 Jun. 1944	Portsmouth Naval Memorial
Pte.	Arthur H. Broom	Royal Norfolk Regiment	11 May 1947	All Saints' Churchyard
Pte.	Cecil R. Broom	6th Bn., Royal Norfolks	25 Jan. 1942	Kranji War Memorial
Pte.	Stanley T. Fox	5th Bn., Sherwood Foresters	25 Dec. 1944	Olšany Cemetery
Pte.	Gwilym Jarman	4th Bn., Welch Regiment	14 Jan. 1946	Südfriedhof
