= Billingford Windmill =

Windmill in Billingford, Norfolk, England

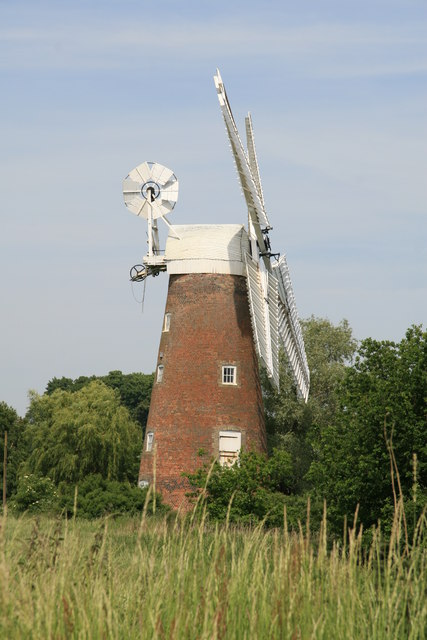
- Billingford Mill
- Interactive map of Billingford Windmill

Origin
- Mill name: Billingford Mill
- Grid reference: TM 167 786
- Coordinates: 52.3622°N 1.1808°E
- Operator: Norfolk Windmills Trust
- Year built: 1859

Information
- Purpose: Corn mill
- Type: Tower mill
- Storeys: Five storeys
- No. of sails: Four sails
- Type of sails: Double Patent sails
- Windshaft: cast iron
- Winding: Fantail
- Fantail blades: Six blades
- Auxiliary power: Steam engine, later replaced by an oil engine
- No. of pairs of millstones: Two pairs, a third pair driven by engine
- Size of millstones: Engine driven stones 3 feet (910 mm) diameter
- Other information: Last windmill to work by wind commercially in Norfolk

Billingford Windmill is a grade II* listed brick tower mill at Billingford near Diss, Norfolk, England which has been preserved and restored to working order. As of June 2009, the mill is under repair, with new sails being made.

== History ==
A windmill was first marked on William Faden's map of Norfolk published in 1797. This was a post mill which drove two pairs of millstones. The mill was blown down on 22 September 1859.

A new tower mill was built for William Chaplyn to replace the post mill. It cost £1,300 and was completed by March 1860. In 1872 the miller, Henry Pike, was sued for supplying meal unfit for consumption. He admitted having added some starch fibre to the meal. Judgement was given in his favour, but with 30s deducted and no order for costs being granted.

William Chaplyn died in 1881 and the mill was put up for sale by auction on 21 June 1881 at the King's Head Hotel, Diss but it remained unsold and was later offered to let. Provision had been made by this date for the mill to be driven by a steam engine. The mill was worked by a succession of millers through the years. An oil engine had been installed as auxiliary power by 1916.

In 1924, the mill was bought by George Daines, who worked it, and took on a partner in 1929. In 1933, his son Arthur joined the firm and worked the mill until called up to the Royal Navy during the Second World War. Upon his return in 1945, over £300 had to be spent repairing the mill to return it to working order. The mill was reduced to two sails. Arthur Daines worked the mill by wind until 1956 - the last windmill to work commercially by wind in Norfolk. Milling continued by engine power until 1959 when an outbreak of fowl pest killed off the remaining trade.

The mill was purchased by Victor Valiant who intended that it should be preserved. In February 1962, Messrs Thompson's, the Alford millwrights commenced restoration work. An appeal was launched in March 1962 by the Society for the Protection of Ancient Buildings launched an appeal for £1,450. Grants of £1,000 each were given by the Historic Buildings Council and Norfolk County Council. The restoration cost £3,939 The cap, which had been tarred, was painted white. The outbuildings around the mill were demolished. On 24 September 1965, Mr Valiant gave the mill to the Norfolk Windmills Trust.

On the night of 2–3 January 1976, the fantail was destroyed in a gale. A replacement was made and fitted in March 1976 by Messrs Barrett and Lawn, millwrights. On 14 July 1977, a 52 feet (15.85 m) long fabricated steel stock was fitted by Lennard and Lawn, replacing a Columbian pine stock which had been fitted when the mill was restored in 1962. In 1998, Norfolk Windmills Trust had the mill put back into full working order. In 2002 Linda Joslin became the first woman miller at Billingford and together with a team of volunteers began milling English Organic wheat. The first "Billingford Loaf" for 50 years was produced that year and became very popular around Norfolk with the stones grinding the wheat whenever the wind blew strongly enough. Linda was made to leave the mill after a long and very public dispute having been asked to fully maintain the mill although she was not the owner. The mill was not used for a few years and has consequently deteriorated. On 11 June 2009, the sails were removed as they had been discovered to be rotten and in need of replacement. The new sails have been made by Thompsons, the Alford millwrights. and were installed in September 2020.

== Description ==
Billingford Windmill is a five-storey tower mill with a boat-shaped cap winded by a fantail. The tower is 36 feet (10.97 m) high to curb level. It has four double Patent sails carried on a cast-iron windshaft. The brake wheel carries a tablet inscribed "W SKINNER 1860". The upright shaft is of cast iron, and is 4 1/2 inches (114 millimetres) diameter. The great spur wheel is only 5 feet 4 1/2 inches (1.64 metres) diameter. The two pairs of millstones are driven overdrift. A third pair is housed on a hurst frame on the ground floor of the mill and can be driven by engine.

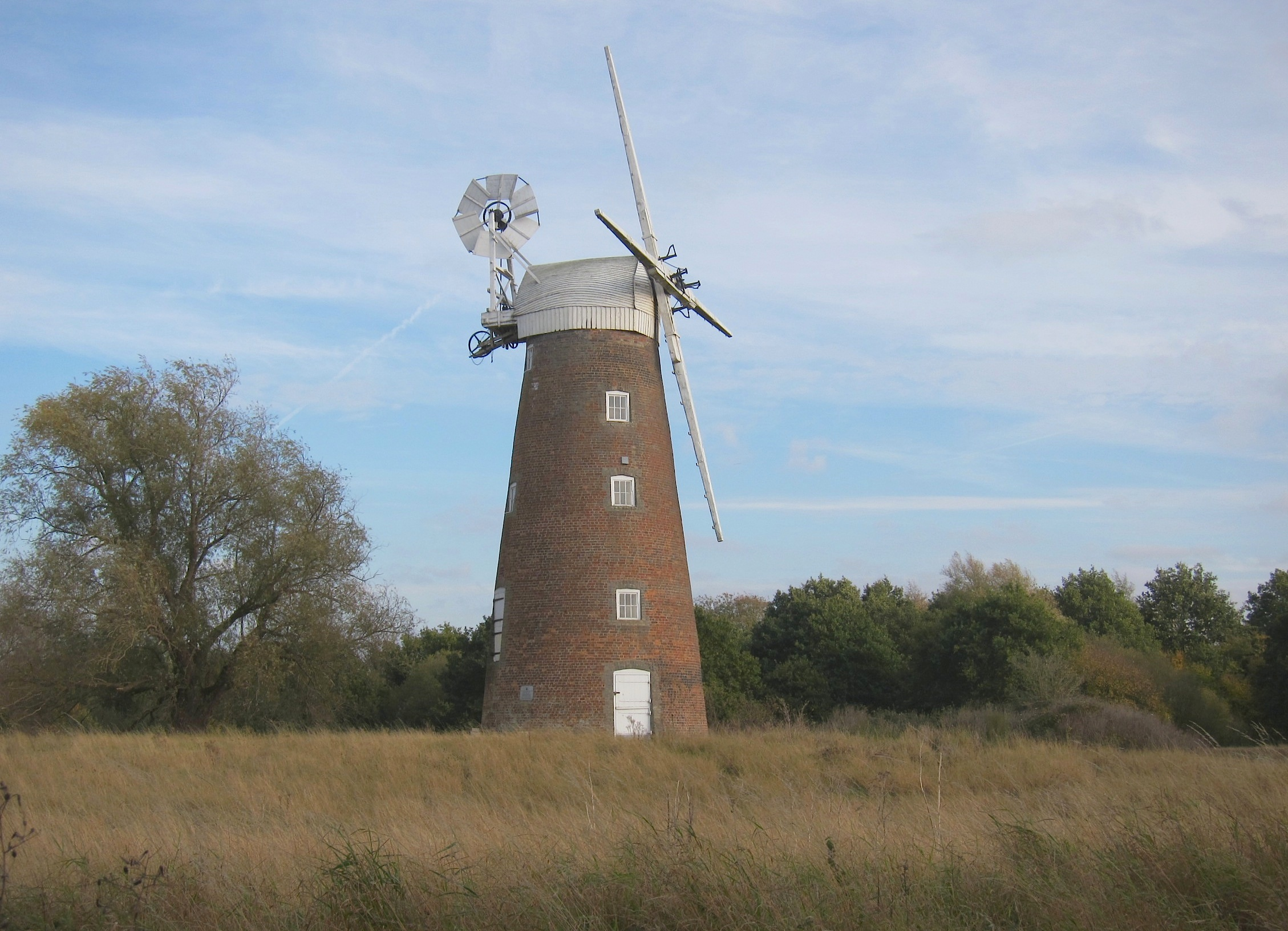
Autumn full height view, from west

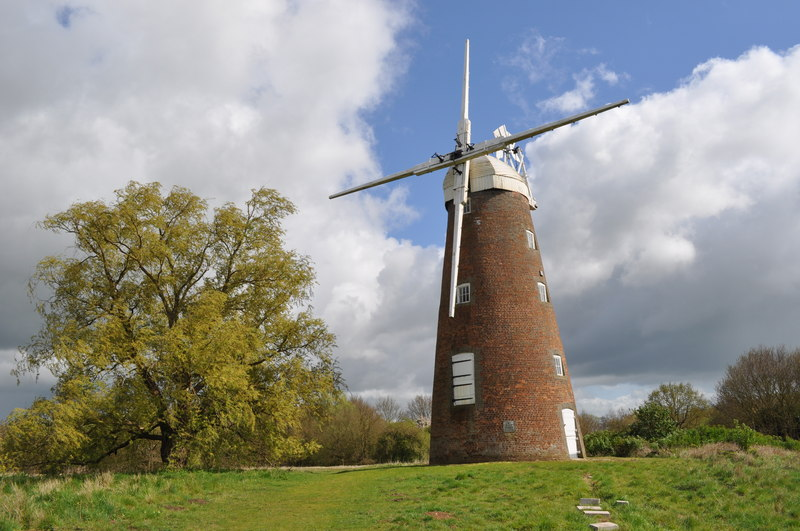
The mill in 2010

== Millers ==
- George Goddard 1860-68
- Edward Woodrow 1868
- Henry Pike 1872
- John Button 1875
- Robert Gaze 1877
- Robert Weavers 1883
- John Cross 1892-1904
- Richard Wood Crawshay 1908-12
- Walter James Staff 1916
- George Arthur Daines 1924-29
- Daines & Chase 1929-33
- G A Daines & Son 1933-37
- Arthur Daines 1945-59

Reference for above:-

== Public access ==
Billingford mill is open to the public on a number of Sundays and Bank Holidays or by arrangement with Norfolk Windmills Trust.

== Culture and media ==
James Henry Govier (1910–1974), a talented amateur artist who lived at nearby Hoxne produced a number of paintings of this windmill.
