= 1931 Birthday Honours =

British government recognitions

The King's Birthday Honours 1931 were appointments by King George V to various orders and honours to reward and highlight good works by members of the British Empire. The appointments were made to celebrate the official birthday of The King. They were published on 2 June 1931.

The recipients of honours are displayed here as they were styled before their new honour, and arranged by honour, with classes (Knight, Knight Grand Cross, etc.) and then divisions (Military, Civil, etc.) as appropriate.

== British Empire ==
=== Privy Councillor ===
- Major-General Alexander Augustus Frederick William Alfred George, Earl of Athlone, KG, GCB, GCMG, GCVO, DSO, lately Governor-General of the Union of South Africa and High Commissioner for South Africa.
- Sir William Allen Jowitt, KC, MP, Attorney-General since 1929. Member of Parliament for Preston since 1929, and for the Hartlepools, 1922–1924.

=== Baronet ===
- Philip Henry Devitt, Chairman of Devitt & Moore's Ocean Training Ships Limited, and Founder of the Nautical College, Pangbourne.
- Sir Edward Elgar, OM, KCVO, Mus. Doc, LLD. Master of the Music in Ordinary to His Majesty.
- Sir Herbert Gibson, KBE. For services in connection with the British Empire Trade Exhibition at Buenos Aires.
- Sir Thomas Jaffrey, LLD, Lord Rector's Assessor of Aberdeen University Court since 1924. Chairman of the Aberdeen Art Gallery Committee.

=== Knight Bachelor ===
- James Black Baillie, OBE, Vice Chancellor, Leeds University.
- Alfred Baker, JP. Solicitor to the National Labour Party, the London Labour Party, the Miners' Federation of Great Britain, etc. For public and political services.
- John Ferguson Bell, MInstCE, MIMechE, JP. Lately Mayor of Derby. For public services in Derby.
- Montague Burton, JP. A generous benefactor to Leeds and other Universities. For public services in the cause of industrial relationships.
- Archibald Henry Campbell, Chairman of the Committee for General Purposes, London Stock Exchange.
- His Honour Judge Ralph Bertie Peter Cator, Vice-President of the International Mixed Court of Appeal in Egypt.
- James Lewis Caw, FSA(Sc), lately Director of the National Galleries of Scotland.
- Arthur Ernest Cowley, DLitt, LittD, FBA, Librarian, Bodleian Library, Oxford.
- William Cecil Dampier Dampier-Whetham, MA, ScD, FRS. Fellow of Trinity College, Cambridge. For services to agriculture.
- Alderman William Davy, JP, Lord Mayor of Manchester, 1927–1928. For public and political services.
- Henry Wade Deacon, CBE, JP, Chairman of the Lancashire County Council. President of the Council and Pro-Chancellor, University of Liverpool. For public services in Lancashire.
- Frank Walter Goldstone, General Secretary of the National Union of Teachers. Member of Parliament for Sunderland, 1910–1918. For public and political services.
- Harry Hague. A generous benefactor to hospitals.
- Pendrill Charles Varrier-Jones, MA, MRCS, MRCP. Founder & Medical Director of Papworth Village Settlement for the treatment of Tuberculosis.
- Thomas Kelly, Lord Provost of Glasgow.
- Horace Lamb, MA, LLD, DSc, ScD, FRS, FRSE, Mathematical Physicist. Honorary Fellow of Trinity College, Cambridge. Emeritus Professor of Mathematics in the University of Manchester.
- Charles Reed Peers, CBE, MA, FBA, FRIBA, President of the Royal Society of Antiquaries.
- Roy Lister Robinson, OBE, Vice-Chairman & Technical Commissioner, Forestry Commission.
- George Richard Francis Shee, Secretary of the Royal National Lifeboat Institution.
- His Honour Judge Thomas Mordaunt Snagge, Judge of County Courts.
- William Ernest Reynolds-Stephens, ARIBA, President of the Royal Society of British Sculptors.
- Ben Turner, CBE, JP, MP. Member of Parliament for Batley & Morley, 1922–24 and since 1929. Secretary for Mines, 1929–30. President, National Union of Textile Workers. For public and political services.
- John Stewart Stewart-Wallace, CB, Chief Land Registrar, HM Land Registry.
- Thomas Barnby Whitson, CA, FRSE, Lord Provost of Edinburgh.
- Samuel Wilson. Lately Senior Commissioner Land Purchase Commission, Northern Ireland.

Dominions

- Charles McNess, of the City of Perth, Western Australia. For philanthropic services in that State,

India

- Govind Balvant Pradhan, JP, Member of the Governor of Bombay's Executive Council, Bombay.
- Mr. Justice William Carr, Indian Civil Service, Puisne Judge of the High Court of Judicature at Rangoon, Burma.
- Mr. Justice Govind Dinanath Madgaonkar, Indian Civil Service, lately Puisne Judge of the High Court of Judicature at Bombay.
- Mr. Justice Edward Hamilton Wallace, Indian Civil Service, Puisne Judge of the High Court of Judicature at Madras.
- Ernest Burdon, CSI, CIE, Indian Civil Service, Auditor-General in India.
- Hubert Arthur Sams, CIE, Indian Civil Service, Director-General, Posts & Telegraphs.
- Nripendra Nath Sircar, Barrister-at-Law, Advocate-General, Bengal.
- Robert John Sherwood Dodd, CSI, Indian Police Service, Inspector-General of Police, United Provinces.
- Thomas Everard Tichborne Upton, Solicitor, to the Government of India.
- Colonel Samuel Richard Christophers, MB, CIE, OBE, FRS, Indian Medical Service (retired), Director, Central Research Institute, Kasauli.
- Lieutenant-Colonel Henry Albert John Gidney, FRCSE, MLA, Indian Medical Service (retired).
- Brevet-Major Sardar Wazirzada Hissamuddin Bahadur, CIE, IDSM, Indian Army, of Peshawar, North-West Frontier Province.
- William Robinson, CBE, Secretary, Financial Department, India Office, London.
- Walter Lancelot Travers, CIE, OBE, MLC, Manager, Baradighi Tea Estate, Jalpaiguri, Bengal.
- Maulavi Muhammad Yakub, MLA, Pleader, Moradabad, United Provinces.
- Chaudhri Chhajju Ram, CIE, Landowner and Jute Merchant, Hissar District, Punjab.
- Abdulla Suhrawardy, DLitt, PhD, MLA.
- Sarvapalli Radha Krishnan, King George V Professor of Philosophy, Calcutta University, Bengal.

Colonies, Protectorates, &c.

- Charles Frederic Belcher, OBE, Chief Justice of Trinidad and Tobago.
- Henry Lawson De Mel, CBE. For public and philanthropic services in Ceylon.
- Arthur Wileman Farquharson, Chairman, Jamaica Banana Producers' Association. For services to Jamaica.
- Donald Kingdon, Chief Justice of Nigeria.

=== Order of the Bath ===
==== Knight Grand Cross of the Order of the Bath (GCB) ====
Military Division

Army

- General Sir Reginald Clare Hart, VC, KCB, KCVO, retired pay, Colonel Commandant, Royal Engineers.

Royal Air Force

- Air Chief-Marshal Sir John Maitland Salmond, KCB, CMG, CVO, DSO, .

==== Knight Commander of the Order of the Bath (KCB) ====
Military Division

Royal Navy

- Vice-Admiral Vernon Harry Stuart Haggard, CB, CMG.
- Vice-Admiral William Henry Dudley Boyle, CB.

Army

- Lieutenant-General Felix Fordati Ready, CB, CSI, CMG, DSO, Colonel, The Royal Berkshire Regiment (Princess Charlotte of Wales's), Quartermaster-General to the Forces, War Office.
- Major-General Philip Gordon Grant, CB, CMG, (late Royal Engineers), Director of Works, War Office.
- Major-General Charles William Gwynn, CB, CMG, DSO, (late Royal Engineers), formerly Commandant, Staff College, now retired pay.
- Lieutenant-General Sir Walter Stewart Leslie, KBE, CB, CMG, DSO, Indian Army, Commander, Lahore District, India.

Royal Air Force

- Air Vice-Marshal Charles Laverock Lambe, CB, CMG, DSO.

Civil Division

- Colonel Sir Clive Wigram, KCVO, CB, CSI, Private Secretary and Extra Equerry to His Majesty.

==== Companion of the Order of the Bath (CB) ====
Military Division

Royal Navy

- Rear-Admiral Thomas Norman James, MVO.
- Rear-Admiral Frank Forrester Rose, DSO.
- Engineer Rear-Admiral Herbert Lyell Parry, OBE.
- Surgeon Rear-Admiral Alfred James Hewitt, CBE, LRCP&S.
- Paymaster Captain Frank Lankester Horsey, OBE, DSC.

Army

- Major-General William Richard Blackwell, CMG, KHS, (late Royal Army Medical Corps), Deputy Director-General, Army Medical Services, War Office.
- Major-General Robert Gordon-Finlayson, CMG, DSO, (late Royal Artillery), formerly Commander, Royal Artillery, 3rd Division, Southern Command, now half pay list.
- Major-General Henry Needham, CMG, DSO, (late The Worcestershire Regiment), formerly Military Attaché, Paris, now half pay list.
- Major-General Gervase Thorpe, CMG, DSO, (late The Argyll and Sutherland Highlanders (Princess Louise's)), formerly Commander, 3rd Infantry Brigade, Aldershot Command, now half pay list.
- Colonel (Honorary Brigadier-General) Richard Elles Solly-Flood, CMG, DSO, (late The Rifle Brigade (Prince Consort's Own)), formerly Commander, 8th (Bareilly) Infantry Brigade, Indian Army, now retired pay.
- Colonel Richard Oakes, CBE, (late Royal Engineers), President Royal Engineer Board.
- Major-General James Drummond Graham, CIE, MB, KHS, Indian Medical Service, Public Health Commissioner, Government of India.
- Colonel (temporary Brigadier) Clement Arthur Milward, CIE, CBE, DSO, ADC, Indian Army, late Commander, Nowshera Brigade, India.
- Colonel John Gerald McConaghy, DSO, MVO, Indian Army, General Staff Officer, 1st Grade, Headquarters of the Army in India.
- Colonel Alan George Caldwell Hutchinson, OBE, Indian Army, late Assistant Quarter-Master-General, Southern Command, India.

Civil Division

- Alexander Percy McMullen, MA, Adviser on Education, Admiralty.
- Colonel Stephen Rhodes, DSO, TD, Territorial Army.
- Cecil Fane De Salis, DL, JP, Chairman, Territorial Army and Air Force Association of the County of Middlesex.
- Charles Aitken. Lately Director of the National Gallery, Millbank.
- George Selby Washington Epps, CBE, Deputy Government Actuary.
- The Honourable Hugh John Godley, MA, KC, Counsel to the Chairmen of Committees, House of Lords.
- Lieutenant-Colonel Alan Henry Lawrence Mount, CBE, Royal Engineers (Retd.) Chief Inspecting Officer of Railways, Ministry of Transport.
- William George Brookfield Ritchie, Legal Adviser, Board of Education.
- Leon Simon, Director of Telegraphs & Telephones, General Post Office.

=== Order of Merit (OM) ===
- Sir William Henry Bragg, KBE, FRS, , , in recognition of his eminent services in the advancement of Science.

=== Order of the Star of India ===
==== Knight Commander of the Order of the Star of India (KCSI) ====
- Sir George Ernest Schuster, KCMG, CBE, MC, Member of the Governor-General's Executive Council.

==== Companion of the Order of the Star of India (CSI) ====
- William David Russell Prentice, CIE, Indian Civil Service, Member of the Executive Council of the Governor of Bengal.
- Charles William Egerton Cotton, CIE, Indian Civil Service, Chief Secretary to the Government of Madras.
- Raja Padam Singh, Raja of Bashahr, Simla Hills States, Punjab.
- Lawrence Morley Stubbs, CIE, Indian Civil Service, Commissioner, Rohilkhand Division, United Provinces.
- George Cunningham, CIE, OBE, of the Political Department, lately Private Secretary to His Excellency the Viceroy.
- Colonel (temporary Brigadier) William Harry Evans, CIE, DSO, (late Royal Engineers), Chief Engineer, Western Command, India, and Secretary, Public Works Department, to the Agent to the Governor-General, Baluchistan.

Additional Companions

- Herbert William Emerson, CIE, CBE, Indian Civil Service, Secretary to the Government of India in the Home Department.
- Gerald Sidney Wilson, Indian Police Service, Commissioner of Police, Bombay.

=== Order of Saint Michael and Saint George ===
==== Knight Grand Cross of the Order of St Michael and St George (GCMG) ====
- Sir Cecil Clementi, KCMG, Governor & Commander-in-Chief of the Straits Settlements and High Commissioner for the Malay States.

==== Knight Commander of the Order of St Michael and St George (KCMG) ====
- Wilfrid Edward Francis Jackson, CMG, Governor & Commander-in-Chief of the Island of Mauritius.
- Lieutenant-Colonel Thomas Reginald St. Johnston, CMG, Governor & Commander-in-Chief of the Leeward Islands.
- The Most Reverend William Marlborough Carter, DD, formerly Archbishop of Cape Town.
- Sir John Middleton, KBE, CMG, Governor & Commander-in-Chief of Newfoundland.
- Sir John Loader Maffey, KCVO, CSI, CIE, Governor-General of the Sudan.
- Harold Eustace Satow, OBE, His Majesty's Consul-General at Beirut.
- Walford Harmood Montague Selby, CB, CVO, Private Secretary to His Majesty's Principal Secretary of State for Foreign Affairs.

==== Companion of the Order of St Michael and St George (CMG) ====
- Arthur Charles Carrara, KC, formerly Unofficial Member of the Executive Council, Gibraltar. For public services.
- Edward Walter Evans, Colonial Secretary, Bermuda.
- Major Arthur Salisbury Lawrance, DSO, Secretary to Government, Somaliland Protectorate.
- Gerald Verner Maxwell, Chief Native Commissioner, Kenya.
- Geoffry Alexander Stafford Northcote, Colonial Secretary, Gold Coast.
- George Ernest Shaw, OBE, LLB, General Adviser, Johore, Malay States.
- Mark Aitchison Young, Chief Secretary, Palestine.
- Rupert Beswicke Howorth, CB, Deputy Secretary to the Cabinet.
- Commander Horace Leslie Morgan, DSO, Commanding Officer of HMS Veronica. For services in the earthquake relief operations, Dominion of New Zealand.
- William Nathaniel Robertson, CBE, MB, Vice-Chancellor of the University of Queensland.
- The Honourable Tasman Shields, LLB, Member of the Legislative Council, State of Tasmania.
- Geoffrey Granville Whiskard, CB, Assistant Under Secretary of State, Dominions Office, and Vice Chairman, Overseas Settlement Committee.
- William Eric Beckett, Second Legal Adviser to the Foreign Office.
- Harry Owen Chalkley, CBE, Commercial Counsellor at His Majesty's Embassy at Washington.
- John Francis Johns, His Majesty's Consul-General at Bangkok.
- John Lowdon, His Majesty's Consul-General at Cologne.
- Horace Ardran Mayne, Inspector-General of Telegraphs & Telephones, Egyptian Ministry of Communications.

Honorary Member

- His Highness Tuan Syed Alwi, ibni almerhum Syed San, CBE, Raja of Perlis, Malay States.

=== Order of the Indian Empire ===
==== Knight Grand Commander of the Order of the Indian Empire (GCIE) ====
- Captain His Highness Ruku-ud-Daula Nusrat-i-Jang Hafiz-ul-Mulk Mukhlis-ud-Daula Nawab Sir Sadiq Muhammad Khan, Abbasi Bahadur, KCSI, KCVO, Nawab of Bahawalpur, Punjab States.
- Colonel His Highness Maharaja Sir Sajjan Singh, KCSI, KCVO, Maharaja of Ratlam, Central India.

==== Knight Commander of the Order of the Indian Empire (KCIE) ====
- Leonard William Reynolds, CSI, CIE, MC, of the Political Department, Agent to the Governor-General in Rajputana and Chief Commissioner, Ajmer-Merwara.
- James David Sifton, CSI, CIE, Indian Civil Service, Member of the Executive Council of the Governor of Bihar & Orissa.

==== Companion of the Order of the Indian Empire (CIE) ====
- Alfred William White Mackie, Indian Civil Service, Acting Commissioner, Central Division, Bombay Presidency.
- Alexander Cameron Badenoch, Indian Civil Service, lately Director of Railway Audit.
- Khan Bahadur Nawab Muzaffar Khan, Punjab Civil Service, Director, Information Bureau, and Joint Secretary to the Government of the Punjab in the Transferred Departments.
- Henry Reginald Pate, Indian Civil Service, Secretary to Government, Revenue Department, Madras.
- Andrew McKerral, Indian Agricultural Service, Director of Agriculture, Burma.
- Charles Adolf Malcolm, Indian Forest Service, Chief Conservator of Forests, Central Provinces.
- Lieutenant-Colonel Francis Claude Shelmerdine, OBE, lately Director of Civil Aviation.
- John Anderson Thorne, Indian Civil Service, Collector and District Magistrate, Madras.
- Percival Clifford Bamford, Indian Police Service, Deputy Director, Intelligence Bureau, Government of India.
- Lieutenant-Colonel Frederick Charles Temple, Chief Town Engineer and Administrator of Tata Iron and Steel Company, Jamshedpur, Bihar & Orissa.
- Lieutenant-Colonel Hubert Champion Garbett, Tea Planter, Assam.
- Hattiangadi Shankar Rau, Indian Audit Department, Budget Officer, Finance Department, Government of India.
- James Alister Pope, Indian Civil Service, Excise Commissioner in Central India and Adviser on Opium Affairs for Central India and Rajputana, Indore.
- Captain Henry Aloysius Bruno Digby-Beste, OBE, Royal Indian Marine, Captain-Superintendent of the Indian Mercantile Marine Training Ship Dufferin, Bombay.
- Henry Buswell Wetherill, Indian Educational Service, Inspector of Schools, United Provinces.
- William Stewart Fraser, OBE, Locomotive Superintendent, Metre Gauge, Bombay, Baroda and Central India Railway, Ajmer-Merwara.
- Charles Godfrey Chenevix-Trench, Indian Civil Service (retired), Settlement Commissioner, Mewar State, Rajputana.
- Leslie Charles Coleman, PhD, Director of Agriculture, Mysore State.
- Rai Bahadur Prabhat Chandra Bose, Pleader, Jubbulpore, Central Provinces.
- Amir Sheikh Mahamadbhai Abdullabhai, Dewan, Junagadh State, Western India States Agency.
- U Zaw Pe, Indian Educational Service, Inspector of Schools, Burma.
- Alan Ross Leishman, VD, Manager, James Finlay and Company, Chittagong, Bengal.
- Muhammad Yamin Khan, Barrister-at-Law, Landowner, United Provinces.
- Charu Chandra Biswas, MLA, Vakil, High Court, Calcutta, Bengal.
- Alexander Monro, Indian Civil Service, Deputy Commissioner, Lucknow, United Provinces.

Additional Companions

- John Thomas Donovan, Indian Civil Service, Magistrate and Collector, Bakarganj, Bengal.
- Herbert Ross Gould, Indian Civil Service, Collector and District Magistrate, Poona, Bombay.
- John Frederick Hall, OBE, Indian Civil Service, Collector and District Magistrate, Madras.
- Samuel Thomas Hollins, Indian Police Service, Deputy Inspector-General of Police, United Provinces.
- Cyril Templeton Brett, Indian Police Service, Deputy Inspector-General of Police, Bihar & Orissa.
- Barry Charles Alfred Lawther, Indian Police Service, Deputy Inspector-General of Police, North-West Frontier Province.
- Arthur Charles John Bailey, Indian Police Service, Officiating Deputy Inspector-General of Police, Southern Range, Belgaum, Bombay.
- William Norman Prentice Jenkin, Indian Police Service, Superintendent of Police, Punjab.

=== Royal Victorian Order ===
==== Knight Grand Cross of the Royal Victorian Order (GCVO) ====
- Field Marshal Sir William Robertson, Bt, GCB, GCMG, KCVO, DSO.
- Sir William Llewellyn, KCVO.

==== Knight Commander of the Royal Victorian Order (KCVO) ====
- Major-General Sir Samuel Guise Guise-Moores, KCB, CMG.
- Ralph Endersby Harwood, CB, CVO, CBE.
- Colonel Arthur Edward Erskine, CVO, DSO.

==== Commander of the Royal Victorian Order (CVO) ====
- Colonel Reginald Edmund Maghlin Russell, CBE, DSO.
- Lieutenant-Colonel Henry Valentine Bache de Satgé, CMG, DSO.
- Engineer Captain Ronald Charles Boddie, DSO, Royal Navy.
- Arthur William Steuart Cochrane, MVO.
- Major The Honourable Alexander Henry Louis Hardinge, MVO, MC.
- Wing Commander Ernest Henry Johnston, OBE, DFC.
- David Taylor Monteath, OBE.
- Captain Edward de Faye Renouf, Royal Navy.
- Francis James Grant.

==== Member of the Royal Victorian Order, 4th class (MVO) ====
- Lieutenant-Colonel Piers William North, DSO.
- Lieutenant-Colonel Geoffrey Bulmer Howell, MC.
- The Reverend Trevitt Reginald Hine-Haycock.

==== Member of the Royal Victorian Order, 5th class (MVO) ====
- Arthur Thomas Coombs.
- Commissioned Gunner Walter George Collingwood Crouch, DSC, Royal Navy.
- Commissioned Warrant Officer Samuel Mackenzie Hammond, Royal Navy.
- Ernest Harry Lucking.

=== Order of the British Empire ===
==== Knight Commander of the Order of the British Empire (KBE) ====
Military Division

Royal Navy

- Vice-Admiral Albert Percy Addison, CB, CMG.

Army

- Major-General Guy Archibald Hastings Beatty, CB, CSI, CMG, DSO, Indian Army, Military Adviser-in-Chief, Indian State Forces.

Civil Division

- Roderick Sinclair Meiklejohn, CB, First Commissioner, Civil Service Commission.
- Richard Roy Maconachie, CIE, His Majesty's Envoy Extraordinary & Minister Plenipotentiary at Kabul.
- Bernard Henry Bourdillon, CMG, Colonial Secretary, Ceylon.

==== Dame Commander of the Order of the British Empire (DBE) ====
Military Division

- Joanna Margaret Cruickshank, CBE, RRC, late Matron-in-Chief, Princess Mary's Royal Air Force Nursing Service.

Civil Division

- Sarah Elizabeth Siddons Mair, LLD. For services to women's education in Edinburgh.
- Agnes Sybil Casson, LLD, (Sybil Thorndike), Actress and manager. For her services to dramatic art.
- Her Highness Maharani Lakshmibai Sahiba Puar, of Dhar, President, Council of Minority Administration, Dhar State, Central India.

==== Commander of the Order of the British Empire (CBE) ====
Military Division

Army

- Colonel John Alfred Lawrence Billingham, FSI, Staff for Royal Engineer Services, Chief Inspector of Works, War Office.
- Marguerite Elizabeth Medforth, RRC, Matron-in-Chief, Queen Alexandra's Imperial Military Nursing Service.
- Colonel William Aleck Quennell, MIMechE, Ordnance Mechanical Engineer, 1st Class, Royal Army Ordnance Corps, Assistant Director of Ordnance Services, War Office.
- Lieutenant-Colonel & Brevet Colonel John Willatt Lloyd, MC, late Commander, Royal Engineers, 43rd (Wessex) Division, Territorial Army, now Territorial Army Reserve of Officers.

Royal Air Force

- Wing Commander William Wood Shorten, FRCS(E), LRCP.

Civil Division

- Kate Barratt, DSc, Principal of Swanley Horticultural College, Kent.
- Mabel Maria Clarkson, JP, Lord Mayor of Norwich.
- Walter Palmer Cobbett. For services in connection with the Trustee Savings Bank Association movement. A Trustee of the Manchester Savings Bank.
- Lieutenant-Colonel George Rowlandson Crosfield, DSO, TD, lately Chairman of the British Legion.
- Walton John Hadfield, MInstCE, City Engineer and Surveyor, Sheffield. A pioneer in modern developments of highway engineering and road surfacing.
- Professor Harry Mainwaring Hallsworth, OBE, Chairman of the Newcastle upon Tyne Employment Committee, David Dale Professor of Economics, Armstrong College, University of Durham.
- Thomas Henderson, MP, Member of Parliament for the Tradeston Division of Glasgow since 1922. Comptroller of HM Household since 1929.
- Arthur Sinclair Lupton, Assistant Secretary, Board of Customs and Excise.
- Arthur Herbert Norris, MC, MRCS, LRCP, DPH, Chief Inspector of Reformatory and Industrial Schools, Home Office.
- Richard Francis Malachy Pearson, MICE, Deputy Director of Works & Buildings, Air Ministry.
- George Digby Pepys, MA, Senior Official Receiver, Companies (Winding Up) Department, Board of Trade.
- William Benjamin Taylor, JP, MP, Member of Parliament for South West Norfolk since 1929. A member of the Norfolk County Council since 1910. For public and political services.
- Wilfred Trubshaw, OBE, Chief Constable of Lancashire.
- Major John William Thomson-Glover, OBE, of the Political Department, Political Agent, Dir, Swat & Chitral, North-West Frontier Province.
- Usha Nath Sen, of the Associated Press of India.
- Angus Somerville Fletcher, British Library of Information, New York.
- Hewan Leslie Archdall, Chief Police Magistrate, Brisbane, State of Queensland.
- Ralph Herbert Dawson, MInstT, General Manager of Railways and Takoradi Harbour Authority, Gold Coast.
- Albert Launcelot Hoops, MD, Principal Civil Medical Officer, Straits Settlements.
- Horace Hamilton Hunter, LLD, Unofficial Member of the Legislative Council of the Uganda Protectorate. For public services.
- Alice Werner, DLitt, lately Professor of Bantu languages at the School of Oriental Studies, London.
- Major Henry Harold Wheatley, OBE, MC, Adviser, Ministry of Economics & Communications, Iraq.

Honorary Commander

- Hassan Khalid Pasha Aboul Huda, lately Chief Minister of the Government of Trans-Jordan.

==== Officer of the Order of the British Empire (OBE) ====
Military Division

Royal Navy

- Lieutenant-Commander George Frederick Stevens-Guille.
- Engineer Commander Robin Rampling, DSO.
- Paymaster Commander Theodore Young Dobson, VD, Royal Naval Volunteer Reserve.
- Major John Melville Tuke, Royal Marines.
- Brevet-Major Arthur Reginald Chater, DSO, Royal Marines.

Army

- Captain William Lowry Alston, 1st Bombay Pioneers, Indian Army.
- Captain John Meredith Benoy, 2nd Battalion, The South Staffordshire Regiment.
- Captain (Quarter-Master) Frederick William Brind, 3rd Battalion, Coldstream Guards.
- Major (Quarter-Master) Francis George Bucktin, TD, The Yorkshire Dragoons (Queen's Own), Territorial Army.
- Captain (local Major) Raymond Swinburne Buller, Regular Army Reserve of Officers, Company Commander, Trans-Jordan Frontier Force.
- The Reverend George Aloysius Carlisle, Chaplain to the Forces, 3rd Class, Royal Army Chaplains' Department.
- Lieutenant-Colonel Charles Joseph Coppinger, MB, Royal Army Medical Corps.
- Major William Herschal Dawson, MA, Army Educational Corps.
- Major Hugh Blackwell Layard Dowbiggin, Hong Kong Volunteer Defence Corps.
- Major Harold Fletcher, TD, 44th (Home Counties) Divisional Train, Royal Army Service Corps, Territorial Army.
- Major (local Lieutenant-Colonel) Edward Brian Barkley Hawkins, DSO, The West Yorkshire Regiment (The Prince of Wales's Own), Officer Commanding, 1st (Nyasaland) Battalion, The King's African Rifles.
- Major (Quarter-Master) George Arthur Kent, Royal Corps of Signals.
- Major John MacDougall, TD, retired, late 6th Battalion, The Seaforth Highlanders (Ross-shire Buffs, The Duke of Albany's), Territorial Army.
- Captain Richard Johnstone Mackay, MC, 4th Battalion, 8th Punjab Regiment, Indian Army.
- Honorary Captain Malik Mohammad Khizar Hayat Khan, Indian Land Forces, Indian Army.
- Major Charles Alfred Holmes Montanaro, Ordnance Officer, 3rd Class, Royal Army Ordnance Corps.
- Major (local Lieutenant-Colonel) Reginald Anthony Deane Moseley, The Royal Scots Fusiliers, attached Sudan Defence Force.
- Major Arthur Newton, Special List of Quarter-Masters, Royal Corps of Signals (Indian Army).
- Major Francis Martin Potter, MBE, 12th London Regiment (Rangers), Territorial Army.
- Lieutenant-Colonel William Edward Pownall, Staff for Royal Engineer Services.
- Major Robert Roger Robertson, Officer Commanding, Singapore Volunteer Corps, Straits Settlements Volunteer Force.
- Major (Quarter-Master) George William Henry Howe, retired pay, late The East Surrey Regiment.
- Major James William Western, TD, Royal Corps of Signals, Territorial Army.

Royal Air Force

- Squadron Leader George Frederick Law.
- Flight Lieutenant Herbert William Heslop.
- Flight Lieutenant Frank Woolley, DFC.

Civil Division

- Frederick William Alexander, MRCS, LRCP (Edin.), DPH, formerly Medical Officer of Health for the Bromley & Poplar districts.
- Wilfred Yorke Baldry, Librarian, War Office.
- Major Jack Becke, Chief Constable of Shropshire.
- Geoffrey Frank Braddock, an Assistant Director, Department of Overseas Trade.
- James Charles Brampton, MBE, Principal Clerk, Ministry of Pensions, Representative of the Ministry of Pensions in Canada.
- Edith Gladys Clarke, Principal, National Training School of Cookery & Domestic Science.
- Piers Alexander Currie, Chief Clerk, Legal Division, Ministry of Health
- The Reverend Edmund Dale, MA, DLitt, Headmaster, Latymer Upper School, Hammersmith.
- Alderman William John Esmond, JP, President of the Carmarthen Divisional Labour Party. For public and political services.
- Walter Pearson Fuller, MA, Chairman of the London Headmasters' Employment Committee.
- Atherton Gray, JP, Chairman of the Clackmannan County Education Committee.
- Harold Hadden, FCSI, Chief Property Adviser, Office of the Public Trustee.
- John Hathorn Hall, DSO, MC, Principal, Colonial Office.
- Peter Kydd Hanton, MBE, ARIBA, Senior Architect, HM Office of Works.
- The Very Reverend Joseph Brewer Jobberns, MA, Dean of Brechin, Chairman of the Angus War Pensions Committee.
- John Clague Joughin, MBE, Manager, Constructive Department, HM Dockyard, Portsmouth.
- Thomas Kelly Liddell, Chief Conciliation Officer, North Western Division, Ministry of Labour.
- William Thomas Matthews, MBE, Principal, HM Treasury.
- Charles Middleton, Chief Constable of Stirlingshire.
- Captain Ernest William O'Connor, DSC, Senior Captain, Sea Transport Service of the Board of Trade.
- Grace Owen, MEd, Joint Honorary Secretary of the Nursery School Association of Great Britain.
- Evelyn Maud Pennefather. For public services in Kensington. Chairman of the House Committee of the Princess Louise Kensington Hospital for Children.
- Thomas Rogers, JP, first President of the Wednesbury, Tipton & Darlaston Labour Party in 1918. For public, political and social services.
- John Ashwell Stirling, Secretary, Export Credits Guarantee Department.
- Julia Varley, a member of the Work-people's Panel of the Birmingham Court of Referees and a member of the Birmingham Employment Committee. For public services.
- Harold Decimus Vigor, MBE, Principal, Ministry of Agriculture & Fisheries.
- William James Ward, Deputy Commissioner of Valuation, Ministry of Finance, Northern Ireland.
- George Herbert Whybrow, Principal Clerk, Board of Inland Revenue.
- Thomas Marley Wood, Assistant Controller, Post Office Savings Bank Department.
- William Henry James Cole, British Vice-Consul at Buffalo.
- Wentworth Martyn Gurney, His Majesty's Consul at Lima.
- George Bernard Humphreys, Compensation Officer, Egyptian Labour Corps, Egyptian Ministry of Finance.
- Captain Erskine Knollys, MC, District Commissioner, Sudan Political Service.
- Eric Denholm Pridie, DSO, Medical Inspector, Sudan Medical Service.
- Norman Vorley, Acting British Vice-Consul at Oslo.
- Alice Caroline Franklin, formerly Secretary, Society for the Oversea Settlement of British Women.
- Robert McFarlane, Member of the European Advisory Council, Bechuanaland Protectorate.
- Allister Mitchell Miller, Member of the European Advisory Council, Swaziland.
- Frederick William James Moore, Member of the Fruits Committee of the Empire Marketing Board.
- The Honourable John Nicholson, Member of the Legislative Council, State of Western Australia. For public services in that State.
- Khan Bahadur, Haji Amirali Lahori, Zamindar and President of Larkana Municipality, Bombay.
- Edmund Mowbray Atkinson, Tutor and Guardian to His Highness the Raja of Faridkot, Punjab States.
- Captain Robert Richardson Burnett, of the Political Department, Secretary to the Agent to the Governor-General in Baluchistan.
- Khan Bahadur Shams-ud-din Haidar, Bihar & Orissa Civil Service, District Magistrate and Collector, Bihar & Orissa.
- Robert Hume, Indian Police Service, District Superintendent of Police, Madras.
- Khan Bahadur Khan Hamidullah Khan, Indian Police Service, Superintendent of Police, Punjab.
- Major Ronald Stuart Moberly, VD, 1st Battalion, The Great Indian Peninsula Railway Regiment, Auxiliary Force, Bombay.
- Lucien Arthur Allen, British Adviser, Perlis, Malay States.
- George Bonner, Member of the Executive Council of the Falkland Islands. For public services.
- Captain Alexander Thomas Gammon, MBE, General Secretary of the Ceylon Branch of the Comrades of the Great War.
- The Venerable Archdeacon Arthur George Bernard Glossop, MA, Universities' Mission to Central Africa. For services in the Nyasaland Protectorate.
- Albert Montefiore Hyamson, Chief Immigration Officer, Palestine.
- Tyabali Mulla Jeevanje. For services to Kenya.
- Alfred Clarence Norman, MD, Director of the X-Ray & Electrical Institute, Baghdad, Iraq.
- Hugh Morgan O'Byrne, Chief of Customs, Somaliland Protectorate.
- Basil Demetrius Sertsios, Puisne Judge, Supreme Court, Cyprus.
- Mabel Shaw, of the Mbereshi Mission of the London Missionary Society. For services in Northern Rhodesia.
- Herbert Sandford Thorne, lately Police Magistrate, Barbados.
- Reginald Acheson Webb, Engineer, Lagos Town Council, Nigeria.
- Wilfred Murray Wigley, Crown Attorney and Magistrate, Presidency of Saint Christopher and Nevis, Leeward Islands.

==== Member of the Order of the British Empire (MBE) ====
Military Division

Royal Navy

- Telegraphist Lieutenant-Commander Harry Simpson.
- Lieutenant (E) Henry Richard George Brooking.
- Wardmaster Lieutenant Reginald Francis, MSM.
- Lieutenant Richard Frank Cornwall, Royal Marines.
- Commissioned Royal Marine Gunner Harry Pearcy, Royal Marines.

Army

- Warrant Officer Class I, Sergeant-Major Hugh Baker, Royal Army Medical Corps.
- Captain (Deputy Commissary) William John Ball, Indian Corps of Clerks, Indian Army.
- Warrant Officer Class I, Regimental Sergeant-Major Thomas Edward Brewer, 1st Battalion, The Wiltshire Regiment.
- Sergeant (acting Battery Sergeant-Major), Harold Gilbert Brooke, Royal Artillery, attached 54th (West Riding & Staffordshire) Medium Brigade, Royal Artillery, Territorial Army.
- Warrant Officer Class II, Staff Quartermaster-Sergeant (acting Conductor), Edwin William Buffee, Royal Army Ordnance Corps, Territorial Army.
- Warrant Officer Class II, Regimental Quartermaster-Sergeant Fred Butterworth, 6th Battalion, The Lancashire Fusiliers, Territorial Army.
- Warrant Officer Class I, Sergeant-Major, William John Carter, Royal Army Medical Corps.
- Warrant Officer Class I, Regimental Sergeant-Major, William Cook, late Royal Army Ordnance Corps.
- Warrant Officer Class I, Superintending Clerk, Harry Cooke, Grenadier Guards.
- Warrant Officer Class I, Staff Sergeant-Major, George Cressell, Royal Army Service Corps.
- Lieutenant (Senior Assistant Surgeon) Alexander Nicol deGruyther, Indian Medical Department.
- Lieutenant (Senior Assistant Surgeon) James Berchmans D'Souza, Indian Medical Department.
- Company Sergeant-Major Robert John Everest, Hong Kong Volunteer Defence Corps.
- Warrant Officer Class I, Superintending Clerk, William Henry Finch, Royal Engineers.
- Warrant Officer Class II, Quartermaster-Sergeant, George Henry Rogers Flynn, Royal Corps of Signals.
- Warrant Officer Class I, Regimental Sergeant-Major, William George Gingell, MM, 1st Battalion, The East Surrey Regiment.
- Lieutenant (Quarter-Master) Fred Josiah Godfrey, DCM, 4th/5th Battalion, The Duke of Cornwall's Light Infantry, Territorial Army.
- Conductor Percy William Godfrey, Military Engineer Services (Barrack Department), Indian Army.
- Conductor Albert Henry Heath, Indian Miscellaneous List, Indian Army.
- Warrant Officer Class I, Sergeant-Major Artillery Clerk, Arthur James Sheaf Hinton, Royal Artillery.
- Warrant Officer Class I, 1st Class Staff Sergeant-Major, Charles Ernest Ivory, Royal Army Service Corps.
- Warrant Officer Class II, Battery Sergeant-Major, Donald Wilson James, MC, 229th Battery, 58th (Essex & Suffolk) Medium Brigade, Royal Artillery, Territorial Army.
- Warrant Officer Class I, Sergeant-Major, Charles Victor Jefford, Royal Army Medical Corps.
- Captain (Quarter-Master) James Henry Keech, MC, The East Yorkshire Regiment.
- Warrant Officer Class I, Mechanist Sergeant-Major, Sidney Edward Kennett, Royal Tank Corps.
- Warrant Officer Class II, Company Sergeant-Major, Ernest Frederick King, The Middlesex Regiment (Duke of Cambridge's Own), attached Sudan Defence Force.
- Warrant Officer Class II, Regimental Quartermaster-Sergeant, William Wormall King, 11th London Regiment (Finsbury Rifles), Territorial Army.
- Lieutenant (acting Captain) Koh Keng Bock, Officer Commanding, Chinese Company, Malacca Volunteer Corps, Straits Settlements Volunteer Force.
- Warrant Officer Class II, Squadron Sergeant-Major (acting Regimental Sergeant-Major), John Forbes Lorimer, The Northumberland Hussars, Territorial Army.
- Conductor Robert Love, Indian Corps of Clerks (British Wing), Indian Army.
- Lieutenant (Quarter-Master) Harold Percy Martin, Coldstream Guards.
- Warrant Officer Class II, Quartermaster-Sergeant, Martin Thomas McDonald, 2nd Battalion, Royal Tank Corps.
- Captain (Quarter-Master) Norman McIver, 4th Battalion, The Queen's Own Cameron Highlanders, Territorial Army.
- Warrant Officer Class I, Regimental Sergeant-Major, David Miller, DCM, 2nd Battalion, The Royal Ulster Rifles.
- Warrant Officer Class I, Regimental Sergeant-Major, Henry Patrick Munson, 2nd Battalion, The Bedfordshire and Hertfordshire Regiment.
- Sergeant (local Company Sergeant-Major) Henry George Norton, The Royal Inniskilling Fusiliers, attached Iraq Levies.
- Warrant Officer Class II, Quartermaster-Sergeant, George Henry Peach, late The Royal Sussex Regiment.
- Captain John Arthur Pring, Indian Army Service Corps.
- Warrant Officer Class II, Company-Sergeant-Major (acting Regimental Sergeant-Major), Harry Pugh, DCM, The King's Regiment (Liverpool), attached 17th Battalion, The King's Regiment (Liverpool), Territorial Army.
- Lieutenant (Quarter-Master) Hugh Rennie, 4th Battalion, The Gordon Highlanders, Territorial Army.
- Warrant Officer Class I, Regimental Sergeant-Major Arthur Frederick Ruth, Depot, The Royal Scots Fusiliers.
- Captain Richard Shrive, MC, Royal Artillery.
- Warrant Officer Class I, Bandmaster, Henry William Simpson, Royal Artillery.
- Lieutenant (Assistant Commissary) David Stobie, Military Engineer Services (Barrack Department), Indian Army.
- Conductor David Summerfield, Indian Corps of Clerks (British Wing), Indian Army.
- Warrant Officer Class II, Quartermaster-Sergeant (temporary Warrant Officer Class I, Sergeant-Major), Albert Edward Taylor, Royal Army Medical Corps.
- Captain (Quarter-Master) Fred Taylor, 4th Battalion, The Green Howards (Alexandra, Princess of Wales's Own Yorkshire Regiment), Territorial Army.
- Warrant Officer Class I, Staff Sergeant-Major, William Jamieson Turner, Royal Army Service Corps.
- Warrant Officer Class II, Company Sergeant-Major, Douglas Grout Whisstock, 4th Battalion, The Suffolk Regiment, Territorial Army.

Royal Air Force

- Flight Lieutenant Frederick Ernest Bishop.
- 1st Class Assistant Surgeon Richard Campbell Gale, Indian Medical Service (attached Iraq Levies).
- No. 1382 Sergeant-Major, 1st Class, Glendor Godfrey Nicholas Marshall.
- No. 202144 Sergeant-Major, 1st Class, James William Dunk.

Civil Division

- Gladys Martin Allen, Chief Superintendent of Typists, HM Office of Works.
- Lucy Sarah Begg, lately Matron of the Home for Incurables, Putney. Previously Matron of the Cancer Wing, Middlesex Hospital.
- John Berry, Superintendent of Messengers, Prime Minister's Office.
- James Walter Blyth, Superintendent, London Postal Service.
- James Brames, Waterguard Superintendent First Class, Board of Customs & Excise.
- William Fred Brown, Superintendent, Metropolitan Police (Criminal Investigation Department).
- Captain Cornelius Carmody, Honorary Secretary of the National Association for the Employment of Ex-Soldiers, Sailors & Airmen, Manchester.
- Norman John Wilding Cole, Chairman of the Folkestone, Ashford & District War Pensions Committee.
- Frederick John Coleman, Staff Officer, Mines Department, Board of Trade.
- Annie Mary Davies, Honorary Secretary to the North Wales Nursing Association.
- Alys Mary Ealand, MA, JP, Chairman of the Bath Juvenile Advisory Committee.
- James Forrester, Commander, Metropolitan Special Constabulary.
- Alexander Fraser, Superintendent and Deputy Chief Constable, Dumbartonshire Constabulary.
- John George, Superintendent and Deputy Chief Constable, Berwickshire Constabulary.
- Cecil William Goldsmith, Staff Clerk, War Office.
- Henry William Hobbs, Examiner, Estate Duty Office, Board of Inland Revenue.
- Alderman Luke Hogan, JP, Vice-Chairman of the Liverpool Employment Committee.
- Joseph Paxton Humphery, FSIA, Chief Sanitary Inspector Borough of Reigate and Honorary Secretary of the Sanitary Inspectors' Association.
- John Preston Hytch, Chief Clerk of the Birmingham County Court.
- William Edward Jones, Auditor of Accounts, County Courts Branch, Lord Chancellor's Department.
- Harry Edwin Joyce, Engineering Clerk of Works to the Prison Commission, Home Office.
- William Wilson Kelso, Chief Sanitary Inspector for Paisley, and the Senior Chief Inspector in Scotland.
- Gertrude Leeson, Chairman of the Children's Sub-Committee of the Birkenhead, Wallasey, Wirrall & District War Pensions Committee.
- David McNally, lately Director of the Information Bureau of the Edinburgh Education Committee.
- John Dunbar McQuiston, Higher Executive Officer, Ministry of Labour, Northern Ireland.
- Maude Leslie Martin, RRC, Matron, Queen Alexandra Hospital (Ministry of Pensions), Cosham, Hampshire.
- Emily Louise Mason, Supervisor, London Postal Service.
- Sarah Ellen Morris, Superintendent of the Lincolnshire County Nursing Association, and Inspector of Midwives.
- Walter Philip Kerr Neale, Private Secretary to the Permanent Secretary to the Ministry of Transport.
- John Elliott Nichols, Accountant, Board of Trade.
- Janet Campbell Papple, formerly Teacher of Domestic Subjects, Hampshire.
- Hannah Mary Parkin, Headmistress, Drummond Road Girls' Modern School, Bradford.
- George William Pierce, Headmaster, Owslebury Council School, Hampshire.
- Trevor Lyons Relton, Senior Intelligence Officer, Department of Overseas Trade.
- Martha Maria Roberts, Matron of the Walton Institution, Liverpool.
- Thomas James Scanlan, Ex-Soldier Clerk, Grade A, War Office.
- Robert John Sim, Sub-Office Postmaster, Lossiemouth.
- Magdalene Glass Stenhouse, Clerical Assistant, Prime Minister's Office.
- John Alfred Stockwell, Chief Visiting Inspector, Contract & Purchase Department, Admiralty.
- Edward Twist, Architect, Works Division, Ministry of Finance, Northern Ireland.
- Arthur Jonas Watts, Principal Clerk, Ministry of Pensions.
- Margaret Florence West, Higher Clerical Officer, Foreign Office.
- Constance Wroughton, Chief Superintendent of Typists, Dominions Office and Colonial Office.
- George Barnett, Superintendent of the Civil Veterinary Hospital at Khartoum.
- Paymaster Lieutenant-Commander Howard Stanley Bradbrook, RD, Royal Naval Reserve, British Vice-Consul at Boulogne.
- Joseph Augustine Catoni, British Vice-Consul at Alexandretta.
- George Darling. For services on the occasion of the loss of the R101.
- Margherita Ashton Johnson, Assistant to the Commercial Secretary at His Majesty's Legation at Bern.
- Thomas Joseph Francis Kenny, Archivist at His Majesty's Embassy at Rio de Janeiro.
- Donald Neil MacDiarmid, Missionary, United Mission, Egypt.
- James Wilson Robertson, Assistant District Commissioner, Sudan Political Service.
- Benjamin John Grove Wishlade, Administrative Official, European Department, Egyptian Ministry of the Interior.
- Elinor Maud Must, Punjab Educational Service, Principal, Lady Maclagan High and Normal School for Girls, Lahore, Punjab.
- John Ernest Baker, Engineer-in-charge, Water Works, Jaipur State, Rajputana.
- Rodney Thomas Baldwin, Registrar, Political and Appointment Departments, Bihar & Orissa Secretariat.
- Sardar Bahadur Subadar-Major Ganesh Bahadur Chettri, Eastern Frontier Rifles (Bengal Battalion), Dacca, Bengal.
- Arthur Ferdinand Clarke, Bombay Police Service, Deputy Superintendent of Police, Sholapur, Bombay.
- William Francis Alfred Hamilton, Indian Police Service, Assistant District Superintendent of Police, Madras.
- Captain George Douglas Hoskins, IARO, Bengal Excise Service, Superintendent of Excise & Salt, Midnapore, Bengal.
- Anthony Isar, City Magistrate, Delhi.
- Denis Charles Reiley Jones, Burma Police Service, Deputy-Superintendent of Police, Headquarters Assistant, Pegu, Burma.
- Khan Mohammad Khan, Bahadur, IOM, Major in the Khairpur State Forces, Commanding the State Forces.
- Shivram Wamanji Patil, JP, Medical Practitioner, Bombay.
- Wilton Garnet Albury, Inspector and General Superintendent of Schools, Bahamas.
- Barbara Geddes Allardes, Senior Health Visitor, Tanganyika Territory.
- Emily Jane Baskett, Headmistress of the Bishop's High School, Georgetown, British Guiana.
- Captain Conrad William Kerr Bovell, Superintendent of Police, Uganda Protectorate.
- Jocelyn Maingard, Medical Officer, Mauritius. For services in the relief of sufferers from the recent hurricane.
- Captain Charles Campbell Metcalfe, MC, Chief Transport Officer, Nyasaland Protectorate.
- Roger Pilot, Medical Officer, Mauritius. For services in the relief of sufferers from the recent hurricane.
- Frances Mary Plant, Matron, Dar es Salaam Hospital, Tanganyika Territory.
- Tiruvilingam Sathasivam, Director of the Manipay Hindu College, Ceylon. For educational and other social services.
- Caesar Shellish, Local Commandant of Police, Cyprus.
- Herbert Thompson, Postmaster, Northern Rhodesia.
- Claude Emile Wright, Unofficial Member of the Legislative Council of Sierra Leone.

Honorary Members

- Zahi Haddad, Medical Officer of Health, Haifa, Palestine.
- Siegfried Hoofien, President of the Chamber of Commerce of Jaffa & District, Palestine.

=== Medal of the Order of the British Empire ===
Military Division

Royal Navy

- Leonard Arthur Leslie Reid, Chief Petty Officer Writer O.N. C/M 36823 (HMS Triad).
- Raymond Arthur Johnson, Telegraphist, O.N. P/J 49346 (HMS Courageous).

Army

- No. S/3148 Staff-Sergeant Frank Victor Francis, Royal Army Service Corps.
- No. 67 Havildar Gagan Sing Thapa, 1st Battalion, 2nd King Edward's Own Gurkha Rifles (The Sirmoor Rifles), Indian Army.
- No. 1037977 Gunner (local Lance-Sergeant) Francis Maguire, 10th Field Brigade, Royal Artillery.
- No. 4236 Private Saidi bin Bakari, 2nd Battalion, The King's African Rifles.
- No. 2209274 Sergeant Walter Sayers, MM, 44th (Home Counties) Divisional Royal Engineers, Territorial Army.
- No. 2368 Gunner Sher Hussain, Hong Kong-Singapore Brigade, Royal Artillery.

Royal Air Force

- No. 364636 Corporal George William Emehy.
- No. 365191 Corporal Robert Fairfax Lucy.
- No. 510375 Aircraftman, 2nd Class, Charles Marsh.

Civil Division

For Gallantry

- Reginald Rimmer, Sergeant, Police, Bombay, India. Sergeant Rimmer has shown on numerous occasions great courage and coolness. This officer's pluck and presence of mind have evoked the highest praise from his superiors, and he has consistently set a fine example to the Constabulary under him.
- Joseph Baptista, Excise Constable, Sholapur District, Bombay, India. This Constable was Orderly to the Excise Sub-Inspector, Sholapur, when during the riots in May, 1930, both the Sub-Inspector and the Constable were completely surrounded by the mob, severely beaten and stoned. The Constable, although ordered by the Sub-Inspector to seek safety refused to leave his post and protected the Sub-Inspector who had been rendered unconscious. He stood by the Sub-Inspector continually blowing his whistle till police help arrived. His devotion to duty in the face of great danger undoubtedly saved the life of the Sub-Inspector.
- Ghulam Mohirud-Din, Sub-Inspector of Police, Punjab, India. This officer, who has enjoyed a reputation for energy, courage, and strength of character throughout his seventeen years' service as a Sub-Inspector, has been called upon, since the inception of the civil disobedience campaign, to deal with many very dangerous situations arising from the presence of large and hostile crowds. On several occasions, while behaving with commendable restraint, he has taken grave risks and he has never been deterred from such steps as were necessary to maintain law and order and the prestige of Government.

For Meritorious Service

- Robert Burley Brook, Gardener and Caretaker, Imperial War Graves Commission, France.
- Joseph Alfred Gee, Inspector, West Riding Constabulary.
- William Heffernan, Sergeant, No. 1399, Royal Ulster Constabulary.
- James Joseph Hemmings, Office Keeper, HM Land Registry.
- James Bracken Leighton, Chief Officer in the Prison Service.
- Joseph Ludgate, Inspector, Metropolitan Special Constabulary.
- Harry Oakes, Foreman of Works in the Prison Service.
- Henry Palmer, Office Keeper, War Office.
- Albert John Saunders, DSM, Supervising Messenger, Air Ministry.
- Herbert Newton Kelrock Stewart, Inspector of Police, Jubbulpore, Central Provinces, India.
- Marie Frederica Walwyn, Nurse in the Alexandra Hospital, Nevis, Leeward Islands.
- Lala Diwan Chand, Inspector of Police, Punjab, India.
- Ravishankar Chhaganlal, Inspector of Police, Western India States Agency.
- Rai Sahib Subedar Mahabir Singh, Honorary Secretary, District Soldiers' Board, Unao, United Provinces, India.

=== Appointments & Promotions ===
Honorary Captain

- 2nd Lieutenant Ladislao Zavertal, MVO, retired pay, late Bandmaster, Royal Artillery.

=== Companion of the Imperial Service Order (ISO) ===
Home Civil Service

- Alfred John Daniel, Chief Ship Surveyor, Board of Trade.
- Robert Charles Dickie, OBE, Technical Assistant, Consular Department, Foreign Office.
- John Pearce Hancock, Inspector of Taxes, Higher Grade, Board of Inland Revenue.
- Clarence Oldham Hanson, MBE, Divisional Officer, Forestry Commission.
- Charles Henry Hunt, MBE, Clerk in Charge of Accounts, Department of HM Procurator General and Treasury Solicitor.
- William Henry Moorby, MSc, MICE, Assistant Civil Engineer-in-Chief, Admiralty.
- John Robert Phillips, OBE, Director of Accounts, National Savings Committee.
- Alexander Rae, Senior Depute Clerk, High Court of Justiciary, Edinburgh.
- Patrick Riordan, MBE, Superintendent of the Registry, Ministry of Agriculture & Fisheries.
- William Francis Shinn, Divisional Inspector, Outdoor Insurance Inspectorate, Ministry of Health.
- Arthur Sirett, Postmaster-Surveyor of Sheffield.

Dominions

- Edward Alexander Ernest Cullen, MICE, Chief Engineer, Department of Harbours & Marine, State of Queensland.
- Charles Berkeley Rushton, Secretary, Office of the Agent-General in London for the State of Western Australia.
- George William Simpson, Public Service Commissioner, State of Western Australia.

Indian Civil Services

- M. R. Ry. Diwan Bahadur Aaron Appadurai Pillai Avargal, Madras Civil Service, Director of Industries, Madras.
- Kenneth Cyril Woodward Brown, Senior Judgment Writer and Secretary to the Chief Justice of the High Court of Judicature at Patna, Bihar & Orissa.
- Allan Grant, Chief Inspector of Offices, United Provinces.
- Major Edward Francis Hottinger, LMSSA (London), Indian Medical Department, Civil Surgeon, Punjab.
- Ralph Noel McMorran, Registrar, Office of the Chief Commissioner, North-West Frontier Province.
- Stephen Pereira, Senior Stenographer, Special Duty Branch, Finance Department, Government of India.
- Ghulam Rasool, Indian Corps of Clerks (Indian Wing), Superintendent, Medical Branch, Headquarters, Northern Command.
- Jyotish Chandra Ray, Personal Assistant to the Director of Agriculture, Bengal.
- Albert Edward Smith, Stenographer and Confidential Clerk to His Excellency the Governor of Burma.
- Rao Bahadur Raghunathrao Narayan Tawde, Bombay Police Service, Divisional Superintendent, City Police, Bombay.

Colonies, Protectorates, &c.

- Bahadur Ressaider Haji Haroun Ali, lately Native Officer and Head Interpreter, attached to the Somaliland Camel Corps, King's African Rifles.
- Captain Herbert Alfred Anderson, Commissioner of Police, Kelantan, Malay States.
- Duncan Hamilton Hall, Second Assistant Colonial Secretary and Clerk to the Privy Council, Jamaica.
- Herbert Allan Otway, Commissioner of the Carriacou District, Grenada, Windward Islands.
- Lorens Arthur Prins, Inspecting Medical Officer, Ceylon.
- John Brooke Scrivenor, Director, Geological Survey, Federated Malay States.
- George William Sturgess, MRCVS, Government Veterinary Surgeon, Ceylon.
- Frank Vardon, lately Registrar, Divisional Court, Sekondi, Gold Coast.
- James Rogers Wright, Master and Registrar of the Supreme Court, Sierra Leone.

=== Imperial Service Medal ===
- Shaik Roshan Ali, Jemadar, Chief Secretary's Office, Government of Bengal.
- Nihu Angami, lately Head Interpreter, Naga Hills, Assam.
- Thakar Das, Head Orderly to the Deputy Commissioner, Amritsar, Punjab.
- Luqman Khan, late Head Orderly to the Deputy Commissioner, Multan, Punjab.

=== Order of the Companions of Honour (CH) ===
- Albert Mansbridge, MA, LLD. For services in connection with modern Adult Education.
- Benjamin Seebohm Rowntree, JP, For social services.

=== Kaisar-i-Hind Medal ===
- Gertrude Beckett, Chief Lady Superintendent of the Lady Minto Indian Nursing Association.
- Audrey Chitty, Honorary General Secretary, All-India Girl Guides Association.
- Rachel Edith Howard, Principal, Sarah Tucker College for Girls, Palamcottah, Madras.
- Sister Lois Eliza Mary Hudson, Superintendent, St. Michael's English High School, Maymyo, Burma.
- Hilda Keane, MD, Medical Superintendent, Victoria Zenana Hospital, Delhi.
- Her Highness The Dowager Maharani Kamal Kunwar, of Ajaigarh, Central India.
- Adelaide Woodard, Doctor-in-Charge American Presbyterian Memorial Hospital, Fatehgarh, United Provinces.
- Ian Ross Anderson, Medical Officer-in-Charge of the Kalna Mission Hospital of the United Scottish Churches Mission, Bengal.
- Rai Bahadur Captain Ram Rakha Mai Bhandari, Barrister-at-Law, Public Prosecutor and Honorary Secretary, St. John Ambulance Association, Punjab Centre, Punjab.
- Henry Herbert Strutton, Missionary, lately Acting Criminal Tribes Settlement Officer, Bombay.

==== Bar to the Kaisar-i-Hind Medal ====
- Henry Tristram Holland, CIE, MB, FRCS, Church Mission Society, Quetta, Baluchistan.

=== Edward Medal ===
- George Herbert Frank, in recognition of gallant conduct on the occasion of an explosion which occurred at Castleford on 4 July 1930.

=== King's Police Medal (KPM) ===
- George Douglas Horsman, Chief Officer of the Castleford Fire Brigade, in recognition of gallant conduct on the occasion of an explosion which occurred at Castleford on 4 July 1930.
- John Reginald Hornby Nott-Bower, Special Superintendent of Police, Indian Police Service.
- Thakur Bisheshwar Singh, Deputy Superintendent of Police, United Provinces Police.

=== Air Force Cross (AFC) ===
- Squadron Leader Hubert Wilson Godfrey Jones Penderel, MC.
- Flight Lieutenant James Ramage Addams.

=== Air Force Medal (AFM) ===
- 912 Flight Sergeant (Pilot) Henry Thomas Inglis.
- 349707 Sergeant (Pilot) Charles Tompkins.

=== Royal Red Cross (RRC) ===
First Class

- Maggie Moddrel, Matron, Princess Mary's Royal Air Force Nursing Service. In recognition of exceptional devotion and competency displayed in Royal Air Force hospitals.

Second Class

- Dorothy Vincent Mansell, Sister, Princess Mary's Royal Air Force Nursing Service. In recognition of special devotion and competency displayed in the nursing and care of the sick in Princess Mary's Royal Air Force Hospital, Halton, during the recent outbreak of cerebro-spinal meningitis.
