= 1942 New Year Honours =

British royal recognitions

The 1942 New Year Honours were appointments by King George VI to various orders and honours to reward and highlight good works by citizens of the United Kingdom and British Empire. They were announced on 30 December 1941.

The recipients of honours are displayed here as they were styled before their new honour.

== United Kingdom and British Empire ==
=== Baron ===
- The Right Honourable Sir (Albert) Charles Clauson, C.B.E., a Judge of the High Court. 1926–38. A Lord Justice of Appeal, 1938–41.
- Brigadier-General The Right Honourable Sir Auckland Campbell Geddes, G.C.M.G., K.C.B., T.D., M.D., LL.D. For public services.

=== Baronet ===
- Commander Sir Charles Worthington Craven, O.B.E., R.N. (Retd.), Controller General, Ministry of Aircraft Production, chairman and managing director, Vickers-Armstrongs, Limited.
- Sir Ralph Lewis Wedgwood, C.B., C.M.G., lately Chairman of the Railway Executive Committee.

=== Knight Bachelor ===
- Alderman Frank Samuel Alexander, lately Sheriff of the City of London, Chairman of the Baltic Mercantile and Shipping Exchange Limited.
- Richard William Allen, Esq., C.B.E., J.P., D.L., Chairman of Messrs W.H. Allen Sons and Company Limited.
- Gilbert Archer, Esq. For public services, Civil Defence Commissioner for the South Eastern District of Scotland.
- George Aylwen, Esq., Treasurer of St Bartholomew's Hospital.
- Horace Louis Petit Boot, Esq., M.Inst.C.E., lately Sheriff of the City of London. Chairman and managing director of Horace Boot and Partners Limited and Eastwoods Limited.
- Henry Francis Brand, Esq., President of the British Employers' Confederation.
- Lieutenant-Colonel Frank Brook, D.S.O., M.C., H.M. Inspector of Constabulary.
- George Mowlem Burt, Esq., Chairman of Messrs John Mowlem and Company, Limited.
- Alderman William Bramwell Cartwright, J.P., Chairman of the West Riding County Council and of the West Riding Emergency Committee.
- Frederick Charles Cook, Esq., C.B., D.S.O., M.C., M.Inst.C.E., Chief Engineer, Highways, Ministry of War Transport.
- Colonel Jonathan Roberts Davidson. C.M.G., M.Inst.C.E., lately Chief Engineer, Metropolitan Water Board.
- Samuel Gurney-Dixon, Esq., M.D., M.R.C.S., L.R.C.P., J.P., Chairman of the Hampshire Education Committee and Chairman of the Education Committee of the County Councils Association.
- George Tristram Edwards, Esq,. Chairman of the Ship Repairers' Central Council.
- Alfred Hubert Roy Fedden, Esq., M.B.E., D.Sc., F.R.Ae.S., Chief Engineer, Bristol Aeroplane Company, Limited.
- John Fisher, Esq., Director of Coastal and Short Sea Shipping, Ministry of War Transport.
- Thomas Dalkin Harrison, Esq., Solicitor and Legal Adviser, Ministry of Health.
- Hubert Douglas Henderson, Esq., Member of the Chancellor of the Exchequer's Consultative Council.
- Robert Stuart Hilton, Esq., O.B.E., Deputy Chairman of the United Steel Companies, Limited. President of the British Iron and Steel Federation.
- Arthur Lawrence Hobhouse, Esq., J.P., Chairman of the Somerset County Council.
- Professor Bennett Melvill Jones, C.B.E., A.F.C., F.R.S., Professor of Aeronautical Engineering, Cambridge University. For services to aircraft development.
- Guy Harold Locock, Esq., C.M.G., Director, Federation of British Industries.
- Percy Herbert Mills, Esq., Controller-General of Machine Tools, Ministry of Supply.
- Sydney Oswald Nevile, Esq. For services to the State Management Scheme.
- George Riddle, Esq., C.B.E., Director of the Co-Operative Wholesale Society.
- William James Rook, Esq., Director of Sugar, Ministry of Food.
- Percy Joseph Sillitoe, Esq., C.B.E., Chief Constable, City of Glasgow Police Force.
- George Clemens Usher, Esq., Director-General of Tank Supply, Ministry of Supply.
- Bertrand Watson, Esq., Chief Magistrate of the Police Courts of the Metropolis.

Dominions

- Arthur George Barrett, Esq., lately Lord Mayor of the City of Adelaide, State of South Australia.
- The Honourable William Flood Webb, Chief Justice of the Supreme Court, State of Queensland.

India

- Rajivaranjan Prashad Sinha, Esq., President, Bihar Legislative Council, Bihar.
- Bertie Munro Staig, Esq., C.S.I., Indian Civil Service, lately Financial Commissioner, Railways.
- Ahmed Fazlur Rahman, Esq., LL.D.. Member. Federal Public Service Commission.
- Major-General Frederick Gwatkin, C.B., D.S.O., M.C., Indian Army, Military Adviser-in-Chief, Indian States Forces.
- Shantidas Askuran, Esq., Member of the Council of State.
- Cattamanchi Ramalinga Reddy, Esq., Member of the Legislative Council, Vice-Chancellor, Andhra University, Waltair, Madras.
- Hugh Arbuthnot Inglis, Esq., Indian Police, Inspector-General of Police, United Provinces.
- Ratanji Dinshaw Dalal, Esq., C.I.E., L.R.C.P. (Lond.), & D.P.H. (Lond.), Member of the Central Legislative Assembly.
- Harold Matthew Glover, Esq., Indian Forest Service, Chief Conservator of Forests, Punjab.
- Khan Bahadur Nawab Fazal Ali, O.B.E., Landlord and Member of the Legislative Assembly, Gujrat, Punjab.
- Sidney Turner, Esq., C.B.E., F.I.A., Accountant-General and Controller of Pension Funds, India Office.
- Rao Bahadur Tiruvadi Sambasivaiyer Venktaraman, C.I.E., Indian Agricultural Service, Sugarcane Expert, Imperial Sugarcane-breeding Station, Coimbatore.
- Khan Bahadur Kavasji Hormusji Katrak, O.B.E., Merchant and Landlord, Sind.
- Chunilal Bhaichand Mehta, Esq., Merchant, Bombay.
- George Bond Morton, Esq., O.B.E., Partner, Messrs. Bird & Co., Calcutta, Bengal.
- Raghunath Purshottam Paranjpye, Esq., Poona, Bombay.

Burma

- U Maung Gyee, Barrister-at-Law. Counsellor to the Governor of Burma.

Colonies, Protectorates, etc.

- Chalinor Grenville Alabaster, Esq., O.B.E., Colonial Legal Service, Attorney-General, Hong Kong.
- John Curtois Howard, Esq., Colonial Legal Service, Chief Justice, Ceylon.
- George Ernest London, Esq., C.M.G., Colonial Administrative Service, Colonial Secretary, Gold Coast.
- Walter Kingsbury Moore, Esq., C.B.E. For public services in the Bahama Islands.
- Gilbert Cochrane Wainwright, Esq., O.B.E. For public services in Jamaica.

=== The Most Honourable Order of the Bath ===
==== Knight Grand Cross of the Order of the Bath (GCB) ====
- Field-Marshal Sir John Greer Dill, K.C.B., C.M.G., D.S.O., Colonel, The Lancashire Regiment
- Sir Frank Edward Smith, G.B.E., K.C.B., D.Sc., LL.D., Controller of Telecommunications Equipment. For services to the Ministry of Aircraft Production and to the Ministry of Supply.

==== Knight Commander of the Order of the Bath (KCB) ====
- Vice-Admiral Sir Wilbraham Tennyson Randle Ford, K.B.E., C.B.
- Vice-Admiral Ralph Leatham, C.B.
- Lieutenant-General the Honourable Harold Rupert Leofric George Alexander, C.B., C.S.I., D.S.O., M.C., late Irish Guards, Colonel, 3/2nd Punjab Regiment.
- Lieutenant-General Thomas Sheridan Riddell-Webster, C.B., D.S.O., late The Cameronians (Scottish Rifles).
- Lieutenant-General Bernard Charles Tolver Paget, C.B., D.S.O., M.C., late The Oxfordshire and Buckinghamshire Light Infantry.
- Lieutenant-General Sir Thomas Albert Blamey, Kt., C.B., C.M.G., D.S.O., Australian Military Forces.
- Honorary Colonel John Cavendish, Viscount Cobham, C.B., T.D., President, Territorial Army Association of the County of Worcester.
- Air Marshal Arthur William Tedder, C.B.
- Sir (Crawfurd) Wilfrid Griffin Eady, K.B.E., C.B., C.M.G., chairman, Board of Customs and Excise.
- Sir Henry Leon French, K.B.E., C.B., Permanent Secretary, Ministry of Food.

==== Companion of the Order of the Bath (CB) ====
Military Division

- Rear-Admiral Cyril Gordon Sedgwick (Retired).
- Rear-Admiral Francis Hugh Walter (Retired).
- Rear-Admiral Cosmo Moray Graham (Retired).
- Rear-Admiral Douglas Adams Budgen (Retired).
- Engineer Rear-Admiral Frederick Richard Gordon Turner, O.B.E.
- Temporary Surgeon Rear-Admiral Gordon Gordon-Taylor, O.B.E., M.S., M.B., F.R.C.S.
- Colonel Commandant (Acting Major-General) Robert Grice Sturges, Royal Marines.
- Lieutenant-General Alexander Hood, C.B.E., M.D., K.H.P., late Royal Army Medical Corps.
- Lieutenant General Sir Wilfrid Gordon Lindsell, K.B.E., D.S.O., M.C., Colonel Commandant, Royal Artillery.
- Major-General Malcolm Neynoe MacLeod, D.S.O., M.C., Colonel Commandant, Royal Engineers.
- Major-General Richard Talbot Snowden-Smith, C.B.E., M.I.Mech.E., late Royal Army Service Corps.
- Major-General Arthur Harold Loughborough, O.B.E., late Royal Artillery.
- Major-General Robert Hall Allen, M.C., late Royal Artillery.
- Major-General Gordon Nevil Macready, C.M.G., D.S.O., O.B.E., M.C., late Royal Engineers.
- Major-General William Wyndham Green, D.S.O., M.C., late Royal Artillery.
- Major-General (acting Lieutenant-General) Henry Beresford Dennitts Willcox, D.S.O., M.C., late The East Lancashire Regiment.
- Major-General (acting Lieutenant-General) Edmund Charles Acton Schreiber, D.S.O., late Royal Artillery.
- Major-General Kenneth Marten Body, C.M.G., O.B.E., Royal Army Ordnance Corps.
- Chaplain-General to the Forces the Reverend Charles Douglas Symons, M.C., M.A., D.D., K.H.C., Royal Army Chaplains' Department.
- Major-General Kenneth Morley Loch, M.C., late Royal Artillery.
- Colonel (temporary Major-General) John Noble Kennedy, M.C., late Royal Artillery.
- Colonel (local Brigadier) Stewart Graham Menzies, D.S.O., M.C., retired pay, late The Life Guards.
- Major-General Roland Dening, M.V.O., M.C., Indian Army.
- Major-General Henry Finnis, M.C., Indian Army.
- Major-General John Fagan Henslowe Nugent, D.S.O., Indian Army.
- Major-General (temporary Lieutenant-General) Henry Douglas Wynter, C.M.G., D.S.O., Australian Military Forces.
- Air Vice Marshal George Brindley Aufrere Baker, M.C.
- Air Vice Marshal Wilfred Ashton McClaughry, D.S.O., M.C., D.F.C.
- Air Vice Marshal Lionel Douglas Dalzell McKean, O.B.E.
- Air Vice Marshal Charles Edward Hastings Medhurst, O.B.E., M.C.
- Air Vice Marshal John Cotesworth Slessor, D.S.O., M.C.
- Acting Air Vice Marshal Leslie Norman Hollinghurst, O.B.E., D.F.C.
- Acting Air Vice Marshal Hugh Pughe Lloyd, C.B.E., M.C., D.F.C.
- Air Commodore William Alec Coryton, M.V.O., D.F.C.
- Air Commodore Hugh Leedham, O.B.E.
- Air Commodore Robert Parker Musgrave Whitham, O.B.E., M.C.
- Air Commodore William Dowling Bostock, O.B.E., Royal Australian Air Force.

Civil Division

- Honorary Brigadier-General Sir Norman Archibald Orr-Ewing, Bt., D.S.O., D.L., chairman, Territorial Army Association of the County of Stirling.
- Honorary Colonel Henry Evan Pateshall Pateshall, D.S.O., D.L., chairman, Territorial Army Association of the County of Hereford.
- Brevet Colonel MacDonald Barkley, D.L., chairman, Territorial Army Association of the County of Huntingdon.
- Ernest Gold, Esq., D.S.O., O.B.E., F.R.S., deputy director of the Meteorological Office.
- Eric St John Bamford, Esq., C.M.G., Principal Assistant Secretary and Controller of Administration, Ministry of Information.
- Edward Gordon Bearn, Esq., C.B.E., Under-Secretary and Controller of Health Insurance and Pensions, Ministry of Health.
- William Guy Nott-Bower, Esq., C.B.E., Deputy Under-Secretary for Mines.
- William Vincent Bradford, Esq., Secretary, and Member of the Board of Inland Revenue.
- Norman Craven Brook, Esq., Principal Assistant Secretary, Privy Council Office, and Personal Assistant to the Lord President of the council.
- Charles Glyn Evans, Esq., Principal Assistant Secretary, Air Ministry.
- Edwin Charles Jubb, Esq., O.B.E., Director of Navy Contracts, Admiralty.
- Guy William Lambert, Esq., Assistant Under-Secretary of State, War Office.
- Rupert Churchill Gelderd-Somervell, Esq., Under-Secretary, Board of Trade.
- Charles John Stewart, Esq., O.B.E., F.R.Ae.S., Director-General of Production of Engines and Aircraft Equipment, Ministry of Aircraft Production.

=== Order of Merit (OM) ===
- Sir Edwin Landseer Lutyens, K.C.I.E., F.S.A., F.R.I.B.A., D.C.L., LL.D., President of the Royal Academy.

=== Order of the Star of India ===
==== Companion of the Order of the Star of India (CSI) ====
- Edward Richard John Ratcliffe Cousins, Esq., C.I.E., Indian Civil Service, Adviser to His Excellency the Governor of Bihar.
- Eric Cecil Ansorge, Esq., C.I.E., Indian Civil Service, late Adviser to His Excellency Governor of Orissa.
- Eric Conran-Smith, Esq., C.I.E., Indian Civil Service, Secretary to the Government of India in the Home Department.
- Harold George Dennehy, Esq., C.I.E., Indian Civil Service, Chief Secretary to the Government of Assam.
- William Scott Brown, Esq., C.I.E., Indian Civil Service, Secretary to the Government of Madras in the Finance Department.
- Maharaj Mahdhata Singh, Major, Prime Minister, Bikaner State, Rajputana.

=== Order of St Michael and St George ===
==== Knight Grand Cross of the Order of St Michael and St George (GCMG) ====
- Sir Arthur Frederick Richards, K.C.M.G., Captain-General and Governor-in-Chief of the Island of Jamaica.
- Sir Archibald John Kerr Clark Kerr, K.C.M.G., His Majesty's Ambassador Extraordinary and Plenipotentiary to the Republic of China.

==== Knight Commander of the Order of St Michael and St George (KCMG) ====
- Sir Albert Henry Self, C.B., K.B.E., Director-General, British Air Commission, Washington.
- David Taylor Monteath, Esq., C.B., C.V.O., O.B.E., lately acting Permanent Under-Secretary of State, Burma Office.
- Arthur James Dawe, Esq., C.M.G., O.B.E., Assistant Under-Secretary of State, Colonial Office.
- Vincent Golcalves Glenday, Esq., C.M.G., O.B.E., Governor and Commander-in-Chief, Somaliland Protectorate.
- Sir Josiah Crosby, K.B.E., C.I.E., until recently His Majesty's Envoy Extraordinary and Minister Plenipotentiary at Bangkok.
- Eugen Millington-Drake, Esq., C.M.G., until recently His Majesty's Envoy Extraordinary and Minister Plenipotentiary at Montevideo.

Honorary KCMG

- His Highness Hasan Nuruddin Iskander II, Sultan of the Maldives.

==== Companion of the Order of St Michael and St George (CMG) ====
- Hubert Miles Gladwyn Jebb, Esq., Foreign Policy Adviser, Ministry of Economic Warfare.
- David Hume Lyal, Esq., M.B.E., Director, Department of Overseas Trade.
- Thomas Michael Burke, Esq. For public services in the State of Victoria.
- Stephen Lewis Holmes, Esq., M.C., Assistant Secretary, Dominions Office.
- John Hubert Preston, Esq., M.C., lately a Member of the Commission of Government, Newfoundland.
- Thomas George Wilson, Esq., M.D., F.R.C.S., a prominent gynaecologist in the State of South Australia.
- James Baxter, Esq., Financial Adviser to the Governor of Burma.
- George Neil Farquhar, Esq., M.C., Colonial Administrative Service, Financial Secretary, Gold Coast.
- Dugan Homfray Hampshire, Esq. For public services in the Federated Malay States.
- William Leslie Heape, Esq., Colonial Administrative Service, Colonial Secretary, Bahamas.
- Stephen Oswald Vere Hodge, Esq., Colonial Administrative Service, Provincial Commissioner, Kenya.
- Theo Hoskyns-Abrahall, Esq., Colonial Administrative Service, Deputy Chief Secretary, Nigeria.
- Alec Seath Kirkbride, Esq., O.B.E., M.C., Colonial Administrative Service, British Resident, Trans-Jordan.
- Major Granville St John Orde Browne, Esq., O.B.E., Labour Adviser to the Secretary of State for the Colonies.
- John Clark Stronach, Esq., Director of Public Works, Kenya.
- Leslie Tester, Esq., M.C., Colonial Administrative Service, Financial Secretary, Kenya.
- Arthur John Wakefield, Esq., Inspector-General of Agriculture for the West Indies, and Agricultural Adviser to the Comptroller for Development and Welfare in the West Indies.
- George Henry Webster, Esq., O.B.E., Colonial Postal Service, Postmaster-General, Palestine.
- Hyman Weisberg, Esq., Colonial Administrative Service, Financial Secretary, Straits Settlements.
- Nevile Montagu Butler, Esq., C.V.O., Head of the North American Department, Foreign Office.
- Victor Frederick William Cavendish-Bentinck, Esq., Head of the Dominions Intelligence Department, Foreign Office.
- Arthur Byres Hutcheon, Esq., O.B.E., Head of the Consular Department, Foreign Office.
- Thomas Ifor Rees, Esq., His Majesty's Consul-General at Mexico City.
- Harry Chapman Sinderson, Esq., O.B.E., M.V.O., Professor of Medicine, Royal College of Medicine, Iraq.
- Captain Herbert Bardsley Taylor, R.N. For services rendered to the Foreign Office.
- George Gordon Medlicott Vereker, Esq., M.C., until recently His Majesty's Envoy Extraordinary and Minister Plenipotentiary at Helsingfors.

=== Order of the Indian Empire ===
==== Knight Commander of the Order of the Indian Empire (KCIE) ====
- Claude Henry Gidney, Esq., C.S.I., C.I.E., Indian Political Service, Resident at Hyderabad.
- Tennant Sloan, Esq., C.S.I., C.I.E., Indian Civil Service, Adviser to His Excellency the Governor of the United Provinces.
- Lieutenant-General Donald Kenneth McLeod, C.B., D.S.O., Indian Army, General Officer Commanding the Army in Burma.
- John Anderson Thorne, Esq., C.S.I., C.I.E., Indian Civil Service, Secretary to the Governor-General (Public).
- Frederick Hale Puckle, Esq., C.S.I., C.I.E., Indian Civil Service, Secretary to the Government of India in the Department of Information and Broadcasting.
- John Charles Walton, Esq., C.B., M.C., lately Assistant Under-Secretary of State for India.
- Sir George Riddoch Campbell, lately Shipping Controller for India and Representative of the Ministry of War Transport in India, Burma and Ceylon.

==== Companion of the Order of the Indian Empire (CIE) ====
- Sonti Venkata Ramamurty, Esq., Indian Civil Service, Chief Secretary to the Government of Madras.
- Ewen Moore Gawne, Esq., Indian Civil Service, Member, Board of Revenue, Madras.
- Colonel (acting Major-General) Rob McGregor Macdonald Lockhart, M.C., Secretary, Military Department, India Office, and lately Director of Staff Duties, General Headquarters, India.
- Rana Shri Ranjitsinhji Gambhirsinhji, Thakor of Jambughoda.
- Zahid Husain, Esq., Indian Audit and Accounts Service, Additional Financial Adviser (Supply), Military Finance Department, Government of India.
- Charles Vanne Salusbury, Esq., Indian Civil Service, Commissioner, Ambala Division, Punjab.
- George Christian Laughton, Esq., Agent and General Manager, Bombay, Baroda and Central India Railway Company, Bombay.
- Robert William Target, Esq., Deputy Director-General, Department of Supply, Government of India.
- Balchandra Krishna Gokhale, Esq., Indian Civil Service, Officiating Commissioner, Bhagalpur Division, Bihar.
- Colonel (Temporary Brigadier) Roger Crofton, M.C., Indian Army, Director of Armaments, General Headquarters, India.
- Colonel (Temporary Brigadier) Keith de Lorentz Young, M.C., Indian Army, Commandant, Indian Military Academy, Dehra Dun.
- Colonel (Temporary Brigadier) Cyril Maton Periam Durnford, Indian Army, Brigadier, General Staff, Northern Command, India.
- Archibald Gifford Scott, Esq., Indian Police, Officiating Inspector-General of Police, Central Provinces and Berar.
- Harnam Das Bhanot, Esq., Indian Civil Service, Secretary to the Government of the Punjab in the Finance Department.
- Ronald Leslie Walker, Esq., Indian Civil Service, Secretary to the Government of Bengal in the Finance Department.
- Joseph Richard Harrison, Esq., Chief Mining Engineer, Railway Board, Calcutta.
- James Currie MacDougall, Esq., Indian Agricultural Service, Director of Agriculture, Central Provinces and Berar.
- Satis Chandra Majumdar, Esq., Chief Engineer, Communication and Works Department, Irrigation Branch, Bengal.
- Vaduvur Shrinivas Sundaram, Esq., Indian Audit and Accounts Service, Accountant-General, Madras (on leave).
- Lieutenant-Colonel Madan Gopal Bhandari, Indian Medical Service, Inspector of Prisons, Bombay.
- Colonel Arthur Frank Friend Thomas, Deputy Controller-General of Inspection, Department of Supply, Government of India.
- Leonard Burges Gilbert, Esq., Indian Service of Engineers, Chief Engineer, Public Works Department (Buildings and Roads), United Provinces.
- Gerald Lacey, Esq., Indian Service of Engineers, Chief Engineer, Irrigation Branch, United Provinces.
- Lieutenant-Colonel William Elliot Randal Dimond, L.R.C.P. & S., D.P.H. (Dub.), Indian Medical Service, lately Officiating Inspector-General of Civil Hospitals, North-West Frontier Province.
- Major Henry Mortimer Poulton, Indian Political Service, Political Agent, Bundelkhand, Central India.
- Lancelot Cecil Lepel Griffin, Indian Political Service, Political Agent, Orissa States.
- Francis Everard Sharp, Esq., Indian Police, Deputy Inspector-General of Police, Criminal Investigation Department, Bombay.
- Reginald Norman Marsh-Smith, Esq., Indian Police, Inspector-General of A.R.P. and Civic Guard, United Provinces.
- Lieutenant-Colonel Martin Melvin Cruickshank, Indian Medical Service, Chief Medical Officer and Civil Surgeon, Delhi, and lately Superintendent, Government General Hospital, Madras.
- William Christopher Wordsworth, Esq., Indian Education Service (retired), Member of the Bengal Legislative Assembly.
- John Wilfred Nicholson, Esq., Indian Forest Service, Conservator of Forests, Orissa.
- Lieutenant-Colonel Robert Hay, M.B., D.P.H., D.T.M. & H., Indian Medical Service, Deputy Director-General, Indian Medical Service.
- Lieutenant-Colonel Arthur Henry Harty, M.B., M.R.C.S., Indian Medical Service, Civil Surgeon and Superintendent, B. J. Medical School, and Superintendent, Mental Hospital, Ahmedabad, Bombay.
- George Herbert Baxter, Esq., Secretary, Financial Department, India Office.
- Waris Ameer Ali, Esq., Indian Civil Service (retired), Honorary War Services Liaison Officer in the Office of the High Commission for India, London.
- Rai Bahadir Dinanath, Barrister-at Law, Prime Minister, Indore State, Central India.
- James Jones, Esq., of Messrs James Finlay and Company, chairman, Indian Tea Association.
- Sri Krishna, Esq., PhD, D.Sc. (Lond.), F.I.C., F.N.I., Biochemist, Forest Research Institute, Dehra Dun.
- Roger Thomas, Esq., managing director, Sind Land Development Company, Sind.

=== Royal Victorian Order ===
==== Knight Grand Cross of the Royal Victorian Order (GCVO) ====
- Brigadier-General Sir Smith Hill Child, Bt., K.C.V.O., C.B, C.M.G., D.S.O.

==== Knight Commander of the Royal Victorian Order (KCVO) ====
- Lieutenant-Colonel The Honourable Piers Walter Legh, C.M.G., C.I.E., C.V.O., O.B.E.

==== Commander of the Royal Victorian Order (CVO) ====
- Ronald Clive Wallace Burn, Esq.
- John Francis Gore, Esq., T.D.

==== Member of the Royal Victorian Order (MVO) ====
At this time the two lowest classes of the Royal Victorian Order were "Member (fourth class)" and "Member (fifth class)", both with post-nominals MVO. "Member (fourth class)" was renamed "Lieutenant" (LVO) from the 1985 New Year Honours onwards.

Fourth Class

- George Alfred Titman, O.B.E., M.V.O.

Fifth Class

- John Davidson, Esq.
- Marjorie Lewis Martin, Mrs Heagarty.
- Herbert Allen Smith, Esq.

=== Order of the British Empire ===
==== Knight Commander of the Order of the British Empire (KBE) ====
- Admiral Bertram Sackville Thesiger, C.B., C.M.G. (Retired).
- Vice-Admiral Raymond Fitzmaurice, D.S.O. (Retired).
- Lieutenant-General Lionel Vivian Bond, C.B., retired pay, Colonel Commandant, Royal Engineers.
- Major-General John Palairet Scobell, C.B., C.M.G., D.S.O., retired pay, late The Royal Norfolk Regiment.
- Major-General (acting Lieutenant-General) Arthur Francis Smith, C.B., D.S.O., M.C., late Coldstream Guards.
- Major-General Bernard Cyril Freyberg, V.C., C.B., C.M.G., D.S.O., LL.D., New Zealand Military Forces.

==== Officer of the Order of the British Empire (OBE) ====
- Thomas Henderson, Chief Engineer, SS Empire Bond, O.B.E
- Lieutenant-Colonel Daya Ram Thapar, M.D., D.T.M. and H., Indian Medical Service, Indian Army
- Margery Helen Wace (Mrs Ormond Wilson), Empire Talks Director, British Broadcasting Corporation

==== Member of the Order of the British Empire (MBE) ====
- S. G. Karmarkar, Royal Indian Naval Reserve
