= Billingham (surname) =

Billingham is an English surname. Notable people with the surname include:

- Angela Billingham (born 1939 as Angela Theodora Case), British Labour politician
- Jack Billingham (born 1943), American baseball player and coach
- John Billingham (1930–2013), British physician
- John Alfred Lawrence Billingham (1868–1945), English army officer
- Mark Billingham (born 1961), English author and actor
- Richard Billingham (born 1970), British photographer and artist
- Rupert E. Billingham (1921–2002), English biologist
