= John Thorne (civil servant) =

Sir John Anderson Thorne KCIE, CSI (17 October 1888 – 29 April 1964) was a senior civil servant in the Indian Civil Service who served as the Secretary of the Home Department and later as Home Member of the Viceroy’s Executive Council.

== Early life ==
John Anderson Thorne was born in Madagascar and educated at Blundell's School in Tiverton. He passed the Indian Civil Service examinations in 1911 and spent his probation at Balliol College at Oxford.

== Indian Civil Service ==
Thorne spent 22 years in various posts in the Madras Presidency and in 1920 was selected to be Secretary of the Board of Revenue, holding this position for two years. After time in district work he returned to the board in 1931 and in 1935 officiated as joint secretary to the Government of India, Home Department, and shortly thereafter took charge of the secretaryship until 1938. In 1938 Thorne was selected to be Secretary to the Governor-General (Public) and on two occasions he acted for brief periods as a temporary member of the Governor-General’s Council, and in 1945 became Home Member, a position he held until his retirement in 1946.

== Later life ==
On the expiry of his term, Thorne returned to England and farmed at Sedlescombe.

== Honours ==
Thorne was made a Companion of the Order of the Indian Empire in the 1931 Birthday Honours, Companion of the Order of the Star of India in the 1938 New Year Honours and Knight Commander of the Order of the Indian Empire in the 1942 New Year Honours.
