= John Francis Johns =

British diplomat

John Francis Johns CMG

Consul-General for Siam
- In office 1924–1931

Personal details
- Born: 1885
- Occupation: Diplomat

John Francis Johns CMG was a British diplomat who was Consul-General for Siam from 1925 to 1931.

== Biography ==
Johns was born in 1885. In 1907, he was appointed student interpreter in Siam. In 1911, he was appointed Vice-Consul for Bangkok, in 1914, was Vice-Consul Phuket, and in 1917, was Acting Consul in Singora. After being employed briefly by the Foreign Office, he was appointed Acting Consul in charge of the British Consulate at Saigon, remaining in the post from 1917-18, before returning to Phuket as Vice-Consul.

In 1924, he was appointed Consul General for Siam and First Secretary of the Legation at Bangkok. In each year from 1924 to 1930, he also acted as Chargé d'Affaires. He retired in 1931 due to ill health.

== Honours ==
Johns was made a Companion of the Order of St Michael and St George (CMG) in the 1931 Birthday Honours.
