= Margery Wace =

British radio director (1904-1944)

Margery Helen Wace (later Margery Wilson) OBE was a British broadcaster best known for her development of the talks programmes of the BBC, including heading this branch of the BBC Empire Service.

== Early life ==
Margery Wace was a cousin of Wilfred Roberts. She obtained a history degree from the University of Oxford.

After university, Wace worked as the head of the Oxford section of the League of Nations Union, working with Professor Gilbert Murray.

== Broadcasting career ==
Wace joined the BBC in 1930 and in the early 1930s, worked for BBC director of talks, Charles Siepmann. Wace led the programme At Home Today following from Elise Sprott, which featured international politics and the scientific management of the home. Wace structured the Thursday morning talk programme to feature short talks from experts on subjects as varied as herrings, Hitler's popularisation of umbrellas, and painting homes with plastic-based paint.

Wace worked alongside Mary Adams and Mary Somerville.

By 1936, after five years heading the morning talks programme, Wace went to work on talks for the Empire service. She noted that news and topical talks were particularly popular and she aimed to develop programming for sailors. Wace became Empire Talks Director in 1941 and was responsible for selecting broadcasts to English-speaking countries.

== Personal life ==
Wace married Ormond Wilson on 29 September 1940 in Ardingly, Sussex; she was his superior at work. They had a daughter, Cecilia. Wace died during labour with their second child in 1944, aged 39.

== Honours and recognition ==
In the 1942 New Year Honours, Wace was recognised with an OBE.
