= Hyman Weisberg =

British colonial administrator (1890–1976)

Hyman Weisberg CMG
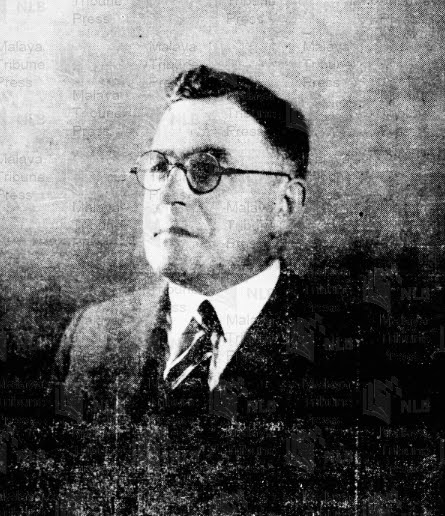
- Weisberg ca.1939
- Born: 1890; London
- Died: 21 July 1976 (aged 85 or 86)
- Education: Christ's College, Cambridge
- Occupation: Colonial administrator
- Children: 2

Hyman Weisberg (1890 – 21 July 1976) was a British colonial administrator who served as Financial Secretary of the Straits Settlements from 1937 to 1941.

== Early life and education ==
Weisberg, who was Jewish, was born in 1890 in the East End of London. He was educated at Rutland Street School, Stepney, Central Foundation Boys' School and Christ's College, Cambridge where he was a Wrangler, gaining first-class honours in the Mathematical Tripos.

== Career ==
Weisberg joined the Malaya civil service as a cadet in 1914, and served in various posts in the Federated Malay States and the Straits Settlements. In 1934, he was acting as Under-Secretary to the Government in the Federal Secretariat. In 1935 he was appointed acting Treasurer of the Straits Settlements, and in 1937, was appointed Colonial Treasurer, Straits Settlements. Later in 1937, as part of Empire-wide reorganisation, he was appointed to the new post of Financial Secretary, Straits Settlements. Created throughout the important Colonies, the new post was reserved for men of ability and experience who were able to advise the government on financial policy, and to act as the government's spokesman on financial and economic matters. In 1940, he was appointed acting Colonial Secretary, Straits Settlements. On 7 December 1941, it was reported that Weisberg had been appointed British Resident of Perak replacing Marcus Rex but following the Japanese invasion of Malaya the appointment never proceeded.

Weisberg served as a member of the Executive and Legislative Assemblies. In 1941, he was appointed a member of the Singapore Harbour Board.

After the Second World War, he served as Director of the Finance Division of the Allied Commission in Austria and in 1947, worked in the German Section of the Foreign Office.

== Personal life and death ==
Weisberg married Ester Riva Cernjack in 1930 and they had a son and a daughter.

Weisberg died on 21 July 1976.

== Honours ==
Weisberg was appointed Companion of the Order of St Michael and St George (CMG) in the 1942 New Year Honours.
