= Samuel Guise-Moores =

British Army general (1863–1942)

Major-General Sir Samuel Guise-Moores KCB KCVO CMG KStJ
- Born: 24 December 1863
- Died: 3 October 1942 (aged 78)

Major-General Sir Samuel Guise Guise-Moores, KCB, KCVO, CMG (24 December 1863 – 3 October 1942) was a senior British Army officer of the First World War who also served as Honorary Surgeon to George V.

== Military career ==
Moores commissioned into the Royal Army Medical Corps as surgeon-captain on 1 February 1890, and served in the Chitral Relief Expedition in 1895, in medical charge of the 1st Battalion Gordon Highlanders and No. 8 Mountain Battery Royal Artillery. He served in the Second Boer War in South Africa (1899–1902), attached to the Scots Guards taking part in the Kimberley relief force, and was present at the battles of Belmont, Enslin and Modder River (November 1899), where he was wounded. For his service, he was promoted to surgeon-major on 29 November 1900, and twice mentioned in dispatches. Following the end of the war, Moores left Cape Town for England on the SS Simla in July 1902.

He served in France throughout the First World War running various hospitals before being appointed Director of Medical Services for the Second Army in April 1918, and later the same post for the Army of Occupation in Germany. He had responsibility for medical services at the British Empire Exhibition at Wembley in 1924. Guise-Moores was Colonel Commandant of the Royal Army Medical Corps between 1927 and 1933. He was promoted to major general in June 1919.

Guise-Moores was appointed a Companion of the Order of the Bath (CB) in the 1915 Birthday Honours, a Companion of the Order of St Michael and St George (CMG) in the 1918 New Year Honours, a Knight of Grace of the Order of Saint John, and promoted to Knight Commander of the Order of the Bath in the 1925 Birthday Honours. He was made Knight Commander of the Royal Victorian Order in the 1931 Birthday Honours.
