= Govind Balvant Pradhan =

Indian politician

Sir Govind Balvant Pradhan was a legislator in British India. He served as a Member of the Bombay Legislative Council and in the Bombay Presidency Government as the Minister of Forest, Excise & Agriculture from 1927 to 1928 and the Finance Member from 1928 to 1933. He was one of India's representatives at the League of Nations in 1937.
