= Audrey Chitty =

British ATS officer and Girl Guide executive

Audrey Chitty OBE
- Chitty from a 1944 newspaper article
- Born: Audrey Troyte Harper; 12 March 1897; Patea, New Zealand
- Died: 19 February 1979 (aged 81); Newent, Gloucester, UK
- Other name: Mrs J W Chitty
- Spouse: John W Chitty (m. 1924)
- Children: 1

Audrey Chitty OBE, TD (12 March 1897 – 19 February 1979) was one of the first officers to join the Auxiliary Territorial Service (ATS). She was instrumental in establishing the Palestine Auxiliary Territorial Service (PATS) in 1941. In 1943 she was awarded an OBE for her role in establishing the ATS in the Middle East.

Chitty was a Girl Guide Association (GGA) executive. She was awarded the Kaiser-i-Hind medal for public service in 1931 while Guiding in India.

== Personal life ==
Audrey Troyte Harper was the second of three children of Ethel and C C Harper, the archdeacon of Wellington, New Zealand. She moved to England with her mother and siblings in 1904. She married John Walter Chitty, later a lieutenant colonel in the Essex regiment, in Glendale, Northumberland in April 1924 and the couple moved to Bombay (Mumbai), India soon after. They had one daughter.

Chitty returned to England, with her family, in 1932 where she lived in London and Guilden Morden, Cambridgeshire. She became a naturalized British citizen in 1949. In later life she moved to Gloucester and volunteered on the Gloucester Cathedral committee. At her funeral, in lieu of flowers, donations were made to the ATS Benevolent Fund.

=== WWII ===
Chitty was one of the first women to sign up to the ATS in 1938. Her first role was county commandant for Surrey. When war broke out in 1939 Chitty was appointed assistant director of the Eastern command headquarters. Between 1940 and 1944 she served as ATS's chief commander in the Middle East. She travelled to Cairo in 1940 to "examine the possibility of enrolling all British Army wives or dependents and local women into the ATS." The idea didn't come to fruition as the women were generally "reluctant to be subject to military discipline."

The longest serving senior officer in the region, she was responsible for 5,000 women. Her command covered Eritrea, Sudan, Egypt, Syria, Palestine, Cyprus, Cyrenaica and Tripolitania. In the role she "recruited thousands of volunteers, including Greek refugees and Jews and Arabs in Palestine." Few of the volunteers spoke English and none of the British officers spoke Arabic, Hebrew, Greek, Czech or Slovak, meaning all orders had to be made via interpreters. Before she left Cairo, she oversaw the arrival of 20 ATS linguists, who had been sent to work there in a "highly secretive capacity" becoming the first ATS unit to be established overseas.

Upon her return to England, Chitty she oversaw ATS personal at Chilwell and then onto Anti-Aircraft Command Headquarters. In December 1941 she returned to the Middle East where she worked with Hadassah Samuel of the Women's International Zionist Organisation (WIZO) to establish the Palestinian Territorial Auxiliary Service (PATS), based in Sarafand al-Amar.

In July 1944 Chitty was appointed deputy director of the ATS Western Command, overseeing the north-west, West Midlands and the west of England. She received the OBE for her ATS service in October 1944. She was awarded the Africa Star ribbon on 12 November 1948.

== Girl Guides ==
Chitty began her association with the Girl Guide movement in India. She was honorary general secretary for All-India Girl Guides from 1928 to 1932. She was awarded the Kaiser-i-Hind medal for her service to Guiding in 1931. After she moved to the UK in 1932 year she held several positions within the Girl Guides Association, including Lone Guides commissioner and London NW county commissioner from 1954 to 1959. In 1958, while speaking on the causes of juvenile delinquency, she "criticised mothers who go to work" saying it was "one of the very worst trends of today." She was awarded the movement's Medal of Merit for her service.

== Other ==
In October 1947 Chitty was elected to the fellowship of the Royal Geographical Society.

In 1960 Chitty became chair of the newly formed Committee of Friendship, established by St Marylebone council and supported by the The Victoria League for Commonwealth Friendship. The committee was set up to welcome "lonely coloured Commonwealth students living in back street digs" who were falling prey to propaganda and exploitation.

In 1961 she was chair of the Women's Council, in co-operation with women from India, Pakistan, Ceylon, Indonesia, Federation of Malaya, Thailand and the Philippines. It was formed out of the Women's Advisory Council on Indian Affairs. Between 1962 and 1968 she was a vice-president.

== See also ==
- Audrey Chitty and the ATS in Palestine article from the National Army Museum
