= Craven baronets =

Extinct baronetcy in the Baronetage of the United Kingdom

There have been two baronetcies created for persons with the surname Craven, one in the Baronetage of England and one in the Baronetage of the United Kingdom. Both creations are extinct.

The Craven Baronetcy, of Spersholt in the County of Berkshire, was created in the Baronetage of England on 4 June 1661 for Anthony Craven. The title became extinct on his death in 1713.

The Craven Baronetcy was created in the Baronetage of the United Kingdom on 21 January 1942 for Sir Charles Craven, OBE, Chairman and managing director of Vickers-Armstrong. The title became extinct on the early death of the second Baronet in 1946.

== Craven baronets, of Spersholt (1661) ==
- Sir Anthony Craven, 1st Baronet (1626–1713)

== Craven baronets (1942) ==
- Sir Charles Worthington Craven, 1st Baronet (1884–1944)
- Sir Derek Worthington Clunes Craven, 2nd Baronet (1910–1946)
