= Eric Pridie =

British medical doctor and civil servant

Sir Eric Denholm Pridie, KCMG, DSO, OBE (10 January 1896 – 3 September 1978) was a British medical doctor and civil servant. He was Director of the Sudan Medical Service from 1933 to 1945 and Chief Medical Officer, Colonial Office from 1949 to 1958.
