= William Reynolds-Stephens =

British artist and sculptor

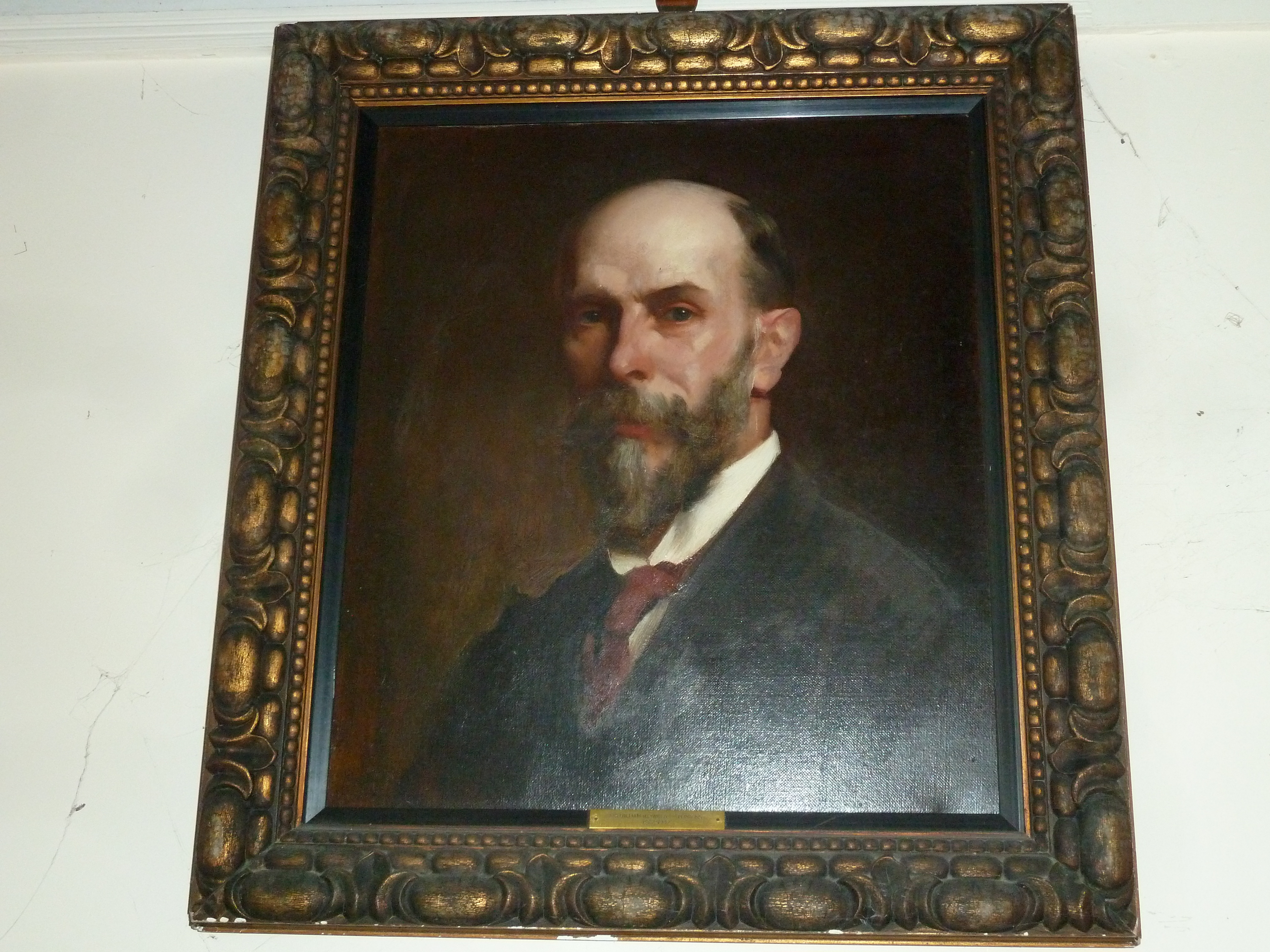
Portrait in St Lawrence, IOW

Sir William Ernest Reynolds-Stephens FRBS (Detroit 8 August 1862 – Tunbridge Wells 23 February 1943) was an American-born British artist and sculptor.

He was educated at Blackheath School of Art and the Royal Academy School. He exhibited there from 1886 until 1942. His work can also be seen at St Paul's Cathedral, Lambeth Palace and Southwell Minster.

For 11 years he was president of the Royal Society of British Sculptors.

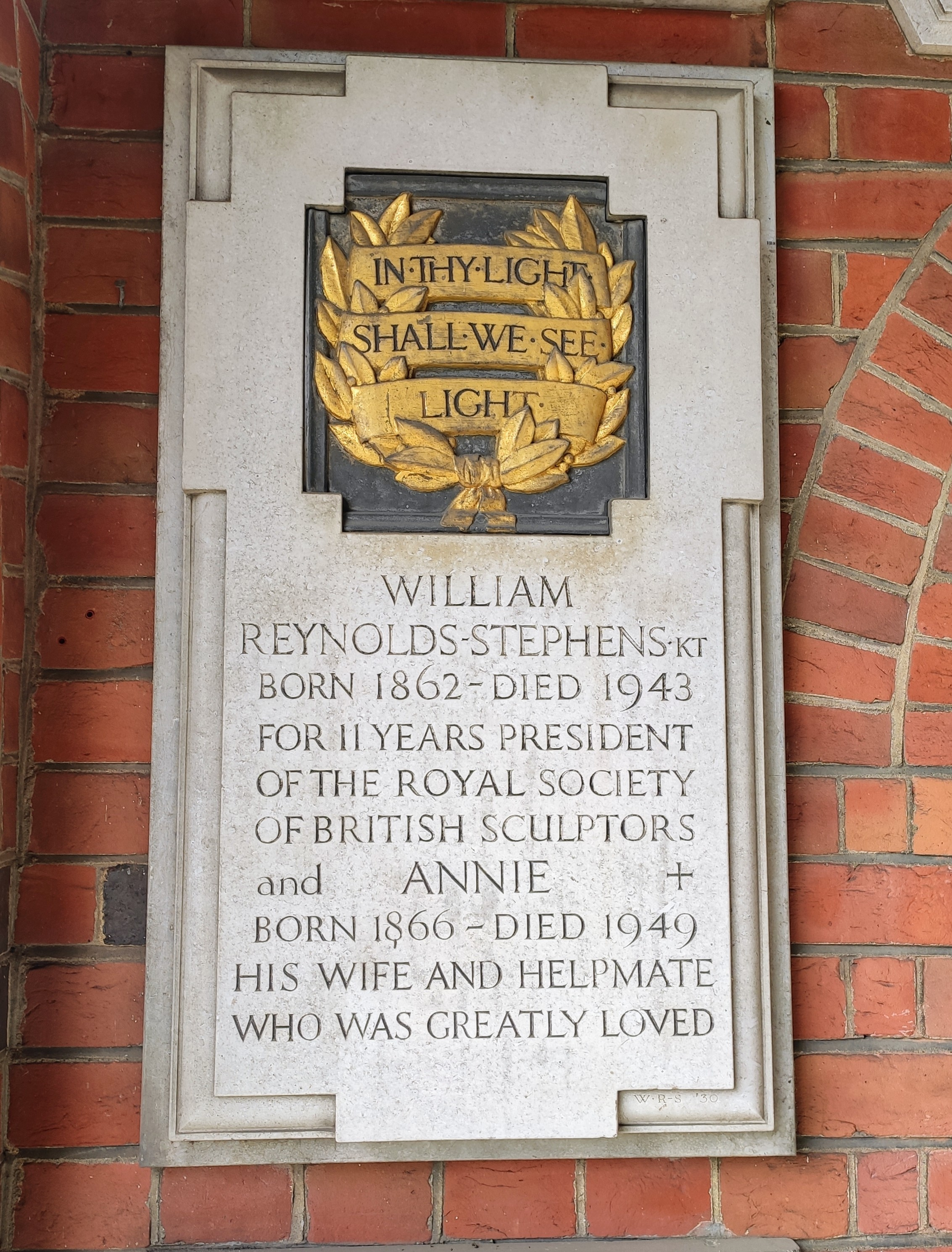
Plaque dedicated to Reynolds-Stephens and his wife at Golders Green Crematorium

He was cremated at Golders Green Crematorium.
