= Albert Lancelot Hoops =

Irish surgeon

Albert Lancelot Hoops CBE
- Born: 6 June 1876; County Leitrim, Ireland
- Died: January 1941 (aged 64)
- Occupations: Surgeon and Chief Medical Officer of the Straits Settlements
- Years active: 1901-1941
- Spouse: Miss Stringer
- Children: 2 sons and 3 daughters

Albert Lancelot Hoops CBE (6 June 1876 – January 1941) was an Irish surgeon who served as Chief Medical Officer of the Straits Settlements during the 1920s.

== Early life and education ==
Albert Lancelot Hoops was born on 6 June 1876 in County Leitrim, Ireland, and was educated at King William's College and Trinity College, Dublin.

== Career ==
From 1901-02, he served in the South African War (also known as the Second Boer War (1899-1902)) as a medical officer with the 28th Mounted Infantry, was severely wounded, was mentioned in dispatches, and was awarded the Queen's South African Medal with four clasps.

In 1904, he joined the Malayan Medical Service after passing an examination at the School of Tropical Medicine, London, and was sent to Penang where he was employed as House Surgeon of the General Hospital, and the following year was appointed Acting Colonial Surgeon Resident, Penang.

In 1906, he was seconded to the Kedah Government to establish a modern medical service in the state. He described the dire health situation which he faced on arrival: "The gaol was an overcrowded den where from a quarter to a half of those confined died each year, chiefly from bowel diseases. There was no vaccination; smallpox was epidemic and most adults bore traces of it. There was no proper registration of births and deaths. It was necessary to collect and train native staffs, to build institutions, to draft rules and enactments suitable for a primitive country, and to have them enforced."

Hoops spent fourteen years in Kedah as State Surgeon carrying out reforms to health services whilst also performing many other important roles including Director of all Labour, Superintendent of Indian Immigration, Superintendent of Prisons, and on two occasions acted as British Resident of Kedah in 1906-07.

In 1921, he was transferred to Singapore to take up the appointment of Chief Medical Officer of the Straits Settlements. He spent the next ten years in the position whilst at the same time fulfilling many other roles including Chairman of the Tuberculosis Committee (1923), President of the Far Eastern Association of Tropical Medicine (1923), member of the Medical Enquiry Committee of the Federated Malay States (1925), Director of the League of Nation's Eastern Bureau (1929), and from 1923 to 1931, he also served as a member of the Legislative Council.

Hoops retired from government service in 1931 to take up the appointment of Senior Medical Officer of the Malacca Agricultural Medical Board. In 1939, he left Malacca for London and joined the Ross Institute of Tropical Hygiene and was sent to Sierra Leone to carry out a study on the health situation in the country, and to undertake malaria research work.

Hoops died in January, 1941.

== Personal life ==
Hoops married the daughter of T. Stringer in 1901, and they had two sons and three daughters. He was a keen yachtsman serving as vice-commodore of the Singapore Yacht Club.

== Honours ==
In 1902, Hoops was awarded the Queen's South African Medal with four clasps for service during the South African War.

In 1913, he received the Arnott Gold Medal.

In 1931, he was awarded the Commander of the Order of the British Empire (CBE).
