= John Alfred Lawrence Billingham =

Colonel John Alfred Lawrence Billingham CBE FRICS (1868–1955) was Chief Inspector of Works at the War Office (1928–1933).

== Life ==
Billingham was born in 1868 in Newport, Monmouthshire, the son of Alfred Billingham, an accountant, and his wife Thomasine. He was educated at Bedford Modern School.

In 1890 Billingham joined the staff of the Royal Engineers as a surveyor. He became Chief Inspector of Works at the War Office (1928–1933). He was made a Commander of the Order of the British Empire on 3 June 1931 and was a Fellow of the Royal Institution of Chartered Surveyors, London.

Billingham was interested in horticulture and photography. He married Florence, the daughter of James Barter, JP; they had one son and two daughters. His wife predeceased him. Billingham died on 21 March 1955 in Surbiton, Surrey.
