= John Gurney =

John Gurney may refer to:

== Norwich bankers ==
- John Gurney (1655–1721), founder of the banking Quaker Gurney family
- John Gurney (1719–1779), co-founder of Gurney's Bank in Norwich
- John Gurney (1749–1809), father of Elizabeth Fry
- John Gurney (1809–1856), eldest son of Samuel Gurney
- John Gurney (mayor) (1845–1887), mayor of Norwich (1885)
- John Henry Gurney Sr. (1819–1890), MP for King's Lynn and amateur ornithologist
- John Henry Gurney Jr. (1848–1922), banker and ornithologist

== Other people ==
- John Gurney (bass-baritone), (1902–1997), American opera singer
- John Gurney (football chairman), former chairman of Luton Town F.C.
- Sir John Gurney (judge) (1768–1845), barrister and judge, of a family of noted stenographers
- John Gurney (MP), MP for Norfolk (1399)
- John Hampden Gurney (1802–1862), Anglican clergyman and hymnist
- John Chandler Gurney (1896–1985), U.S. Senator from South Dakota

== See also ==
- Joseph John Gurney (1788–1847), significant figure in the history of the Quakers
