= Samuel Gurney =

Samuel Gurney may refer to:

- Samuel Gurney (1723–1770), whose daughter married Samuel Hoare Jr
- Samuel Gurney (1786–1856), head of Gurney's Bank and Overend, Gurney and Company
- Samuel Gurney (MP) (1816–1882), his son, MP for Penryn & Falmouth

== See also ==
- Gurney family (Norwich)
