= John Gurney Hoare =

English cricketer and banker (1810–1875)

- Born: 7 May 1810; Hampstead, London, England
- Died: 16 February 1875 (aged 64); Biarritz, France
- Education: Trinity College, Cambridge
- Occupations: Cricketer & banker
- Spouse: Caroline Barclay (m. 1837)
- Parents: Samuel Hoare (father); Louisa Gurney (mother)
- Relatives: Samuel Hoare (son)

John Gurney Hoare (7 May 1810 – 16 February 1875) was an English cricketer with amateur status, and later a banker.

== Biography ==
Hoare was born in Hampstead, London, to Samuel Hoare (1783–1847), a partner in Bland, Barnett & Hoare, bankers (which after mergers and name changes was eventually taken over by Lloyds Bank), and his wife Louisa, the daughter of John Gurney. He was the grandson of the Quaker banker Samuel Hoare, one of the twelve founding members of the Society for the Abolition of the Slave Trade.

He was educated privately and at Trinity College, Cambridge, where he graduated as 20th Wrangler. He became a partner in his father's bank and inherited Hill House, Hampstead. A plaque near the site of the house states that "he was the prime mover in the battle to save Hampstead Heath from development."

== Cricket ==
While he was at Cambridge, Hoare appeared in one match in 1831, playing for Cambridge University as a batsman of unknown handedness. His name was recorded incorrectly as "James Gurney Hoare". He scored nine runs over both innings with a highest score of 7 not out.

== Family ==
On 18 March 1837, at St Martin's Church, Dorking, in Surrey, Hoare married Caroline (1814–1878), the daughter of Charles Barclay (1780–1855) and Anna Maria Kett (1781–1840), of Cheapside, London.

John and Caroline's eldest son, Samuel, was MP for Norwich from 1886 to 1906, and in 1889 the Hoare baronetcy was created for him.

Hoare died on 10 March 1875 at the Grand Hotel in Biarritz, France, and was buried there.

== Bibliography ==
- Haygarth, Arthur (1996) [1862]. Scores & Biographies, Volume 1 (1744–1826). Kennington: Frederick Lillywhite. ISBN 978-19-00592-23-9.
- Haygarth, Arthur (1997) [1862]. Scores & Biographies, Volume 2 (1827–1840). Kennington: Frederick Lillywhite. ISBN 978-19-00592-23-9.
