= Lancelot Carnegie =

British diplomat (1861–1933)

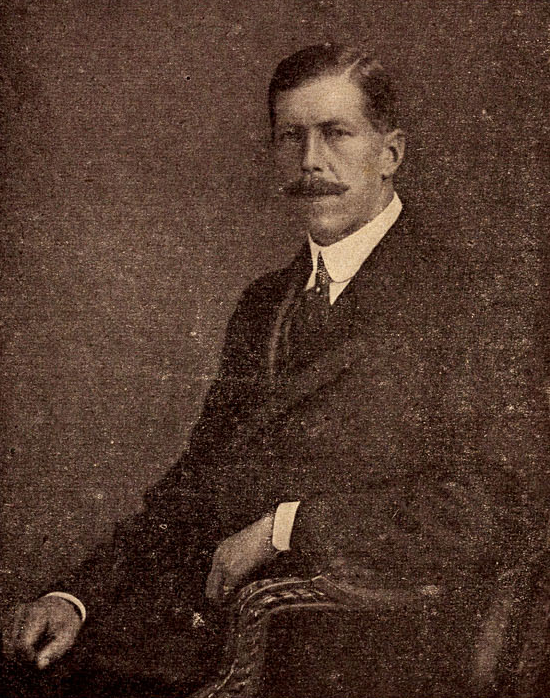
Carnegie in 1917

Sir Lancelot Douglas Carnegie GCVO KCMG (Edinburgh, 26 December 1861 – London, 15 October 1933), was a British diplomat.

He was the second son of the 9th Earl of Southesk, and the eldest son by his second marriage (1860) to Lady Susan Murray (died 1915), eldest daughter of Alexander Murray, 6th Earl of Dunmore. His matrilineal great-uncle was the diplomat and statesman Sidney Herbert, Lord Herbert of Lea.

Lancelot Carnegie attended Eton College and Oxford University. In 1887, he took on diplomatic functions in the Foreign Office. He passed through the diplomatic offices of Madrid, Petrograd, Beijing, Vienna and Paris before his last and longest assignment, in Lisbon. He was British Minister (1913–1924) and then Ambassador and Minister Plenipotentiary to the Republic of Portugal from 1925 to 1928, when he reached the age limit.

== Honours ==
- MVO: Member (fourth class) of the Royal Victorian Order – 11 Oct 1901
- GCVO: Knight Grand Cross of the Royal Victorian Order
- KCMG: Knight Commander of the Order of St Michael and St George – 1916 New Year Honours

In 1924 he was appointed to the Privy Council, entitling him to the style "The Right Honourable".

== Family ==
Carnegie was married in 1890 to Marion Alice de Gournay Barclay, (1868–23 August 1961, died aged 93), daughter of Henry Ford Barclay. According to their granddaughter Lady John Kerr, Marion lost her hearing at the age of 30, but this did not stop her leading a full life. Lady Carnegie was the daughter of Henry Ford Barclay by his first wife Richenda Louisa Gurney (d. 1888) the youngest daughter of Samuel Gurney, of Ham House, Upton Park, himself of the landed family Gurney of Walsingham Abbey, Norfolk.

The Carnegies had three children

1. Mariota Susan Carnegie (1892–) later Lady Gurney, married 1911, Sir Hugh Gurney (1878–1968), sometime British Ambassador to Brazil, and to Denmark in 1933, and in 1947, the chief secretary of the British Palestine government in 1947, son of John Gurney and his wife Isabel Blake-Humfrey (later wife of the 2nd Baron Talbot de Malahide); they had issue three sons and three daughters, of whom the second married Lord John Kerr, younger brother of the 12th Marquess of Lothian and the third (Susan) Richenda (b. 1937) married the 2nd Lord Elton.
2. Dorothea Helena Carnegie (1906–1985) later Countess of Mansfield & Mansfield; married 1928, Mungo Murray, 7th Earl of Mansfield and Mansfield (1900–1971), then Viscount Stormont. They had issue one son (the 8th Earl) and two daughters (one of whom married the 20th Earl of Moray).
3. James Murray Carnegie (1909–1985), who married 1939, Diana Winifred Mary Renshaw, daughter of Henry Arthur Renshaw. They had issue five daughters, including twins (the two youngest), but two daughters died very young.

== Arms ==
Coat of arms of Lancelot Carnegie

Escutcheon
Argent an eagle displayed Azure beaked and membered Gules charged on its breast with three mullets of the field for difference.
