= Louisa Gurney Hoare =

English diarist and writer on education (1784–1836)

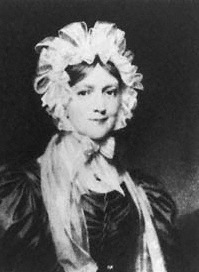
- Born: 25 September 1784; Earlham Hall, near Norwich, England
- Died: 6 September 1836 (aged 51); Hampstead, London, England
- Spouse: Samuel Hoare (m. 1806)
- Parents: John Gurney (father); Catherine Bell (mother)
- Relatives: Elizabeth Gurney (sister); Joseph Gurney (brother); Samuel Gurney (brother); Daniel Gurney (brother); Samuel Hoare (father-in-law); John Gurney Hoare (son)
- Writing career
- Subject: Standards of education
- Notable works: Hints for the Improvement of Early Education and Nursery Discipline

Louisa Gurney Hoare (25 September 1784 – 6 September 1836) was an English diarist and writer on education, and a member of the Gurney family. She was concerned particularly with standards of education.

== Early life ==
Gurney was born on 25 September 1784. She was the seventh of the eleven children of John Gurney (1749–1809) of Earlham Hall near Norwich, a Quaker, and of Catherine Bell (1754–1792). Her father inherited Gurney's Bank in Norwich. Her siblings included Elizabeth Fry, prison reformer, Joseph John Gurney (1788–1847) and Samuel Gurney (1786–1856), philanthropists, and Daniel Gurney (1791–1880), banker and antiquary.

The Gurney siblings were educated privately, at first by their mother and then by Catherine Bell Gurney, the eldest sister, according to her mother's precepts. The regimen of play, adult conversation and free use of Earlham library was at variance with the Quaker traditions of that period. They were permitted to explore other religions and had both Unitarian and Roman Catholic friends, partly through the Norwich school to which Joseph John was sent, where his sisters also attended some lessons.

All the children were encouraged to keep diaries or "journals of conscience". Louisa's was the most avidly kept. It recorded adolescent enthusiasms for nature, music, and politics, and her aversion to the duller aspects of Quaker observance, and to any unjust treatment of herself or her brothers and sisters. She wrote that she was disgusted when a twelve-year-old second cousin of hers kissed her. She later married that cousin, the 23-year-old banker Samuel Hoare (1783–1847) of Hampstead, on 24 December 1806 at Tasborough Meeting House in Norfolk.

The marriage was strongly supported by her father-in-law, also Samuel Hoare. According to her sister-in-law, "I know of no event which gave my father more pleasure than the engagement of his son to the daughter of his old friend. With perfect confidence in her principles, and a persuasion that she would make my brother happy, he was pleased with her being, like my mother, a Norfolk woman, and interested himself much in procuring for them an house at Hampstead that they might be established near him." Both the husband and the wife were baptised into the Church of England in 1812.

Samuel and Louisa were the parents of John Gurney Hoare and their descendants included the politicians Sir Samuel Hoare, 1st Baronet, and Sir Samuel John Gurney Hoare, 2nd Baronet (later Viscount Templewood).

== Causes and ideas ==
Louisa came to be considered by her family as the most talented of the brothers and sisters. She contributed to several of their causes: the anti-slavery campaign of her brother-in-law Sir Thomas Fowell Buxton, and the prison reform movement of her sister Elizabeth Fry and her own husband.

However, her main concern became education. Her Hints for the Improvement of Early Education and Nursery Discipline (1819) was originally written for the nursemaid (nanny) to the first of her six children. "Good education," she wrote in the introduction, "must be the result of one consistent and connected system." The book continued to sell well for eighty years. Her experience was enriched by family tradition and by the influences of 18th- and 19th-century authorities such as John Locke, François Fénelon, John Foster, Thomas Babington, and Philip Doddridge, and contemporaries of hers such as Sarah Trimmer and Hannah More.

Hoare's second book, Friendly Advice on the Management and Education of Children, Addressed to Parents of the Middle and Labouring Classes of Society (1824), was intended to supplement school learning. Its message that discipline should "preserve children from evil, not from childishness" foreshadows affirmative views of childhood that would gain strength in the Victorian era. Parents, she pointed out, should respect their children and treat them justly, understanding that they, too, have rights. Most importantly, parents should set a good example, for their children would imitate their speech and actions.

In 1825, she co-founded the Ladies' Society for Promoting Education in the West Indies, which was supported by other members of the Hoare, Gurney, Buxton and Ricardo families. Her final work was a slim book called Letters from a Work-House Boy (1826). This was several times reprinted by the Religious Tract Society.

Louisa Hoare died in Hampstead on 6 September 1836. One of her children, Edward, later wrote an account of the upbringing he had received.
