= Samuel Hoare =

Samuel Hoare may refer to:

- Samuel Hoare Jr (1751–1825), British Quaker and abolitionist
- Sir Samuel Hoare, 1st Baronet (1841–1915), British Conservative politician, MP 1886-1906
- Samuel Hoare, 1st Viscount Templewood (1880–1959), British Conservative politician, Foreign Secretary

== See also ==
- Samuel Hoar (1778–1856), American lawyer and politician
- Sam Hoare (disambiguation)
