= Samuel Hoare Jr =

English Quaker abolitionist, (1751–1825)

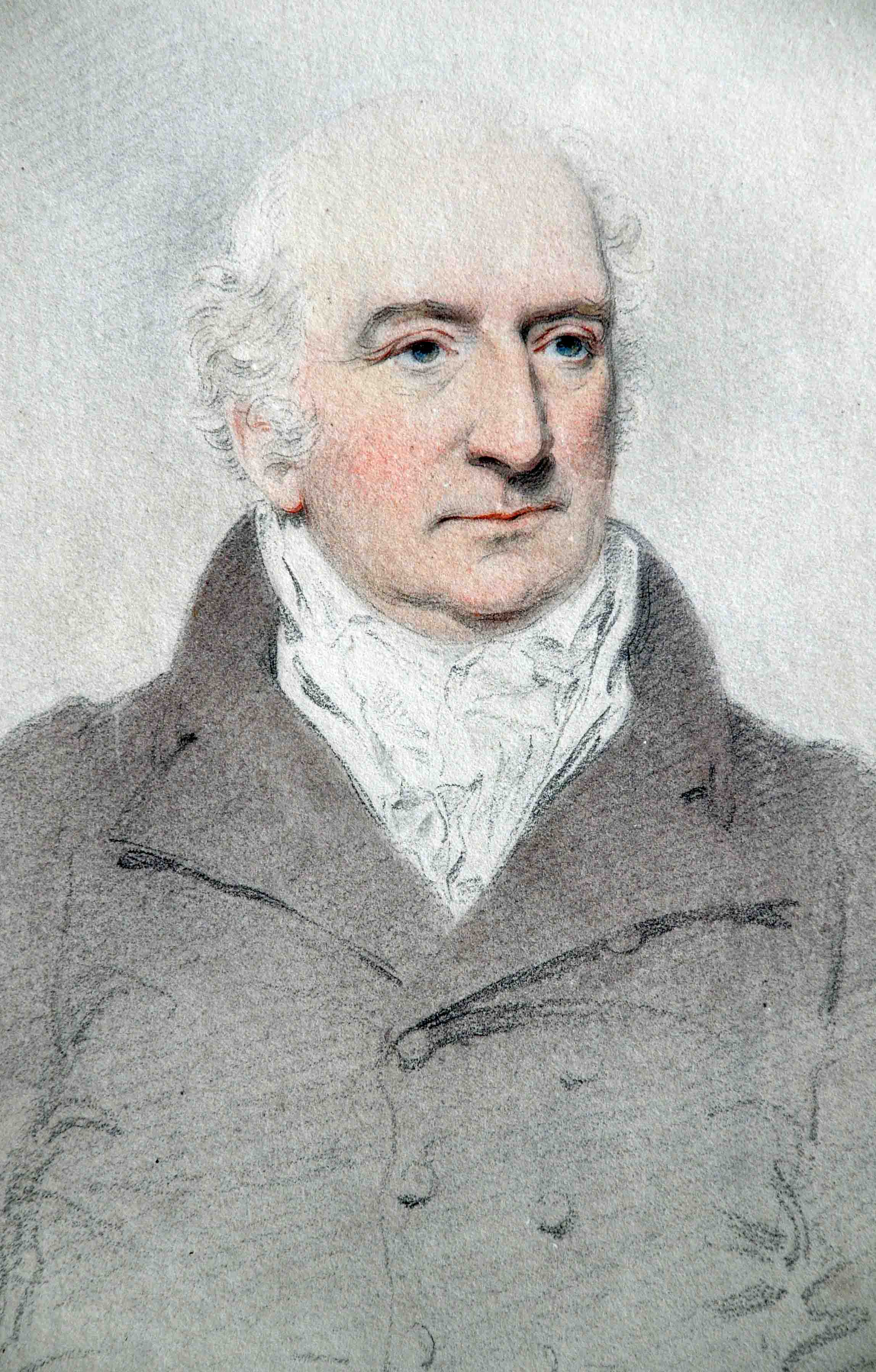
- Samuel Hoare by Joseph Slater
- Born: 9 August 1751; Stoke Newington, England
- Died: 14 July 1825 (aged 73)
- Occupation: Banker
- Known for: Abolitionist
- Spouse(s): Sarah Gurney Hannah Sterry (m. 1788)
- Father: Samuel Hoare Sr
- Relatives: Sarah Hoare (daughter); Louisa Gurney (daughter-in-law)

Samuel Hoare Jr (9 August 1751 – 14 July 1825) was a wealthy British Quaker banker and abolitionist born in Stoke Newington, then to the north of London in the county of Middlesex. From 1790, he lived at Heath House on Hampstead Heath. He was one of the twelve founding members of the Society for the Abolition of the Slave Trade.

== Background ==
Hoare's parents were Samuel Hoare Sr (1716–1796), a London merchant from an Irish background, and Grizell Gurnell (c. 1722–1802), of Ealing. It was a numerous family, although the eldest son, Joseph, died at 25.

His only surviving brother Jonathan, merchant of Throgmorton Street and partner in Gurnell, Hoare & Co, built Paradise House (now Clissold House and open to the public), a mansion in what became Clissold Park, across Stoke Newington Church Street from the family home in Paradise Row. Jonathan ran into financial difficulties, which led Samuel Jr to attempt to assist him.

One of their sisters married Thomas Bradshaw, a linen manufacturer in Ireland. Another, Mary, married the abolitionist Joseph Woods and bore the more famous botanist and architect son of the same name. The youngest sister Grizell (1757-1835) married Wilson Birkbeck in 1801, having stayed at home as nurse and companion to her father; as a wealthy 72-year-old widow, she married William Allen, another notable Quaker abolitionist, with whom she founded Newington Academy for Girls in 1824. Their elderly marriage was greeted by a satirical cartoon entitled "Sweet William & Grizzell–or–Newington nunnery in an uproar!!!" by Robert Cruikshank.

== Early life ==
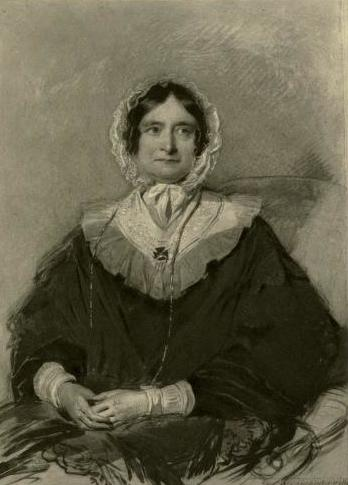
Sarah Hoare in 1840, who wrote her father's biography

Samuel Jr was sent away to school when he was five years old, returning home only once a year. The school was in Penketh, between Warrington and Widnes on the Irwell, and was run by Gilbert Thompson. In his mid-teens he became apprenticed to Henry Gurney in Norwich, a woollen manufacturer. He had some connection with the Freshfield family there; James William Freshfield lived in Fleetwood House on Stoke Newington Church Street. He followed several branches of the Hoare family in pursuing a career in banking.

He married Sarah (1757–1783), eldest daughter of Samuel Gurney (1723–1770) of the Gurney family in Norwich. Ninety friends and relatives witnessed their marriage. They lived first in Old Broad Street and could afford four servants without scrimping. Their children were Sarah Hoare (born 1777), Hannah (born 1779), and Grizell (known as Sophia or Sophy) (born 1781), and then a longed-for son, Samuel (1783–1847): "My brother was born January 14th, 1783. My father was so delighted with this event, that he hastened to his friend Mrs. Chorley that she might share his pleasure. "I have too much good news," he said, "for one day. The birth of a son, and peace concluded with America."

Sarah died ten days later, and was buried at Winchmore Hill. The widower moved his family back to Stoke Newington, in the same street as his father, so that his sisters, particularly Grizell, could help with raising the children.

== Work ==
His main interests at this time were the abolition of the slave trade and the establishment of Sunday schools across the country. He was also involved in a plan to establish a free black colony in Sierra Leone. Many of his neighbours were abolitionists. From 1774 James Stephen spent his summers in Stoke Newington at the Summerhouse next to Fleetwood House.

In 1772, he became a junior partner in the Lombard Street bank of Bland and Barnett, which became Barnett, Hoare & Co. The bank traded under the sign of the black horse. Further mergers followed, to form Barnetts, Hoares, Hanbury & Lloyd and ultimately in 1884, Lloyds Banking Company took over Barnetts, Hoares, Hanbury & Lloyd in a bid to gain a foothold in London and acquired the black horse sign which continues in use as the Lloyds Bank logo. The leading partner in Barnetts, Hoares, Hanbury & Lloyd, Edward Broadie Hoare, joined the Lloyds board of directors and became Deputy Chairman.

In 1788, Samuel Hoare Jr married Hannah Sterry, the 19-year-old daughter of Henry and Mary Sterry, of Bush Hill, Enfield and Hatton Garden. The family holidayed in Cromer, and kept up the connections with his first wife's relatives. Later his illness drove him to take the family to Bath, where a medical man advised him that the New River, running so close to Stoke Newington Church Street and Clissold Park, might be harming his health.

In 1790, they moved to higher ground, to Heath House, a prominent mansion in Hampstead, at the crest of the hill about four miles north of the City. The Hoares entertained generously. William Howitt referred to Heath House as "Mr Hoare's hospitable mansion". According to Edward Walford (1878):

The poet Crabbe was a frequent visitor at the hospitable residence of Mr. Samuel Hoare, on the Heath. Campbell writes: "The last time I saw Crabbe was when I dined with him at the house of Mr. Hoare, at Hampstead. He very kindly came to the coach to see me off, and I never pass that spot on the top of Hampstead Heath without thinking of him." The mansion is called "The Hill," and was the seat of Mr. Samuel Hoare, the banker. Here used to congregate the great poets of the age, Rogers, Wordsworth, Coleridge, Campbell, Lucy Aikin, Mrs. Marcet, and Agnes and Joanna Baillie; whilst the centre of the gathering was the poet Crabbe. In the "Life of the Rev. George Crabbe," by his son, we read: "During his first and second visits to London my father spent a good deal of his time beneath the hospitable roof of the late Samuel Hoare, Esq., on Hampstead Heath. He owed his introduction to this respectable family to his friend Mr. Bowles, and the author of the delightful 'Excursions in the West,' Mr. Warner; and though Mr. Hoare was an invalid, and little disposed to form new connections, he was so much gratified with Mr. Crabbe's manners and conversation, that their acquaintance grew into an affectionate and lasting intimacy. Mr. Crabbe, in subsequent years, made Hampstead his head-quarters on his spring visits, and only repaired thence occasionally to the brilliant circles of the metropolis."

The poet Joanna Baillie wrote of her visits there:

It is a goodly sight through the clear air,'
From Hampstead's healthy height, to see at once
England's vast capital in fair expanse—
Towers, belfries, lengthen'd streets, and structures fair.
St. Paul's high dome amidst the vassal bands
Of neighbouring spires a regal chieftain stands;
And over fields of ridgy roofs appear,
With distance softly tinted, side by side
In kindred grace, like twain of sisters dear,
The Towers of Westminster, her Abbey's pride.

In 1794, the Hoares became friends with Anna Laetitia Barbauld, and through her met Joseph Priestley. They knew Amelia Alderson, later Mrs Opie, Mary Knowles, the intimate of Samuel Johnson, and William Savery, a Philadelphia minister. In Bath in a later year he conversed with Hannah More.

== Children and descendants ==
In 1802, his daughter Hannah married Thomas Marlborough Pryor. His son Samuel (1783–1847) learned banking in Lombard Street from 1803, and in 1806 he married Louisa Gurney (1784–1836) of Earlham Hall near Norwich. This connected the family to (Gurney's Bank), and also to Louisa's siblings Elizabeth Fry, prison reformer, Joseph John Gurney and Samuel Gurney, philanthropists, and Daniel Gurney, banker and antiquary. The marriage was strongly supported by Samuel Hoare Jr. According to his daughter Sarah, "I know of no event which gave my father more pleasure than the engagement of his son to the daughter of his old friend. With perfect confidence in her principles, and a persuasion that she would make my brother happy, he was pleased with her being, like my mother, a Norfolk woman, and interested himself much in procuring for them an house at Hampstead that they might be established near him."

His descendants included Sir Samuel Hoare, M.P., and Viscount Templewood. His banking firm later merged with those of Joseph John Gurney and Barclays to form part of Barclays Bank. The archaeologist Francis Pryor is his four times great-grandson.

== Beliefs ==
The historian Peter Brock notes that Hoare was not wholly convinced by Quaker pacifism and quotes him as saying that he "looked upon [war] in the present state of society as a necessary evil" and that it "is the duty of a man to defend his country".

== See also ==
- List of abolitionist forerunners
