= John Gurney (mayor) =

John Gurney (11 December 1845 – 24 February 1887) was an English banker who was mayor of Norwich. He was a member of the renowned Gurney banking family of Norfolk.

== Early life ==
John Gurney was born in 1845 at Earlham Hall, Norfolk, son of Rev John Gurney (1809–1856) and Laura Elizabeth Pearse (1825-1899) of Thorpe, Norfolk. His father died when he was still young, and he was brought up by his widowed mother at Earlham.

He was educated at Harrow School, whence he proceeded to Trinity College, Cambridge, where he took his B.A. degree in 1866.

== Career ==
John Gurney was a banker in Norwich, being involved in the family bank. He became a member of the firm of Gurneys, Birkbecks, Barclay, and Buxton.

He was a Justice of the Peace (JP).

Despite being blind, he was elected Mayor of Norwich in 1885.

== Philanthropy ==
He rebuilt Sprowston Hall in 1876.

He and his wife were deeply involved in many educational and philanthropic projects in Norwich, including the conversion of Norwich Castle into the city museum. After a hundred years as a jail in the 1880s and John Gurney put up the then considerable sum of £5,000 to help move the existing Norfolk and Norwich Museum into the building from its home on St Andrews Street.

In 1874 he gave a large contribution towards the purchase of Ham House and grounds (to which he had succeeded) by the Corporation of the City of London, to serve as a public open space, now known as West Ham Park.

== Family ==
John married Lady Isabel Blake-Humfrey in 1871. Isabel was born on 20 Dec 1851 in Wroxham House, Norfolk and died on 22 Feb 1932 aged 80.

John and Isabel had seven children:

- Sybil Gurney born 1873 and died 1944.
- John Nigel Gurney, born 1874 and died in October 1902, while he held the office of High Sheriff of Norfolk.
- Laura Gurney, born 1875 and died 1957. She was awarded the MBE
- Sir Eustace Gurney, born 1876 and died 1927. He was awarded the KBE
- Sir Hugh Gurney, born 1878 and died 1968. He was awarded the MVO and KCMG
- Robert Gurney, the zoologist born 1879 and died 1950.
- Samuel Gurney, born 1885 and died 1968.

On retiring from the position of mayor in 1886, Gurney's health was failing, so he and his wife sought relaxation on the shores of the Mediterranean at Cannes, France, where he died on 24 Feb 1887 aged 41. An earthquake, which occurred at Cannes at the time of his visit, is supposed to have indirectly caused his death. He was buried in the quiet churchyard of Earlham.
