= Daniel Gurney =

English banker and antiquary (1791–1880)

- Born: 9 March 1791; Earlham Hall, near Norwich, England
- Died: 14 June 1880 (aged 89)

Daniel Gurney (1791–1880), was an English banker and antiquary from the Gurney family of Norwich.

== Life ==
Gurney was born at Earlham Hall, near Norwich, on 9 March 1791, as the youngest son of John Gurney (1749–1809) of Earlham, Norfolk, and brother of Elizabeth Fry, the philanthropist, Louisa Gurney Hoare, a writer on education, and Joseph John Gurney and Samuel Gurney. His mother, Catherine, the daughter of Daniel Bell, died in 1792. He descended directly from a younger branch of the ancient family of Gurney or Gournay, which held manors in Norfolk (in the time of Henry II).

After completing his education Gurney entered the Norwich firm of Gurney's Bank, of which he afterwards headed and for more than 60 years was a partner. He wrote several privately circulated essays on banking. As the head of one of the first banks in the English provinces, he gained social and political influence. His amiability, courtesy and generosity endeared him to his contemporaries. He was main figure behind the foundation of the West Norfolk and Lynn Hospital.

One of Gurney's pursuits was archæology, as a prominent fellow of the Society of Antiquaries. He took a great interest in genealogy. In 1848 he printed in two volumes for private circulation an elaborate Record of the House of Gournay, to which he added a supplement in 1858. The book was valued for its varied antiquarian information and research.

Gurney, a conservative in politics, was a justice of the peace and deputy-lieutenant for the county of Norfolk, and filled the office of High Sheriff of Norfolk in 1853. He married in 1822 Lady Harriet Jemima Hay (1803–1837), daughter of William Hay, 17th Earl of Erroll, by whom he had nine children. Their daughter Louisa Jane Gurney (1830 - 1867) married Sir Thomas Troubridge, 3rd Baronet. Their son Charles Henry Gurney married a daughter of Henry Thoby Prinsep and graduated from Trinity College, Cambridge to become a partner in Saunderson's Bank in London. Charles's daughter Laura Gurney married Thomas Herbert Cochrane Troubridge, 4th Baronet. Daniel Gurney died on 14 June 1880 at his seat near North Runcton, Norfolk.
