= Muriel Press =

Saga translator (1867 – 1937)

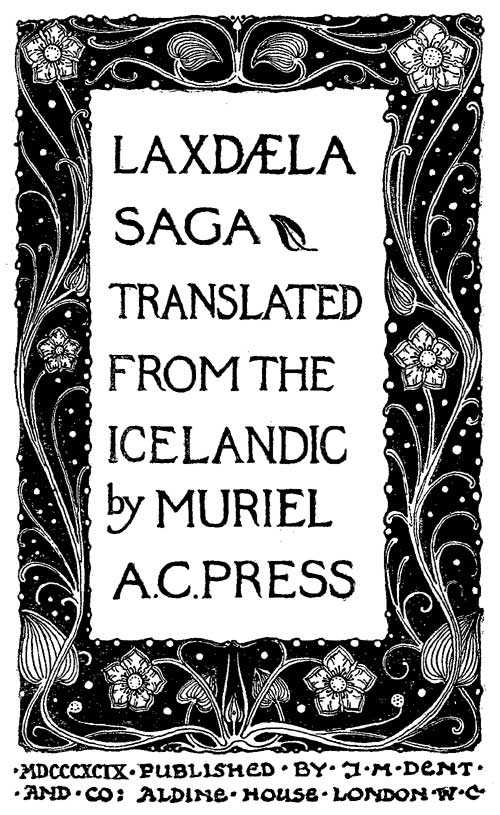
Frontispiece of Press' 1899 translation of Laxdæla Saga

Muriel Annie Caroline Press (née Hoare, 1867 – 1937) was an English translator who published the first translations of Laxdæla saga and Færeyinga saga into English.

== Life ==
She was born in London on 22 February 1867, the eldest of seven children of Sir Samuel Hoare, 1st baronet, and his wife Katherine Louisa, née Hart. Her brother was the politician Samuel John Gurney Hoare. In 1896 she married Edward Payne Press of Clifton. By 1903 they were living in Bristol.

== Translations ==
In 1899 she translated Laxdæla saga into English with the help of 'a competent Icelander' (Eiríkr Magnússon), who revised the Icelandic text. This was the first complete English translation of the saga, which had been popularised in Britain by William Morris' poem 'The Lovers of Gudrun.' It had minimal critical apparatus but proved influential, being republished by Everyman in 1906.

In 1934 she also published the first translation into English of Færeyinga saga.
