= Sarah Hoare =

British author and artist (1777–1856)

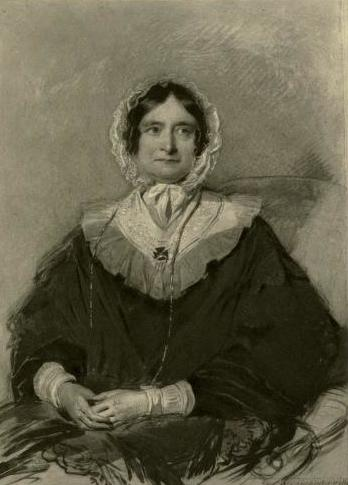
- Hoare in 1840
- Born: Sarah Hoare; 7 July 1777; Bristol, England
- Died: 1856 (aged 78–79); Bath, England
- Citizenship: British
- Occupations: Writer, artist
- Parents: Samuel Hoare Jr (father); Sarah Gurney (mother)
- Writing career
- Language: English
- Genres: Poetry, biography
- Subjects: Nature, Samuel Hoare Jr.

Sarah Hoare (7 July 1777 – 1856) was a British writer and artist known for her scientific poetry.

== Biography ==
Hoare was born on 7 July 1777 in Old Broad Street in the parish of St Peter le Poer, London, England, to Samuel and Sarah (née Gurney) Hoare.

In 1831, she wrote and illustrated Poems on Conchology and Botany. Hoare's book is an early example of a female Victorian author using observations and scientifically based research to inform her writing. Hoare's poems are a rare example of a collection based on conchology. It has been argued that Hoare and her contemporaries were influenced by the writings of Erasmus Darwin and in particular by his poem The Loves of the Plants.

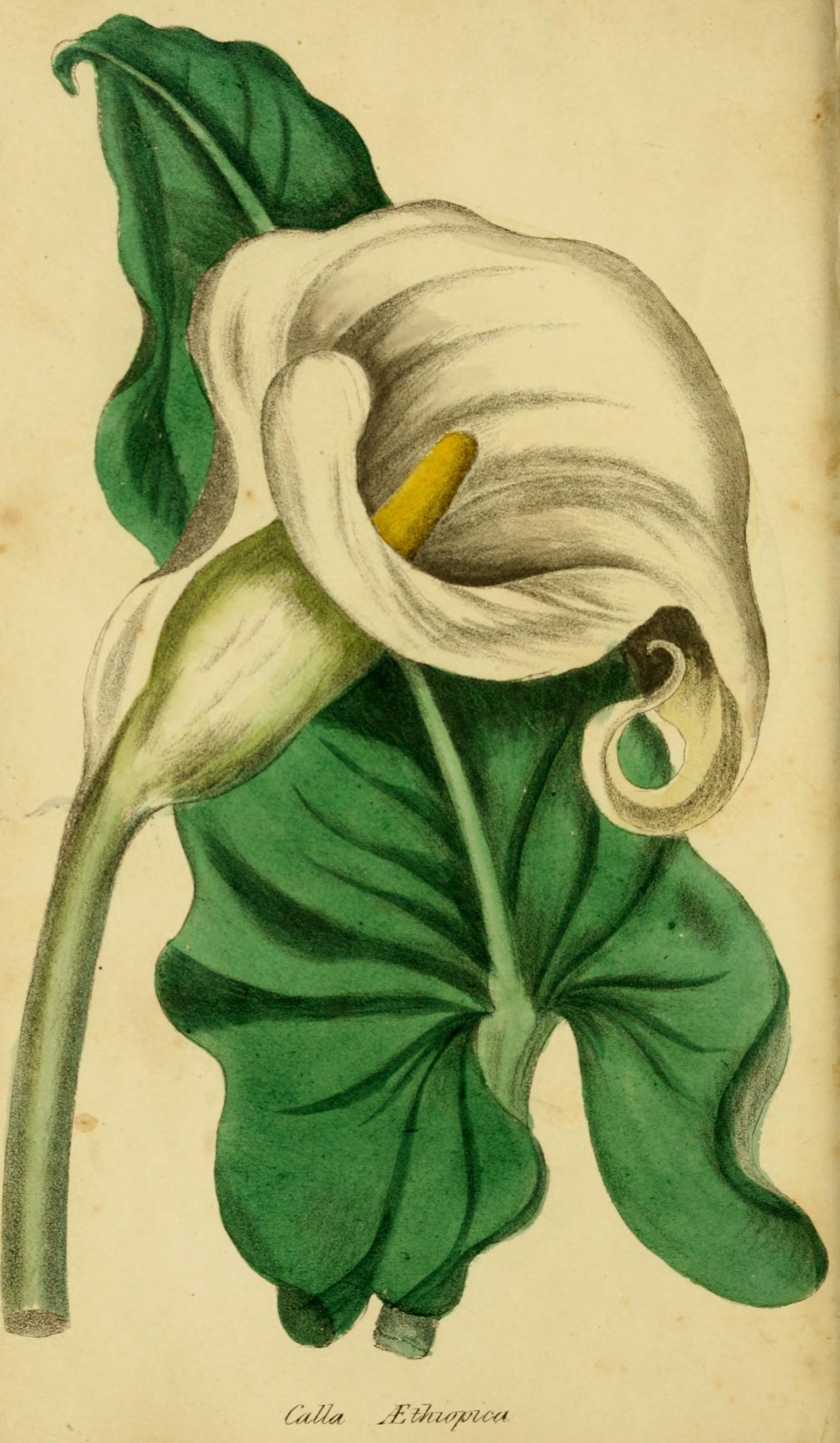
Calla aethiopica by Sarah Hoare

Hoare was also an artist. The National Portrait Gallery holds a portrait of her father Samuel Hoare based on an original work by her.

She died in Bath in 1856. Hoare wrote a memoir of her father's life that was published posthumously in 1911.

== Bibliography ==
- "A poem on the pleasures and advantages of botanical pursuits" (Women Poets of the Romantic Period, 1826)
- The brother, or, A few poems intended for the instruction of very young persons (1827)
- Poems on Conchology and Botany (Bristol: Simpkin & Marshall, 1831)
- Memoirs of Samuel Hoare by his daughter Sarah and his widow Hannah (London: Headley Brothers, 1911)
