= Gildencroft Quaker Cemetery, Norwich =

Historic cemetery in Norwich, Norfolk, England

Gildencroft Quaker Cemetery
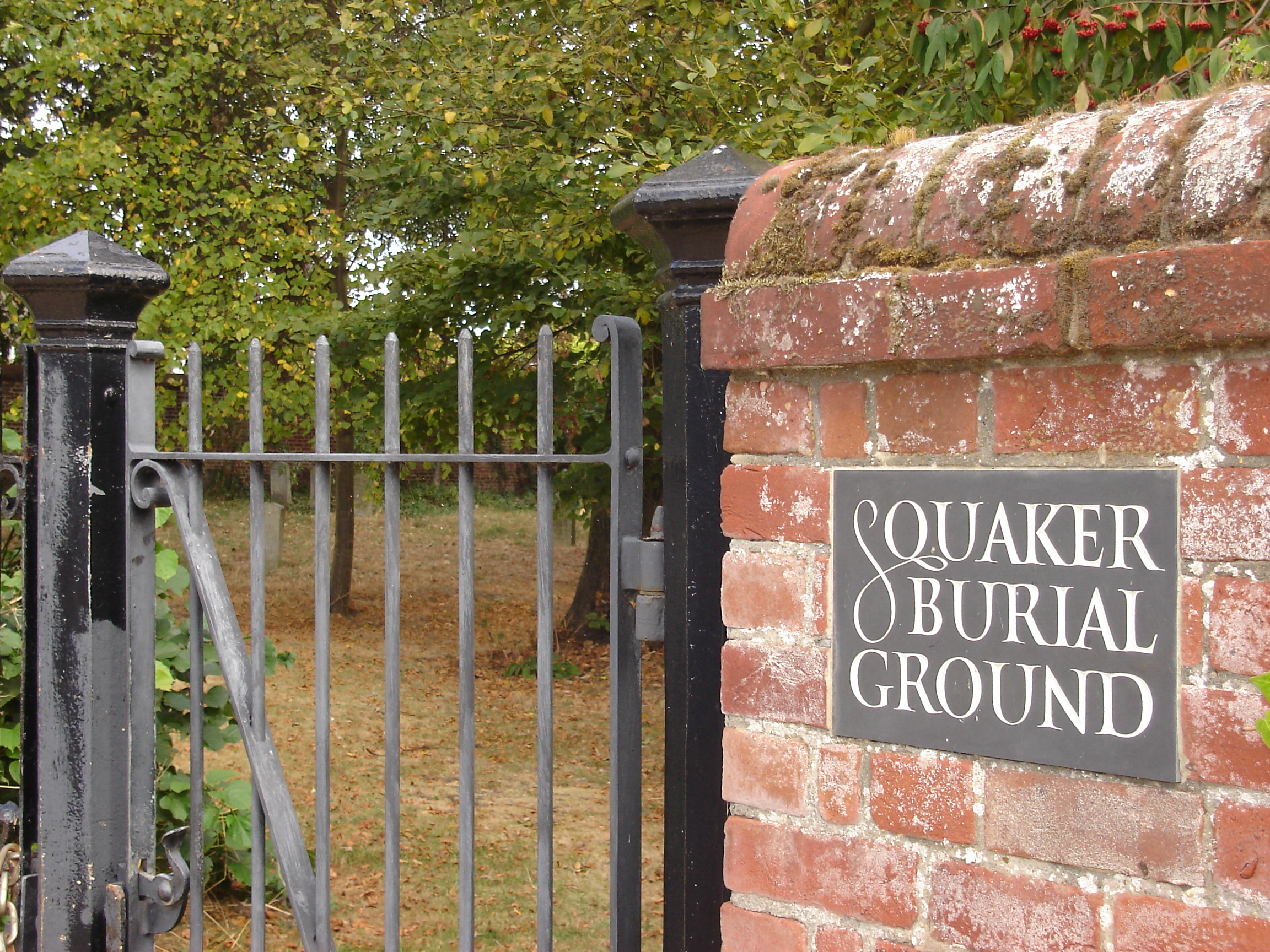
- Entrance to the cemetery
- Interactive map of Gildencroft Quaker Cemetery

Details
- Established: 1670
- Closed: 1854
- Location: Norwich, Norfolk
- Country: England
- Coordinates: 52.6362°N 1.2914°E
- No. of graves: Gurney family; Amelia Opie
- Find a Grave: Gildencroft Quaker Cemetery

The Gildencroft Quaker Cemetery is a historic cemetery in Chatham Street, Norwich, Norfolk, England, where many of the city's Quakers were buried.

In March 1670, the Norwich Quaker Society of Friends bought an acre of land at Gildencroft for use as a burial ground, paying £72. Access was via a rented strip of land The cemetery was closed for burials in 1854, but remains open for visiting.

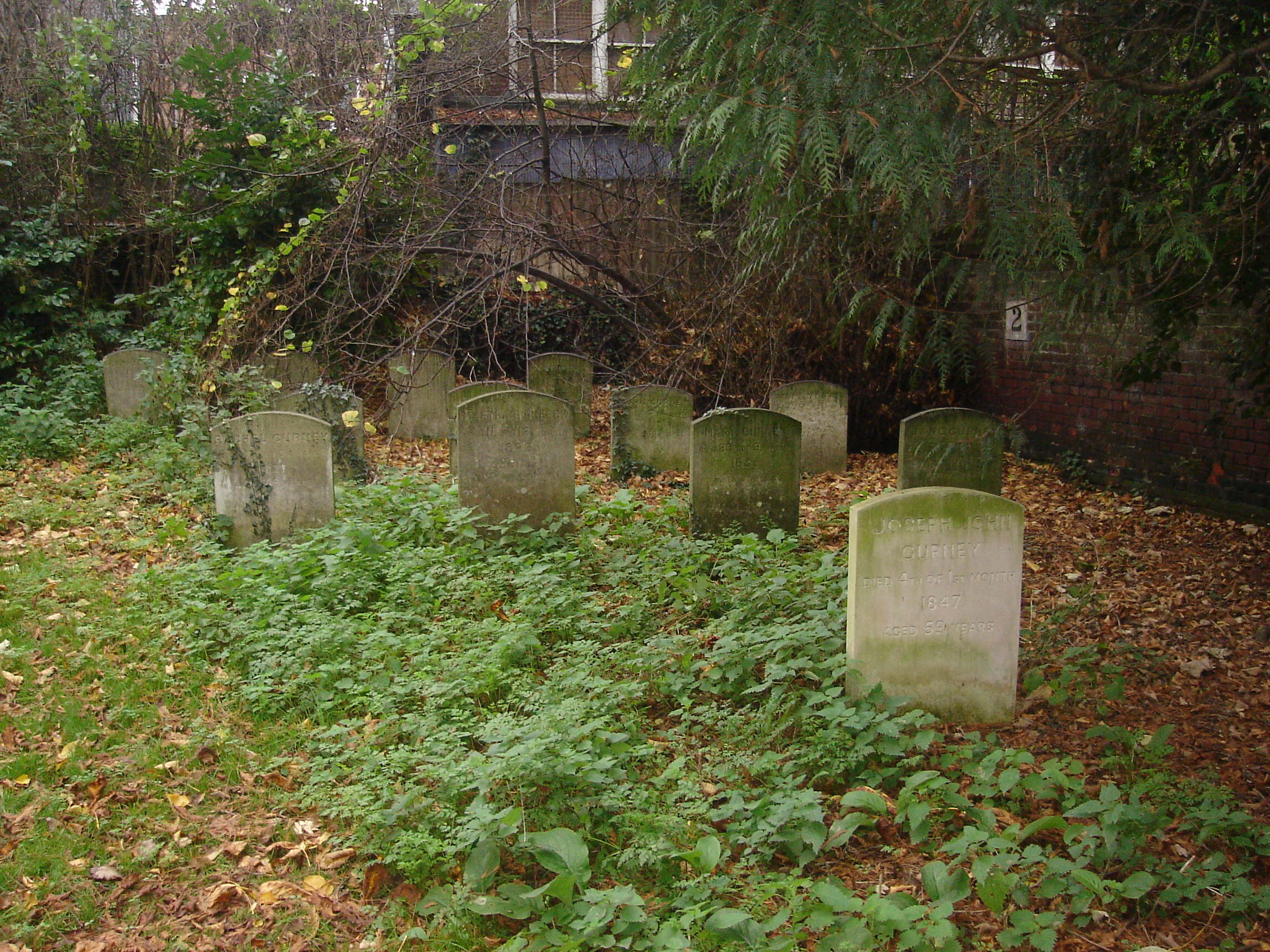
Part of the Gurney family burial plot

Graves include the Norwich-born writer Amelia Opie, buried in 1853. Many members of the Gurney family, which founded Gurney's Bank, and who had a major influence on the development of Norwich, are also buried here.

== See also ==
- Rosary Cemetery, Norwich
