= Eliza Paul Kirkbride Gurney =

- Born: Eliza Paul Kirkbride; April 6, 1801; Philadelphia, Pennsylvania, U.S.
- Died: November 8, 1888 (aged 87)
- Burial place: Burlington, New Jersey, U.S.
- Occupations: Minister, poet
- Spouse: Joseph John Gurney (married 1841–1847)

Eliza Paul Kirkbride Gurney (April 6, 1801 – 1888) was an American Quaker minister and poet. She was both a pacifist and an abolitionist.

== Life ==
Eliza Paul Kirkbride was born in Philadelphia to Quakers Mary Pauil Kirkbride and Joseph Kirkbride.

In September 1837, Kirkbride met Joseph John Gurney while returning from England. The two worked together during his trip to the United States. In July 1841, Kirkbride was recognized as a minister by the Quaker Monthly Meeting in England. She married Gurney in October 1841. The two shared an interest in pacifism and abolitionism, and preached about and spoke with political figures (including Louis Philippe I) on the topics. They were also interested in prison reform and abolition, and preached on this topic in France and Germany. Gurney and her husband co-founded Earlham College in 1847, shortly before Joseph's death that year. The couple had three children.

Gurney returned to the United States from England in 1850. In 1851, she settled at West Hill, New Jersey. However, she continued to work as a traveling minister, and again went abroad to preach in England, France, Germany, Italy, and Switzerland. She also continued to meet with political figures to try and incur change; in one instance, she was able to secure the release of a German man imprisoned for his conscientious refusal to bear arms after an audience with the King of Germany.

When not traveling, she hosted evening gatherings at her home in West Hill, which were well-attended by political figures, ministers, and fellow abolitionists.

When the Civil War broke out, Gurney was conflicted, as although she was a pacifist, she wanted the North to win. She visited then-President Abraham Lincoln at the White House on October 26, 1862, along with fellow Quakers James Carey, Hannah B. Mott, and John M. Whithall. Gurney continued to exchange letters with Lincoln following the visit, and one of her letters was found in Lincoln's pocket on the night he was assassinated.

Gurney is buried in Burlington, New Jersey.

== Writing ==
Gurney began writing poems in 1811 and continued until at least 1875. She compiled some of her poetry into a collection entitled Heart Utterances at Various Periods of a Chequered Life, which was not published in her lifetime.

In 1852, Gurney wrote a biography of Anna Backhouse, originally only intended for her family.

In 1884, Gurney published a memoir and some of her correspondence.
