= Hugh Gurney =

British diplomat (1878–1968)

Sir Hugh Gurney KCMG MVO
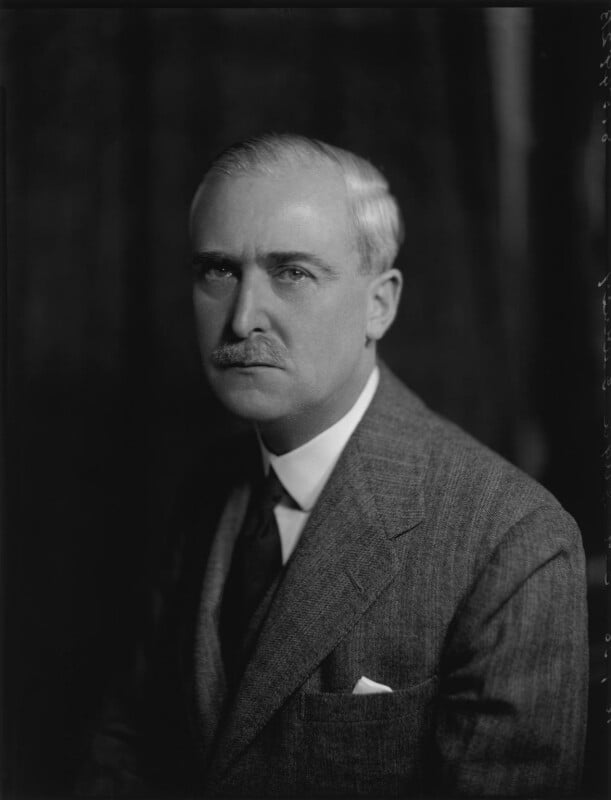
- Gurney in 1936

British Ambassador to Brazil
- In office 1935–1939
- Preceded by: Sir William Seeds
- Succeeded by: Sir Geoffrey Knox

British Ambassador to Denmark
- In office 1933–1935
- Preceded by: Thomas Hohler
- Succeeded by: Hon. Sir Patrick Ramsay

Personal details
- Born: 4 February 1878
- Died: 7 March 1968 (aged 90)
- Spouse(s): Mariota Susan Carnegie (1911-1968, his death)
- Occupation: Diplomat

Sir Hugh Gurney KCMG MVO (4 February 1878 – 7 March 1968) was a British diplomat.

Gurney was the son of John Gurney (1845–1887), a member of the influential Quaker Gurney banking family, and Isabel Blake-Humfrey. He joined the diplomatic service and served in various early postings in Europe. From 1911 he worked as secretary to the British Embassy in Berlin. Following the outbreak of the First World War, he was appointed as First Secretary to the Embassy in Copenhagen on 16 August 1914, where he served through most of the conflict. Gurney was not popular at Copenhagen where he was accused of being timid and lacking in judgement by Ambassador Ralph Paget. When Paget took up the position of Ambassador to Brazil in the summer of 1918, the Foreign Office in London decided to remove Gurney from Copenhagen as well due to his being almost universally disliked by his subordinates. On 10 July 1918 Lord Kilmarnock replaced Gurney as First Secretary. This highly unusual move of replacing the First Secretary at the same time as the Ambassador threatened to cut short Gurney's advancement and diplomatic career, but the crisis eventually passed.

Hugh Gurney returned to Copenhagen as Ambassador to Denmark in his own right in 1933, serving until 1935. He also followed in Paget's footsteps, serving as Ambassador to Brazil from 1935 to 1939. He was appointed a Member of the Royal Victorian Order (MVO) in 1913 on the occasion of the King's visit to Berlin, appointed a Companion of the Order of St Michael and St George (CMG) in the 1918 New Year Honours and promoted to Knight Commander of the Order (KCMG) in the 1935 Birthday Honours.

He married Mariota Susan Carnegie (1892–1980), daughter of Sir Lancelot Douglas Carnegie and Marion Alice de Gourney Barclay, on 3 July 1911. Their children included Isabel Marion Gurney, who married Lord John Kerr, younger brother of Peter Kerr, 12th Marquess of Lothian, and Susan Richenda Gurney, who married (as his second wife) Rodney Elton, 2nd Baron Elton.

Diplomatic posts
Preceded by Sir Thomas Hohler	British Minister to Denmark; 1933–1935	Succeeded by Sir Patrick Ramsay
Preceded by Sir William Seeds	British Ambassador to Brazil; 1935–1939	Succeeded by Sir Geoffrey Knox
