= Elizabeth Fry =

English social reformer (1780–1845)

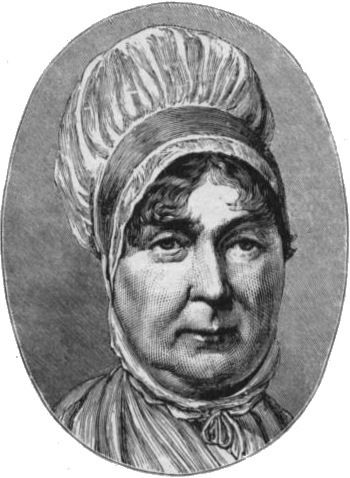
- Born: Elizabeth Gurney; 21 May 1780; Norwich, Norfolk, England
- Died: 12 October 1845 (aged 65); Ramsgate, Kent, England
- Occupations: Social and prison reformer
- Spouse: Joseph Fry (m. 1800)
- Children: 11
- Father: John Gurney
- Relatives: Mary E. Norton; Gurney family; Joseph John Gurney (brother); Louisa Gurney (sister); Samuel Gurney (brother); Daniel Gurney (brother)

Elizabeth Fry (née Gurney; 21 May 1780 – 12 October 1845), sometimes referred to as Betsy Fry, was an English prison reformer, social reformer, philanthropist and Quaker. Fry was a major driving force behind new legislation to improve the treatment of prisoners, especially female inmates, and as such has been called the "Angel of Prisons". She was instrumental in the Gaols Act 1823 which mandated sex-segregation of prisons and female warders for female inmates to protect them from sexual exploitation. Fry kept extensive diaries, in which she wrote explicitly of the need to protect female prisoners from rape and sexual abuse.

She was supported in her efforts by Queen Victoria and by Emperors Alexander I and Nicholas I of Russia; she was in correspondence with both Alexander and Nicholas, their wives, and the Empress Mother. In commemoration of her achievements, she was depicted on the Bank of England £5 note that was in circulation from 2002 until May 2017.

== Background and early life ==
Elizabeth Fry was born into a prominent Quaker family, the Gurneys, at Gurney Court, Norwich. Her childhood family home was Earlham Hall, which has been taken over by the University of East Anglia. Her father, John Gurney, was a partner in Gurney's Bank. Her mother, Catherine, was a member of the Barclay family, who were among the founders of Barclays Bank. Her mother died when Elizabeth was twelve years old.

As one of the oldest girls in the family, Elizabeth was partly responsible for the care and education of the younger children, including her brother Joseph John Gurney, who became a philanthropist and evangelical leader. One of her sisters was Louisa Gurney Hoare, who married and was a writer on education.

== Family life ==
She met Joseph Fry when she was 20 years old. Also a Quaker, he was a banker and a cousin of the Bristol Fry family. After their marriage on 19 August 1800 at the Norwich Goat Lane Friends Meeting House, they moved to St Mildred's Court in the City of London. Elizabeth Fry was recorded in 1811 as a minister of the Religious Society of Friends.

Joseph and Elizabeth Fry lived in Plashet House in East Ham between 1809 and 1829, then moved to The Cedars on Portway in West Ham, where they lived until 1844.

=== Children ===
They had eleven children – five sons and six daughters:

1. Katharine (Kitty) Fry (1801–1886); she wrote A History of the Parishes of East and West Ham (published posthumously, 1888). She did not marry.
2. Rachel Elizabeth Fry (1803–1888); married to Francis Cresswell.
3. John Gurney Fry of Warley Lodge (1804–1872); married to Rachel Reynolds (whose mother was a Barclay).
4. William Storrs Fry (1806–1844); married to Juliana Pelly.
5. Richenda Fry (1808–1884); married to Foster Reynolds.
6. Joseph Fry (1809–1896); married to Alice Partridge.
7. Elizabeth (Betsy) Fry (1811–1816); died aged 5 years.
8. Hannah Fry (1812–1895); married to William Champion Streatfeild.
9. Louisa Fry (1814–1896); married to Raymond Pelly (brother of Juliana, William's wife).
10. Samuel Fry (1816–1902; known as "Gurney"); married to Sophia Pinkerton (aunt of poet and translator Percy Edward Pinkerton).
11. Daniel Fry (1821–1892; known as "Henry" or "Harry"); married to Lucy Sheppard.

== Humanitarian work ==
=== Awakening concern ===
According to her diary, Elizabeth Fry was moved by the preaching of Priscilla Hannah Gurney, Deborah Darby, and William Savery. She had more religious feelings than her immediate family. Prompted by a family friend, Stephen Grellet, Fry visited Newgate Prison in 1813. The conditions she saw there horrified her. Newgate prison was overcrowded with women and children, some of whom had not even received a trial. The prisoners did their own cooking and washing in the small cells in which they slept on straw. Newgate was also the last stop for many before being deported to Australia, in ships that Fry described—in 1814, 20 years before the abolition of slavery—as little better than slave ships. She returned the following day with food and clothes for some prisoners.

Fry was unable to personally further her work for nearly four years after that because of difficulties within the Fry family, including the financial ills of the Fry bank owned by her husband and his brother William. During the 1812 financial panic in the City of London, William Fry had lent a large amount of the bank's money to his wife's family, undermining the bank's solvency. Elizabeth Fry's brother John Gurney, brother-in-law Samuel Hoare III, and cousin Hudson Gurney made a large investment in the W.S. Fry & Sons bank to stabilise its situation.

=== Prison reform and prisoner rehabilitation ===
Fry returned to her project in 1816, and was eventually able to fund a prison school for the children who were imprisoned with their mothers. Rather than attempt to impose discipline on the women, she suggested rules and then asked the prisoners to vote on them. In 1817, she helped found the Association for the Reformation of the Female Prisoners in Newgate. This association provided materials for women so that they could learn to sew patchwork, which was calming for the women and also helped them develop skills such as needlework and knitting; this opened up a prospect, when in future they were released from prison, of them entering employment and earning money for themselves. This approach was copied elsewhere and led to the eventual creation of the British Ladies' Society for Promoting the Reformation of Female Prisoners in 1821. She also promoted the idea of rehabilitation instead of harsh punishment which was taken on by the city authorities in London as well as many other authorities and prisons.

"A Committee of the House of Commons was appointed to examine into evidence respecting the prisons of the metropolis" and Elizabeth Fry was called to give evidence on 27 February 1818. It is believed that she was the first woman ever to be called to give evidence to a Select Committee of the Houses of Parliament.

The passing of the Gaols Act in 1823 had a limited effect on prison conditions. It was largely ineffective, as it contained no mechanism to ensure its provisions were followed; some institutions, such as town gaols and debtors' prisons, were not regulated by the Act. The one change widely and successfully adopted was the separation of male from female inmates. Fry, whose ideas and representations had been influential in the drafting and passage of the Act, was well aware of the shortcomings in its implementation. She gave evidence to a Select Committee of the House of Lords in 1835, saying of prisons in England and Wales, that, despite the Gaols Act, "in many instances their condition is melancholy...they may truly be called schools for crime" and that some still had "no instruction, no employment, no classification [of inmates]...and they get into a most low and deplorable state of morals...I would not say that all are in that condition, but I fear many are". Only with the passing of the Prisons Act 1835 were prison inspectors appointed, and all gaols and prisons brought under central control.

=== Penal transportation ===
The death penalty was common for even minor offences. Initially giving what comfort she could to those facing death, Fry worked to get death sentences commuted to deportation to Australia. By 1818 Hannah Bevan, Elizabeth Pryor, Elizabeth Hanbury, and Katherine Fry were visiting convict ships, providing the female convicts comforts for the voyage, and promoting measures for the fulfilling and useful occupation for the women and education for their children. (Later, Elizabeth Pryor was censured by the Ladies' Society, after she asked the government authorities for remuneration for her years of unpaid work.)

Fry campaigned for the rights and welfare of prisoners who were being transported. Women from Newgate Prison on their way to the ships were being taken through the streets of London in open carts, often in chains, huddled together with their few possessions. They were pelted with rotten food and filth by the people of the city. Fear of what was about to happen was often enough to cause riots among the women condemned to transportation, on the evening before they were to go. Fry persuaded the governor of the prison to send the women in closed carriages and spare them this last indignity before transportation, with Fry and the other women of the Ladies' Society accompanying those transports to the docks. She visited prison ships and persuaded captains to implement systems to ensure each woman and child would at least get a share of food and water on the long journey. Later she arranged for each woman to be given packages of material and sewing tools so that they could use the long journey to make quilts and have something to sell, as well as useful skills, when they reached their destination. She also included a bible, and useful items such as string and knives and forks, in this vital care package. Fry also lobbied for better conditions for the women who had already been transported to the colonies of New South Wales and Van Diemen's Land, including aspects of the factories that they worked in.

Fry visited 106 transport ships and saw 12,000 convicts. Her work helped to start a movement for the abolition of transportation. Transportation was officially abolished in 1868; however, Elizabeth Fry was still visiting transportation ships until 1843.

=== Widening prison reform ===
Fry wrote in her book Prisons in Scotland and the North of England that she stayed the night in some of the prisons and invited nobility to come and stay and see for themselves the conditions prisoners lived in. Her kindness helped her gain the friendship of the prisoners and they began to try to improve their conditions for themselves. Thomas Fowell Buxton, Fry's brother-in-law, was elected to Parliament for Weymouth and began to promote her work among his fellow MPs. In 1818 Fry gave evidence to a House of Commons committee on the conditions prevalent in British prisons, becoming the first woman to present evidence in that house of Parliament.

Fry saw her friend Stephen Grellet and another Quaker, William Allen, off at the docks on their own journey in the cause of prison reform in the autumn of 1818. Having met the Emperor Alexander I in London in 1814, they travelled to visit the prisons of his empire. They had the backing of a letter from the emperor commanding his subjects to cooperate with these English Quakers. They departed for home from Odessa in July 1819. Both men wrote of this mission in their journals, where they also give accounts of their work with Fry.

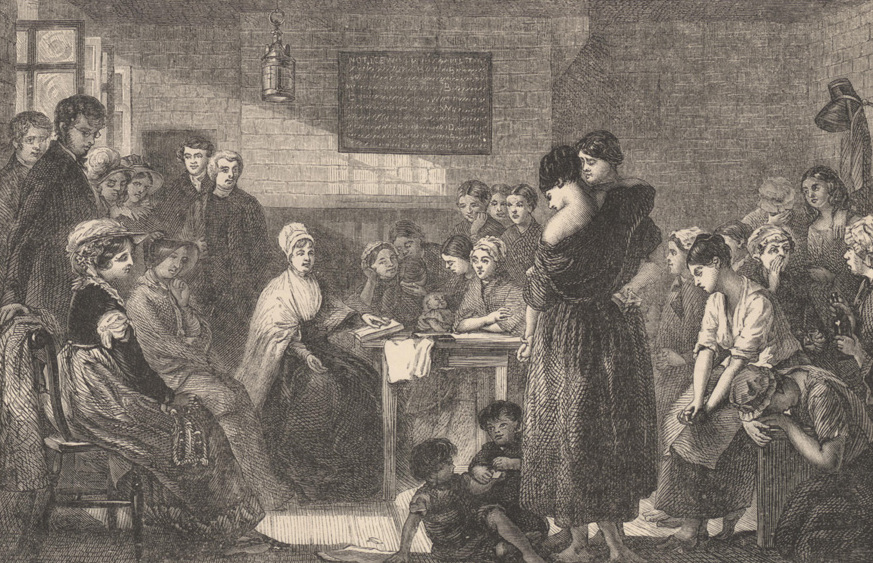
Fry reading to inmates in Newgate prison

In 1827, Fry visited women's prisons and other places of female confinement in Ireland. She encouraged the women of Belfast to organise their own committee to improve conditions in the women's poorhouse.

After her husband went bankrupt in 1828, Fry's brother became her business manager and benefactor. Thanks to him, her work went on and expanded. Later, in 1838, the Friends sent a party to France. Fry and her husband, as well as Lydia Irving, and abolitionists Josiah Forster and William Allen were among the people sent. They were there on other business but despite the language barrier, Fry and Lydia Irving visited French prisons.

=== Welfare and homelessness ===
Elizabeth Fry also helped the homeless, establishing a "nightly shelter" in London after seeing the body of a young boy in the winter of 1819–1820. In 1824, during a visit to Brighton, she instituted the Brighton District Visiting Society. The society arranged for volunteers to visit the homes of the poor and provide help and comfort to them. The plan was successful and was duplicated in other districts and towns across Britain.

In 1840 Fry opened a training school for nurses in Guy's Hospital known as 'The Institution of Nursing Sisters'. Her programme inspired Florence Nightingale, who took a team of Fry's nurses to assist wounded soldiers in the Crimean War. Eliza Mackenzie, who travelled to Therapia to work as a Superintendent of nurses for the Admiralty during the Crimean War, also took three Fry nurses. Her programme of nurse training also inspired Theodor Fliedner who visited her in London and set up something similar in Kaiserswerth, near Düsseldorf.

=== Slavery ===
After the abolition of the slave trade in the British Empire, slavery remained in European colonies. Thomas Fowell Buxton became a leader in its abolition. Elizabeth Fry in particular campaigned for abolition in Danish and Dutch colonies.

=== Reputation ===
One admirer was Queen Victoria, who granted her an audience several times before she was Queen and contributed money to her cause after she ascended to the throne. Another admirer was Robert Peel who passed several acts to further her cause including the Gaols Act 1823 (4 Geo. 4. c. 64).

In 1842, Frederick William IV of Prussia went to see Fry in Newgate Prison during an official visit to Great Britain. The King of Prussia, who had met the social reformer during her previous tours of the continent promoting welfare change and humanitarianism, was so impressed by her work that he told his reluctant courtiers that he would personally visit the gaol when he was in London.

== Death and legacy ==
Fry died from a stroke in Ramsgate, Kent, on 12 October 1845, aged 65. Her remains were buried in the Friends' burial ground at Barking. Seamen of the Ramsgate Coast Guard flew their flag at half mast in respect for Fry, a practice that until this occasion had been officially reserved for the death of a ruling monarch. More than a thousand people stood in silence during the burial at the Ramsgate memorial.

=== Elizabeth Fry Refuge ===
With the intention of organising a suitable memorial to Fry, a meeting was held in June 1846, chaired by the Lord Mayor of London. Some early proposals for a statue of Fry—to be placed perhaps in either Westminster Abbey or St Paul's Cathedral—had already been floated. Instead, it was recommended to the meeting that a practical commemoration of her life would be more fitting. Lord Ashley, amongst a group of prominent reformers and admirers of Fry, including the Bishop of Norwich and the diplomat Christian von Bunsen, promoting adoption of a charitable scheme to honour Fry, told the meeting that founding an asylum would be in "perfect harmony with her life, her character, her feelings". Such a project would stand for the nation's gratitude to her and "the sympathy they entertain for her righteous endeavours".

The proposal met with general support and the first Elizabeth Fry refuge opened its doors in 1849 in the London Borough of Hackney —initially in a temporary location and then, from 1860, in a fine late-17th-century town house nearby at 195 Mare Street, which the refuge purchased and occupied for the next half century. It was intended to provide temporary shelter for young women discharged from metropolitan gaols or police offices. Funding came via subscriptions from various city companies and private individuals, supplemented by income from the inmates' laundry and needlework. Such training was an important part of the refuge's work.

In 1924, the refuge merged with the Manor House Refuge for the Destitute, in Dalston in Hackney. The hostel soon moved to larger premises in Highbury, Islington and then, in 1958, to Reading, where it remains today. The original building in Hackney became the CIU New Lansdowne Club but became vacant in 2000 and has fallen into disrepair. Hackney Council, in 2009, was leading efforts to restore the building and bring it back into use. The building did undergo substantial refurbishment work in 2012 but as of July 2013, the entire building is for sale. The building and Elizabeth Fry are commemorated by a plaque at the entrance gateway.

=== Memorials ===
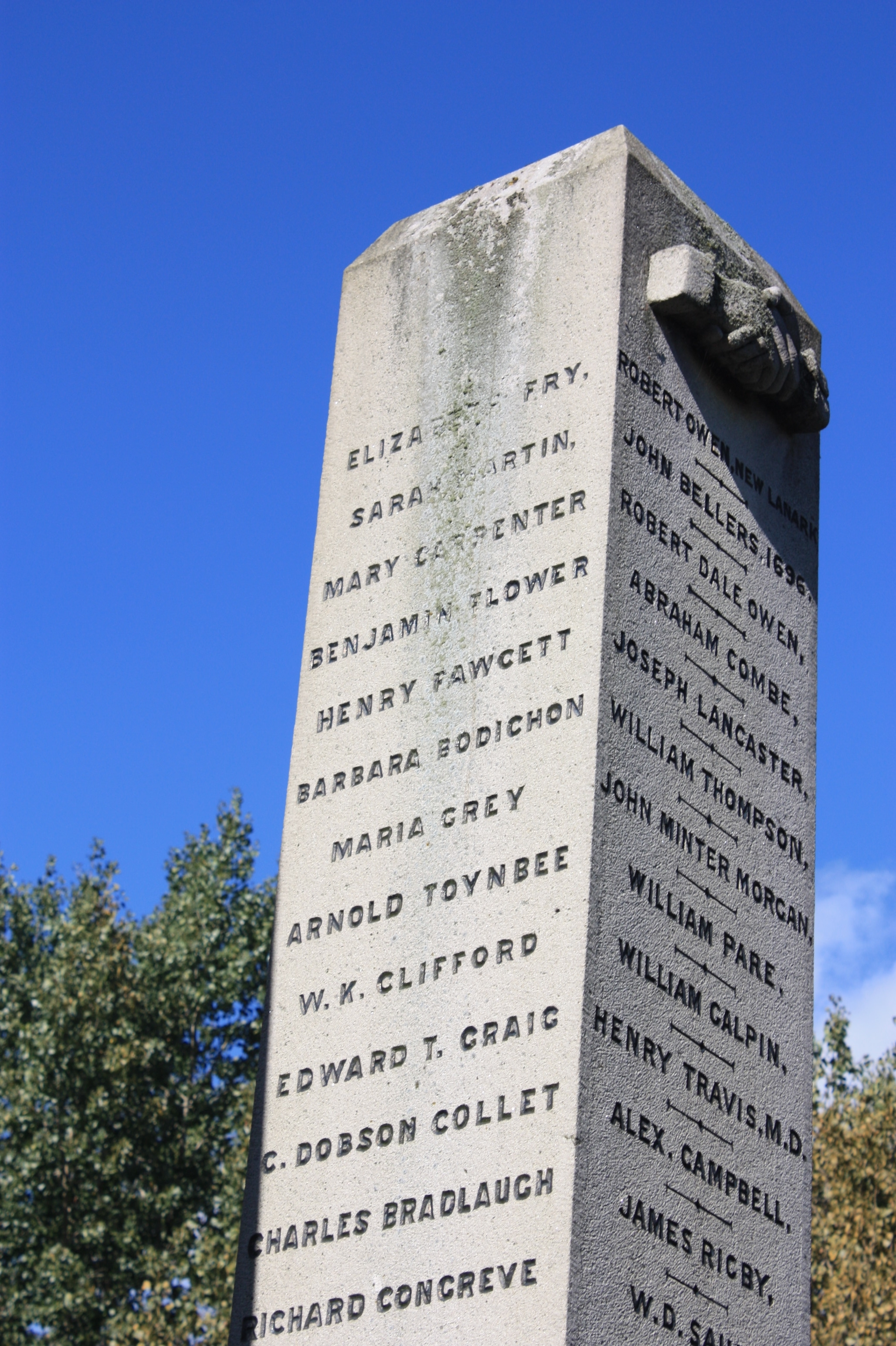
Elizabeth Fry's name on the Reformers’ Monument, Kensal Green Cemetery

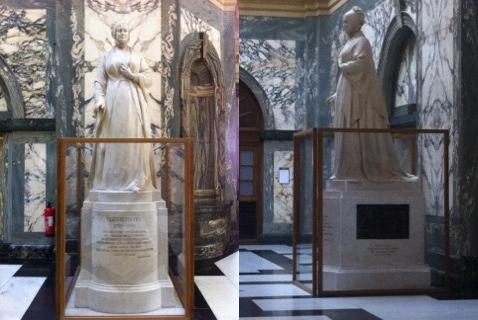
Fry's statue in the Old Bailey

There are a number of memorials which commemorate places where Fry lived. There are plaques located at her birthplace of Gurney Court in Norwich; her childhood home of Earlham Hall; St. Mildred's Court, City of London, where she lived when she was first married; and Arklow House, her final home and place of death in Ramsgate. Her name heads the list on the southern face of the Reformers' Monument in Kensal Green Cemetery, London. She is depicted in stained glass at All Saints' Church, Cambridge alongside Edith Cavell and Josephine Butler.

Due to her work as a prison reformer, there are several memorials to Elizabeth Fry. One of the buildings which make up the Home Office headquarters, 2 Marsham Street, is named after her. She is also commemorated in prisons and courthouses, including a terracotta bust in the gatehouse of HM Prison Wormwood Scrubs and a stone statue in the Old Bailey. The Canadian Association of Elizabeth Fry Societies honours her memory by advocating for women who are in the criminal justice system. They also celebrate and promote a National Elizabeth Fry Week in Canada each May.

Fry is also commemorated in a number of educational and care-based settings. The University of East Anglia's School of Social Work and Psychology is housed in a building named after her. There is an Elizabeth Fry Ward at Scarborough General Hospital in North Yorkshire, United Kingdom. A road is named for Fry at Guilford College, a school in Greensboro, North Carolina, which was founded by Quakers. There is a bust of Elizabeth Fry located in East Ham Library, in the London Borough of Newham, and East Ham also has streets named Elizabeth Road and Fry Road (after her), and Katherine Road (after her daughter).

Quakers also acknowledge Elizabeth Fry as a prominent member. Her grave at the former Society of Friends Burial Ground, located off Whiting Avenue in Barking, Essex, was restored and received a new commemorative marble plinth in October 2003. In February 2007, a plaque was erected in her honour at the Friends Meeting House in Upper Goat Lane, Norwich. Fry is also depicted in the Quaker Tapestry, on panels E5 and E6. The Elizabeth Fry room at Friends House, London is named after her.

She is also honoured by other Christian denominations. In the Lady Chapel of Manchester's Anglican Cathedral, one of the portrait windows of Noble Women on the west wall of the Chapel features Elizabeth Fry. Fry is remembered in the Church of England with a commemoration on 12 October.

Lydia Sigourney met Mrs. Fry at Newgate in 1840 and wrote the poem Mrs. Fry at Newgate Prison in her honour, this being published in her volume, Pleasant Memories of Pleasant Lands, in 1842.

From 2001 to 2016, Fry was depicted on the reverse of £5 notes issued by the Bank of England. She was shown reading to prisoners at Newgate Prison. The design also incorporated a key, representing the key to the prison which was awarded to Fry in recognition of her work. However, as of 2016, Fry's image on these notes was replaced by that of Winston Churchill. She was one of the social reformers honoured on an issue of UK commemorative stamps in 1976.

There is a road in Johannesburg, South Africa named Elizabeth Fry Street after Fry.

Fry's extensive diaries have been transcribed and studied.

== Selected works ==
- (1827) Observations on the visiting, superintendence and government, of female prisoners
- (1831) Texts for every day in the year, principally practical & devotional
- (1841) An address of Christian counsel and caution to emigrants to newly-settled colonies

== See also ==
- Elizabeth Fry Retreat, Melbourne, Australia
- John Howard
- Howard League for Penal Reform
- Daniel Wheeler
- Congénies
- Sarah Martin
- June Rose

== Bibliography and further reading ==
- Anderson, George M. "Elizabeth Fry: timeless reformer." America 173 (Fall 1995): 22–3.
- Clay, Walter Lowe. The Prison Chaplain. Montclair. New Jersey: Patterson Smith, 1969.
- Fairhurst, James. "The Angel of Prisons." Ireland's Own 4539 (Fall 1996):5.
- Fry, E., & Ryder, E. (1883). Elizabeth Fry: Philanthropist, preacher, prison-reformer: Life and labors / taken from the Memoir edited by her daughters, including her journal and from other sources, by Edward Ryder. Pawling, NY: P.H. Smith. MMSID 991006613419702626
- Fry, Katherine. Memoir of the Life of Elizabeth Fry. Montclair, NJ: Patterson Smith, 1974. 2nd ed., 1848.
- Hatton, Jean. Betsy, the dramatic biography of a prison reformer. Oxford UK & Grand Rapids, Michigan, Monarch Books, 2005. (ISBN 1-85424-705-0 (UK), ISBN 0-8254-6092-1 (US)).
- Johnson, Spencer. The Value of Kindness: The Story of Elizabeth Fry. 2nd ed. 1976. (ISBN 0-916392-09-0)
- Kent, J. H. S. (1962). Elizabeth Fry (Makers of Britain). London: Batsford. MMSID 991009174159702626
- Lewis, Georgina. Elizabeth Fry. London: Headley Brothers, 1909. MMSID 991013186339702626
- Pitman, E.R. Elizabeth Fry. Boston, Mass.: Roberts Brothers, 1886.
- Rose, June. Elizabeth Fry, a biography. London & Basingstoke: Macmillan, 1980. (ISBN 0-333-31921-4) reprinted 1994 by Quaker Home Service ISBN 0-85245-260-8.
- Rose, June. Prison Pioneer: The Story of Elizabeth Fry. Quaker Tapestry Booklets, 1994.
- Timpson, Thomas. Memoir of Mrs. Elizabeth Fry London: Aylott & Jones, 1847.
- Whitney, Janet. Elizabeth Fry: Quaker Heroine. London: George Harrap & Co. Ltd., 1937, New York: Benjamin Blom, 1972.
