= Sam Hoare =

Sam Hoare may refer to:

- Sam Hoare (actor) (born 1981), British actor and director
- Sam Hoare (rugby league), Australian rugby league footballer for the North Queensland Cowboys
- Samuel Hoare, 1st Viscount Templewood, British politician and diplomat

== See also ==
- Samuel Hoare (disambiguation)
