= Sir Samuel Hoare, 1st Baronet =

British politician (1841-1915)

Samuel Hoare
- Hoare in 1895

Member of Parliament for Norwich
- In office 1886–1906 Serving with Jeremiah Colman (1886-1895); Harry Bullard (1895–1904); Louis Tillett (1904-1906)
- Preceded by: Harry Bullard; Jeremiah Colman
- Succeeded by: George Roberts; Louis Tillett

Personal details
- Born: 7 September 1841
- Died: 20 January 1915 (aged 73)
- Party: Conservative
- Spouse: Katherine Louisa Hart Davis (m. 1866)
- Children: 7
- Parents: John Gurney Hoare (father); Caroline Barclay (mother)
- Relatives: Louisa Gurney (paternal grandmother); John Gurney (great grandfather); Samuel Hoare (great grandfather)
- Education: Bayfield Preparatory School, Harrow School
- Alma mater: Trinity College, Cambridge

Sir Samuel Hoare, 1st Baronet (7 September 1841 – 20 January 1915), was an English Conservative Party politician who sat in the House of Commons from 1886 to 1906.

== Family ==
Hoare was the eldest son of John Gurney Hoare (1810–1875) and Caroline Barclay (d. 1878) and a grandson of the diarist Louisa Gurney. His great-grandfathers included the Quaker bankers John Gurney and Samuel Hoare.

In 1866, he married Katherine Louisa Hart Davis (1846–1931), with whom he had seven children, including his heir Samuel John Gurney Hoare and the translator Muriel Press.

== Education and career ==
Hoare was educated at Bayfield Preparatory School, Harrow School and Trinity College, Cambridge, where he played cricket in the University trials; he also played for Quidnuncs. He undertook two tours of the Mediterranean and Middle East between 1862 and 1865.

At the 1885 general election he unsuccessfully contested North Norfolk. He was elected as a Member of Parliament (MP) for Norwich at a by-election in April 1886, and retained the seat until he stood down at the 1906 general election.

== Baronetcy ==
In 1880, Hoare purchased Sidestrand Hall in Sidestrand, Norfolk, from the Spurrell family.

On 7 August 1899, the Hoare baronetcy, of Sidestrand Hall, was created for him. On his death in 1915, the title passed to his elder son, Samuel John Gurney Hoare, who held several Cabinet positions in the 1930s and was elevated to the peerage as Viscount Templewood in 1944.

Coat of arms of Sir Samuel Hoare, 1st Baronet
Crest In front of a stag’s head erased Argent three crosses couped fesswise Sable. Escutcheon Sable an eagle displayed with two heads between three crosses couped within a bordure indented all Argent. Motto Venit Hora

Parliament of the United Kingdom
Preceded by Harry Bullard; Jeremiah Colman	Member of Parliament for Norwich; 1886 – 1906; With: Jeremiah Colman to 1895; Harry Bullard 1895–1904; Louis Tillett from 1904	Succeeded by George Roberts; Louis Tillett
Baronetage of the United Kingdom
New creation	Baronet (of Sidestrand Hall); 1899–1915	Succeeded by Samuel Hoare
