= Thomas Richardson (businessman) =

British businessman

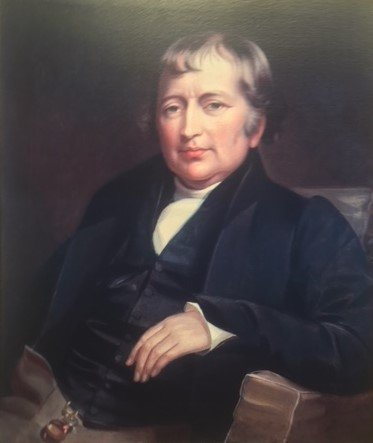

Thomas Richardson (1771–1853) was a shareholder and director of the Stockton & Darlington Railway, a partner in Robert Stephenson & Co. and a founding member of the Owners of the Middlesbrough Estate. He was also a founder of Richardson, Overend and Company, later renamed Overend, Gurney and Company.

== Background ==
Thomas Richardson, a bill broker and Quaker from Stamford Hill, London, was the cousin of Edward Pease. Pease proposed the Stockton & Darlington Railway (S&DR) in 1818, and Richardson invested in the scheme, owning fifty £100 shares by 1823. Elected to the S&DR management committee, Richardson also became a partner in the locomotive manufacturers Robert Stephenson & Co. in 1823. The S&DR suffered financial difficulties in the first few years of operation, Richardson guaranteeing £10,000 of the debt in October 1825. By 1830 Richardson owned 141 S&DR shares; Richardson was also director of companies such as the Middlesbrough and Redcar and Wear Valley Railway, which were formed to expand the S&DR.

Soon after opening the export of coal had become the S&DR main business, but the facilities at the port in Stockton proved inadequate. A branch to a new port at Middlesbrough, south of the Tees, was approved by S&DR shareholders on 26 October 1827. Before May 1929 Richardson had bought 500 acres (200 ha) near Port Darlington from William Chilton of Billingham, and with Joseph and Edward Pease and others he formed the Owners of the Middlesbrough Estate to develop it. Middlesbrough had only a few houses before the coming of the railway, but a year later had a population of over 2,000 and at the 2011 census had over 138,000 people.

In 1844 he retired to North Riding of Yorkshire, selling all but 10 shares in the S&DR.
