= Isabel Talbot, Baroness Talbot de Malahide =

English philanthropist (1851–1932)

The Right Honourable The Lady Talbot de Malahide DBE

President of the Irish Joint Red Cross and St John Executive Committee
- In office c. 1914 – c. 1918

Personal details
- Born: Isabel Charlotte Blake-Humfrey; 20 December 1851 Wroxham House, Wroxham, Norfolk, England
- Died: 22 February 1932 (aged 80)
- Occupation: Philanthropist

Isabel Charlotte Talbot, Baroness Talbot de Malahide, DBE (née Blake-Humfrey; formerly Gurney; 20 December 1851 – 22 February 1932) was an English philanthropist.

She was born at Wroxham House, Norfolk, the daughter of Robert Blake-Humfrey, a retired army officer who had lost a leg at the Battle of the Nive in 1813, and his wife Charlotte. In 1871, she married John Gurney, a wealthy Norwich banker from the Gurney family of Earlham Hall, connected to many social reformers. She and her husband were deeply involved in many educational and philanthropic projects in Norwich, including the conversion of Norwich Castle into the city museum. He was a Justice of the Peace and the mayor of Norwich. With his health failing, in 1886 the couple moved to Cannes, France, where he died the following year, aged 41.

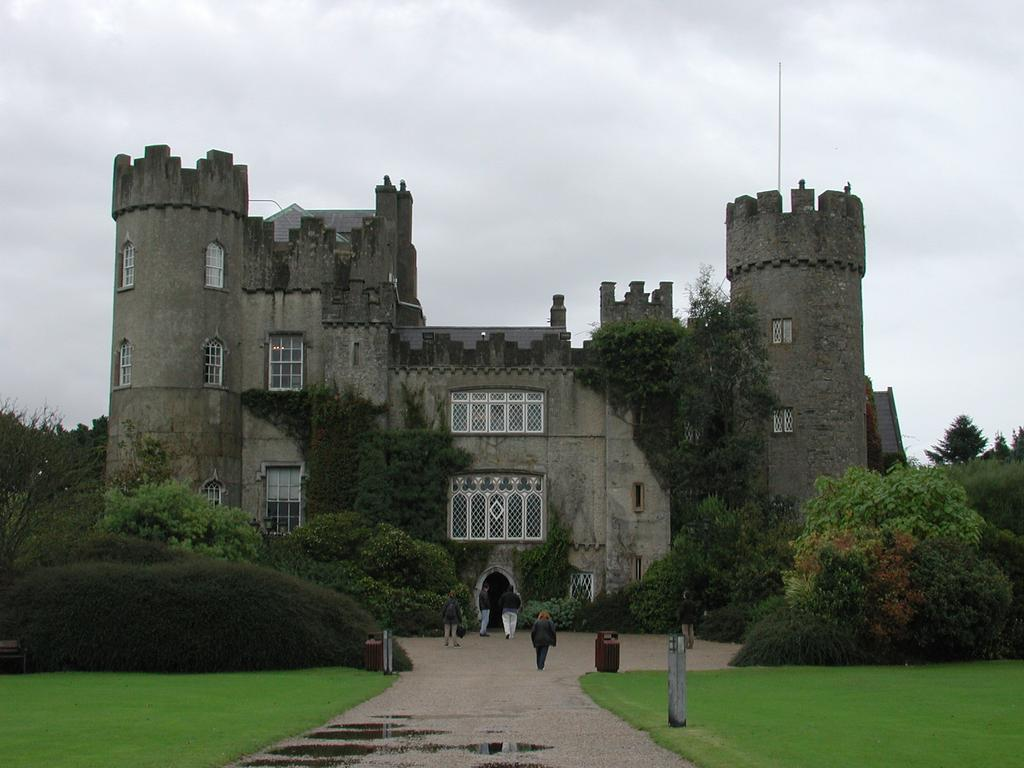
Malahide Castle

She returned to their home at Sprowston Hall and lived there until 1898, when she moved to Grosvenor Place, London, and became a notable hostess. In December 1901, she married Richard Wogan Talbot, 5th Baron Talbot de Malahide (1846–1921), and moved to his home at Malahide Castle, County Dublin, where she continued her philanthropic work. During the First World War, she served as president of the County of Dublin Branch of the British Red Cross Society and the Irish Joint Red Cross and St John Executive Committee. For this work she was appointed Dame Commander of the Order of the British Empire (DBE) in the 1920 civilian war honours. During the war, she was also a member of the Irish Central Committee for the Employment of Women.

Lord Talbot de Malahide died in 1921 and his widow moved back to London. She became heavily involved with the Women's Institute and founded a branch (and served as its president) near her country home at Compton Regis, near Shrivenham, Berkshire.

Lady Talbot was a talented artist in both watercolour and oils. She published two books, Foundations of National Glory and Golden Opportunities. She had five sons and two daughters by her first marriage. They included Sir Eustace Gurney, diplomat Hugh Gurney and scientist Robert Gurney.
