= Viscount Templewood =

Extinct viscountcy in the Peerage of the United Kingdom

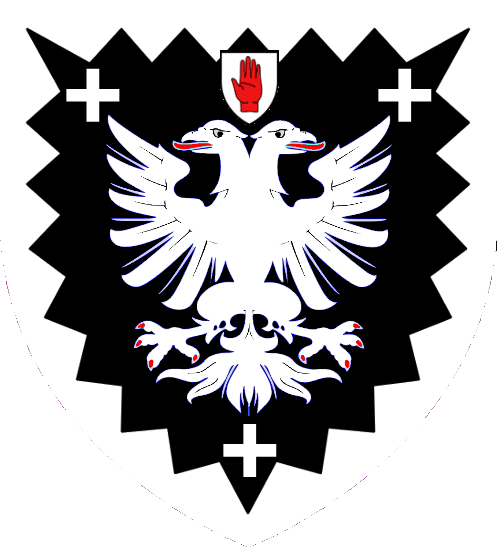
- Crest: In front of a stag’s head erased Argent three crosses couped fesswise Sable.
- Shield: Sable an eagle displayed with two heads between three crosses couped within a bordure indented all Argent.
- Supporters: (Viscount only) On either side a stag Or charged on the neck with a cross couped Sable.
- Motto: Venit Hora

Viscount Templewood, of Chelsea in the County of Middlesex, was a title in the Peerage of the United Kingdom. It was created on 14 July 1944 for the Conservative politician and former Foreign Secretary and Home Secretary, Sir Samuel Hoare, 2nd Baronet. The Hoare Baronetcy, of Sidestrand Hall in the County of Norfolk, had been created in the Baronetage of the United Kingdom on 7 August 1899 for his father Samuel Hoare, who represented Norwich in the House of Commons. Both titles became extinct on Lord Templewood's death in 1959.

The name Templewood was that of a country house at Sidestrand. Templewood was built in 1938 by architects John Seely and Paul Paget.

== Hoare baronets, of Sidestrand Hall (1899) ==
- Sir Samuel Hoare, 1st Baronet (1841–1915)
- Sir Samuel John Gurney Hoare, 2nd Baronet (1880–1959) (created Viscount Templewood in 1944)

== Viscounts Templewood (1944) ==
- Samuel John Gurney Hoare, 1st Viscount Templewood (1880–1959)

== See also ==
- Hoare baronets
- Samuel Hoare Jr

Baronetage of the United Kingdom
Preceded by Brooke baronets	Hoare baronets of Sidestrand Hall; 7 August 1899	Succeeded by Salt baronets
