= Joseph John Gurney =

British banker and Quaker minister (1788–1847)

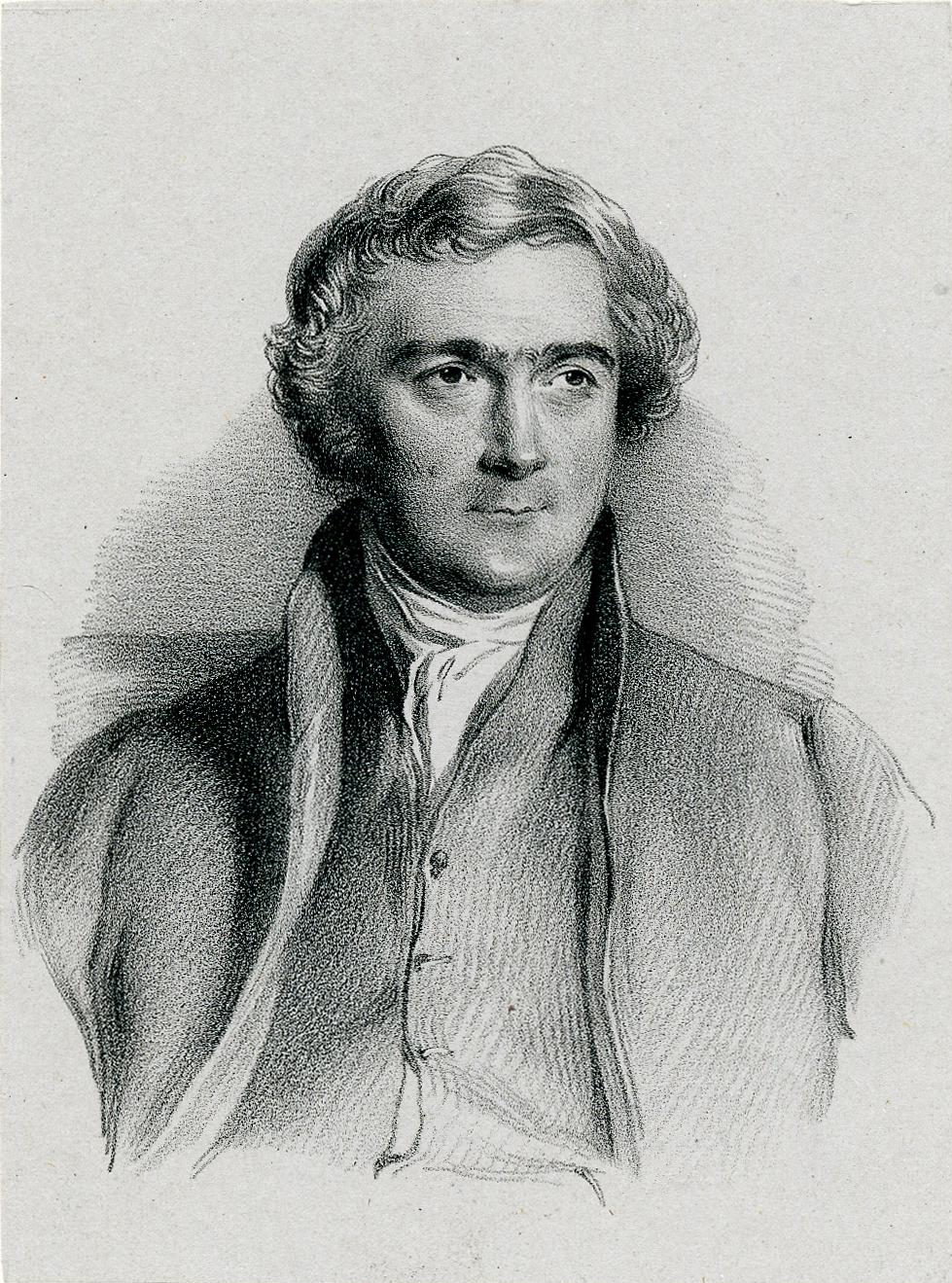
- Print after a portrait by George Richmond, 1847
- Born: 2 August 1788; Earlham Hall, Norfolk, England
- Died: 4 January 1847 (aged 58)
- Spouse: Eliza Paul Kirkbride Gurney (m. 1841)
- Children: 4, including John Henry Gurney Sr. (Note: Two of their children were stillborn)

Joseph John Gurney (2 August 1788 – 4 January 1847) was a banker in Norwich, England, and a member of the Gurney family of that city. He became an evangelical minister of the Religious Society of Friends (Quakers), whose views and actions led, ultimately, to a schism among American Quakers. Followers of his beliefs were known as Gurneyites.

== Biography ==
Gurney was born at Earlham Hall near Norwich (now part of the University of East Anglia), the tenth child of John Gurney of Gurney's Bank. He was always called Joseph John. He was the brother of Samuel Gurney, Elizabeth Fry (née Gurney), a prison and social reformer, and Louisa Hoare (née Gurney), a writer on education, and also the brother-in-law – through his sister the campaigner Hannah Buxton – of Thomas Fowell Buxton, who was also an anti-slavery campaigner.

In September 1837 Gurney met Eliza Paul Kirkbride while returning from England. The two worked together during his trips to the United States, and Kirkbride joined Gurney in preaching in favor of prison reform, pacifism, and the abolition of slavery. Gurney married Kirkbride in October 1841.

Gurney also advocated total abstinence from alcohol. He wrote a tract on the subject called Water Is Best.

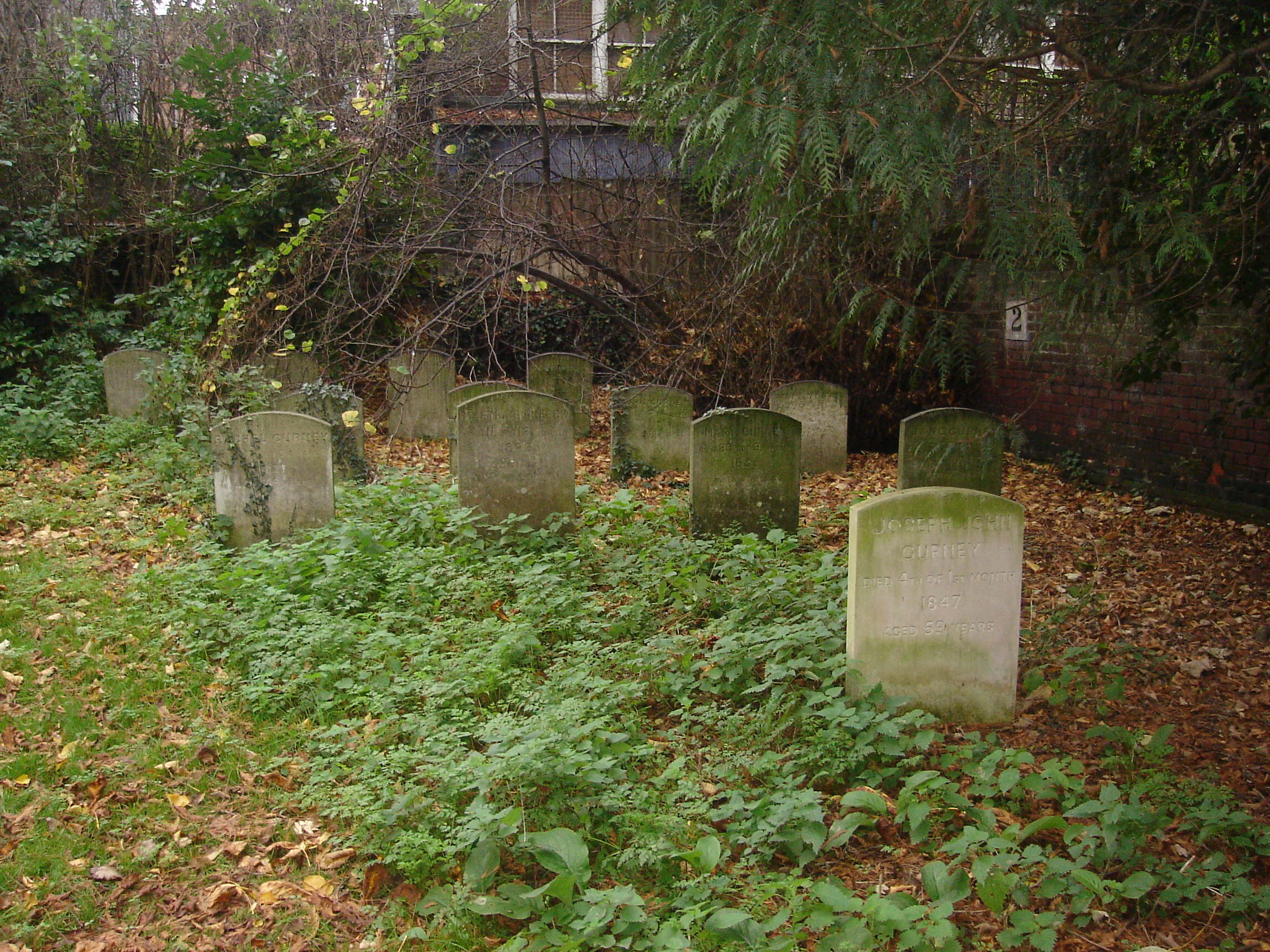
Joseph John Gurney's grave (right) in the Gurney family burial plot at Gildencroft Quaker Cemetery, Norwich.

As a boy George Borrow used to fish the River Yare near Earlham Hall and on one occasion was caught by Joseph John Gurney. Gurney later invited the boy into the hall to see his books. In his semi-autobiographical novel Lavengro, Borrow recalls the hall with great precision: "On the right side is a green level, a smiling meadow, grass of the richest decks the side of the slope; mighty trees also adorn it, giant elms, the nearest of which, when the sun is nigh its meridian, fling a broad shadow upon the face of the ancient brick of an old English Hall. It has a stately look, that old building, indistinctly seen, as it is, among the umbrageous trees."

== Works ==
Joseph John Gurney had written over 80 letters and works, of which include:

- Notes on a visit made to some of the prisons in Scotland and the North of England in company with Elizabeth Fry; with some general observations on the subject of prison discipline (1819)
- Observations on the religious peculiarities of the Religious Society of Friends (1824)
- Essays on the Evidences, Doctrines and Practical Operations of Christianity (1825)
- Brief remarks on the History, Authority and Use of the Sabbath (1831)
- An Essay on War, and on its Lawfulness under the Christian Dispensation (1833) a Peace Society tract
- A Winter in the West Indies (1840)
- Religion and the New Testament (1843)

As well as his memoirs:

- Gurney, Joseph John (1854). Braithwaite, Joseph Bevan (ed.). Memoirs of Joseph John Gurney. With Selections from his Journal and Correspondence. Philadelphia: Lippincott, Grambo & Co. in 2 volumes: vol. 1, vol. 2

== See also ==
- Gurney family (Norwich) – Influential English Quakers in Norwich
- Gurney's bank – Bank formerly based in Norwich, England
