= Gurney family (Norwich) =

Influential English Quakers in Norwich

The Gurneys were an influential family of English Quakers, who had a major part in the development of Norwich, England. They established Gurney's Bank in 1770, which merged into Barclays Bank in 1896. They established successful breweries. A number of family members were abolitionists. Members of the family still live in the United Kingdom.

== History ==
In the 17th century, John Gurney (1655–1721) left his hometown of Maldon for Norwich to live and work among the Quakers of the city. Arriving there in 1667, he became active in the woollen trade. In 1687, he married Elizabeth Swanton (died 1727) of Woodbridge, by whom he had eight children. He died as a wealthy man in 1721, and was buried in "the old Dutch garden that the Friends had bought as their burial ground, the Gildencroft or Buttercup Field", on the land Gurney had received to tend when he first arrived in Norwich. His sons John (1688–1740) and Joseph (1691–1750) continued in the woollen trade in St Augustine's Street and Magdalen Street, respectively. Both were married and had numerous children.

The younger John Gurney's sons, John (1719–1779) and Henry (1721–1777), gradually added banking to their woollen trade. In 1770, they entered into partnership and formally established Gurney's Bank at 35 Tooley Street (now Pitt Street) in Norwich. When Henry died in 1777, he was succeeded by his son Bartlett (1756–1802), who also took over his uncle John's responsibilities and moved the banking business to Redwell Plain (now Bank Plain), Norwich. The Quaker bank became renowned for its honesty, reliability, and fair dealings, so that many people entrusted it with their money for safekeeping. Bartlett Gurney was married twice, but died childless at Coltishall, Norfolk, in 1802. He was succeeded in control of the bank by Richard (1742–1811) and John Gurney (1749–1809), grandsons of Joseph Gurney (1691–1750).

=== Royal links ===
Prince William Frederick, Duke of Gloucester, a staunch advocate of the abolition of slavery and the reform movement, was a regular guest at Earlham Hall in the 1790s, as was fellow abolitionist Amelia Opie whose husband John had painted the Duke's portrait. Louisa and Richenda Gurney wrote glowing accounts of the Duke in their journals, describing him as sociable and agreeable.

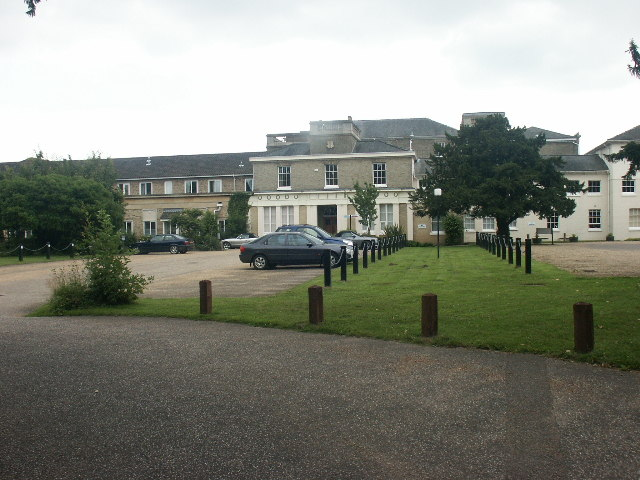
Keswick Hall, residence of Richard Gurney (1742–1811), his son Hudson and many other members of the Gurney family

=== Barclays ===
Richard Gurney married a daughter of David Barclay, another Quaker merchant and banker. Their six children included Anna Gurney, an Old English scholar, and Hudson Gurney (1775–1864), who later inherited wealth from his father and acted as the head of the Norwich Gurney family. He became MP for Newtown, Isle of Wight in 1816, a Fellow of the Royal Society in 1818, and High Sheriff of Norfolk in 1835. He resided at Keswick Hall near Norwich and in St James's Square, London, but stayed childless.

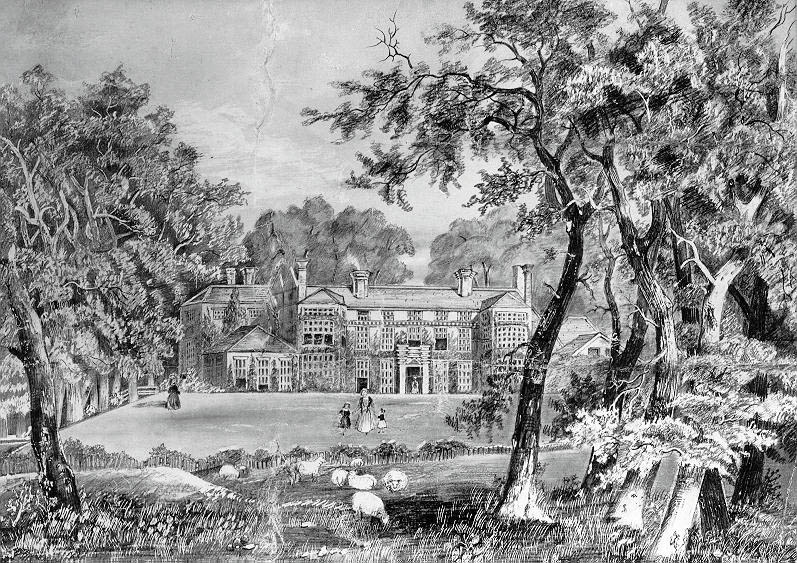
Prince William Frederick, Duke of Gloucester and Edinburgh was a regular guest at Earlham Hall, the Gurney family seat. The Prince and members of the Gurney family were abolitionists

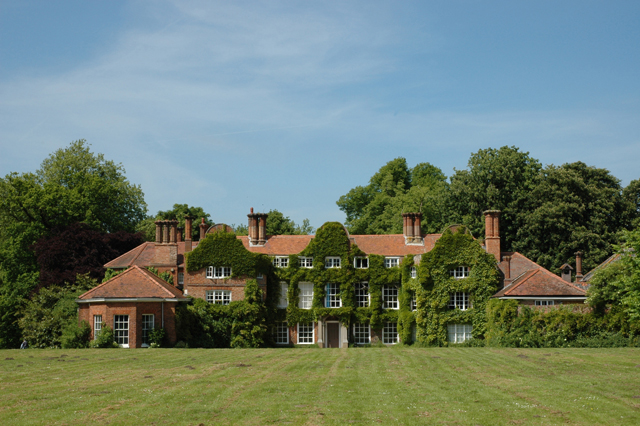
Earlham Hall, residence of John Gurney (1749–1809) and childhood home of his daughter Elizabeth Fry

John Gurney (1749–1809) and his wife lived at Earlham Hall in Norwich, which they rented from the Bacon family. Several of their 13 children died young. The survivors included the bankers Samuel Gurney (1786–1856) and Daniel Gurney (1791–1880), the social reformers Elizabeth Fry and Joseph John Gurney, and the artist Richenda Cunningham. Hannah married Sir Thomas Buxton. Another sister, Louisa Hoare, wrote on education. The 19th-century Gurney family came to personify wealth: Gilbert and Sullivan's 1875 comic opera Trial by Jury has the Judge relate how his wealth increased until "at length I became as rich as the Gurneys."

On John Gurney's death in 1809, his son Samuel assumed control of the Norwich Gurney's Bank. About the same time, he took over the London billbroking business of Richardson, Overend & Company, whose later name was Overend, Gurney and Company. It became the world's largest discounting house for 40 years, but failed – ten years after Samuel Gurney's death – in 1866 with liabilities of £11 million. This failure ruined a number of the Gurneys and many other investors. Gurney's Bank in Norwich, however, escaped major damage to business and reputation from the collapse. The Times "understood that the suspension of Overend, Gurney & Co will not in the slightest degree compromise Gurney's Bank of Norwich. That establishment recently passed into the hands of new partners, whose resources are beyond all question."

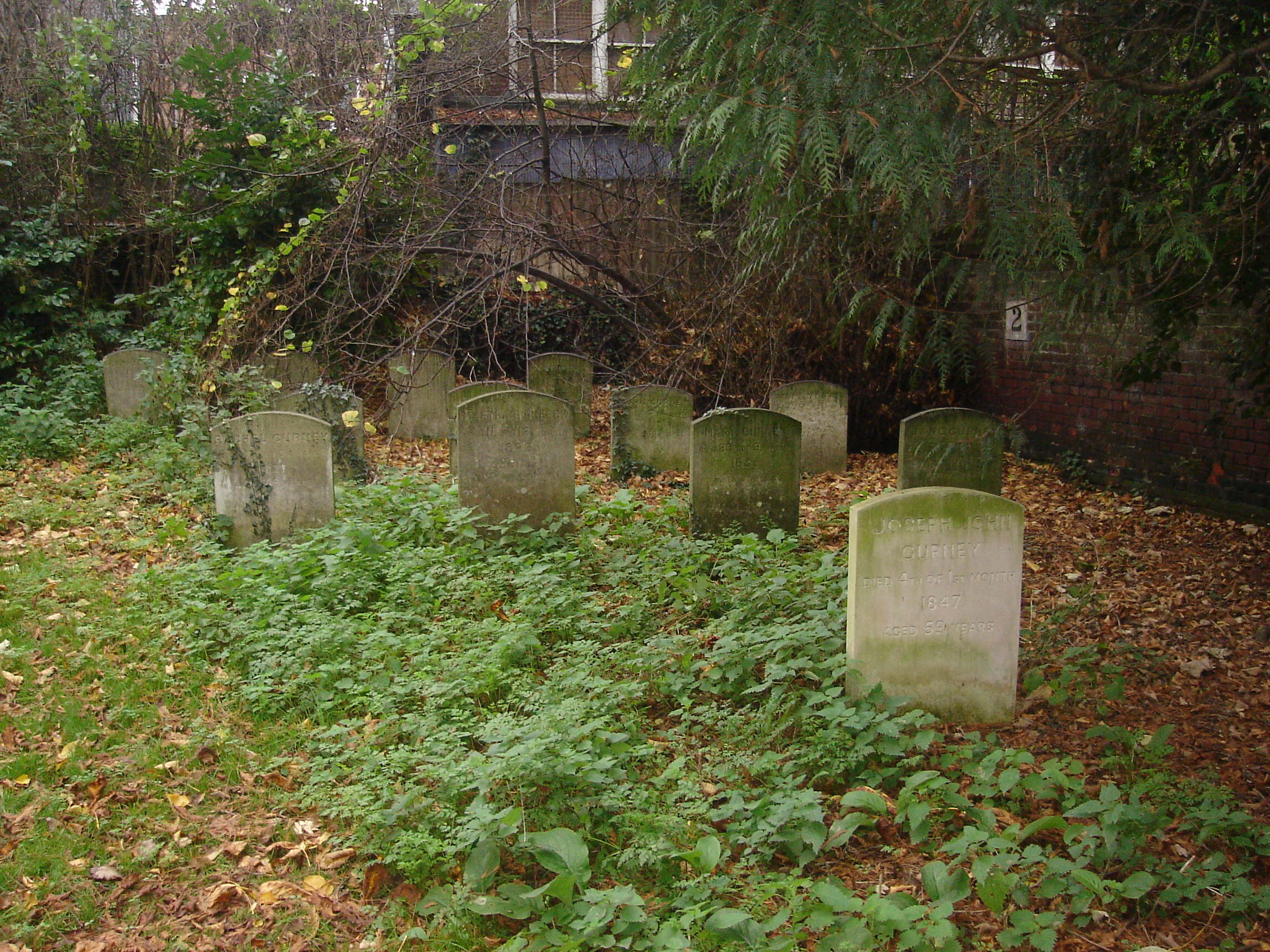
Part of the Gurney family burial plot at Gildencroft Cemetery

Gurney's Bank in Norwich was at that time in the hands of Samuel Gurney's brother Daniel, and of Joseph John Gurney's son John Henry Gurney Sr. (1819–1890). The latter had inherited the bulk of Hudson Gurney's fortune in 1864. He later made a home at Northrepps, near Cromer, where he pursued ornithology. His son, John Henry Gurney Jr., also an ornithologist, and his great-great-grandson, Henry Richard Gurney of Heggatt Hall, continued that tradition. Besides managing his banking business, Daniel Gurney served as High Sheriff of Norfolk in 1853 and took an interest in archaeology and genealogy. In 1848, he printed privately in two volumes an elaborate Record of the House of Gournay, adding a supplement in 1858. Daniel Gurney was married to a daughter of William Hay, 17th Earl of Erroll, and lived near North Runcton, Norfolk. Their daughter Louisa Jane Gurney (1830 - 1867) married Sir Thomas Troubridge, 3rd Baronet. Their son Charles Henry Gurney (1833–1899) graduated from Trinity College, Cambridge, and married a daughter of Henry Thoby Prinsep. Later he became a partner in Saunderson's Bank, London. The Gurneys remained active in banking until 1896, when eleven private banks controlled by Quaker families merged under the name Barclays to meet competition from the joint-stock banks. The largest components of this conglomerate were Barclay Bevan Ransom Tritton Bouverie & Co., of Lombard Street in the City of London, Backhouse's Bank and Gurney's Bank.

Many of the Gurney family are buried in the Gildencroft Quaker Cemetery, Norwich, some in Keswick All Saints churchyard and some in Intwood churchyard, both near Norwich.

== Genealogy ==
John Gurney (1655–1721) married 1687 Elizabeth Swanton (died 1727) and had eight children by her, including John (1688–1740) and Joseph (1691–1750), from whom the banking Gurneys are descended. John's sons founded the bank in 1770 and were succeeded by his grandson Bartlett. After Bartlett Gurney's death in 1802, his cousins took over.

Gurney Family (Norwich)
- John Gurney (1655–1721) married in 1687 Elizabeth Swanton (died 1727).
  - John Gurney (1688–1740) married in 1709 Elizabeth Hadduck (died 1757) and had 12 children, including:
    - John Gurney (1718–1779) co-founder of Gurney's Bank
    - Henry Gurney (1721–1777) co-founder of Gurney's Bank, married in 1749 Elizabeth Bartlett (died 1791) and had 7 children, including:
      - Bartlett Gurney (1756–1802) married first in 1780 Hannah Chapman (died 1798) and secondly Mary Cockell (died 1800), but had no issue.
  - Joseph Gurney (1691–1750) married in 1713 Hannah Middleton (1686–1760) and had 10 children, including:
    - John Gurney (1715–1770) married in 1739 Elizabeth Kett (1718–1788) and had 12 children, including:
      - Richard Gurney (1742–1811) married first in 1773 Agatha Barclay (1753–1776) daughter of David Barclay and secondly in 1779 Rachel Hanbury (1763–1825), and had 6 children, including:
        - Hudson Gurney (1775–1864) married in 1809 Margaret Barclay-Allardice (died 1855).
        - Anna Gurney (1795–1857) Old English scholar
      - John Gurney (1749–1809) married in 1775 Catherine Bell (1755–1794) and had 13 children (of whom several died young), but including:
        - Elizabeth Gurney (1780–1845) married in 1800 Joseph Fry (1777–1861).
        - Hannah Gurney (1783–1872) married in 1807 Sir Thomas Buxton, 1st Baronet (1786–1845).
        - Louisa Gurney (1784–1836) married in 1806 Samuel Hoare (1783–1847).
        - Samuel Gurney (1786–1856) married in 1808 Elizabeth Shepphard (died 1855) and had 9 children, including:
          - Catherine Gurney (1814–1911) married in 1836 Sir Edward Buxton, 2nd Baronet (1812–1858) and had 8 children.
          - Samuel Gurney (1816–1882) married Ellen Reynolds.
          - Rev. John Gurney (1809–1856) married in 1842 Laura Elizabeth Pearse (died 1899) and had 5 children, including:
            - Rev. Joseph John Gurney (1848-1890) married in 1879 Frances Julia Martineau (1853 - 1931), great-granddaughter of Peter Finch Martineau (1755 - 1847).
            - Catherine Gurney (1848–1934) married in 1869 Frederic Lubbock (1844–1927) and had 7 children, including:
              - Percy Lubbock (1879–1965).
            - John Gurney (1845–1887) married in 1871 Isabel Blake-Humfrey (1851–1932) and had five sons and two daughters, including:
              - Sir Eustace Gurney (1876–1927), father-in-law of Brigadier Arnold Cazenove (1898–1969), thus grandfather of actor Christopher Cazenove.
              - Sir Hugh Gurney (1878–1968), diplomat
              - Robert Gurney (1879–1950), zoologist, married in [missing year] Sarah Gamzu Garstang (1878–1972), sister of Walter Garstang, and had 1 child:
                - Oliver Gurney (1911–2001), Assyriologist.
        - Joseph John Gurney (1788–1847) married first in 1817 Jane Birkbeck (1789–1822); secondly in 1827 Mary Fowler (1802–1835); thirdly in 1841 Eliza Paul Kirkbride (1801–1881), and had 3 children, including:
          - John Henry Gurney Sr. (1819–1890) married in 1846 Mary Jary (1829–1872) and had 2 children, including:
            - John Henry Gurney Jr. (1848–1922), ornithologist, married in 1876 Margaret Jane Gurney (born 1852) and had issue, including:
              - Agatha Gurney (1881–1937) married in 1906 Sir Edward Ruggles-Brise, 1st Baronet (1882–1942).
        - Daniel Gurney (1791–1880) married in 1822 Lady Harriet Jemima Hay (1803–1837), daughter of William Hay, 17th Earl of Erroll, and had 9 children, including:
          - Charles Henry Gurney (1833–1899) married in 1861 Alice Prinsep, daughter of Sir Henry Thoby Prinsep, and had issue.
      - Rachel (1755–1794) married in 1775 Robert Barclay (1751–1830) and had issue, including:
        - Charles Barclay (1780–1855) married in 1804 Anna Maria Kett.

== Gurney residences ==
The principal seats of the Gurney family were Earlham Hall and Keswick Hall near Norwich, along with Heggatt Hall, North Runcton and Bawdeswell Hall near Dereham.

=== Earlham Hall ===
Earlham Hall, in Norwich, was rented from the Bacon family and served as the residence of John Gurney (1749–1809) and the childhood home of his daughter Elizabeth Fry. Earlham Hall is today occupied by UEA Law School.

=== Keswick Hall ===
Keswick Hall, in Keswick, Norfolk, was the residence of Richard Gurney (1742–1811), his son Hudson, and many other Gurneys. Keswick Hall housed a teacher training college until the early 2000s, when it was converted into private dwellings.

=== Northrepps ===
Northrepps Hall is a large manor house near Cromer, Norfolk, occupied by the same family for more than eight generations. The family now has a thousand members, many of whom have made their mark on society. Notable are Thomas Fowell Buxton, of slave emancipation fame, and Elizabeth Fry, the social reformer. For the Buxton, Barclay, and Gurney families, Northrepps has been a central focus for many years. Verily Anderson recalls life at the house, providing a close-up account of family life through the eyes of the many children who used the house over generations.
