= Joseph Fry (tea merchant) =

Tea merchant from England (1777 - 1861)

- Born: 21 April 1777; London, England, Great Britain
- Died: 28 August 1861 (aged 84); London, England, United Kingdom
- Spouse: Elizabeth Fry (m. 1800; died 1845)
- Children: 11

Joseph Fry (21 April 1777 – 28 August 1861) was a tea dealer and an unsuccessful banker. He was the husband of the prison reformer Elizabeth Fry.

== Parental family ==
Joseph Fry's father was William Storrs Fry (1736–1808) who moved from Wiltshire to London and established a company dealing in tea and banking services, later called W. S. Fry & Sons. William married Elizabeth Lambert in 1767, who was, like him, a "plain" Quaker.

Joseph was born in London 21 April 1777, the youngest of the three sons, and three daughters of William and Elizabeth Fry. One of his brothers died aged 27. He and his older brother, William Fry (1768–1858), joined the family business. However, their mother is credited with "the financial acumen which had enabled money both to be acquired and prudently managed: it was a quality which perhaps neither of the sons inherited".

William Storrs Fry's brother Joseph Fry (1728–1787) founded the chocolate factory that was later to become J. S. Fry & Sons and a type-founding works in Bristol, for which the Fry family is famous.

== Marriage ==
On 19 August 1800 at the Norwich Quaker Meeting House, Goat Lane, Norwich, Joseph married Elizabeth Gurney (1780–1845), daughter of John Gurney (1749—1809) and Catherine Gurney (born Bell, 1755—1792). The bride's family were proverbially wealthy bankers, originally based in Norwich.

== Children ==
He had five sons and six daughters (one of whom died in infancy):

- Katharine (Kitty) Fry born 22 August 1801, unmarried
- Rachel Elizabeth Fry born 25 March 1803 died 1888, married Francis Cresswell
- John Fry born 1804 died 1872, married Rachel Reynolds
- William Storrs Fry born 1 June 1806, died 1844, married Juliana Pelly
- Richenda Fry born 18 February 1808, died 1884 married Foster Reynolds
- Joseph Fry born 20 September 1809, died 1896, married Alice Partridge
- Elizabeth (Betsy) Fry born February 1811, died 1815
- Hannah Fry born 12 September 1812, died 10 March 1895, married William Champion Streatfeild of Chart's Edge, Westerham, Kent
- Louisa Fry born 1814, died 1896, married Raymond Pelly
- Samuel Fry born 1816 (known as "Gurney"), married Sophia Pinkerton
- Daniel Fry, known as "Henry" or "Harry", born October 1822 died 1892, married Lucy Sheppard

== Business difficulties ==
During the 1812 financial panic in the City of London, William Fry precipitated a crisis, by lending a large amount of the bank's money to his wife's family, undermining its solvency. It was Joseph's wife, with her Gurney financial grasp and her connections, who pulled things through; her brother John Gurney (1781–1814), brother-in-law Samuel Hoare III (1783–1847) and cousin Hudson Gurney (1775–1864) came to inspect the firm's accounts and left her in no doubt that they would do "what is needful for us" which, meant a large investment in the W.S. Fry & Sons bank.

During the financial Panic of 1825, Elizabeth Fry's relations once more saved the banking firm. When the same problems recurred in 1828, no further Gurney support was offered, and on 21 November, W.S. Fry closed. The Gurneys acted as receivers and saved the tea merchant business, placing it under their control with Joseph Fry on a salary of £600 per year.

Bankruptcy was not tolerated by the Religious Society of Friends. Joseph Fry was disowned by Ratcliff & Barking Monthly Meeting in May 1829: he was re-instated, with much admonition, in 1838.

== Changes of residence ==
When they were first married, they lived "over the shop" in St. Mildred Court, Poultry, City of London. After his father's death in 1808, they moved to the grander Plashet House, East Ham. In 1829, they needed to reduce their expenditure and moved to a smaller house in "The Cedars", Upton Lane. After the death of Joseph's sister, Elizabeth Fry (1779–1844), they moved to her home, Plashet Cottage, East Ham. He lived there until his death on 28 August 1861.

== Sources ==
- Edward H. Milligan Biographical dictionary of British Quakers in commerce and industry pp. 190–191: Biographical notes on Joseph Fry (1777–1861)
- Rose, June. Elizabeth Fry, a biography. London & Basingstoke: Macmillan, 1980. ISBN 0-333-31921-4, reprinted 1994 by Quaker Home Service ISBN 0-85245-260-8.
- Francisca de Haan, ‘Fry, Elizabeth (1780–1845)’, Oxford Dictionary of National Biography, Oxford University Press, Sept 2004; online edn, May 2007 accessed 12 Aug 2008
