= John Henry Gurney Jr. =

British ornithologist

- Born: 31 July 1848
- Died: 8 November 1922 (aged 74)
- Spouse: Margaret Jane Gurney (m. 1876)

John Henry Gurney Jr. (31 July 1848 – 8 November 1922) was a British ornithologist from the Gurney family.

== Family origins ==
Gurney was born in 1848 in Easton Lodge, Easton, Norfolk, son of John Henry Gurney Sr. and his second cousin Mary Jary Gurney. He was educated at Harrow School.

== Career ==
For a short time Gurney worked in Messrs. Backhouse's bank at Darlington, but he spent most of his life in Norfolk. In Norfolk he was known as a landowner and country gentleman. He took a prominent part in local religious and philanthropic work.

He was High Sheriff of Norfolk in 1894. At the time of his death he was a Justice of the Peace and a Deputy Lieutenant for Norfolk.

== Ornithologist ==
His father, John Henry Gurney Sr, although a politician was probably best known as an ornithologist, therefore John Henry junior was brought up from an early age to know and love birds.

Gurney gained an international reputation as an ornithologist. He was elected as a Fellow of the Zoological Society in 1868, a Member of the British Ornithologists' Union in 1870 and a fellow of the Linnean Society in 1885.

Gurney also took a keen interest in local ornithology. He was always a generous supporter of the local Wild Birds' Protection Societies. He was one of the original members of the Norfolk and Norwich Naturalists' Society which was founded in March 1869.

== Marriage and family ==
John Henry Gurney married Margaret Jane Gurney (1851-1940) on 25 October 1876 at St Marylebone church, Westminster, London. Margaret was also his second cousin, daughter of Henry Edmund Gurney (1821-1905) and Jane née Birkbeck (1828-1888). They had a son and three daughters:

- Gerald Hudson Gurney (1880-1934)
- Agatha Gurney (1881-1937)
- Cecily Jane Gurney (1884-1958)
- Margaret Editha Gurney (1886-1981)

== Works ==
Gurney's first written contribution to ornithology was a letter to The Ibis on swallows which was published in 1866. His most important publications include:

- Gurney, John Henry (1876). Rambles of a Naturalist in Egypt & Other Countries : with an analysis of the claims of certain foreign birds to be considered British, and other ornithological notes. London: Jarrold & Sons.
- Gurney, John Henry; Russell, C.; Coues, Elliott (1885). "The House Sparrow: by an Ornithologist" . The House Sparrow . London: William Wesley & Son – via Wikisource.
- Gurney, John Henry (1887). On the Misdeeds of the Sparrow. London: Gurney & Jackson.
- Gurney, John Henry (1887). "Ornithological Notes from North Norfolk". The Zoologist. series 3, v. 11: 140–142.
- Gurney, John Henry (1894). Catalogue of the Birds of Prey (Accipitres and Striges), with the Number of Specimens in Norwich Museum. London: R.H. Porter.
- Gurney, John Henry (1913). The Gannet: a Bird with a History. London: Witherby.
- Gurney, John Henry (1921). Early Annals of Ornithology. London: H.F. & G. Witherby.
