= Overend, Gurney and Company =

London bank, collapsed 1866

- Company type: Public
- Industry: Finance
- Founded: 1800
- Founder: Thomas Richardson; John Overend
- Defunct: 10 May 1866
- Fate: Bankruptcy
- Headquarters: 65 Lombard Street, London, UK
- Area served: United Kingdom
- Services: Financial services

Overend, Gurney and Company was a London wholesale discount bank, known as "the bankers' bank", which collapsed in 1866 owing about £11 million, equivalent to £1,132 million in 2025. The collapse of the institution triggered a banking panic.

== History ==
=== Early years ===
The business was founded in 1800 as Richardson, Overend and Company by Thomas Richardson, clerk to a London bill discounter, and John Overend, chief clerk in the bank of Smith, Payne and Company at Nottingham (absorbed into the National Provincial Bank in 1902), with Gurney's Bank (absorbed into Barclays Bank in 1896) supplying the capital.

At that time, bill-discounting was carried on sporadically by ordinary merchants in addition to their regular business, but Richardson considered that there was room for a London house which should devote itself entirely to the trade in bills. This idea, novel at the time, proved an instant success. Samuel Gurney joined the firm in 1807 and took control of Overend, Gurney and Co. in 1809. The Gurneys were a well known Quaker family that had founded Gurney's Bank in Norwich.

The bank's core business was the buying and selling of bills of exchange at a discount. It was well respected, and expanded rapidly, reaching a turnover double its competitors combined. For forty years it was the greatest discounting-house in the world. During the financial crisis of 1825, the firm was able to make short loans to many other bankers. The house indeed became known as "the bankers' banker", and secured many of the previous clients of the Bank of England. Samuel Gurney died in 1856.

=== Liquidation ===
After Samuel Gurney's retirement, the bank expanded its investment portfolio, and took on substantial investments in railways and other long-term investments rather than holding short-term cash reserves as was necessary for their role. It found itself with liabilities of around £4 million, and liquid assets of only £1 million. In an effort to recover its liquidity, the business was incorporated as a limited company in July 1865 and sold its £15 shares at a £9 premium, taking advantage of the buoyant market during the years of 1864–66. However, this period was followed by a rapid collapse in stock and bond prices, accompanied by a tightening of commercial credit. Railway stocks were particularly badly affected.

Overend Gurney's monetary difficulties increased, and it requested assistance from the Bank of England, but this was refused. The bank suspended payments on 10 May 1866. A run on the bank ensued as panic spread across London, Liverpool, Manchester, Norwich, Derby, and Bristol the following day, with large crowds around Overend Gurney's head offices at 65 Lombard Street. The failure of Overend Gurney was the most significant casualty of the credit crisis, although dozens of banks also failed due to the banking panic. The firm went into liquidation in June 1866. The financial crisis following the collapse saw the bank rate rise to 10 per cent for three months. More than 200 companies, including other banks, failed as a result.

The directors of the company were tried at the Old Bailey for fraud based on false statements in the prospectus for the 1865 offering of shares. However, the Lord Chief Justice Sir Alexander Cockburn said that they were guilty only of "grave error" rather than criminal behaviour, and the jury acquitted them. The advisor was found to be guilty. Although some of the Gurneys lost their fortunes in the bank's collapse, the Norwich cousins succeeded in insulating themselves from the bank's problems, and the Gurney bank escaped significant damage to its business and reputation.

== See also ==
- UK company law
- Gurney's bank
- Lombard Street: A Description of the Money Market, 1873 treatise on finance by Walter Bagehot
