= Earlham Hall =

Country house in Norfolk, England

Coordinates: 52.6255°N 1.2366°E

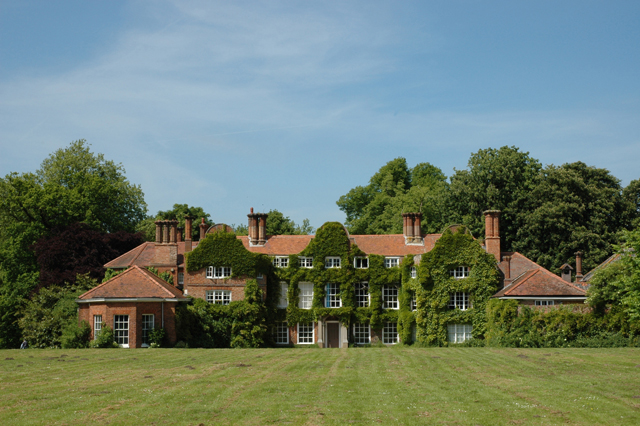
Earlham Hall at the University of East Anglia, the childhood home of the prison reformer Elizabeth Fry

Earlham Hall is a country house in Norfolk, England. It is located just to the west of the city of Norwich, on Earlham Road, on the outskirts of the village of Earlham. For generations it was the home of the Gurney family. The Gurneys were known as bankers and social activists; prison reformer Elizabeth Fry grew up at Earlham Hall. When the University of East Anglia was founded in 1963, the building became its administrative centre, and it now serves as the law school.

== History ==
Earlham Hall was built in 1642 by Robert Houghton. By the eighteenth century it was occupied by Nockold Tompson, a brewer who was Mayor of Norwich in 1759–60. When he farmed at Earlham Hall his crop-yield experiments were praised by Arthur Young in his Farmer's Calendar of 1771. Also in the eighteenth century it was in the ownership of the Bacon family; Edward Bacon M.P. built a "handsome, long, and lofty" dining room. He died in 1786 and ownership descended to a Mr Bacon Frank of Campsall, now in East Yorkshire. At this juncture the house was rented to the Gurney family, an arrangement which persisted for well over a century, "perhaps one of the oldest tenancies known for a mansion of the size, though very frequent In the case of farmhouses".

The Gurneys were influential and wealthy Quakers who established the bank bearing their name in 1770. (The family became sufficiently well known to be mentioned in Gilbert and Sullivan's 1875 comic opera Trial by Jury: a character describes his accumulation of wealth until "at length I became as rich as the Gurneys". Gurney's Bank merged into Barclays in 1896.)

Earlham Hall was the home of John Gurney (1749-1809) and his wife Catherine Bell (1755–1794). They had 13 children, including the bankers Samuel Gurney and Daniel Gurney, the social reformers Elizabeth Fry and Joseph John Gurney, and Louisa Hoare, the writer on education. Another sister, Hannah, married Sir Fowell Buxton, MP, brewer, and abolitionist.

The Gurneys welcomed visitors and friends at Earlham Hall including Anna Laetitia Barbauld, Amelia Opie - an intimate friend of the family - and Susannah Taylor, all three being Bluestockings.

George Borrow (1803-1881), author and traveller, used as a boy to fish the River Yare near Earlham Hall. On one occasion he was caught by Joseph John Gurney, who later invited the boy to his home to see his books. In his autobiographical novel Lavengro Borrow recalls Earlham Hall;

On the right side is a green level, a smiling meadow, grass of the richest decks the side of the slope; mighty trees also adorn it, giant elms, the nearest of which, when the sun is nigh its meridian, fling a broad shadow upon the face of the ancient brick of an old English Hall. It has a stately look, that old building, indistinctly seen, as it is, among the umbrageous trees.

Percy Lubbock (1879-1965), art critic and biographer, was associated with Earlham Hall. He was the son of the merchant banker Frederic Lubbock and his wife Catherine, daughter of John Gurney (1809–1856). Lubbock spent his childhood summer holidays at his mother's family home; his memoir Earlham (1922) won the James Tait Black Memorial Prize.

The Hall was used as council and nurses accommodation before the war, and provided maternity beds when bombs smashed Norwich's maternity home in June 1942. It also housed a school while the council built new accommodation in West Earlham.

In October 1963, Earlham Hall and its gardens became the home of the newly opened University of East Anglia. The Vice-Chancellor and administration were based in Earlham Hall. It later housed the Norwich Law School. Following major refurbishment and restoration (at a cost of around £8 million), the Law School returned to Earlham Hall in March 2014 after four years being located in the Blackdale building.

In May 2015, the grounds of Earlham Hall were used as a backstage area for artists performing at Radio 1's Big Weekend at Earlham Park. The University of East Anglia communications team used part of the Hall, and Taylor Swift, among others, used another part as a dressing room before performing.
