= Samuel Gurney (1786–1856) =

English banker and philanthropist (1786–1856)

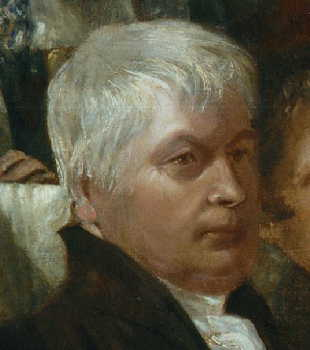
- Samuel Gurney in 1840, by Benjamin Robert Haydon
- Born: 18 October 1786; Earlham Hall, near Norwich, England
- Died: 5 June 1856 (aged 69); Paris, France
- Resting place: Barking, London
- Occupations: Banker & philanthropist
- Spouse: Elizabeth Sheppard (m. 1808)
- Parents: John Gurney (father); Catherine Bell (mother)
- Relatives: Samuel Gurney (son); Joseph John Gurney (brother); Daniel Gurney (brother); Elizabeth Gurney (sister); Louisa Gurney (sister); Samuel Hoare (brother-in-law); Joseph Fry (brother-in-law)

Samuel Gurney (18 October 1786 – 5 June 1856) was an English banker and philanthropist from the Gurney family of Norwich. He should not be confused with his second son, Samuel (1816–1882), also described as banker and philanthropist, and a Member of Parliament.

== Early years and marriage ==
Gurney was born at Earlham Hall near Norwich, England, 18 October 1786, the second son of John Gurney (1749–1809), a Quaker banker of Norwich, and Catherine, the daughter of Daniel Bell (1728–1750), a London merchant from Stamford Hill. The family's Gurney's Bank was founded in 1770.

Gurney was educated at Wandsworth, Surrey, and at Hingham, Norfolk. Among his siblings were Joseph John Gurney, Daniel Gurney (1791–1880), Elizabeth Fry, Louisa Hoare (1784–1836), the wife of Samuel Hoare, and Hannah Buxton, the wife of Sir Thomas Buxton. At the age of 14, Gurney was placed in the counting-house of his brother-in-law, Joseph Fry (1777–1861), a tea merchant and banker, at St Mildred's Court, Poultry, in the City of London.

== Overend, Gurney and Company ==
The wealth that came to Gurney from his father-in-law and what was bequeathed to him by his father, helped him to make rapid progress as a partner in Richardson and Overend, with which he had become connected in 1807. The business had been founded in 1800 by Thomas Richardson, a clerk to a London bill discounter, and John Overend, Chief Clerk in the bank of Smith, Payne & Company in Nottingham, with the Gurneys supplying the capital. At that time bill discounting was carried on sporadically by ordinary merchants in addition to their regular business, but Richardson thought there was room for a London house that would concern itself entirely with trading in bills. This novel idea proved an instant success. On his father's death in 1809, Samuel Gurney assumed the control of the Norwich bank. At the same time he took control of Richardson and Overend, whose name was later changed to Overend, Gurney and Company.

Soon after Gurney entered the firm, it began to assume proportions that made it, for about forty years, the largest discounting house in the world. At first only discounting bills, it soon began to lend money on all sorts of securities. In the panic of 1825, the firm was able to lend money to many houses to tide them over their difficulties; this brought them into even greater favour. Gurney became known as "the bankers' banker", and many firms which had previously dealt with the Bank of England now began depositing their surplus cash in its hands. At the time of Gurney's death in 1856, it was calculated that the house held deposits amounting to £8 million sterling. Nonetheless, the bank collapsed in 1866, owing millions.

== Philanthropic interests ==
During the later years of his life, charitable and philanthropic undertakings almost monopolized Gurney's attention.

Penal reform and criminal justice

Gurney took a part in the efforts of Joseph John Gurney, Fowell Buxton, and Elizabeth Fry for the improvement of prison discipline and the reform of the criminal code. He refused to prosecute a man who had forged his name, knowing well that death was the punishment for such an offence.

Anti-slavery

Gurney is to the front and left of this painting of the 1840 Anti-Slavery Convention. Move your cursor to identify him or click the icon to enlarge

Gurney attended the 1840 World Anti-Slavery Convention in London and he was a prime figure in the painting which is now in the National Portrait Gallery in London. He is in the foreground of the painting on the left.

The second international Anti-Slavery convention was in 1843 when Gurney was the chairman of the convention. Richard Peek took the chair of the convention when Gurney had to leave.

Africa

He also interested himself in the Niger Expedition of 1841. In March 1841 he entertained Captain Henry Dundas Trotter, Commander William Allen, and a large number of the officers of the expedition at a farewell dinner at Upton.

Gurney was a liberal patron of the infant colony of Liberia, kept up a correspondence with President Roberts, and for his many gifts was rewarded by his name being given to a town of Gallenas in 1851.

Education and the Great Hunger

He became treasurer of the British and Foreign School Society in 1843, and held that post till his decease.

In 1849, Gurney undertook a tour of Ireland, where he made considerable gifts to poor people still suffering from the effects of the famine.

Peace mission to France

In 1853 he accompanied a deputation sent to Napoleon III to express a desire for a long continuance of peace and amity between England and France.

Poplar hospital

On the initiative of Gurney, the Poplar Hospital for Accidents, the first casualty hospital for dockworkers, was opened in 1855.

St Paul's Church, Stratford

In 1853 he assisted in the construction of a mission building, which later became the parish church of St Paul's Church, Stratford.

== Death and burial ==
Samuel Gurney's wife died at Ham House, Essex, on 14 February 1855, and in the autumn of that year, his own health being much broken, he moved his residence to Nice. Getting worse in the spring of 1856, he hurried homewards, desiring to end his days in his own country among his kindred. He reached Paris, but could go no further and died in an hotel in that city on 5 June 1856, at the age of 69.

He was buried in the Friends' cemetery at Barking on 19 June, when an immense concourse of people attended the funeral. He left nine children and upwards of forty grandchildren, but his eldest son, John Gurney (1809–1856) of Earlham Hall, did not long survive him, dying on 23 September 1856. Gurney was the author of a pamphlet To the Electors of South Essex 1852, in which he recommended the election of his son-in-law Sir Edward North Buxton.

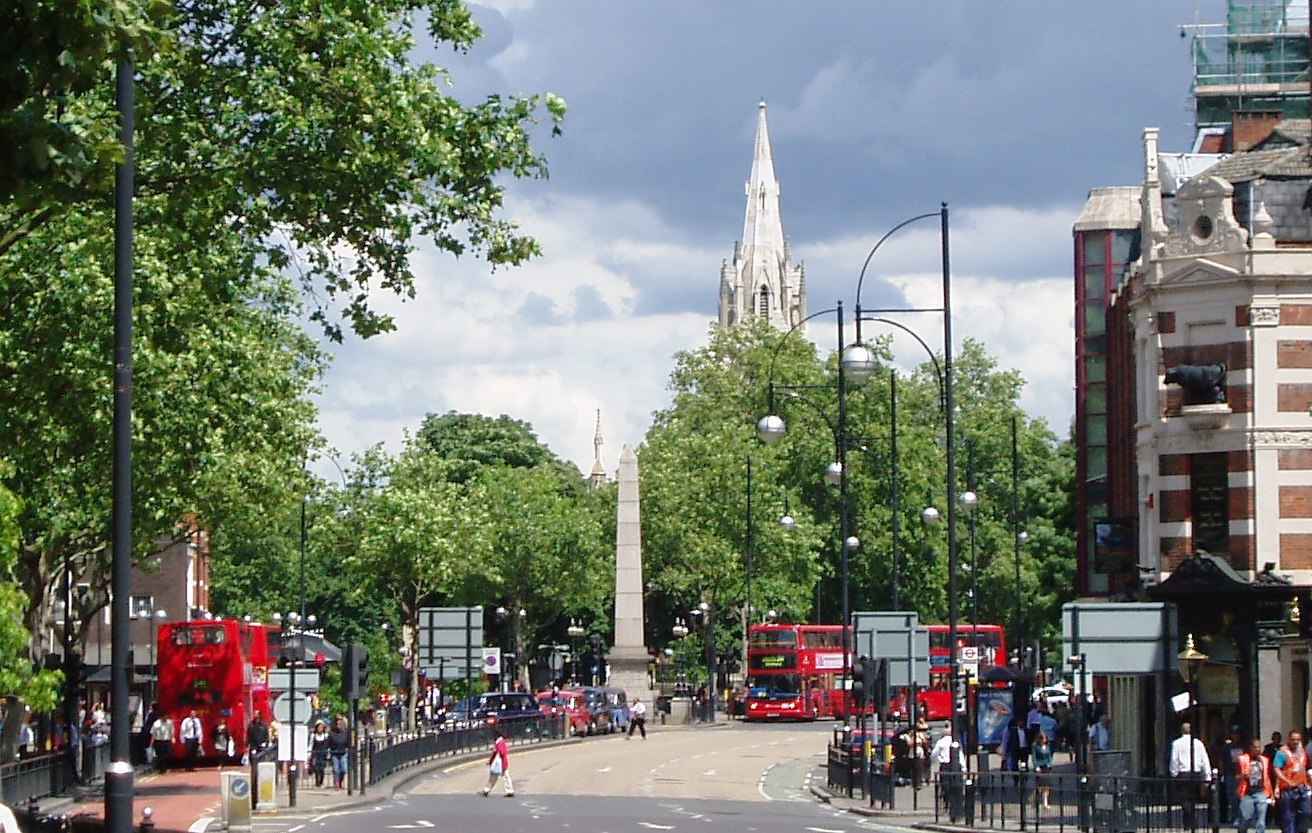
The 12.8 metre tall Gurney Memorial obelisk in Stratford Broadway

== Legacy ==
In 1861, a memorial drinking fountain, in the form of a tall granite obelisk, was unveiled in Gurney's memory. Designed by John Bell, it stands in the middle of the Broadway in Stratford. It bears the inscription (a paraphrase from the Book of Job, Chapter 29 verse 11) IN REMEMBRANCE OF SAMUEL GURNEY / WHO DIED THE 5TH OF JUNE 1856 / ERECTED BY HIS FELLOW PARISHIONERS AND FRIENDS / 1861 / "When the ear heard him then it blessed him"

== Failure of Overend, Gurney and Co. ==
The great commercial establishment of Overend, Gurney & Co., which Gurney had brought to a position of unexampled wealth and influence, after passing into less competent hands, was reorganised as a joint-stock company in August 1865, but failed on 10 May 1866, when its liabilities amounted to £11 million, ruining some of the Gurneys as well as numerous other investors. However, Gurney's Bank and most of the Gurney family escaped losses.

== Family ==
On 7 April 1808, Gurney married Elizabeth, daughter of James Sheppard of Ham House, Upton, Essex, a handsome residence that descended in 1812 to the young couple, and was their abode for nearly the whole of their married life. They had three sons and six daughters. The children's names – John, Samuel, Henry Edmund, Sarah, Catherine, Elizabeth, Priscilla, Rachel and Richenda – appear in the Gurney Family Tree at p. 28 of U.S.:. Barclay Fox married a grand-daughter of Samuel Gurney's brother, Joseph.

Samuel Gurney MP was the second of the three sons of the marriage. The second daughter Catherine married Sir Edward Buxton, 2nd Baronet. Their daughter Elizabeth married Ernest Christian Ludwig de Bunsen. Priscilla married William Henry Leatham.

== Notes ==
Attribution

- Chisholm, Hugh, ed. (1911). "Gurney" . Encyclopædia Britannica (11th ed.). Cambridge University Press.
- Boase, George Clement (1911). "Gurney, Samuel" . Dictionary of National Biography. London: Smith, Elder & Co. pp. 366–367.
