= John Gurney (1749–1809) =

English banker (1749–1809)

John Gurney (10 November 1749 – 28 October 1809) was an English banker and member of the Gurney family of Norwich. Besides his role as a partner in Gurney's bank he is notable as the father of the social reformers Elizabeth Fry and Joseph John Gurney, the writer Louisa Hoare and the banker Samuel Gurney.

== Biography ==
John Gurney was born in 1749 into an influential Quaker family that established Gurney's bank in 1770. At the turn of the 19th century, the family business was led by Bartlett Gurney (1756–1802). When he died childless in 1802, members from another branch of the family succeeded him and John and his brother Richard (1742–1811) became partners in the bank in 1803.

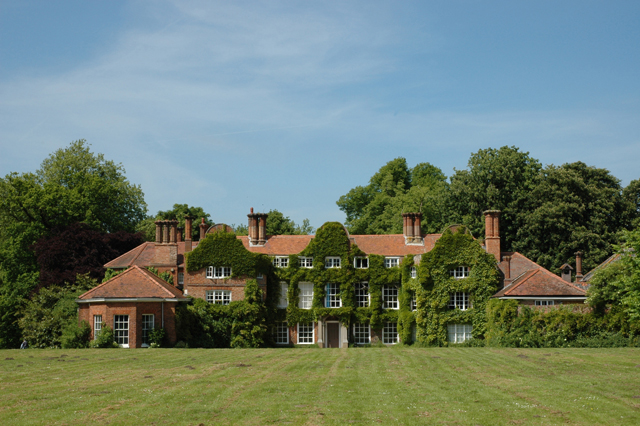
Earlham Hall, residence of John Gurney and childhood home of his daughter Elizabeth Fry

John Gurney lived at Earlham Hall in Norwich. On 26 May 1775 at Tottenham, London, he married Catherine Bell (1755–1794), daughter of Daniel Bell and Catherine Barclay, a member of the Barclay family, who were among the founders of Barclays Bank. Catherine's sister was Priscilla Wakefield, a writer on feminist economics and children's literature. John Gurney and his wife had 13 children, including the bankers Samuel Gurney and Daniel Gurney, the social reformers Elizabeth Fry and Joseph John Gurney, while Hannah married Sir Thomas Buxton. Another daughter was Louisa Hoare, the writer on education. When John Gurney's wife died in 1794, Elizabeth as became partly responsible for the care and training of her younger siblings.

In the 19th century, the Gurney family was known for its wealth: In Gilbert and Sullivan's 1875 comic opera "Trial by Jury", a character describes his accumulation of wealth until at length I became as rich as the Gurneys.

On John Gurney's death in 1809, his son Samuel Gurney assumed the control of Gurney's Bank in Norwich. About the same time, he also took over control of the London billbroking business of Richardson, Overend & Company, whose title was subsequently changed to Overend, Gurney and Company. It went on to become the world's largest discounting house.

== Descendants ==
John Gurney and his wife Catherine Bell had 13 children, of whom several died young. The surviving children include

1. Elizabeth Gurney (1780–1845) ∞ 1800 Joseph Fry (1777–1861), and had issue
2. Hannah Gurney (1783–1872) ∞ Sir Thomas Buxton, 1st Baronet (1786–1845), and had issue
3. Louisa Gurney (1784–1836) ∞ 1806 Samuel Hoare (1783–1847), and had issue
4. Samuel Gurney (1786–1856) ∞ 1808 Elizabeth Shepphard († 1855) and had issue
5. Joseph John Gurney (1788–1847) ∞ (I) 1817 Jane Birkbeck (1789–1822) and ∞ (II) 1827 Mary Fowler (1802–1835) and ∞ (III) 1841 Eliza Paul Kirkbride (1801–1881) and had issue
6. Daniel Gurney (1791–1880) ∞ 1822 Lady Harriet Jemima Hay (1803–1837), daughter of William Hay, 17th Earl of Erroll, and had issue
