= Gurney's Bank =

Bank formerly based in Norwich, England

Gurney's bank was a family-run bank founded by members of the Gurney family in 1770 and headquartered in Norwich, England. It merged into Barclays Bank in 1896.

== History ==
The bank was founded in 1770 by John and Henry Gurney, sons of John Gurney (1688–1741), who passed the business to Henry's son, Bartlett Gurney, in 1777. The bank was founded in what is now known as Bank Plain (formerly Redwell Street). The Quaker Gurneys were renowned for their honesty, reliability, and fair dealings — so people entrusted them their money for safe keeping. About 1777, Alderman Poole, a wine merchant, sold Bartlett Gurney premises near to the red well, and Gurney installed safes for bullion. A junior clerk slept on the trapdoor to the vaults to safeguard the valuables. The bank issued its own notes. A bull mastiff (complete with brass collar) stood on guard inside the doors at the Bank Plain premises, and there was always a blunderbuss at the ready.

Bartlett Gurney died in 1802, without a male heir, in Norwich. He was succeeded in control of the bank by his cousins, including John Gurney, whose children included the banker Samuel Gurney. On his father's death in 1809, Samuel Gurney assumed the control of the Norwich bank. About the same time, he also took over the control of the London billbroking business of Richardson, Overend & Company, in which he was already a partner. The title of the firm was subsequently changed to Overend, Gurney and Company, and for forty years it was the greatest discounting house in the world. Samuel Gurney died in 1856.

In 1865, the business of Overend, Gurney & Company, which had come under less competent control, went public as a joint stock company, but in 1866 the firm suspended payment with liabilities amounting to £11,000,000 Sterling. The failure of that bank ruined a number of the Gurneys, as well as numerous investors. The Norwich bank, however, escaped significant damage to its business and reputation from the collapse of the cousins' business. The Times stated, shortly after the suspension: "It is understood that the suspension of Overend, Gurney & Co will not in the slightest degree compromise Gurney's Bank of Norwich. That establishment recently passed into the hands of new partners, whose resources are beyond all question".

The Gurney family was known for its wealth; in Gilbert and Sullivan's 1875 comic opera Trial by Jury, a character describes his accumulation of wealth until he "became as rich as the Gurneys".

In 1896, Gurney's Bank merged with Backhouse's Bank of Darlington and Barclays Bank of London and several other provincial banks, controlled by Quaker families, to form what is now Barclays Bank.

== See also ==
- Gurney family (Norwich)
