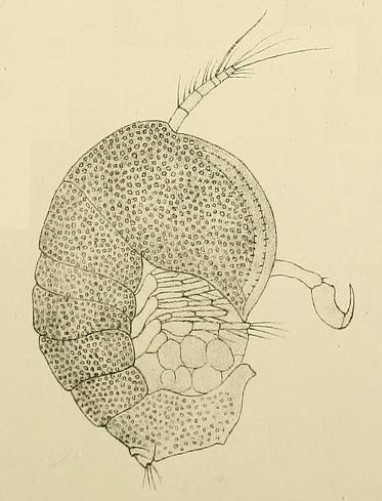

Scientific classification
- Kingdom: Animalia
- Phylum: Arthropoda
- Clade: Pancrustacea
- Class: Copepoda
- Order: Harpacticoida
- Family: Tegastidae
- Genus: Syngastes
- Species: S. twynami

Binomial name
- Syngastes twynami (Thompson I.C. & Scott A., 1903)

Synonyms
- Tegastes twynami (Thompson I.C. & Scott A., 1903)

= Syngastes twynami =

Species of harpacticoid copepod

Syngastes twynami is a species of harpacticoid copepod in the family Tegastidae. It is a minute crustacean first described in 1903 from the coastal waters off Ceylon (present-day Sri Lanka). The species was discovered by William A. Herdman, and named Tegastes twynami by Isaac C. Thompson and Andrew Scott in honour of Sir William Crofton Twynam, long-time Superintendent of the Ceylon Pearl Fisheries. It was later assigned to the genus Syngastes by A. Monard in 1924.

== Taxonomy and classification ==
Syngastes twynami belongs to the kingdom Animalia and phylum Arthropoda. Within Arthropods it is classified as a crustacean (subphylum Crustacea) in the class Copepoda. It falls under the order Harpacticoida (suborder Podoplea) and is a member of the family Tegastidae.

Originally, Thompson & Scott (1903) placed this species in the genus Tegastes (as Tegastes twynami), but the genus Syngastes was established in 1924 by A. Monard to encompass T. twynami and several related species. Modern taxonomic databases reflect this change. For example, the World Register of Marine Species (WoRMS) lists Syngastes twynami as the accepted name, while some other databases (e.g., the Global Biodiversity Information Facility (GBIF)) still cite Tegastes twynami as a synonym or alternate representation. There are no subspecies or varieties of S. twynami recognized, and it remains a distinct species within the Tegastidae.

== Description and diagnostic features ==
Syngastes twynami is an extremely small marine copepod, with adult females about 0.5 mm in length. Like other members of Tegastidae, it has a compact, laterally compressed body adapted to clinging to substrates in shallow waters. Thompson & Scott's original description noted that S. twynami closely resembles its congeners (such as S. imthurni and S. donnani) but can be distinguished by specific morphological features. The antennule of the female is only 6-segmented, which is fewer segments than in some related species. The second maxilliped (a feeding appendage) has a strongly pectinate (comb-like) inner edge bearing a round, funnel-shaped protuberance with a ciliated rim, and its terminal claw is unusually stout. The fifth pair of legs (often reduced in copepods) in S. twynami are similar in form to those of S. donnani but are proportionally larger.

The body surface (cuticle) of S. twynami is covered in minute circular dot markings, a feature noted on the basal segments of the fourth legs, the fifth legs, and on the claw (chela) of the posterior maxillipeds. Overall, the combination of a 6-jointed antennule, the uniquely ornamented maxilliped, and the dotted cuticle pattern are diagnostic for this species. Like other tegastids, it has a laterally flattened body shape with ventrally extending rims on the anterior segments, an adaptation for living in interstices of benthic habitats. The male of S. twynami was not described in the original work and remains poorly known (many early collections yielded only females).

== Habitat, distribution, and ecology ==
Syngastes twynami is associated with shallow marine environments and was initially found in the context of pearl oyster beds. The type specimens were recovered from “washings” of Muttuvaratu pearl oysters in the Gulf of Mannar, off the coast of what is now Sri Lanka. This suggests that S. twynami inhabits the benthic zone of tropical coastal waters, possibly living among coarse sediments, shells, or reef debris where pearl oysters (family Pteriidae) were collected. Tegastid copepods generally occupy phytal habitats (algal mats, seagrasses, coral rubble) and some are commensal on invertebrates. It is likely that S. twynami was living on or around the oyster shells or associated algae and was dislodged during the pearl oyster harvesting and washing process, rather than being a parasite of the oysters (there is no evidence of parasitism in this species; it appears to be free-living).

Beyond its type locality in Sri Lanka, Syngastes twynami has a patchy recorded distribution. Notably, it was reported from Chilika Lake on the east coast of India by R. B. Seymour Sewell in 1924. Chilika Lake is a large brackish lagoon, indicating this copepod can tolerate lower salinities or estuarine conditions. Sewell's finding extended the known range into the Bay of Bengal region. However, records of S. twynami remain scarce, and it is not a commonly collected species. There are no widespread reports outside the northern Indian Ocean, and its presence in Chilika and the Gulf of Mannar suggests a tropical Indo-Pacific distribution, possibly centered around the Indian subcontinent's coastal waters.

In terms of ecology, like other harpacticoid copepods, S. twynami is part of the meiobenthos, the community of microscopic animals living on or near the seabed. It likely feeds on detritus, microalgae, or biofilm on submerged surfaces. Tegastids are known to be associated with coral reefs and seaweed beds, sometimes forming commensal relationships with corals, polychaete worms, or bryozoans. While S. twynami has not been specifically reported as a commensal, its occurrence among oyster clumps suggests it might take advantage of structured habitats (shell surfaces, encrusting algae, etc.) for shelter and feeding. No specific predators or life history details are documented for this species, but generally such tiny copepods can be food for filter-feeding invertebrates and small fish larvae.

== Historical context and etymology ==
The species S. twynami holds historical significance due to its connection with the colonial-era exploration of Ceylon's marine fauna. It was discovered during Professor William A. Herdman's 1902 survey of the Ceylon pearl banks, an extensive scientific investigation into the pearl-oyster fisheries of the Gulf of Mannar. The copepod collections were published as “Supplementary Report VII. On the Copepoda” in the Report to the Government of Ceylon on the Pearl Oyster Fisheries of the Gulf of Manaar (1903). In this work, zoologists I. C. Thompson and A. Scott described dozens of new copepod species, Tegastes twynami among them. Thus, the original description of Syngastes twynami (as Tegastes twynami) appeared in 1903 with Thompson and Scott as authorities, in a Royal Society of London publication on Ceylon's marine biology. The type specimens (two females) were obtained from the pearl-oyster washings at the Muttuvaratu reef, and illustrations were provided in the report (Plate IV, figs. 13–16).

The etymology of the name twynami is explicitly explained by the original authors. Tegastes twynami was named in honour of Sir William Crofton Twynam, KCMG (1827–1922). Twynam was a British colonial administrator in Ceylon who served as the Government Agent of the Northern Province and was long involved in overseeing the pearl fisheries. He was Superintendent of the Ceylon Pearl Fisheries for many years (1862–1896) and wrote reports on the industry. By naming the copepod after Twynam, Thompson and Scott acknowledged his contributions to the pearl banks research and administration. This naming is an example of a patronym honouring a person influential in the context of the species’ discovery.
