= Delavalia polluta =

Scientific classification
- Domain: Eukaryota
- Kingdom: Animalia
- Phylum: Arthropoda
- Class: Copepoda
- Order: Harpacticoida
- Family: Miraciidae
- Genus: Delavalia
- Species: D. polluta

Binomial name
- Delavalia polluta (Monard, 1928)

Synonyms
- Stenhelia polluta Monard, 1928

Species of crustacean

Delavalia polluta is a species of copepod in the family Miraciidae, first described in 1928 by Albert Monard.
