= William Crofton Twynam =

British colonial administrator and biological scientist

Sir William Crofton Twynam CMG, KCMG
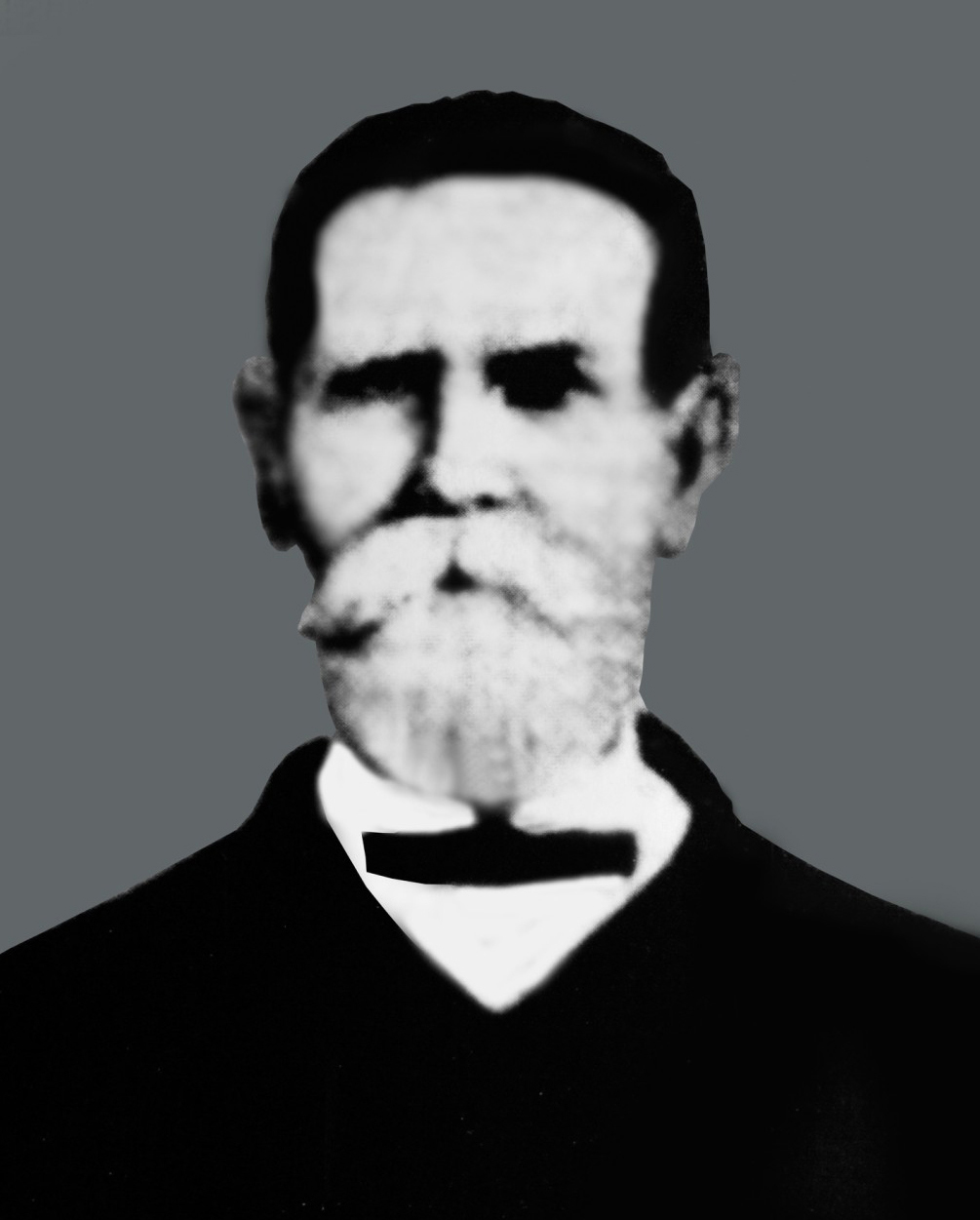

Government Agent of the Northern Province of Ceylon
- In office 1869 – 1896
- Preceded by: Percival A. Dyke
- Succeeded by: Robert Ievers

Personal details
- Born: 22 March 1827 Galle, Ceylon
- Died: 12 March 1922 (aged 94) Jaffna, Ceylon
- Spouse: Elizabeth Moir (m. 1852; died 1897)
- Children: 8
- Parents: Captain Thomas Holloway Twynam (father); Mary Cecilia Twynam (mother)

Sir William Crofton Twynam CMG, KCMG (22 March 1827 – 12 March 1922) was a British colonial administrator in Ceylon (now Sri Lanka). He served in the Ceylon Civil Service for over fifty years, including as the Government Agent of the Northern Province for twenty-seven years, and as the Superintendent of Pearl Fisheries in the Gulf of Mannar.

Twynam was respectfully nicknamed the "Rajah of the North" for his influence in and around Jaffna, and he played a significant role in managing and documenting Ceylon's pearl oyster fishery. He was appointed a Companion of the Order of St. Michael and St. George (CMG) in 1884 and later knighted as a Knight Commander of St. Michael and St. George (KCMG) in 1896.

== Early life and voyage on the Hindostan ==
Twynam was born in Galle, southern Ceylon, on 22 March 1827. He was the son of Captain Thomas Holloway Twynam, a Royal Navy officer who served as the Master Attendant of Galle Harbour, and Mary Cecilia Twynam (née Summerfield). Twynam had ten siblings and two half-siblings, including half-brother General Sir John Summerfield Hawkins, KCMG (from their mother's first marriage to Lieutenant John Hawkins, R.N.; she was tragically widowed when he lost his life in the West Indies trying to save a man who had fallen overboard).

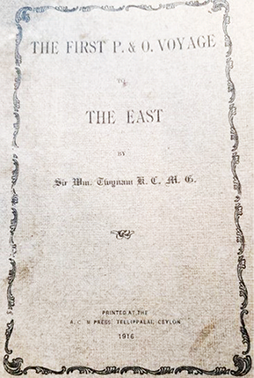
Cover of The First P. & O. Voyage to the East by Sir William Crofton Twynam, KCMG

At some point before he was fifteen years old, Twynam traveled to England, and his return to Ceylon in 1842 is well documented. At age fifteen, he sailed from Southampton aboard the P&O steamship Hindostan on its historic maiden voyage to the East. The ship had provision for one hundred and two first class passengers and fifty servants, and departed September 24, 1842 towards India. Her departure was a matter of national importance, this was the first time the P&O extended service beyond Suez to Calcutta. They received a ceremonial send‑off, other ships in the port and roadstead were dressed overall, and warships manned the yards as she passed.

There were not yet any established coal depots on the ocean voyage from England to India, so colliers had to be sent in advance. This created multi-day layovers in five pre-arranged ports of call: Gibraltar, Cape Verde Islands, Cape Town, Port Louis, and Galle (and another unexpectedly in St. Helena Bay when they ran out of coal) while the ship was restocked. In his later life, at the request of his fellow passenger Miss Barbara Layard, Twynam wrote a memoir, The First P. & O. Voyage to the East (published in 1916) recounting the journey.

The passengers included several notable individuals in Ceylon's history, including Sir Charles Peter Layard, KCMG (1806–1893) who would be the first Mayor of Colombo (and who was the grandson of the Very Rev. Charles Peter Layard (1750–1803), Dean of Bristol, and the father of Sir Charles Layard, a chief justice of the Ceylon Supreme Court), and other members of the Layard family. Their voyage home lasted about eighty days and was eventful, with at least one drowning death and one leg amputation. Twynam disembarked at Galle in mid-December 1842 before the Hindostan sailed on to Calcutta.

== Government Agent in Ceylon ==
In 1845, William Crofton Twynam entered the Ceylon Civil Service as a "writer" (a clerical trainee). He quickly rose through the ranks of the colonial administration, and by 1848 he was appointed an Assistant Government Agent in Jaffna, Northern Province. He later served as Assistant Government Agent in other districts, including Hambantota in 1854 and Mannar in 1856. In 1868, Twynam briefly served as the Government Agent of the North-Western Province.

On 1 September 1869, Twynam was appointed Government Agent of the Northern Province (based in Jaffna), succeeding his longtime chief, Percival Dyke. He would hold this post for twenty-seven years until his retirement in 1896. Twynam resided at Old Park, the spacious 19th-century residence that had originally been the home of Dyke, who arranged for it to be used rent-free by succeeding Government Agents. During his tenure, Twynam was known for his effective administration and close ties with the local community, which earned him the affectionate nickname "Rajah of the North" among the Tamil people of Jaffna.

Dyke and Twynam's administrations together provided an unusually stable continuity of governance in northern Ceylon – between them, they served as Government Agents in Jaffna for sixty-six years (1829–1896). This long period saw vast improvements in infrastructure and public services throughout the peninsula. In January 1896, Twynam was recognized for his service by the award of a knighthood (KCMG), and he formally retired from the Ceylon Civil Service in April 1896, succeeded by Robert Ievers. Twynam was highly respected and beloved in the region; even after retiring from office, he chose to remain living in Jaffna for twenty-six more years until his death, and was often involved in local public affairs.

== Superintendent of the Pearl Fisheries ==
In addition to his duties as a provincial administrator, Twynam served as the Superintendent of the Pearl Fisheries in Ceylon from 1862 until 1896. In this role he oversaw the management of the seasonal pearl oyster harvests on the pearl banks of the Gulf of Mannar, centered around Arippu and Marichchukkaddi. Twynam was regarded as an authority on all matters concerning the pearl fishery. He kept detailed records of oyster beds (paars) and the results of each year's fishery, and implemented a more scientific, systematic approach to pearl diving operations.

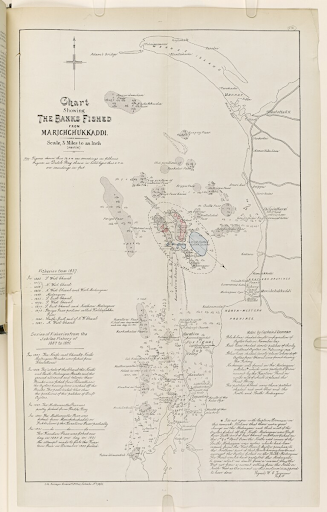
Chart of The Banks Fished From Marichchukkaddi from Report on the Ceylon Pearl Fisheries, 1899

After retiring, Sir William compiled his extensive knowledge into a comprehensive Report on the Ceylon Pearl Fisheries, 1899, which was published by the government in 1902. The report was the most exhaustive compilation of pearl fishery statistics up to that time, and documented the history and outcomes of the pearl fisheries, including data on divers, boats, revenues, and marine observations over several decades. It also included a large fold-out Chart of the Pearl Banks (drawn by Twynam in 1892 and printed by the Surveyor General's Office) mapping the locations of all known pearl oyster reefs in the Gulf of Mannar. Twynam's meticulous report and map provided a baseline for later marine scientists studying the decline of Ceylon's pearl oysters in the early 20th century.

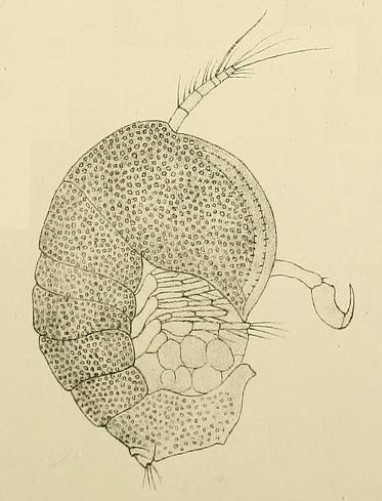
Sketch of Syngastes twynami

Twynam had a keen interest in the natural history of Ceylon's fauna, particularly its marine life. He authored a paper on "The Ceylon Turtle" in 1889 for the Ceylon Literary Register, describing the sea turtle species of the island. In 1864, while inspecting the pearl banks, he conducted an early experiment on sea snake venom. Twynam brought two sea snakes aboard a boat and observed that a chicken pecked by one of the snakes died within minutes, dramatically proving that the snakes were venomous. In recognition of his contributions, a minute crustacean discovered living with Ceylon pearl oysters was named Syngastes twynami after him in 1903.

== Honours ==
Knight Commander of the Order of St Michael and St George (KCMG)	1896
Commander of the Order of St Michael and St George (CMG)	1884

Twynam was honoured by the British Crown for his service to the colony. He was appointed a Companion of the Order of St. Michael and St. George (CMG) in the 1884 Birthday Honours, in recognition of his work as Government Agent of the Northern Province. In the 1896 New Year Honours, upon his retirement, he was promoted to Knight Commander of St. Michael and St. George (KCMG), receiving the title "Sir". These distinctions reflected his long and distinguished career in the Ceylon Civil Service.

== Personal life ==
On August 25th, 1852, Twynam married Elizabeth Moir in St. John's Church in Jaffna, and together they had eight children. After retiring from the civil service in 1896, he was widowed the following year by the passing of Elizabeth (then Lady Twynam), when she was about sixty-six years old. With a dedicated love for Jaffna and its people, Sir William chose to remain living where he had served, and he bought a house at Alfred Villa on Beach Road where he lived for twenty-six more years.

He stayed active in the community; as an elder statesman, he was an informal mentor and arbiter of local practice for junior colonial officers. A particular incident illustrating Twynam's paternalist influence was related by famous British author Leonard Woolf, future husband to Virginia Woolf, in his Ceylon memoir Growing. Woolf recounted the scandal he himself had caused as a junior cadet in Jaffna on the occasion of losing his virginity, and Sir William's intervention and efforts to try to maintain the dignity of everyone involved.

The Jaffna YMCA, across Kandy Road from the Old Park, was founded by Twynam in 1890, and he served as its first president. Upon his death on 12 March 1922 at the age of 94, he was laid to rest on its grounds.

== Legacy ==
Sir William Twynam left a lasting legacy in northern Sri Lanka. In 1918, St. John's College, Jaffna, then and still one of Sri Lanka's top schools with many notable alumni, established the Twynam Museum to house a large collection of local artifacts, natural specimens, and handicrafts that he had donated. Twynam had been a close friend of Jacob Thompson, the college's long-time principal, and took great interest in educational and cultural activities. The museum was mandated to be open to the public under a board of trustees, and was seen as a valuable addition to the community, preserving the heritage of Jaffna and the surrounding area. It was set amongst a grove of mahogany trees between St. John's College Hall and the Main Road, and consisted of an octagonal entrance hall and two wings. The foundation stone for the museum building was laid by Twynam's daughter, Nora Twynam, on his 91st birthday, 22 March 1918.

Contemporary accounts from several people described Twynam as a reasonable, even‑handed administrator, noting his dealings with officials and residents across communities regardless of culture, status, economic standing, and gender. As was reported by John H. Martyn in his more than four hundred pages of notes about the history of Jaffna:

"It would be difficult to enumerate the many and various directions in which [Twynam's] beneficient activities have been exercised during his administration. They are many and well-known to the people. It is sufficient to say that to his ability as an administrator he joined a rare sympathy with the needs and aspirations of the people. His sympathy was felt not only by the educated classes but by the poorest and most ignorant section of the people. He knew the whole of Jaffna in a way in which very few Jaffnese themselves know it."

Twynam's last day in office as Government Agent of the Northern Province was 15 January 1896 (he had been granted three months' leave in connection with his appointment as KCMG in the 1896 New Year Honours, and he formally retired in April 1896). It is notable that on the second-last day of Sir William's twenty‑seven year administration, 14 January 1896, the Church Missionary Society opened Chundikuli Girls' College near Old Park in Jaffna. Established as a sister school to St John's College, the aim of the school was and continues to be to provide girls with an English‑medium education comparable to that available to boys.

At the establishment of the Jaffna Young Men's Christian Association (YMCA) in 1890, Twynam served as the founder and first president, holding office from 1890-1904, and again in 1911; the association remains active.

His name is also remembered in scientific nomenclature by the crustacean Syngastes twynami, and his detailed documentation of the pearl banks remains a reference point for researchers.

Sir William Crofton Twynam's long residence and benevolent presence in Jaffna cemented his memory among locals. Although a native of Ceylon, his life and career exemplified the colonial administrator who identified closely with his home, and related well with the people he served.

== Selected works ==
- Twynam, W. C. (1916). The First P. & O. Voyage to the East. Tellippalai, Ceylon: American Ceylon Mission Press. – A sixteen-page privately printed memoir of P&O's inaugural voyage to Ceylon/India in 1842. This pamphlet recounts Twynam's experiences as a passenger on the steamship Hindostan and the journey's significance in opening the overland and sea route to the East from England.
- Twynam, W. C. (1902). Report on the Ceylon Pearl Fisheries, 1899. Colombo: H. C. Cottle (Acting Government Printer). – A sixty-six page official report summarizing the pearl oyster fisheries of the Gulf of Mannar, with appendices and a detailed map of the pearl banks.
- Twynam, W. C. (1889). "The Ceylon Turtle." Ceylon Literary Register. – An article documenting the species of marine turtles found in Ceylon's waters.
