= Kuttam Pokuna =

Pair of old pools in Sri Lanka

- කුට්ටම් පොකුණ (Sinhala)
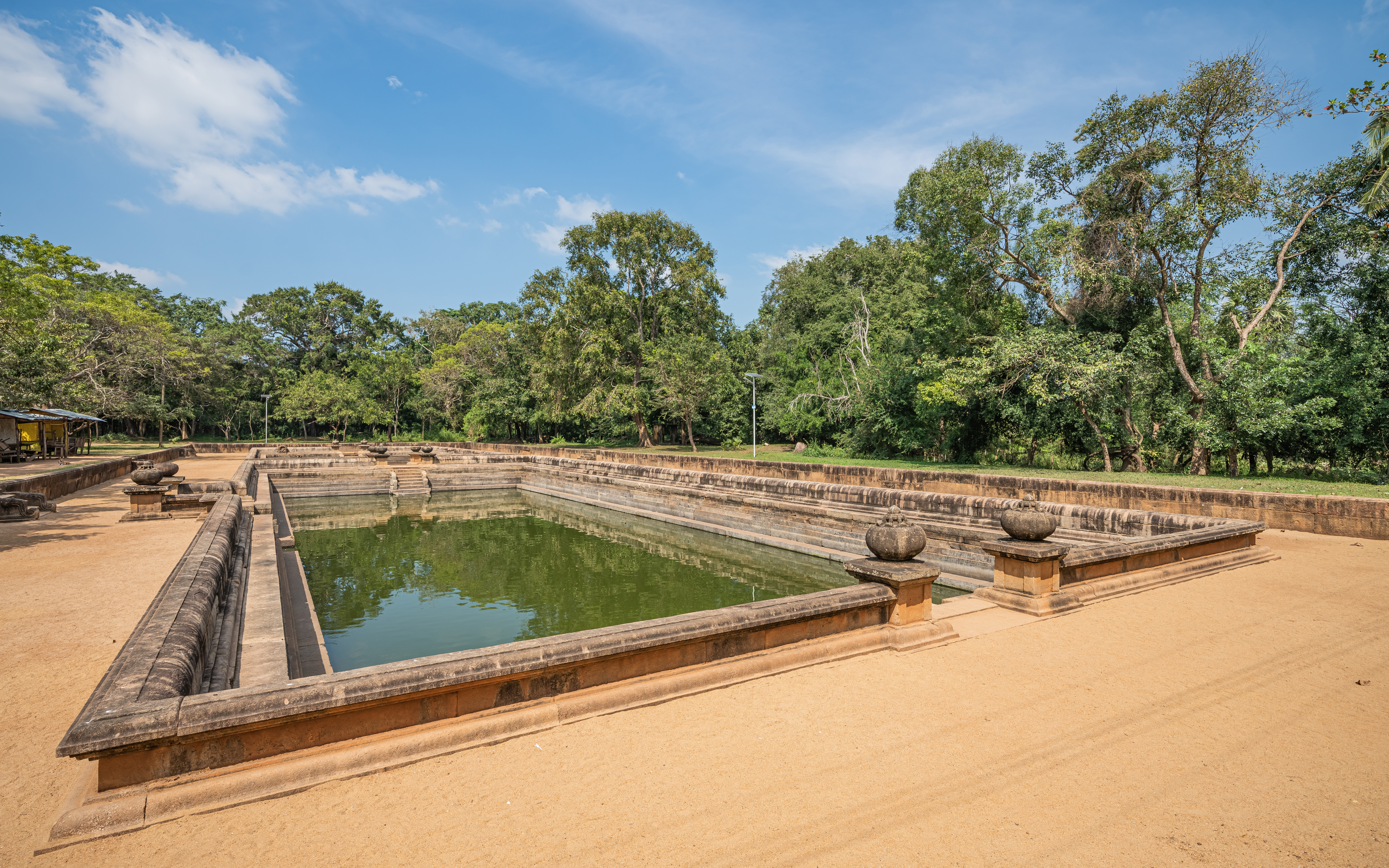
- Kuttam Pokuna viewed from the south

- Location within Sri Lanka
- 8°22′16″N 80°24′06″E
- Location: Abhayagiri vihāra complex, Anuradhapura, Sri Lanka

Site notes
- Restored: 1885; 1955
- Restored by: Robert Wilson Ievers; Department of Archaeology

Archaeological Protected Monument of Sri Lanka

Kuttam Pokuna (twin ponds or pools) are well preserved old bathing tanks or ponds in Sri Lanka. This pair of ponds was built by the Sinhalese in the ancient Anuradhapura Kingdom. They form part of the Abhayagiri vihāra complex and are an example of the works in the field of hydrological engineering, architecture and art of the ancient Sinhalese.

== Location ==
On a map of the Abhayagiri vihāra complex over thirty bodies of water can be counted. The largest of these is the Eth Pokuna (Elephant Pond). The Kuttam Pokuna are located on the eastern edge of the complex.

== History ==
Not much is known about the history of these ponds. They are generally believed to be built during the reign of king Aggabodhi I of Anuradhapura (575–608). The Central Cultural Fund, Colombo, Sri Lanka, however, names the eighth or ninth century as the time of building.

The name Twin Ponds is misleading, because they are not of the same age: The smaller northern pond (see below) is said to be older than the larger southern pond.

== Gallery ==
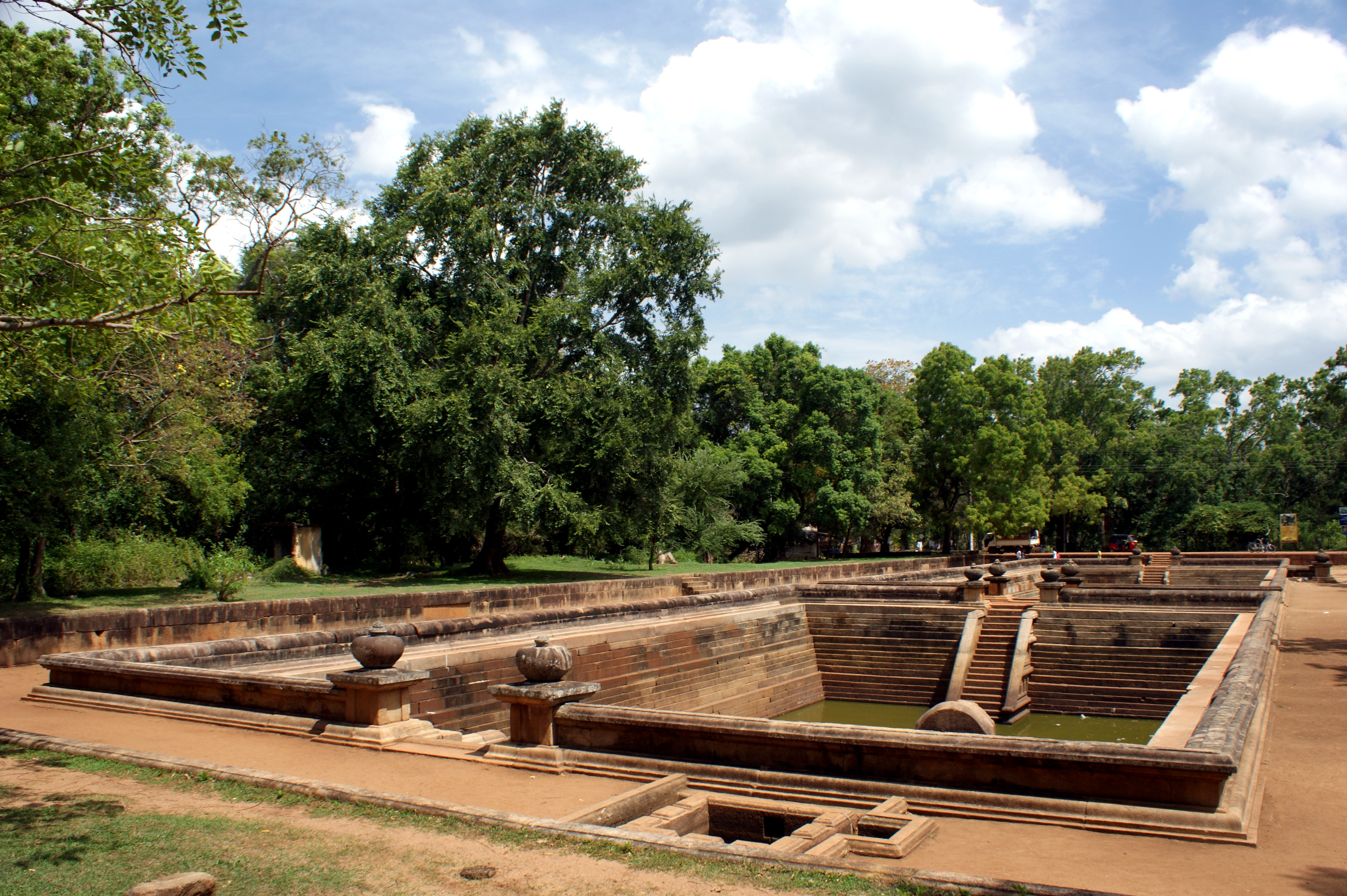
View of the ponds from the north

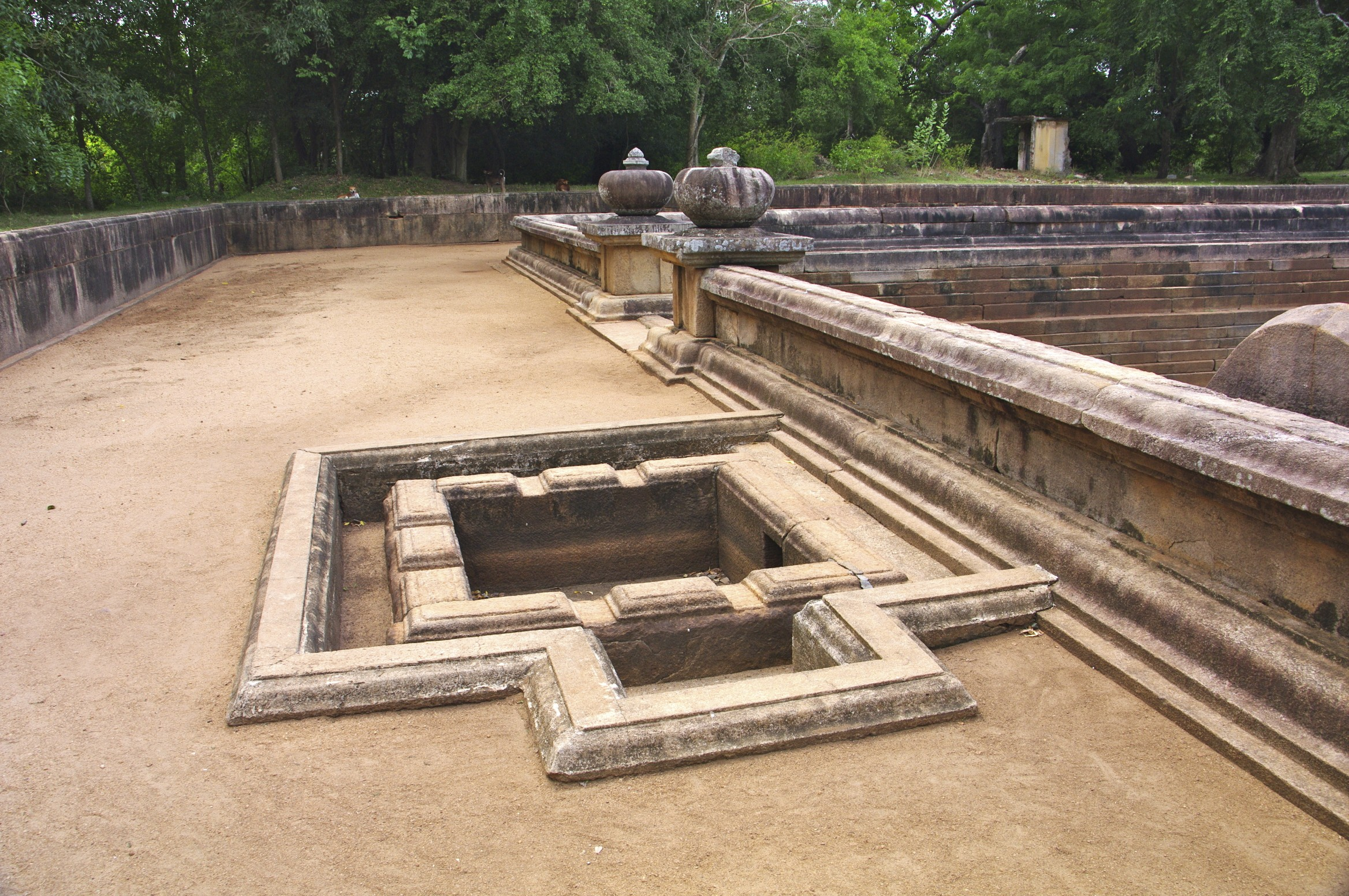
The filter system

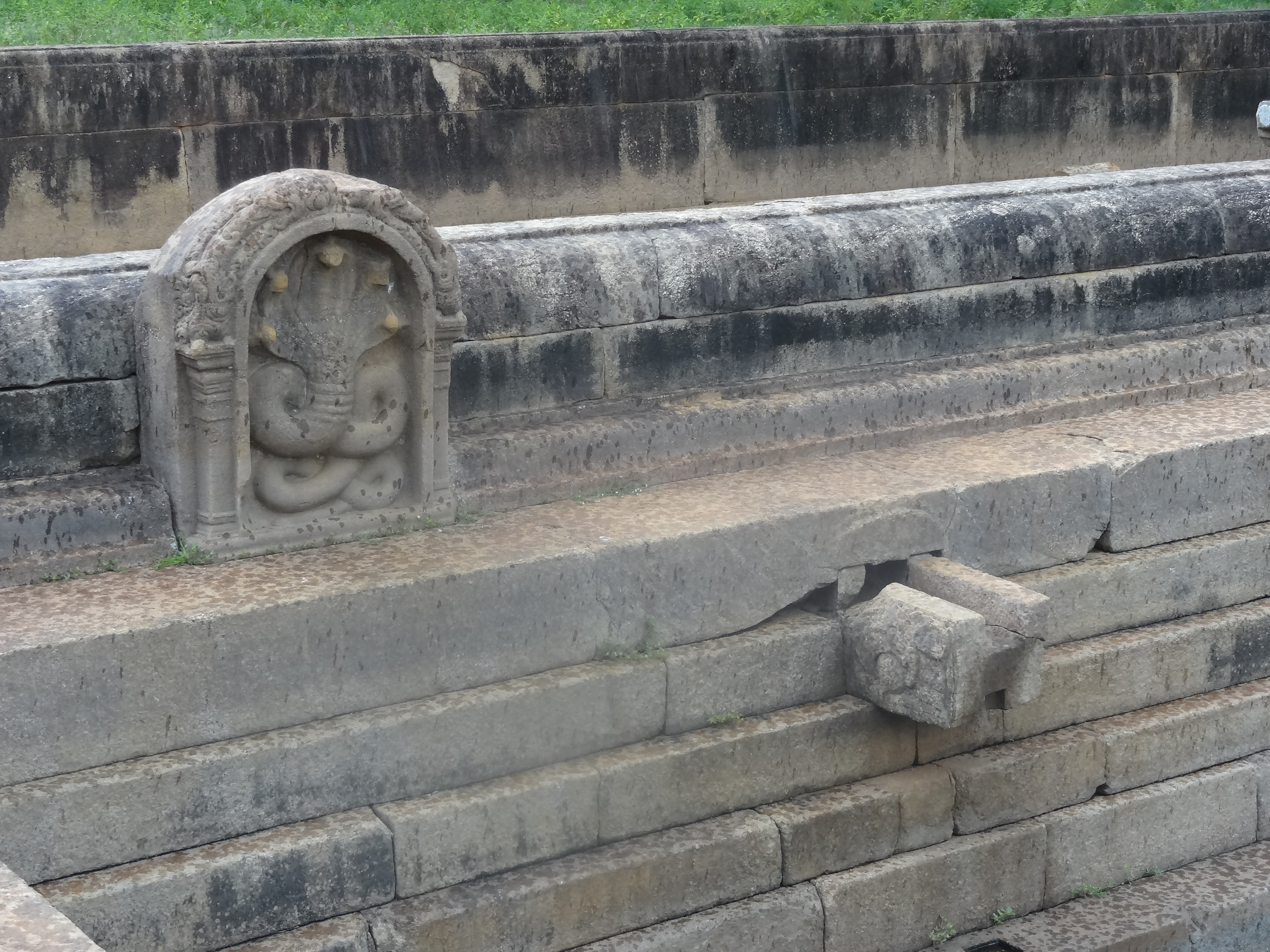
Nāga sculpture and stone spout in north pond

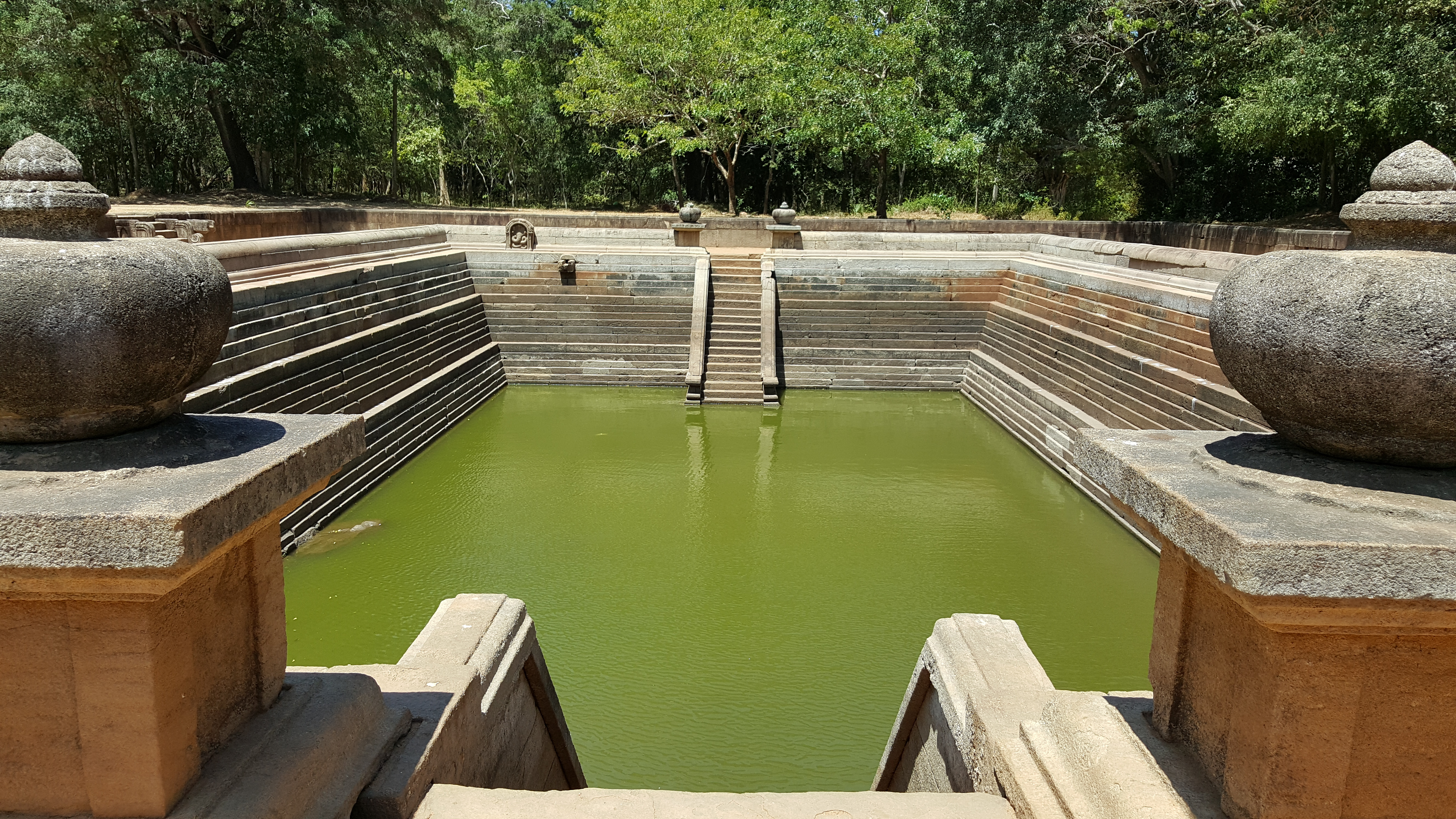
North pond from the south

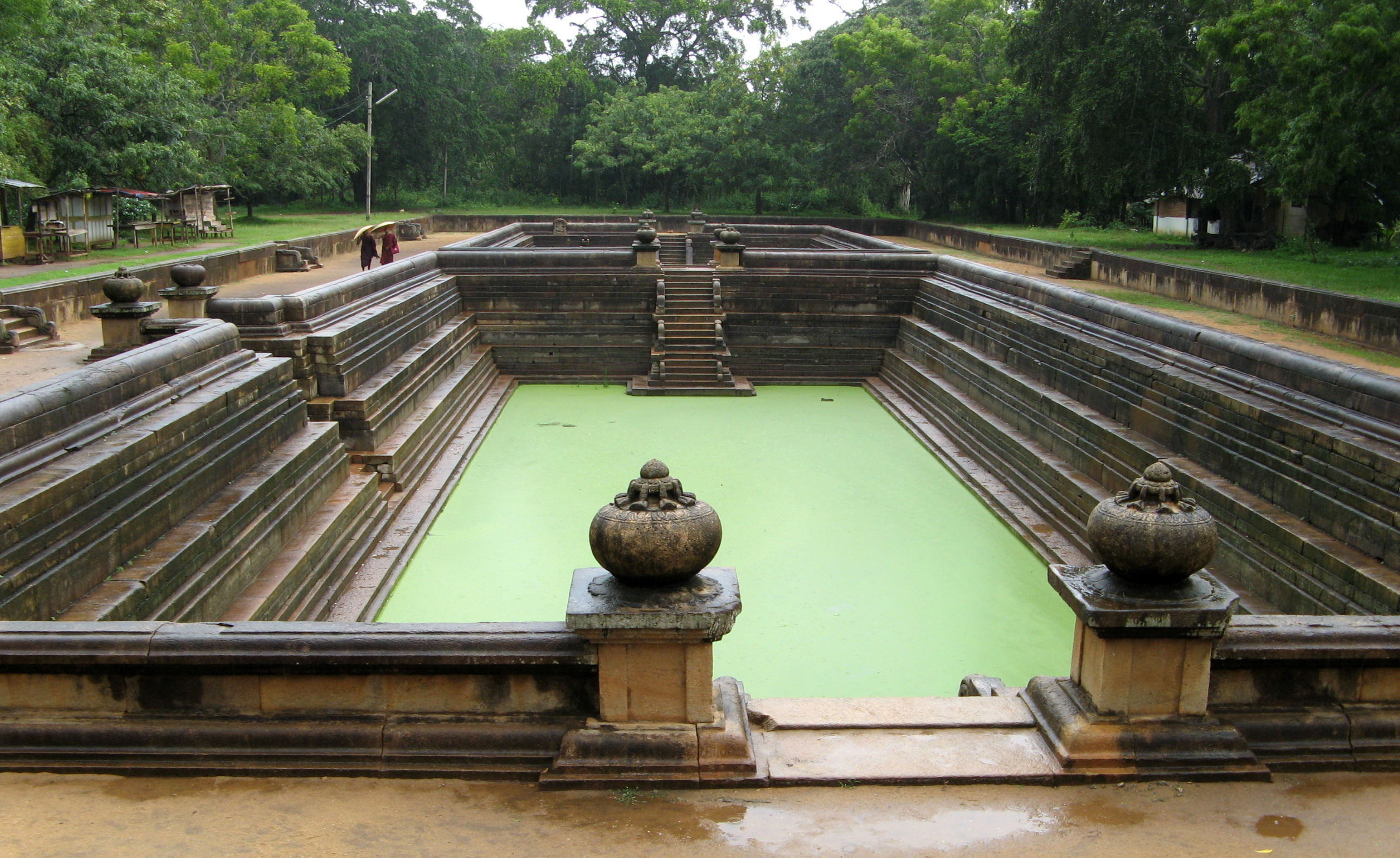
South pond from the south

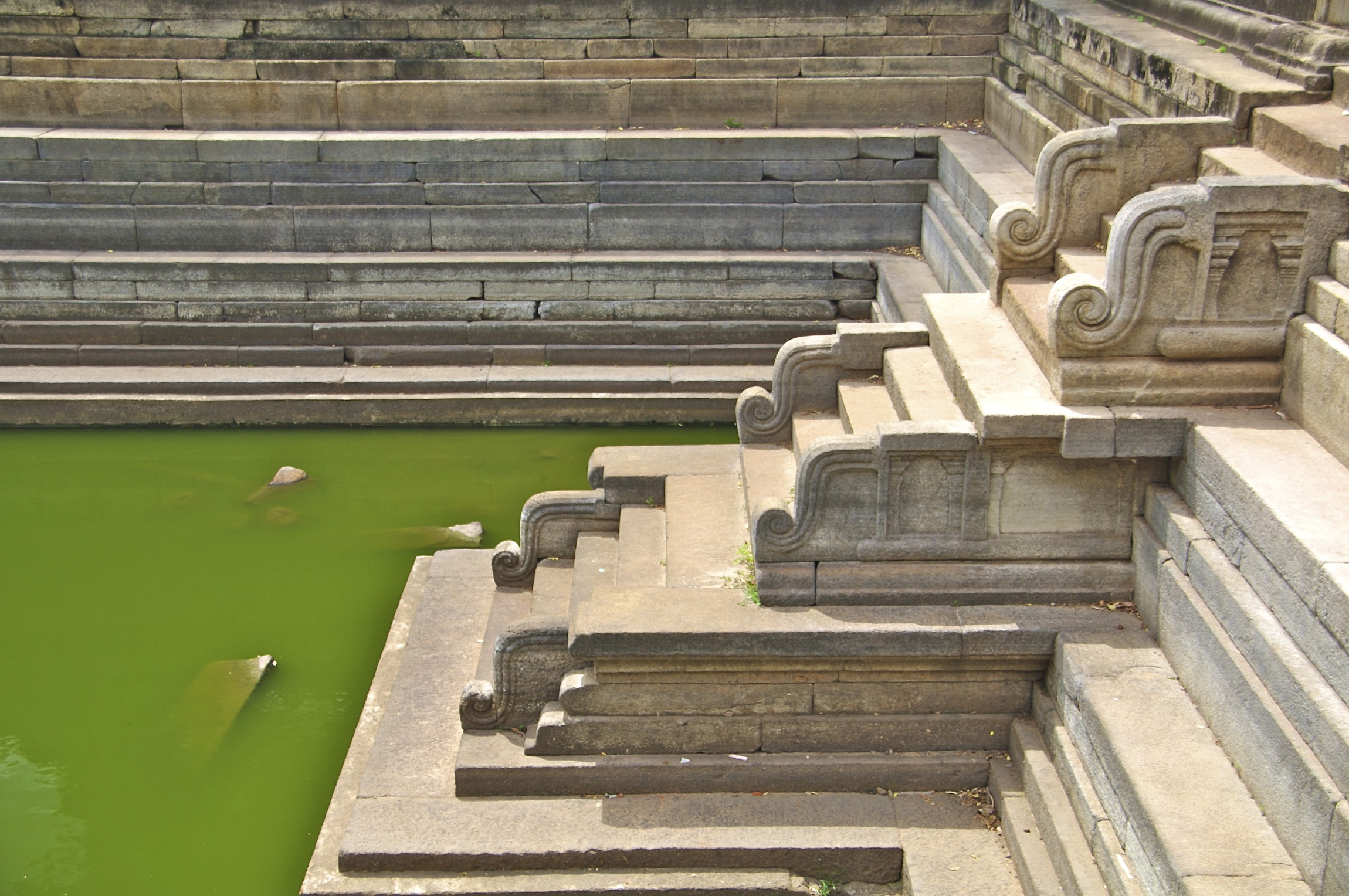
Stairs of the south pond

== Architecture ==
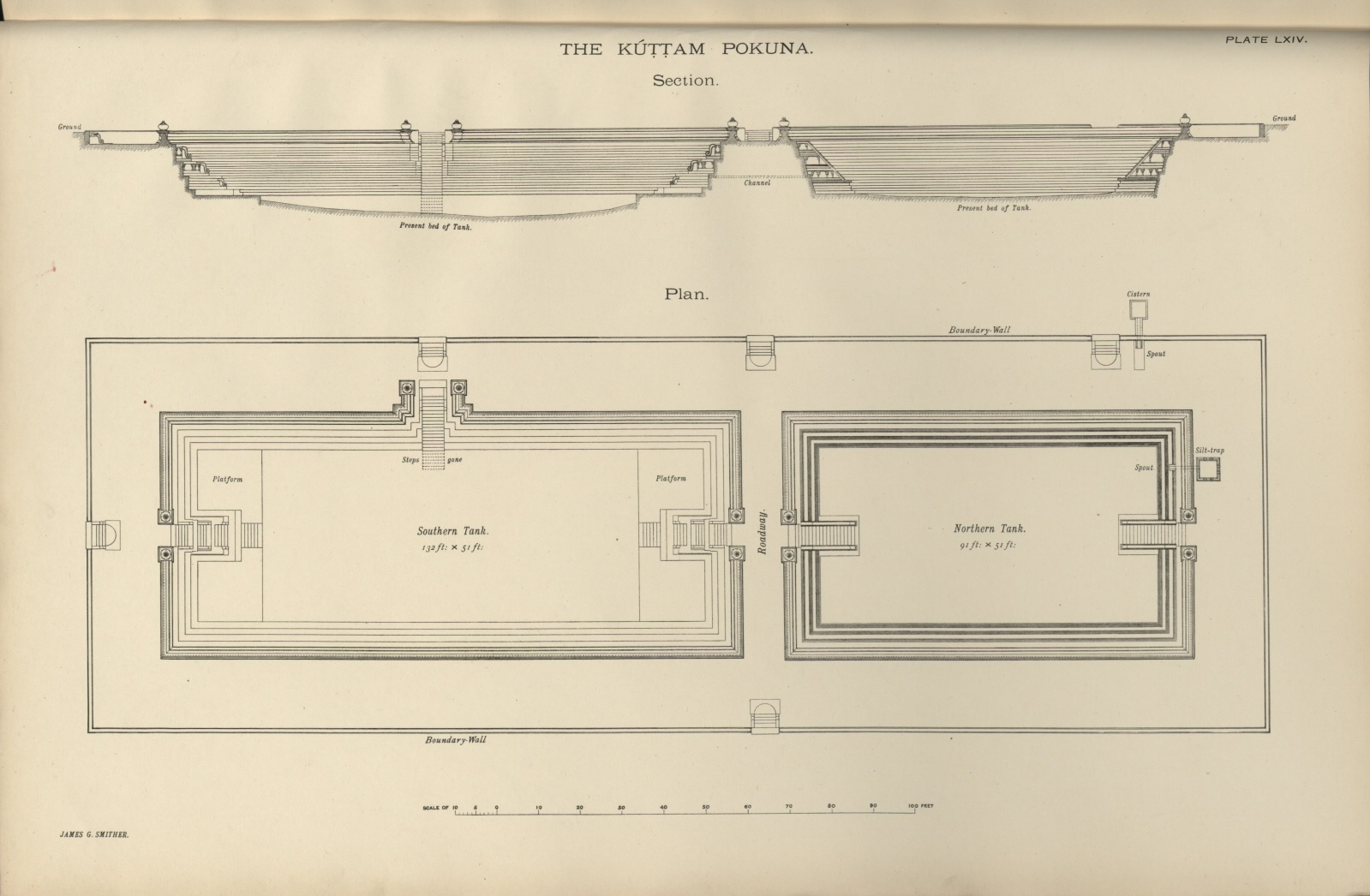
Architectural drawing of Kuttam Pokuna (1894) by James Smither

=== The compound ===
The two ponds are built in a 0.91 metres (3 ft) deep, rectangular depression lined with a low wall. Five short stairs lead from the ground level into it. Next to one of these short stairs, in the northwest corner of the compound, a stone spout protrudes from the wall. According to older descriptions of the twin ponds the spout was supported by a small sculpture of a lion. However, in recent photographs there is no sign of such a sculpture. The spout is the overflow of a small cistern on the other side of the wall.

=== The ponds ===
The larger, southern pond is 40 metres (132 ft) by 16 metres (51 ft), while the smaller, northern pond is 28 metres (91 ft) by 16 metres (51 ft). The depths of the two ponds is 4.3 metres (14 ft) and 5.5 metres (18 ft) for the smaller pond and the larger pond respectively. The space between wall surrounding the compound and the two ponds is 18 feet (5.5 m).

A parapet was built around each of the ponds. The faces of the ponds are cut granite slabs as are the bottom and the sides of the ponds. The ponds are made wider at the top than at the bottom, giving them a stepped slope, with steps too narrow to descend. Flights of stairs are seen on the northern and southern ends of the ponds. The southern pond has an additional flight of stairs on the western side. Unlike the other stairs, these do not protrude from the side of the pond. The stairs lead to the bottom of the pond and are decorated with punkalas, or pots of abundance, and scroll design.

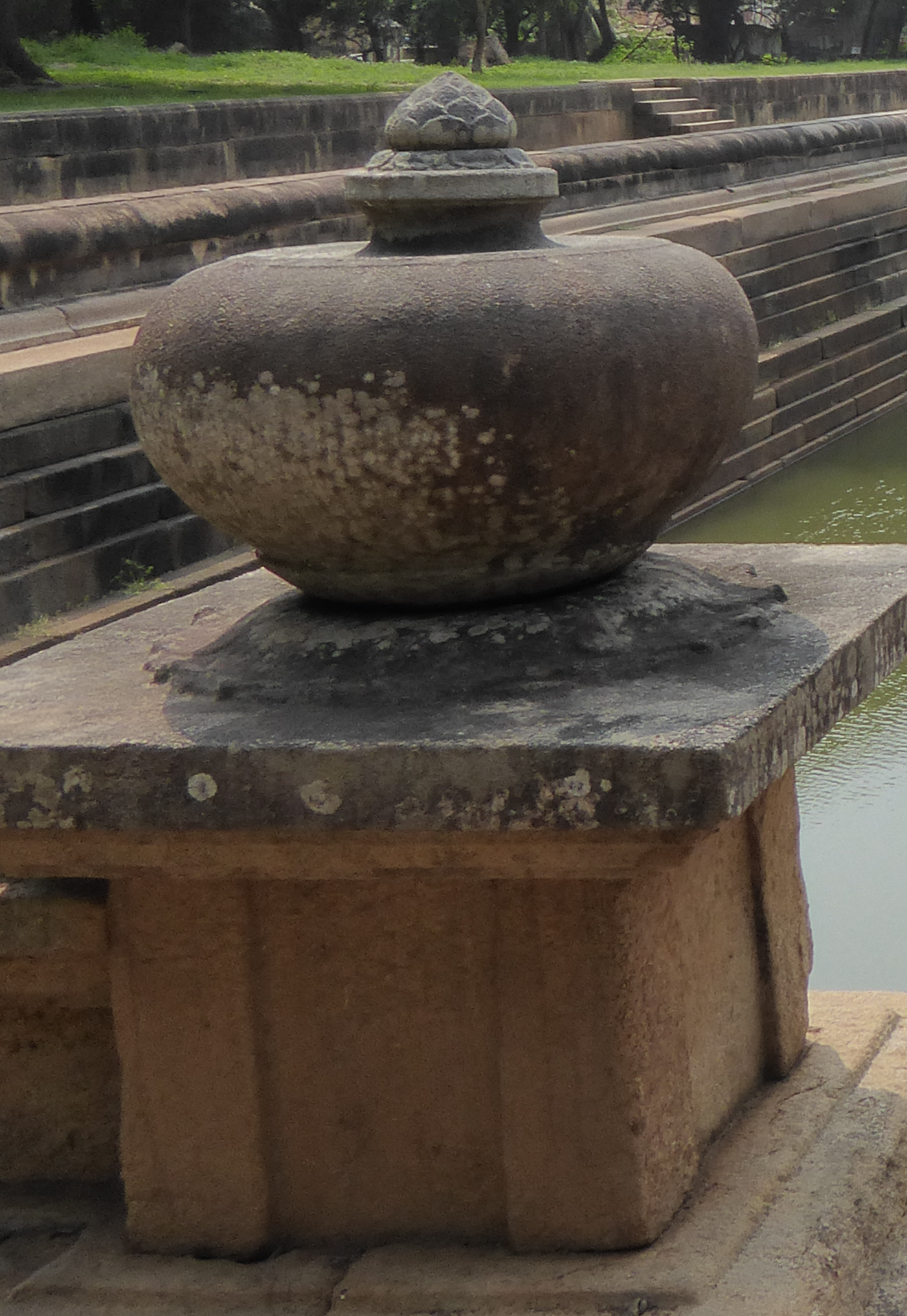
Punkala of north pond

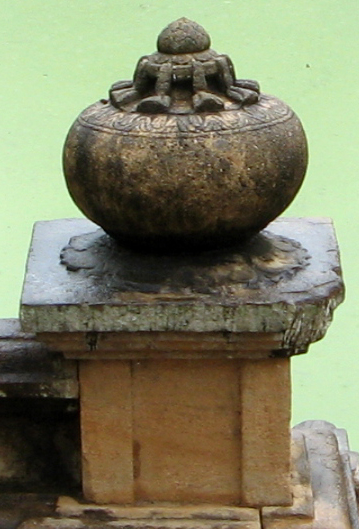
Punkala of south pond

Although the ponds look very much alike at first glance, there are marked differences. The punkalas of the larger pond are more ornate, for example, and so are the banisters of the stairs (see below). The sides of the large pond also have terraces on several levels, which are broad enough to walk or sit on and can be reached from the stairs.

The northern side of the small pond is adorned with a sculpture of a five-hooded cobra (Nāga) under an arch of makaras. Another makara shape can still be recognised in the nearby stone spout.

=== The silt trap ===
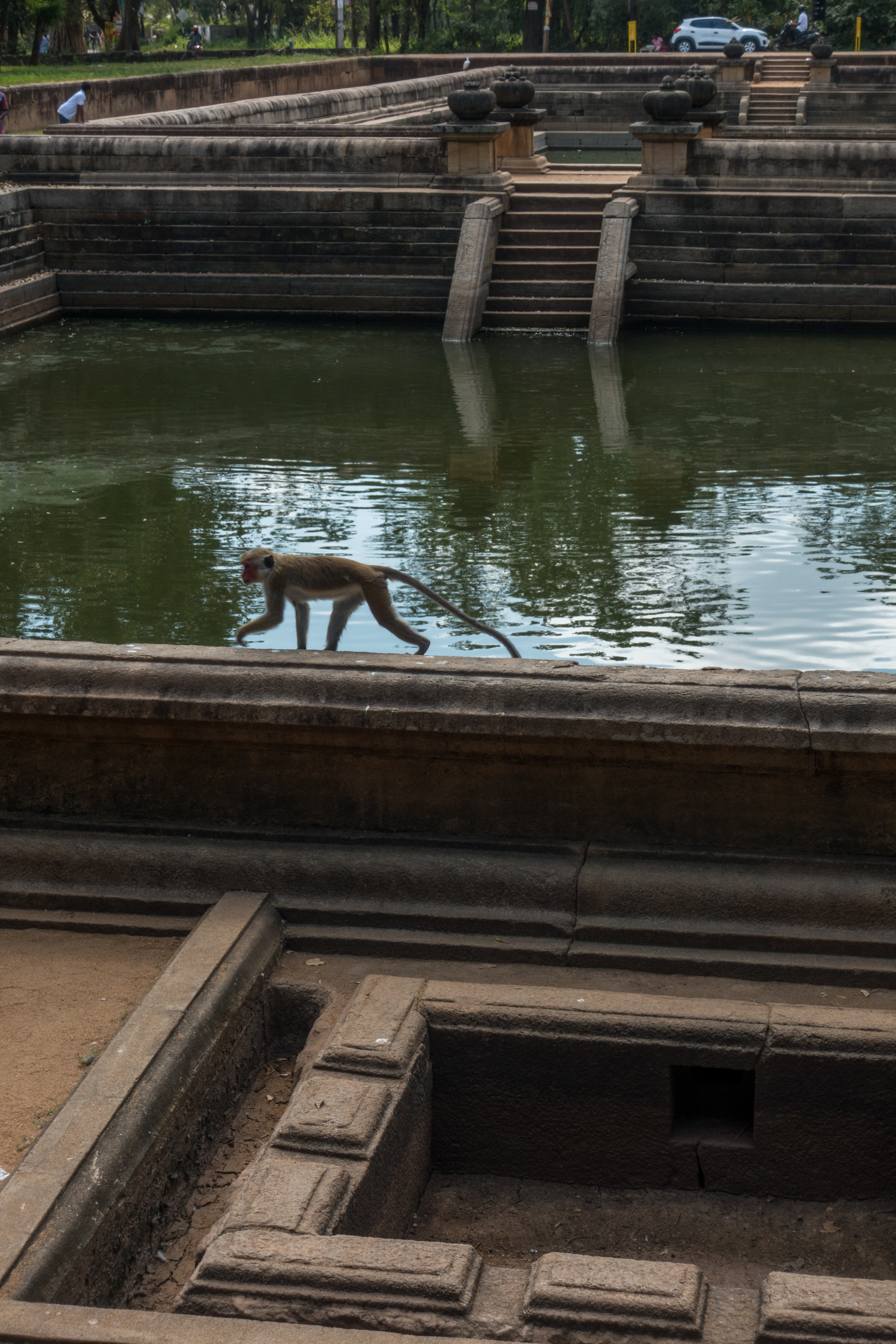
North pond with silt trap outlet

Outside the parapet of the small pond, there is a silt trap. The outlet of this structure towards the stone spout in the pond wall is 330 millimetres (13 in) above the bottom.

=== Underground channel ===
A stone underground channel of 110 millimetres (4.5 in) wide, 130 millimetres (5 in) high and 2.4 metres (8 ft) feet, 230 millimetres (9 in) below the surface, connects both ponds. Because the opening into the channel is well above the bottom of the smaller pond, this would act as a filtering mechanism for the larger pond.

=== Water flow ===
Water was transported from a rainwater reservoir over a distance for 3 km (1.9 mi) to the ponds through underground ducts. Before the water entered the northern pond via the stone spout in the northern wall, it passed through the filter system. Through an underground duct the water passed from the north pond to the south pond. Eventually the water was drained from both ponds through a drain on the bottom of the small pond, to be used to water nearby rice fields.

The ponds themselves were used by the Abhayagiri vihāra monks to bathe. However, some sources speak of the baths being used by kings and queens.

== Restorations ==
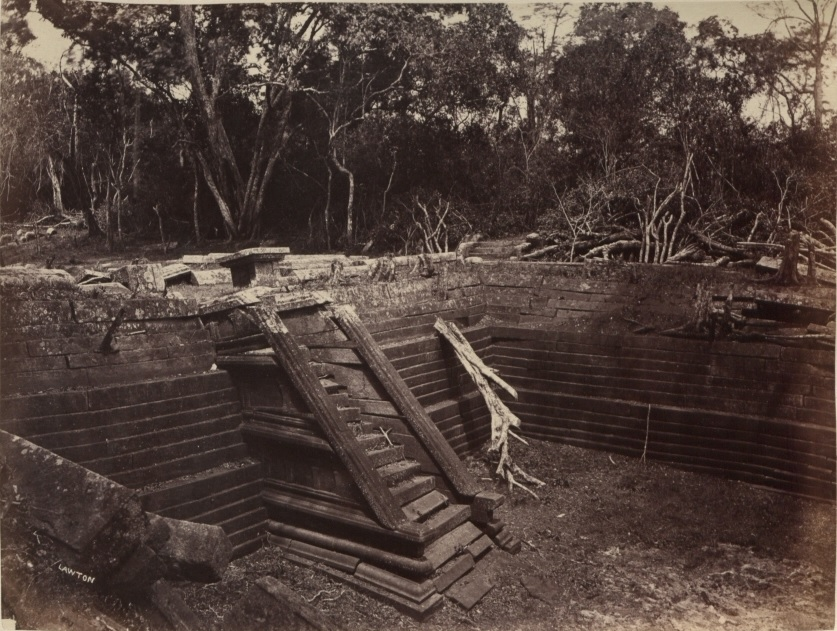
Stairs of northern pond ±1870

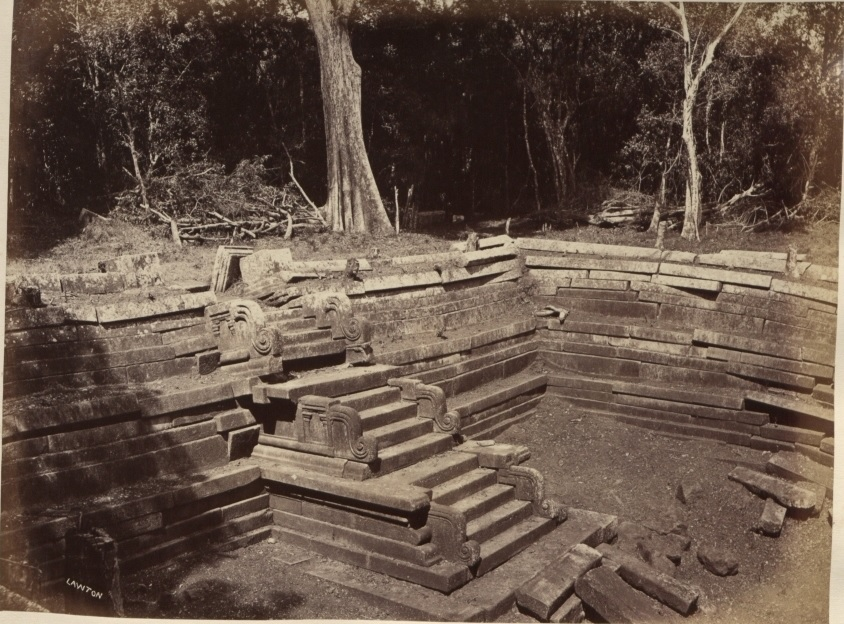
Stairs of southern pond ±1870

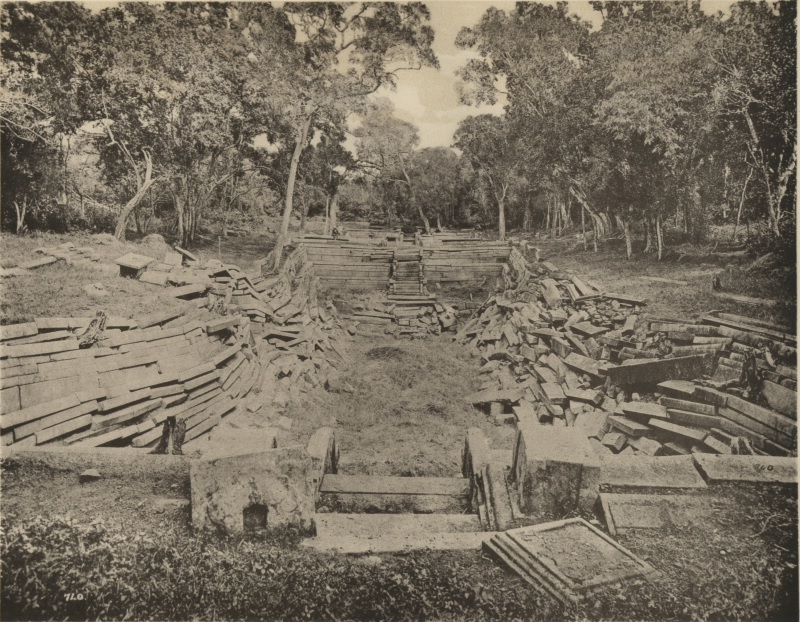
Unrestored southern pond

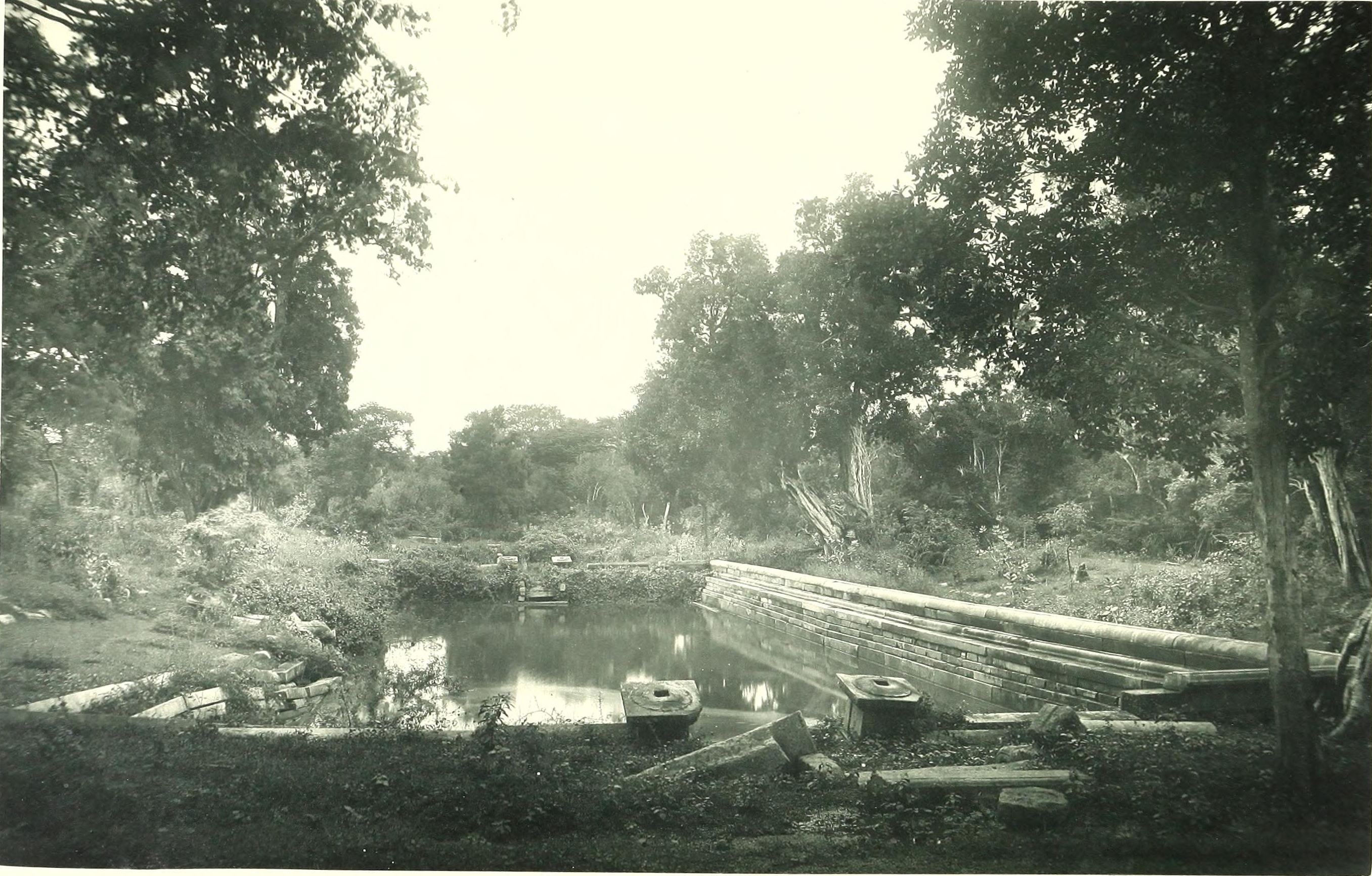
Partly restored southern pond ±1896

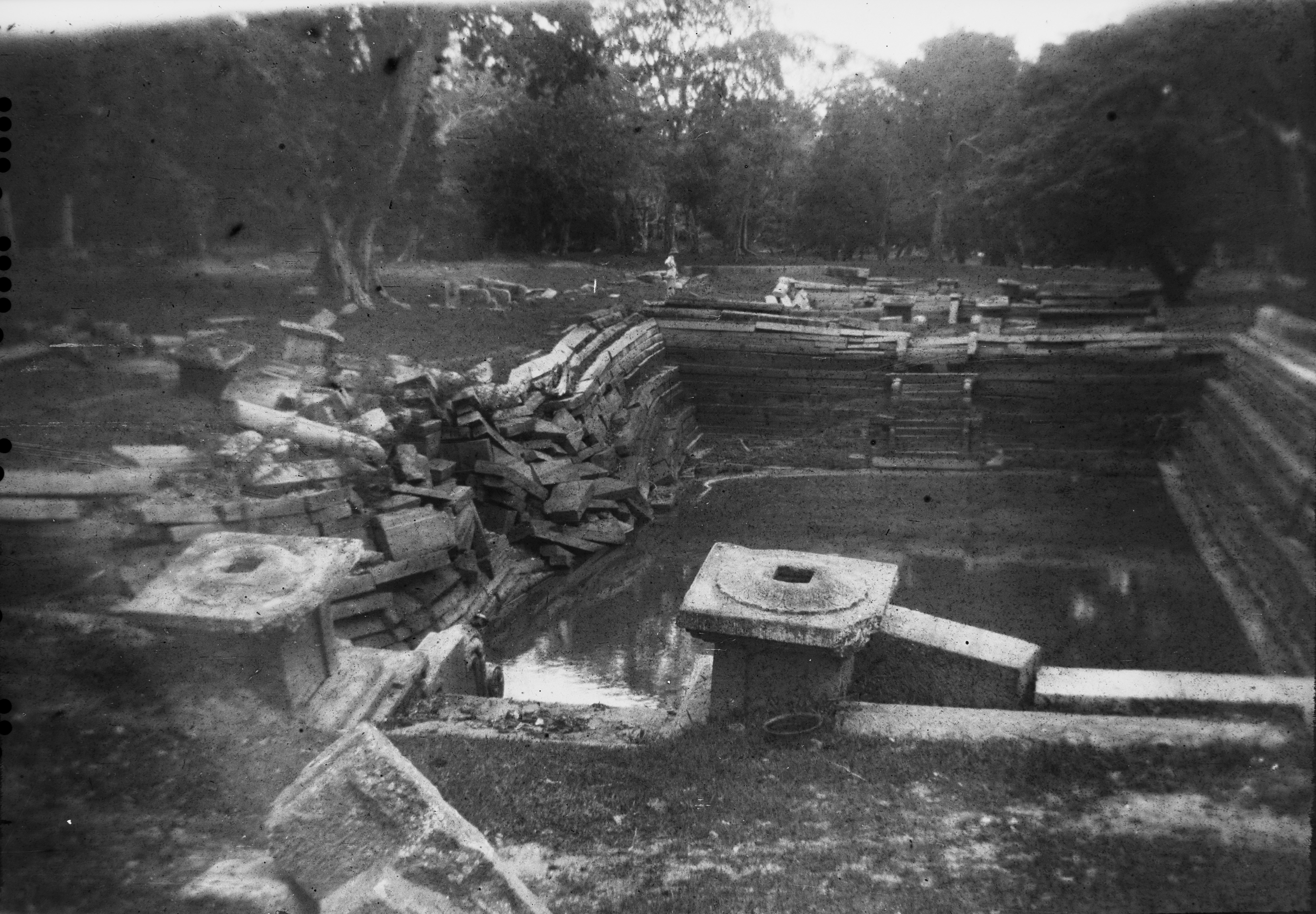
Kuttam Pokuna in 1923

After having been left unattended for centuries, part of the Kuttam Pokuna was restored by Robert Wilson Ievers (Government Agent of the North Central Province) during the period 1885 to 1892. Unfortunately, several of the large parapet stones of the northern pond were used to restore the lower eastern side of the southern pond. Because of this, not all stones could be placed in their original positions during the later full restoration (see below).

Between 1950 and 1955 the ponds were fully restored, including the surrounding compound wall. Most of the original punkalas turned out to be missing. They had either been stolen or destroyed. These punkalas were replaced by faithful, concrete copies of the ones that were found on the site. The underground drain was left unrestored.

Senarath Paranavithana, Archaeological Commissioner of the Department of Archaeology of Sri Lanka from 1940 to 1956, was actively involved in the restoration of the ponds. During the restoration activities, a metal pot was found on the bottom of one of the ponds. In it were some small figurines, like a frog, a tortoise, a crab, several fish, a metal conch and a dancing woman. These artifacts are now in the Anuradhapura Museum.

== See also ==
- Abhayavapi
- Dhunge dhara
- Pathaha Pokuna
- Ranmasu Uyana
- Tissa Wewa (Anuradhapura)
