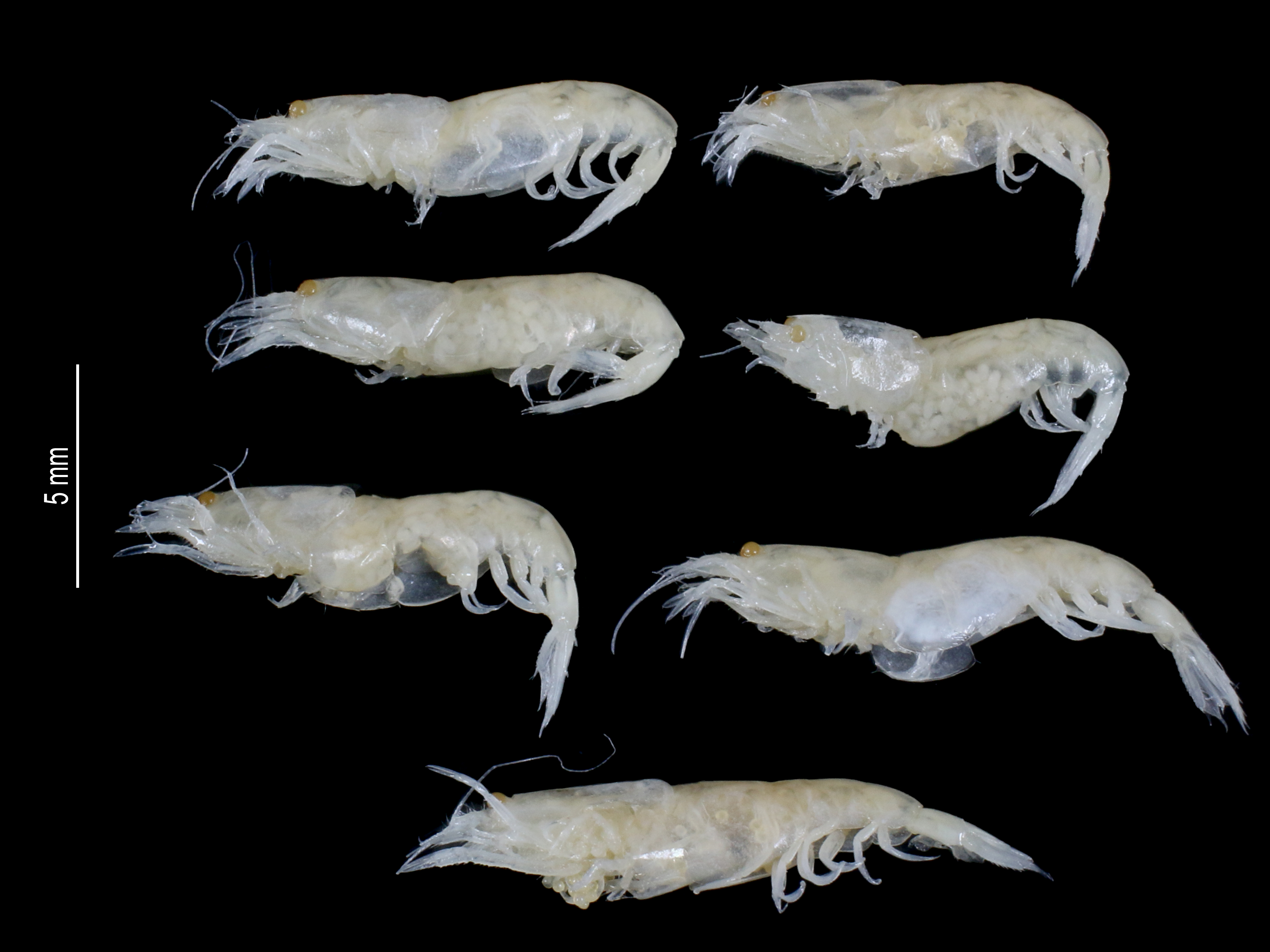
- Leptochela chacei

Scientific classification
- Kingdom: Animalia
- Phylum: Arthropoda
- Class: Malacostraca
- Order: Decapoda
- Suborder: Pleocyemata
- Infraorder: Caridea
- Family: Pasiphaeidae
- Genus: Leptochela; Stimpson, 1860

Type species
- Leptochela gracilis Stimpson, 1860

= Leptochela =

Genus of crustaceans

Leptochela is a genus of small, shallow-water shrimp from the family Pasiphaeidae. They are found in the Indo-Pacific region and the western Atlantic with an isolated species in Hawaii, they are absent from the eastern Atlantic Ocean and were absent from the eastern Pacific but specimens of a species widespread in the western Atlantic were collected from waters to the south of the tip of Baja California. Two species, Leptochela aculeocaudata and Leptochela pugnax have invaded the eastern Mediterranean from the Red Sea through the Suez Canal and are thus classified as Lessepsian migrants.

== Species ==
The genus is split into two subgenera Leptochela and Proboloura and contains 17 currently recognised extant species.

=== Leptochela ===
- Leptochela aculeocaudata Paul'son, 1875
- Leptochela bermudensis Gurney, 1939
- Leptochela chacei Hayashi, 1995
- Leptochela crosnieri Hayashi, 1995
- Leptochela elevata Vereshchaka, 2024
- Leptochela gracilis Stimpson, 1860
- Leptochela hawaiiensis Chace, 1976
- Leptochela irrobusta Chace, 1976
- Leptochela japonica Hayashi & Miyake, 1969
- Leptochela papulata Chace, 1976
- Leptochela pugnax de Man, 1916
- Leptochela robusta Stimpson, 1860
- Leptochela serratorbita Spence Bate, 1888
- Leptochela sydniensis Dakin & Colefax, 1940

=== Proboloura ===
- Leptochela carinata Ortmann, 1893
- Leptochela soelae Hanamura, 1987
