= Tegastidae =

Scientific classification
- Kingdom: Animalia
- Phylum: Arthropoda
- Clade: Pancrustacea
- Class: Copepoda
- Order: Harpacticoida
- Family: Tegastidae; G. O. Sars, 1904

Family of crustaceans

Tegastidae is a family of copepods, which are characterised by having laterally compressed bodies (resembling that of an amphipod), a claw-like mandible in the nauplius stage, and by a modified male genital complex. Species have been described in seven genera. Two species of Smacigastes are found at hydrothermal vents, while the remaining species are found in shallow water, associated with algae, bryozoans and cnidarians, such as corals.

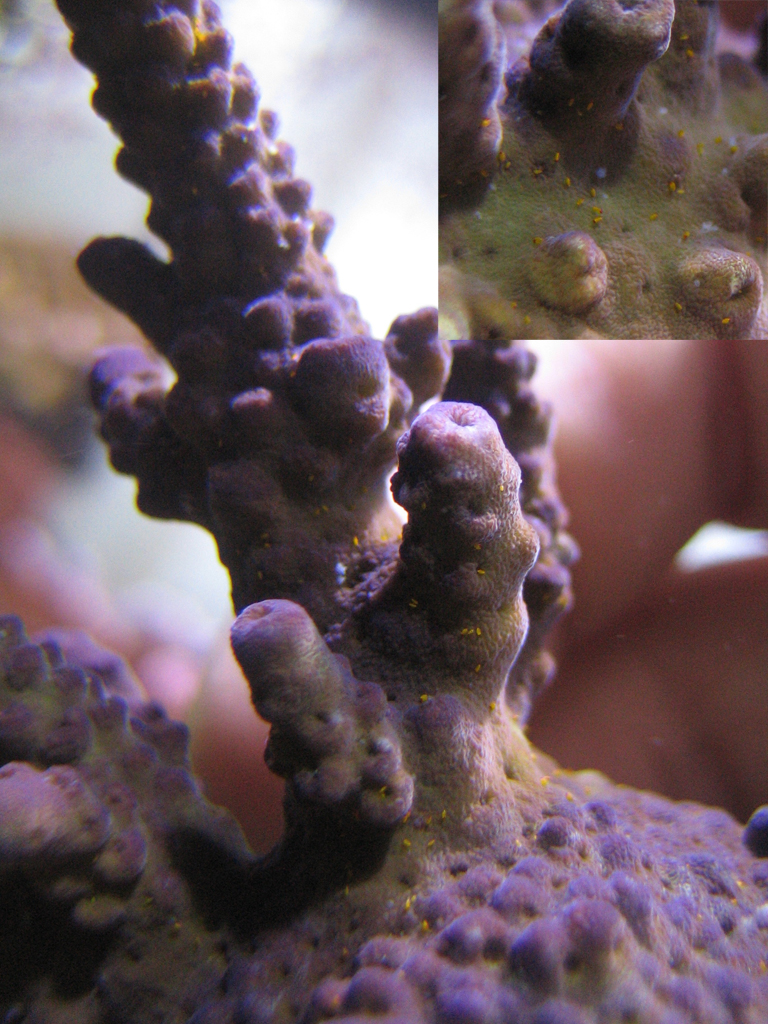
An infestation of Tegastes on an acroporid

The seven genera are:

- Aglaogastes Huys, 2016
- Arawella Cottarelli & Baldari, 1987
- Feregastes Fiers, 1986
- Parategastes Sars, 1904
- Smacigastes Ivanenko & Defaye, 2004
- Syngastes Monard, 1924
- Tegastes Norman, 1903
