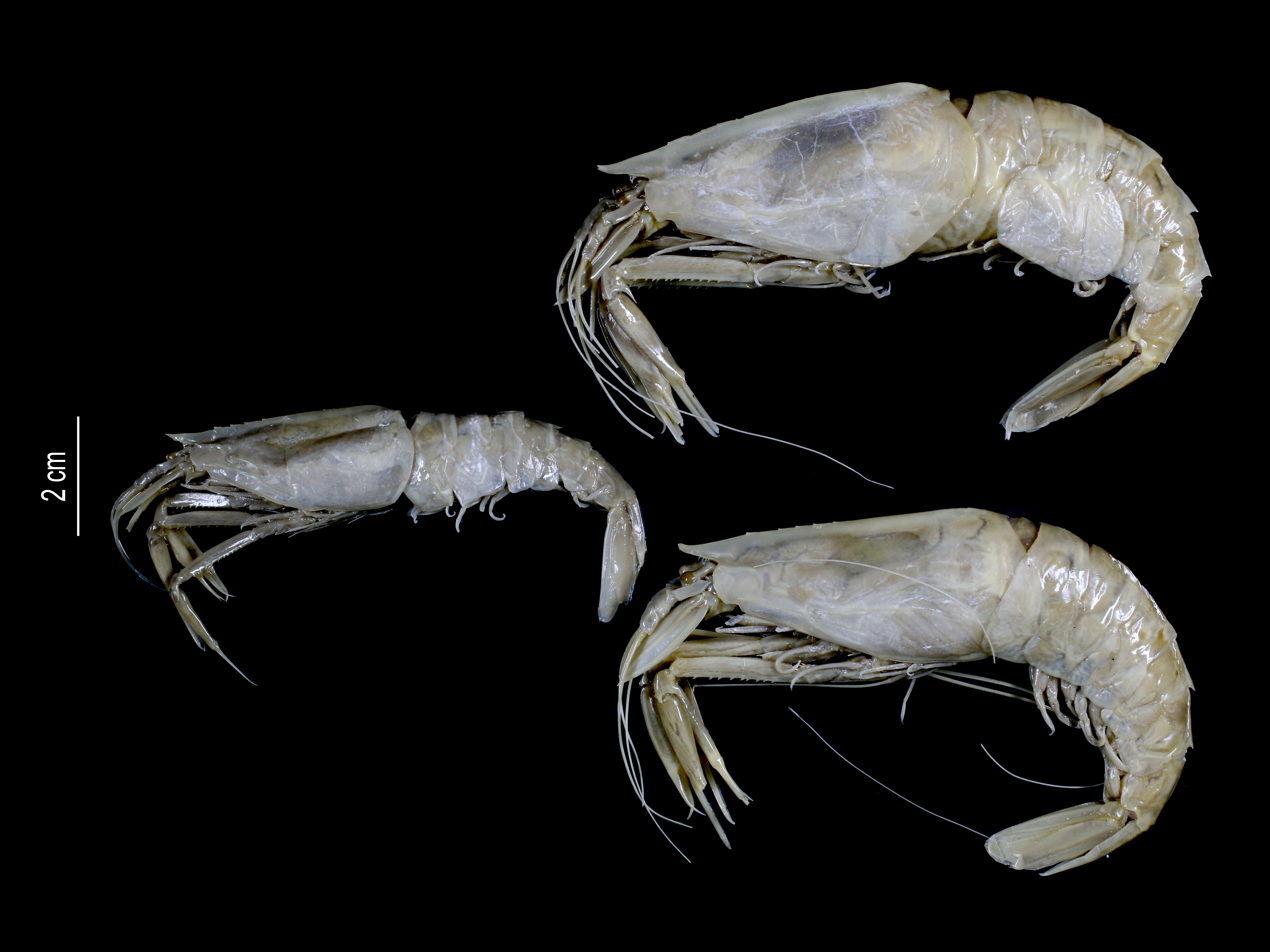

Scientific classification
- Domain: Eukaryota
- Kingdom: Animalia
- Phylum: Arthropoda
- Class: Malacostraca
- Order: Decapoda
- Suborder: Pleocyemata
- Infraorder: Caridea
- Family: Pasiphaeidae
- Genus: Glyphus; Filhol, 1884

Type species
- Glyphus marsupialis Filhol,1884

= Glyphus =

Genus of crustaceans

Glyphus is a genus of shrimp from the family Pasiphaeidae, first described by Henri Filhol in 1884. The type species is Glyphus marsupialis, by monotypy.

In La vie au fonds des mers, Filhol describes it as being found at depths of 882 m between the Canaries and Cap Vert.
