= Delavalia =

Scientific classification
- Domain: Eukaryota
- Kingdom: Animalia
- Phylum: Arthropoda
- Class: Copepoda
- Order: Harpacticoida
- Family: Miraciidae
- Subfamily: Stenheliinae
- Genus: Delavalia; Brady, 1868

Species
- See text

Synonyms
- Spio Brady & Robertson, 1876 (preoccupied by Spio Fabricius, 1785); Stenhelia (Delavalia) Brady, 1868

Genus of crustacean

Delavalia is a genus of copepods in the family Miraciidae.

== Species ==
The World Register of Marine Species currently lists the following species as accepted within Delavalia:

- Delavalia acutirostris (Willey, 1935)
- Delavalia adriatica (Marinov & Apostolov, 1981)
- Delavalia andamanica (Rao, 1993)
- Delavalia arctica Scott T., 1899
- Delavalia arenicola (Wilson C.B., 1932)
- Delavalia bermudensis (Coull, 1969)
- Delavalia bifidia (Coull, 1967)
- Delavalia breviseta (Wells & Rao, 1987)
- Delavalia clavus (Wells & Rao, 1987)
- Delavalia coineauae (Soyer, 1972)
- Delavalia confluens (Lang, 1948)
- Delavalia cornuta (Lang, 1936)
- Delavalia diegensis (Thistle & Coull, 1979)
- Delavalia elisabethae (Por, 1959)
- Delavalia fustiger (Wells & Rao, 1987)
- Delavalia giesbrechti Scott T., 1896
- Delavalia gundulae (Willen, 2003)
- Delavalia hirtipes (Wells & Rao, 1987)
- Delavalia incerta (Por, 1964)
- Delavalia inopinata Scott A., 1902
- Delavalia intermedia (Marinov & Apostolov, 1981)
- Delavalia islandica (Schriever, 1982)
- Delavalia latioperculata Itô Tat, 1981
- Delavalia latipes (Lang, 1965)
- Delavalia latisetosa (Sewell, 1940)
- Delavalia lima (Becker & Schriever, 1979)
- Delavalia longicaudata (Boeck, 1872)
- Delavalia longifurca (Sewell, 1934)
- Delavalia longipilosa (Lang, 1965)
- Delavalia madrasensis (Wells, 1971)
- Delavalia magnacaudata (Monard, 1928)
- Delavalia mastigochaeta (Wells, 1965)
- Delavalia minuta Scott A., 1902
- Delavalia mixta (Wells & Rao, 1987)
- Delavalia noodti (Schriever, 1982)
- Delavalia normani Scott T., 1905
- Delavalia nuwukensis (Wilson, M.S., 1965)
- Delavalia oblonga (Lang, 1965)
- Delavalia ornamentalia (Shen & Tai, 1965)
- Delavalia palustris Brady, 1868
- Delavalia paraclavus (Wells & Rao, 1987)
- Delavalia polluta (Monard, 1928)
- Delavalia reflexa Brady & Robertson, 1876
- Delavalia saharae (Marinov & Apostolov, 1985)
- Delavalia schminkei (Willen, 2002)
- Delavalia stephensoni (Greenwood & Tucker, 1984)
- Delavalia tethysensis (Monard, 1928)
- Delavalia truncatipes (Sewell, 1940)
- Delavalia unisetosa (Wells, 1967)
- Delavalia valens (Wells & Rao, 1987)
