= Stenhelia =

Scientific classification
- Domain: Eukaryota
- Kingdom: Animalia
- Phylum: Arthropoda
- Class: Copepoda
- Order: Harpacticoida
- Family: Miraciidae
- Subfamily: Stenheliinae
- Genus: Stenhelia; Boeck, 1865

Genus of crustaceans

Stenhelia is a genus of copepods belonging to the family Miraciidae.

The genus has cosmopolitan distribution.

== Species ==
Species in the genus include:

- Stenhelia bifida Coull, 1976
- Stenhelia brevicornis Thompson & Scott, 1903
