= Syngastes =

Scientific classification
- Kingdom: Animalia
- Phylum: Arthropoda
- Class: Copepoda
- Order: Harpacticoida
- Family: Tegastidae
- Genus: Syngastes; A. Monard, 1924

Type species
- Syngastes clausii (Thomson, 1883)

Genus of harpacticoid copepods

Syngastes is a genus of minute marine copepods in the order Harpacticoida and family Tegastidae. Like other tegastid copepods, Syngastes species have a laterally compressed body form (flattened side-to-side) adapted to clinging onto substrates in shallow marine habitats. They are often found in symbiotic or commensal association with other marine invertebrates (such as corals, bryozoans, mollusks, or polychaete worms). They were historically referred to as “parasitic” copepods, but like other tegastids, many Syngastes species occur as ecto‑associates of invertebrates; most associations are interpreted as commensal rather than parasitic (they typically do not harm their hosts). The genus was established in 1924 by Swiss zoologist Albert Monard to encompass several species formerly placed in the genus Tegastes.

== Taxonomic classification ==
Syngastes belongs to the harpacticoid copepods (order Harpacticoida) within the class Copepoda, and is a member of the family Tegastidae. Tegastidae are characterized by having strongly flattened, amphipod-like bodies with ventrolateral extensions on the exoskeleton. Within Tegastidae, Syngastes is one of several genera distinguished by subtle morphological differences in their appendages and body segmentation.

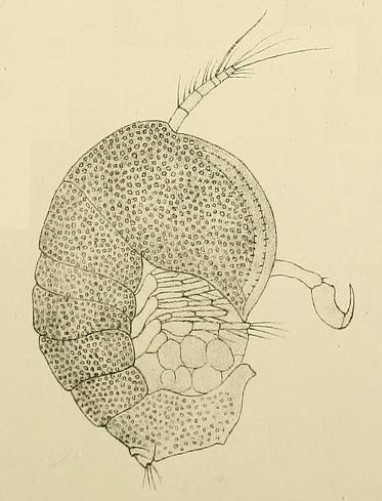
Syngastes twynami

The type species of Syngastes is Syngastes clausii (Thomson, 1883), by subsequent designation. It was originally described as Amymone clausii, and later designated as the type for Monard’s new genus. Monard’s creation of Syngastes in 1924 transferred several species from Tegastes into this genus, including Syngastes twynami (Thompson & Scott, 1903). Modern taxonomic databases (e.g., World Register of Marine Species (WoRMS)) recognize Syngastes as a valid genus and list its constituent species accordingly. In some cases, subsequent revisions have moved Syngastes species to other genera. For example, Syngastes chalmersi was subsequently reclassified and is now accepted as Parategastes chalmersi (originally Tegastes chalmersi Thompson & Scott, 1903). Ongoing studies of Tegastidae have even questioned the monophyly of Syngastes, given the diversity of forms among its members.

== Species ==
As catalogued by WoRMS, there are twenty-seven accepted species currently placed in Syngastes (retrieved 12 October 2025, see the full species list in the external database). Notable species include:

- Syngastes twynami – first described in 1903 (as Tegastes twynami) from pearl oyster beds off Ceylon (Sri Lanka). This species’ discovery in part prompted Monard to erect the new genus in 1924;
- Syngastes clausii – originally Amymone clausii (Thomson, 1883), now the type species of Syngastes;
- Syngastes dentipes – described from Western Australia, distinguished by an enlarged, tooth-bearing maxilliped claw;
- Syngastes imthurni and Syngastes donnani – described by Thompson & Scott (1903) alongside S. twynami, originally as Tegastes, later reassigned to Syngastes;
- Syngastes macrognathus – one of Monard’s original species (1924) from Banyuls-sur-Mer, France;
- Syngastes indicus – described by Sewell (1940) from India;
- Syngastes spinifer – described by Fiers (1983);
- Syngastes tanzaniae – described by Marcus (1977) from East Africa;
- Syngastes australiensis, S. gibbosus, S. foveatus, S. craterifer, etc. – a series of species described in the 1990s by Ilse Bartsch from Australian waters;
- Syngastes multicavus and Syngastes pseudofoveatus – new species described from South Korea in 2016;
- Syngastes acutus – a species described in 2023 (not yet reflected in all databases), indicating that species discoveries in this genus are ongoing.

Most Syngastes species are very small (on the order of ~0.5 mm in length as adults) and require microscopic examination for identification. Keys to species rely on fine morphological details of their appendages.

== Morphological characteristics ==
Syngastes copepods share the general morphology of Tegastidae: a compact, laterally flattened body with a hardened cuticle, often bearing reticulate or dotted surface patterns. The body segmentation includes a broad cephalothorax and a narrow posterior region; females carry egg clusters attached ventrally. Like other tegastids, Syngastes have disproportionately large first antennae (antennules) and strong mouthparts for grasping or scraping.

Many diagnostic features of the genus are based on limb segmentation and ornamentation. For example, females of some Syngastes species have reduced antennule segment counts (e.g., only 6 segments in S. twynami vs more in related genera). The maxilliped (a feeding appendage) is often highly modified - in S. twynami, it has a comb-like inner edge with a funnel-shaped, ciliated protrusion and a stout terminal claw. The fifth pair of legs (P5), which are rudimentary in many copepods, still protrude in Syngastes and can exhibit unique shapes or spines useful for species identification.

Overall, Syngastes species are recognized by the combination of tegastid family traits (compressed body, amphipod-like profile) and specific details like the setation (arrangement of setae) on the swimming legs, the segmentation of the antennae, and the structure of the male vs. female P5 appendages. There is considerable morphological diversity within the genus - so much that researchers have raised doubts about whether Syngastes as currently defined represents a single natural group. Differences in antennary exopod structure, shape of the first leg (P1) exopod, armature of legs P2–P4, and the male fifth legs have all been noted as varying widely among Syngastes congeners. This diversity suggests that future taxonomic revisions may split or reassign some species once more detailed phylogenetic analyses are done.

== Geographic distribution, habitat and behaviour ==
Syngastes has a broad geographical distribution in warm and temperate seas worldwide. Members of this genus have been recorded in the Indo-Pacific, Indian Ocean, and Atlantic/Mediterranean regions. Many species are described from the Indo-West Pacific: for example, S. twynami and S. indicus in the northern Indian Ocean (Sri Lanka and India), S. tanzaniae from East Africa (Tanzania), and several species from Australian coastal reefs (Western Australia and the Great Barrier Reef). In East and Southeast Asia, new Syngastes species have been found in South Korea and adjacent waters. The genus is also present in European waters: Monard’s S. macrognathus came from the Mediterranean Sea (off France), and Pesta (1932) described species like S. latus and S. gregoryi from the Adriatic Sea. This suggests Syngastes may occur in many shallow marine habitats from the tropics to subtropical regions.

In terms of habitat, Syngastes are typically benthic and associated with coastal substrates. They thrive in phytal habitats (areas with abundant plant or algal growth) such as seagrass meadows, macroalgal beds, and coral reefs. Within coral reef ecosystems, they may live among coral branches or rubble, benefiting from the complex structure. Some species tolerate brackish conditions: S. twynami has even been reported from a large estuarine lagoon (Chilika Lake, India), indicating an ability to survive in reduced salinities. Depth-wise, most records are from shallow waters (intertidal to a few tens of meters deep), where their algal and invertebrate hosts occur. For example, collections in Sri Lanka and India found Syngastes in shallow coastal lagoons and reef flats, and the Australian species were from nearshore coral reef environments. There are no known truly deep-sea Syngastes (unlike the related genus Smacigastes which inhabits hydrothermal vents), reinforcing that Syngastes is mainly a shallow-water, reef-associated group.

Behaviourally, Syngastes copepods use their powerful appendages to cling tightly to surfaces. The laterally compressed body allows them to wedge into narrow spaces on corals or algae, resisting water currents. They can crawl among rough surfaces using their hooked antennae and claws. When dislodged (e.g., by the washing of oysters or disturbance of coral), they will be present in the surrounding sediment or water. Some species might exhibit a degree of host specificity, found predominantly with certain corals or in particular regions of a host’s body (for example, around the base of coral polyps), but detailed host-specificity needs to be further investigated.
