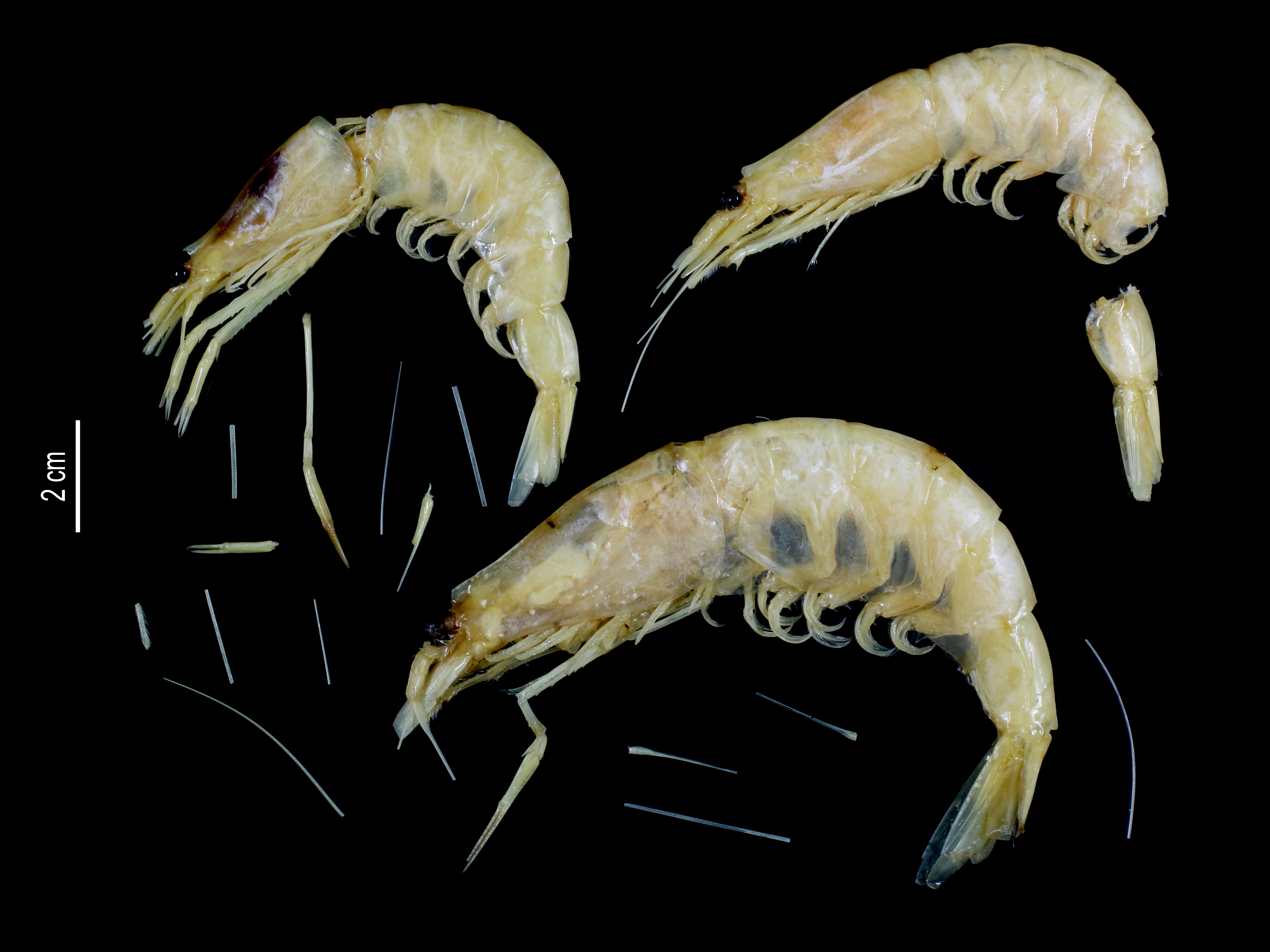
- Pasiphaea gelasinus

Scientific classification
- Kingdom: Animalia
- Phylum: Arthropoda
- Clade: Pancrustacea
- Class: Malacostraca
- Order: Decapoda
- Suborder: Pleocyemata
- Infraorder: Caridea
- Family: Pasiphaeidae
- Genus: Pasiphaea; Savigny, 1816

Synonyms
- Phye Wood-Mason, 1892

= Pasiphaea =

Genus of crustaceans

Pasiphaea is a genus of caridean (true) shrimp in the family Pasiphaeidae found from the Arctic to the Antarctic and living in the mesopelagic to bathypelagic zones. It contains the economically significant Japanese glass shrimp (P. japonica), which has been fished for over a century and a half.

== Taxonomy ==
The genus Pasiphaea was created in 1816 by M. J. C. Savigny to accommodate the species Alphaeus sivado, described the same year by Antoine Risso from a specimen from Nice. Numerous species were described in the genus in the 19th and 20th centuries, and by the end of the latter century, the taxonomic status of several species was quite muddled. Taxonomic work on the genus has been made difficult by numerous synonymies, names based on inadequate and brief original descriptions, and species separated by very minor morphological differences. In the 1990s, Ken-Ichi Hayashi revised several groups of species within the genus, and, notably, redefined the genus as a whole by considering the genus Phye as a synonym. Hayashi divided Pasiphaea into three informal groups, as well as a fourth category of over a dozen species of more miscellaneous physical characteristics. However, a 2026 study found that the morphology-based groups were quite at odds with molecular evidence collected, with the groups being scattered near-randomly across the genetic clades. New species were also added to the genus by Hayashi in the 1990s and 2000s and by authors working in the West Pacific region in 2012 and 2026. In particular, the 2026 paper – which revised the taxonomy of Pasiphaea in the southwest tropical Pacific Ocean as well – found that "even moderately abundant new collections can yield a significant number of undescribed Pasiphaea species", although some of those new species are represented by only a single specimen. The paper also found species in the New Caldeonia area that are very genetically distinct but are "nearly indistinguishable" based on morphological characteristics. The authors suggested that this may be the result of rapid speciation in the area caused by a rugged terrain divided by numerous seamounts and rises.

=== Species ===
The description of eight new species of Pasiphaea from the tropical Pacific in 2026 brought the total number of species up to The World Register of Marine Species lists the following taxa as of 2026:

- Pasiphaea acutifrons Spence Bate, 1888
- Pasiphaea aequus Komai, Lin & Chan, 2012
- Pasiphaea affinis Rathbun, 1902
- Pasiphaea alcocki (Wood-Mason in Wood-Mason & Alcock, 1891)
- Pasiphaea allainae Tikhomirov & Vereshchaka in Tikhomirov, Kulagin, Lunina, Vourey & Vereshchaka, 2026
- Pasiphaea americana Faxon, 1893
- Pasiphaea amplidens Spence Bate, 1888
- Pasiphaea antea Rodrigues, Alves-Junior & Cardoso, 2018
- Pasiphaea arabica Timofeev, 1997
- Pasiphaea barnardi Yaldwyn, 1971
- Pasiphaea burukovskyi Wasmer, 1993
- Pasiphaea chacei Yaldwyn, 1962
- Pasiphaea corteziana Rathbun, 1902
- Pasiphaea cristata Spence Bate, 1888
- Pasiphaea crosnieri Hayashi, 2004
- Pasiphaea debitusae Hayashi, 1999
- Pasiphaea diaphana Burukovsky & Romensky, 1980
- Pasiphaea dofleini Schmitt, 1932
- Pasiphaea dorsolineatus Komai & Chan, 2012
- Pasiphaea ecarina Crosnier, 1969
- Pasiphaea emarginata Rathbun, 1902
- Pasiphaea exilimanus Komai, Lin & Chan, 2012
- Pasiphaea falx Komai, Lin & Chan, 2012
- Pasiphaea faxoni Rathbun, 1904
- Pasiphaea flagellata Rathbun, 1906
- Pasiphaea fragilis Hayashi, 1999
- Pasiphaea gelasinus Hayashi & Yaldwyn, 1998
- Pasiphaea gracilis Hayashi, 1999
- Pasiphaea grandicula Burukovsky, 1976
- Pasiphaea hoplocerca Chace, 1940
- Pasiphaea japonica Omori, 1976
- Pasiphaea kaiwiensis Rathbun, 1906
- Pasiphaea kapala Kensley, Tranter & Griffin, 1987
- Pasiphaea komaii Tikhomirov & Vereshchaka in Tikhomirov, Kulagin, Lunina, Vourey & Vereshchaka, 2025
- Pasiphaea korzuni Burukovsky, 1995
- Pasiphaea laevis Hayashi, 1999
- Pasiphaea ledoyeri Hayashi, 2006
- Pasiphaea levicarinata Hanamura, 1994
- Pasiphaea liocerca Chace, 1940
- Pasiphaea longitaenia Kensley, Tranter & Griffin, 1987
- Pasiphaea machfulae Tikhomirov & Vereshchaka in Tikhomirov, Kulagin, Lunina, Vourey & Vereshchaka, 2026
- Pasiphaea magna Faxon, 1893
- Pasiphaea major Hayashi, 2006
- Pasiphaea marisrubri Iwasaki, 1989
- Pasiphaea mclaughlinae Hayashi, 2006
- Pasiphaea merriami Schmitt, 1931
- Pasiphaea multidentata Esmark, 1866
- Pasiphaea natalensis Burukovsky & Romensky, 1982
- Pasiphaea notosivado Yaldwyn, 1971
- Pasiphaea orientalis Schmitt, 1931
- Pasiphaea oshoroae Komai & Amaoka, 1993
- Pasiphaea pacifica Rathbun, 1902
- Pasiphaea philippinensis Hayashi, 1999
- Pasiphaea planidorsalis Hayashi, 2004
- Pasiphaea poeyi Chace, 1939
- Pasiphaea portalae Tikhomirov & Vereshchaka in Tikhomirov, Kulagin, Lunina, Vourey & Vereshchaka, 2025
- Pasiphaea princeps Smith, 1884
- Pasiphaea propinqua De Man, 1916
- Pasiphaea pseudacantha Hayashi, 2004
- Pasiphaea rathbunae (Stebbing, 1914)
- Pasiphaea romenskyi Burukovsky, 1995
- Pasiphaea scotiae (Stebbing, 1914)
- Pasiphaea semispinosa Holthuis, 1951
- Pasiphaea sinensis Hayashi & Miyake, 1971
- Pasiphaea sirenkoi Burukovsky, 1987
- Pasiphaea sivado (Risso, 1816)
- Pasiphaea taiwanica Komai, Lin & Chan, 2012
- Pasiphaea tarda Krøyer, 1845
- Pasiphaea telacantha Hayashi, 2004
- Pasiphaea timofeevi Burukovsky, 1993
- Pasiphaea tinyamchani Tikhomirov & Vereshchaka in Tikhomirov, Kulagin, Lunina, Vourey & Vereshchaka, 2026
- Pasiphaea tokalaui Tikhomirov & Vereshchaka in Tikhomirov, Kulagin, Lunina, Vourey & Vereshchaka, 2026
- Pasiphaea truncata Rathbun, 1906
- Pasiphaea unispinosa Wood-Mason, 1892
- Pasiphaea voureyae Tikhomirov & Vereshchaka in Tikhomirov, Kulagin, Lunina, Vourey & Vereshchaka, 2026
- Pasiphaea westindica Tchesunov, 1984
- Pasiphaea wirotaroenoae Tikhomirov & Vereshchaka in Tikhomirov, Kulagin, Lunina, Vourey & Vereshchaka, 2026
