= Robertgurneya =

Scientific classification
- Kingdom: Animalia
- Phylum: Arthropoda
- Class: Copepoda
- Order: Harpacticoida
- Family: Miraciidae
- Subfamily: Diosaccinae
- Genus: Robertgurneya; Apostolov & Marinov, 1988

Synonyms
- Robertgurneya Lang, 1944

Genus of crustaceans

Robertgurneya is a genus of copepods, containing the following species:

- Robertgurneya arabica (Noodt, 1964)
- Robertgurneya brevipes Wells & Rao, 1987
- Robertgurneya dactylifer (C. B. Wilson, 1931)
- Robertgurneya dictydiophora (Monard, 1928)
- Robertgurneya diversa Lang, 1965
- Robertgurneya ecaudata (Monard, 1936)
- Robertgurneya erythraea (A. Scott, 1902)
- Robertgurneya falklandiensis (Lang, 1936)
- Robertgurneya hopkinsi Lang, 1965
- Robertgurneya ilievecensis (Monard, 1935)
- Robertgurneya intermedia Bozic, 1955
- Robertgurneya oligochaeta Noodt, 1955
- Robertgurneya remanei Klie, 1950
- Robertgurneya rostrata (Gurney, 1927)
- Robertgurneya simulans (Norman & T. Scott, 1905)
- Robertgurneya smithi Hamond, 1973
- Robertgurneya soyeri Apostolov, 1974
- Robertgurneya spinulosa (G. O. Sars, 1911)
- Robertgurneya tenax (Brian, 1927)

== Taxonomic history ==
The genus Robertgurneya was first diagnosed by Karl Georg Herman Lang in 1944, with the name commemorating Robert Gurney. Since Lang did not designate a type species, as required by the International Code of Zoological Nomenclature for generic names published since 1930, that name is not "available". The first authors to explicitly designate a type species were Apostolov & Marinov in 1988, and they are therefore considered the authors of the genus.
