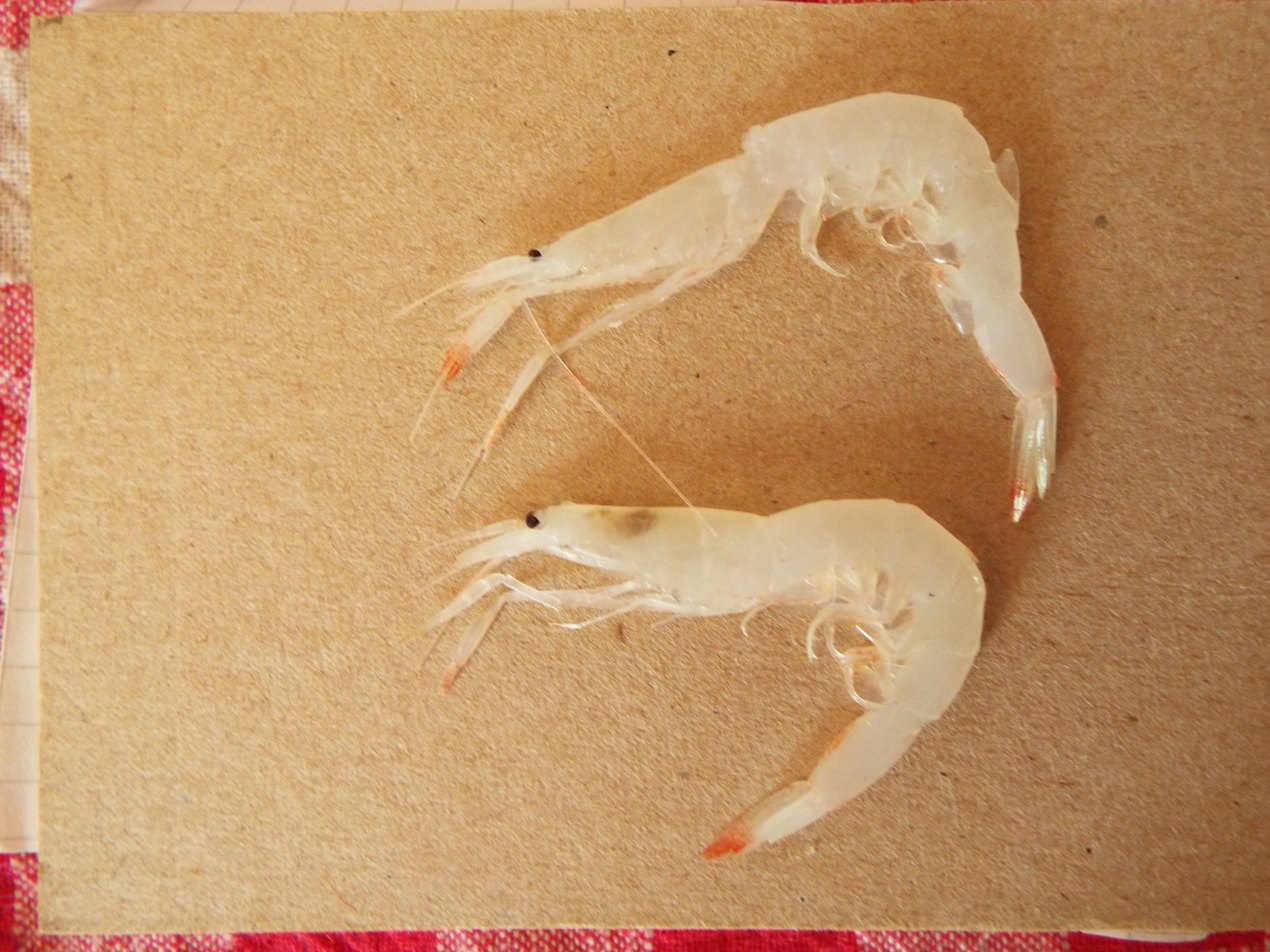
- Pasiphaea sivado

Scientific classification
- Kingdom: Animalia
- Phylum: Arthropoda
- Clade: Pancrustacea
- Class: Malacostraca
- Order: Decapoda
- Suborder: Pleocyemata
- Infraorder: Caridea
- Superfamily: Pasiphaeoidea; Dana, 1852
- Family: Pasiphaeidae; Dana, 1852

Genera
- See text

= Pasiphaeidae =

Family of crustaceans

Pasiphaeidae is a family of shrimp. It is the only family in the superfamily Pasiphaeoidea and contains seven extant genera:

- Alainopasiphaea Hayashi, 1999
- Eupasiphae Wood-Mason, 1893
- Glyphus Filhol, 1884
- Leptochela Stimpson, 1860
- Parapasiphae Smith, 1884
- Pasiphaea Savigny, 1816
- Psathyrocaris Wood-Mason, 1893

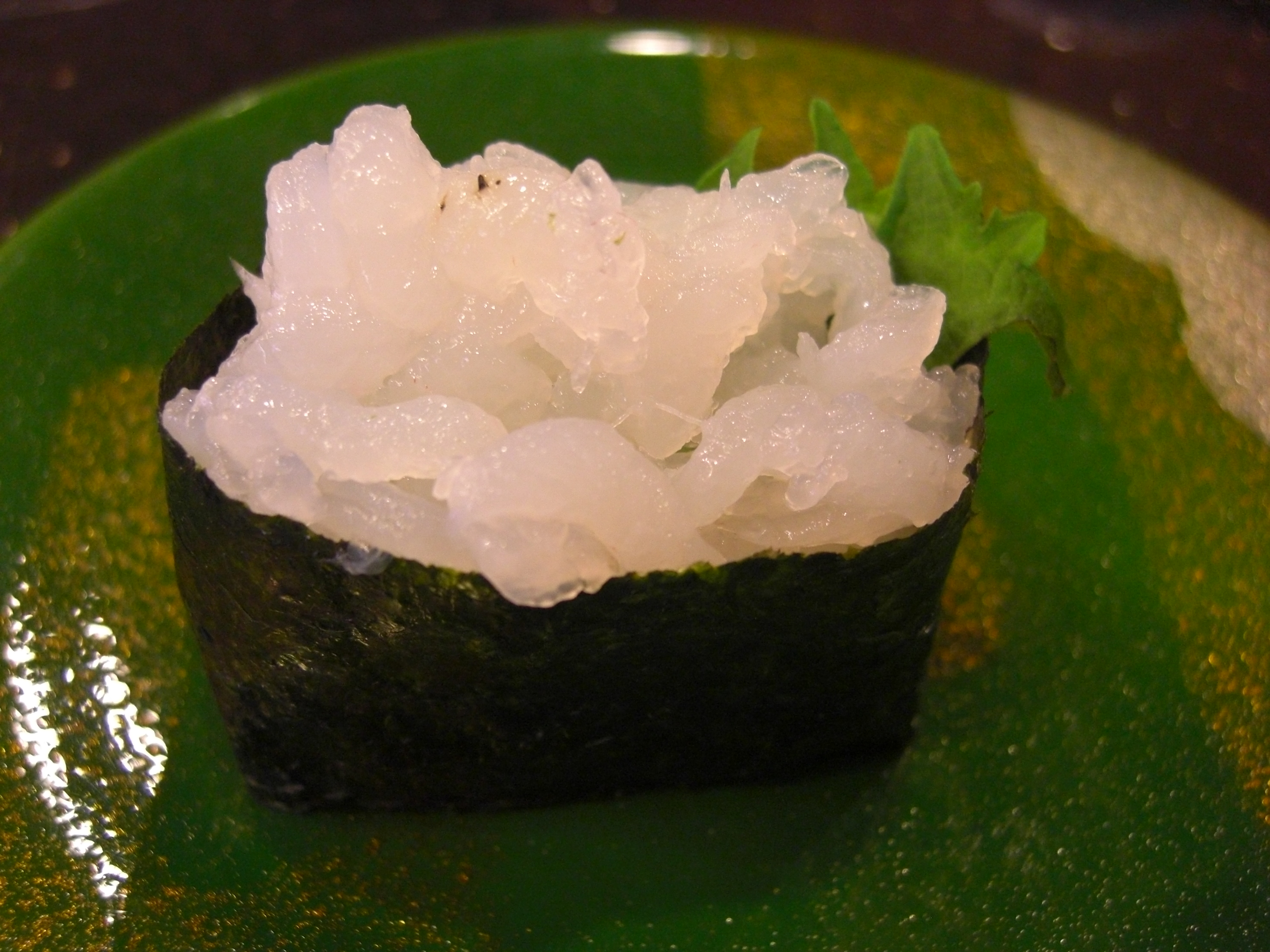
Pasiphaea japonica (shiroebi) as sushi
