= Miraciidae =

Scientific classification
- Kingdom: Animalia
- Phylum: Arthropoda
- Clade: Pancrustacea
- Class: Copepoda
- Order: Harpacticoida
- Family: Miraciidae; Dana, 1846

Subfamilies
- See text

Synonyms
- Diosaccidae Sars G.O., 1906

Family of crustacean

Miraciidae is a family of copepods in the family Miraciidae.

== Subdivisions ==
The World Register of Marine Species lists the following genera as accepted within Miraciidae, subdivided into three subfamilies.

- Diosaccinae Sars G.O., 1906
  - Actopsyllus Wells, 1967
  - Amonardia Lang, 1944
  - Amphiascoides Nicholls, 1941
  - Amphiascus Sars G.O., 1905
  - Antiboreodiosaccus Lang, 1944
  - Balucopsylla Rao, 1972
  - Bulbamphiascus Lang, 1944
  - Dactylopodamphiascopsis Lang, 1944
  - Diosaccopsis Brian, 1925
  - Diosaccus Boeck, 1873
  - Eoschizopera Wells & Rao, 1976
  - Goffinella Wilson C.B., 1932
  - Haloschizopera Lang, 1944
  - Helmutkunzia Wells & Rao, 1976
  - Ialysus Brian, 1927
  - Metamphiascopsis Lang, 1944
  - Miscegenus Wells, Hicks & Coull, 1982
  - Monardius Huys, 2009
  - Neomiscegenus Karanovic & Ranga Reddy, 2004
  - Paramphiascella Lang, 1944
  - Paramphiascoides Wells, 1967
  - Pararobertsonia Lang, 1944
  - Parialysus Nicholls, 1941
  - Pholenota Vervoort, 1964
  - Protopsammotopa Geddes, 1968
  - Psammotopa Pennak, 1942
  - Pseudamphiascopsis Lang, 1944
  - Pseudodiosaccopsis Lang, 1944
  - Pseudodiosaccus Scott T., 1906
  - Rhyncholagena Lang, 1944
  - Robertgurneya Apostolov & Marinov, 1988
  - Robertgurneyella Gómez, 2020
  - Robertsonia Brady, 1880
  - Sarsamphiascus Huys, 2009
  - Schizopera Sars G.O., 1905
  - Schizoperoides Por, 1968
  - Tydemanella Scott A., 1909
  - Typhlamphiascus Lang, 1944
- Miraciinae Dana, 1846
  - Distioculus Huys & Böttger-Schnack, 1994
  - Macrosetella Scott A., 1909
  - Miracia Dana, 1846
  - Oculosetella Dahl F., 1895
- Stenheliinae Brady, 1880
  - Anisostenhelia Mu & Huys, 2002
  - Beatricella Scott T., 1905
  - Delavalia Brady, 1868
  - Itostenhelia Karanovic & Kim K., 2014
  - Lonchoeidestenhelia Gómez, 2020
  - Melima Por, 1964
  - Muohuysia Özdikmen, 2009
  - Onychostenhelia Itô Tat, 1979
  - Pseudostenhelia Wells, 1967
  - Stenhelia Boeck, 1865
  - Wellstenhelia Karanovic & Kim K., 2014
  - Willenstenhelia Karanovic & Kim K., 2014
- Unplaced genera
  - Amphiascopsis Gurney, 1927
