= Robert Gurney =

British zoologist

- Born: 31 July 1879
- Died: 5 March 1950
- Education: University of Oxford
- Spouse(s): Gamzu Gurney, née Garstang
- Scientific career
- Fields: Zoology, particularly crustaceans

Robert Gurney (31 July 1879 – 5 March 1950) was a British zoologist from the Gurney family, most famous for his monographs on British Freshwater Copepoda (1931–1933) and the Larvae of Decapod Crustacea (1942). He was not affiliated with any institution, but worked at home, initially in Norfolk, and later near Oxford. He travelled to North Africa and Bermuda, and received material from other foreign expeditions, including the Terra Nova Expedition (1910–1913) and the Discovery Investigations of the 1920s and 1930s.

== Biography ==
Robert Gurney was born in 1879 as the fourth son of John Gurney (1845–1887) and Isabel Charlotte Gurney (later Baroness Talbot de Malahide) of Sprowston Hall, Norfolk. He went to school at Eton College, and went on to study at New College, Oxford, graduating with first class honours in 1902. He was awarded a D.Sc. by the University of Oxford in 1927. He was never associated with any institution, but worked from his home, initially near Stalham, Norfolk, but from 1928 at Boars Hill, outside Oxford. He became a lifelong friend of Walter Garstang after the two men met while Garstang was running Easter Classes at Plymouth, which Gurney was attending as an undergraduate. Gurney went on to marry Garstang's sister, Gamzu (1878–1972). Later, Garstang's daughter married Alister Hardy, strengthening Gurney's connections with zoology.

Robert and Gamzu had one child, Oliver Gurney (1911–2001), who became a leading Assyriologist and Hittitologist.

== Scientific work ==
Gurney's first scientific work was a paper on metamorphosis in the crab Corystes cassivelaunus, which he published in 1902 while still an undergraduate at the University of Oxford. Two more papers on decapods appeared in 1903, and 1904 saw his first paper on freshwater copepods. Realising the need for a specialist field station for freshwater biology to match the marine biological stations at Plymouth (Marine Biological Association) and Naples (Stazione Zoologica), Robert and his brother Eustace (later Lord Mayor of Norwich) set up Great Britain's first freshwater laboratory at Sutton Broad. This station did not survive the First World War, but Gurney was later among the founders of the Freshwater Biological Association, which set up the field station on Windermere.

Gurney's two great study objects were the Copepoda and the larvae of Decapoda, and his greatest works were the three-volume monograph British Freshwater Copepoda, published by the Ray Society in 1931–1933, and his Larvae of Decapod Crustacea published by the Ray Society in 1942. Perhaps through the influence of Garstang, Gurney rejected Ernst Haeckel's biogenetic law (that "ontogeny recapitulates phylogeny"), preferring Garstang's concept of paedomorphosis as an explanation for the similarities between copepods and decapod larvae. Gurney was, however, very tentative in his speculations.

== Expeditions ==
Gurney took part in several expeditions, including one to North Africa in 1906, and the Cambridge University Suez Expedition in 1924. He also worked on material collected by other expeditions, including the Terra Nova Expedition (1910–1913), the Discovery Investigations (1920s and 1930s) and the Great Barrier Reef Expedition of 1928–1929. Gurney returned to the Red Sea, visiting the marine laboratory at Hurghada in 1936, and visited Bermuda twice: once with Walter Garstang in 1935, and once with both Garstang and Marie V. Lebour in 1938.

== Honours ==
A number of organisms are named in honour of Robert Gurney:

- Robertgurneya Lang, 1948 (Copepoda: Diosaccidae)
- Tisbe gurneyi (Lang, 1934) (Copepoda: Tisbidae)
- Leptocaris gurneyi (Nicholls, 1944) (Copepoda: Darcythompsoniidae)
- Harpacticus gurneyi Jakubisiak, 1933 (Copepoda Harpactidae)
- Kelleria gurneyi Sewell, 1949 (Copepoda: Kelleriidae)
- Diarthrodes gurneyi Lang, 1948 (Copepoda: Thalestridae)
- Nikoides gurneyi Hayashi, 1975 (Decapoda: Processidae)
- Saccoglossus guerneyi (Robinson, 1927) (Hemichordata: Enteropneusta)
