= Robert Ievers =

British-Ceylonese public servant (1850–1905)

Robert Wilson Ievers (c. 1850 – 10 February 1905) CMG was a British-born Ceylonese public servant.

Robert Wilson Ievers was born in 1850, the third son of Robert John Ievers (1804–1873), a Limerick wine merchant and a descendant of the Ievers of Mount Ievers Court and Elizabeth née Browne, the third daughter of Major M. P. Browne, of Woodstock, County Mayo. His eldest brother, John Henry, served with the Royal Irish Constabulary and died in Australia in 1879. His other brother, David Butler, died an infant. His sister, Frances, married William Browning Gardner, a solicitor from Cork.

Ievers was educated at Queen's University, Belfast, he placed first in the Ceylon Civil Service examinations, entering the civil service in 1872. He travelled to Ceylon as part of the administration of Sir William Gregory, Governor of Ceylon, who resided at Coole Park, Galway. In 1878, a year after Gregory's departure from the colony, Ievers was appointed Assistant Government Agent in Kegalle. Over the next two decades his official positions included Assistant Colonial Secretary (1885), Government Agent for the North Central Province (1889), and Principal Assistant Colonial Secretary (1894). In 1886, he succeeded Sir William C. Twynam upon his retirement as the Government Agent of the Northern Province, serving until 1900. Ievers also served as acting Colonial Secretary from 10 November 1901 to 4 January 1902, and 25 April 1902 to 24 November 1902, in the absence of Everard im Thurn. After which he returned to his position as Government Agent of the Northern Province.

He married Catherine (Kate) Crawford (?–1931), the eldest daughter of Andrew Howard Crawford, the County Surveyor for the North Riding of County Tipperary. They had three daughters, Nena Beatrice Izat (b. 1883), Ethel Synge McClintock (b. 1885) who married Thomas Leopold McClintock Bunbury, (3rd Baron Rathdonnell) the Aide-de-camp to two Governors of Ceylon, Sir Henry Arthur Blake and Sir Henry Edward McCallum, from 1912 to 1914, and Kathleen George (b. 1886).

In 1902 he was appointed a Companion of the Order of St. Michael and St. George.

In 1903 a species of copepod, Lichomolgus ieversi, was named in Iever's honour.

Ievers died on 10 February 1905, at the age of 55. He is buried in St. Nicholas Collegiate Church, Galway, Ireland.

== Publications ==
- Ievers, Robert Wilson (1890). Letter from the Government Agent, Anurádhapura, on the subject of the restorations of the Abhayagiri and Mirisawẹṭiya Dágabas. Colombo: G. J. A. Skeen - Government Printer.
- Ievers, Robert Wilson (1899). "Journal of the Ceylon Branch of the Royal Asiatic Society of Great Britain and Ireland". Customs and Ceremonies connected with Paddy Cultivation. VI. Ceylon Branch of the Royal Asiatic Society: 46-52.
- Ievers, Robert Wilson (1899). "Journal of the Ceylon Branch of the Royal Asiatic Society of Great Britain and Ireland". Beligala. VII. Ceylon Branch of the Royal Asiatic Society: 440-461.
- Ievers, Robert Wilson (1899). "Journal of the Ceylon Branch of the Royal Asiatic Society of Great Britain and Ireland". The Custom of Polyandry in Ceylon. XVI. Ceylon Branch of the Royal Asiatic Society: 3-6.
- Ievers, Robert Wilson (1899). Manual of the North-Central Province. Colombo: G. J. A. Skeen - Government Printer.
