= Albert Monard =

Swiss zoologist (1886–1952)

- Born: 2 September 1886; Les Ponts-de-Martel, Switzerland
- Died: 27 September 1952 (aged 66); La Chaux-de-Fonds, Switzerland
- Known for: Expeditions in Africa; studies on deep-water fauna of Lake Neuchâtel; descriptions of new copepod species
- Scientific career
- Fields: Natural history, zoology, botany
- Workplaces: Museum of Natural History of La Chaux-de-Fonds

Albert Monard (2 September 1886 – 27 September 1952) was a Swiss naturalist and explorer.

== Biography ==
A doctor of science, Monard was a professor at the Gymnasium of La Chaux-de-Fonds (today the Lycée Blaise-Cendrars). He devoted his life to scientific research, publishing works on the deep-water fauna of Lake Neuchâtel, describing many new species of copepod crustaceans, and laying the foundations of a new classification of this group.

From 1921 to 1954 he served as curator of the Museum of Natural History of La Chaux-de-Fonds.

His passion for scientific expeditions led him four times to Africa, from where he brought back important collections, most of which were deposited in the Museum of Natural History of La Chaux-de-Fonds, but also in other institutions such as the museums of Fleurier, Neuchâtel, Bienne, Le Locle, Saint-Imier and Solothurn.

In 1919, he self-published a practical tool for studying flora, Le Petit botaniste romand, which continues to be used in schools in Romandy. In 1924, he established the harpacticoid copepod genus Syngastes.

At his death, Monard left behind a significant scientific legacy, consisting of more than sixty publications.

== Scientific expeditions ==
- 1928 – Angola
- 1932 – Angola
- 1935 – Tunisia
- 1936 – Algeria
- 1937 – Guinea-Bissau (then Portuguese Guinea)
- 1946–1947 – Cameroon

== Works ==
- Contribution à la mammologie d’Angola et prodrome d’une faune d’Angola, Lisbon, 1935
- La faune profonde du lac de Neuchâtel, Neuchâtel, 1919
- Le loup de Pouillerel, La Chaux-de-Fonds, 1945
- Le Petit botaniste romand, La Chaux-de-Fonds, 1919
- Voyage de la mission scientifique suisse en Angola, Neuchâtel, 1930
- Résultats de la Mission scientifique du Dr. Monard en Guinée Portugaise. 1937-1938, Lisbon, 1939-1940
- Résultats de la Mission zoologique suisse au Cameroun, Douala, 1951
