= Kennard (surname) =

Kennard is a surname. Notable people with the surname include:

- Beulah Elfreth Kennard (1869–1949), American educator and writer
- Bob Kennard, Welsh writer and agriculturist
- Caroline Kennard (1827–1907), naturalist and women's rights activist
- Clyde Kennard, American civil rights activist
- Coleridge Kennard (disambiguation)
- Devon Kennard, American football player
- Earle Hesse Kennard, physicist
- Francis J. Kennard, American architect
- Howard William Kennard (1878–1955), British diplomat
- Hugh Kennard, World War II RAF officer and post-war owner of a number of airlines
- John Kennard (disambiguation)
  - Jonathan Kennard, English racing driver
- Joyce Kennard (1941–2026), American judge from California
- Kyle Kennard (born 2001), American football player
- Luke Kennard (born 1996), American basketball player
- Luke Kennard (poet) (born 1981), British poet and critic
- Margaret Kennard, neurologist
- Martin P. Kennard (1818–1903), American abolitionist and businessman
- Matthew Kennard (disambiguation)
  - Matt Kennard (actor) (born 1982), English actor
  - Matt Kennard (journalist) (born 1983), English journalist
- Robert Kennard (1800–1870), English merchant, financier and entrepreneur
- Sean Kennard, Japanese‐American classical pianist
- William Kennard (born 1957), American diplomat

== See also ==
- Kennard baronets
- Justice Kennard (disambiguation)
- Kennard (disambiguation)
- Kinnard, surname
