= Kennard =

Kennard may refer to:

== Places ==
- Loch Kennard, a lake in Perth and Kinross, Scotland, UK
- Kennard, Indiana, US
- Kennard, Nebraska, US
- Kennard, Ohio, US
- Kennard, Texas, US

== People ==
- Kennard (surname)
- Kennard baronets, of Fernhill in Southampton, England, UK
- Justice Kennard (disambiguation)
- Kennard Backman (born 1993), U.S. American-football player
- Kennard Baker Bork (born 1940), U.S. professor of geology and geography
- Kennard F. Bubier (1902–1983), member of the Byrd Antarctic Expedition
- Kennard Cox (born 1985), U.S. American-football player
- Kennard Wedgwood (1873–1949), a chinaware heir
- Kennard Winchester (born 1966), U.S. basketball player
- Daniel Kennard Sadler (1882–1960), U.S. judge and lawyer

== Other uses ==
- Kennard Street Park, Cleveland, Ohio, USA
- Kennard Independent School District, Kennard, Texas, USA
- Kennard High School, Kennard, Texas, USA
- Kennard-Dale High School, Fawngrove, York County, Pennsylvania, USA
- Nelson-Reardon-Kennard House, Abingdon, Harford, Maryland, USA
- Thomas P. Kennard House, Lincoln, Nebraska, USA
- Kennards, a UK department store
- Kennards Hire, Australian equipment hire company
- Kennards Self Storage, Australian storage company

== See also ==
- Kennards House, Cornwall, England, UK
- Kennard School (disambiguation)
- Kennar (disambiguation) (disambiguation)
