= Keener =

Keener or Keeners may refer to:

== People ==
An English or Irish surname or an anglicized version of the German surname Kühner, which is derived from Kühn and the Old German kühn (keen). Alternate spellings include Khner, Kienar, Kinar, Kiener, Keene, Kunner, Kenner, Koener, Crossman and other variants.

- Brandon Keener (born 1974), American actor
- Catherine Keener (born 1959), American actress
- Craig S. Keener (born 1960), American professor at Asbury Theological Seminary
- Dean Keener (born 1965), men's basketball coach for the James Madison University Dukes
- Elmore Keener (1935–1973), co-owner of the Pittsburgh Penguins National Hockey League team
- Emily Keener (born 1998), American singer-songwriter
- Harry Keener (1871–1912), American baseball pitcher
- Hazel Keener (1904–1979), American film actress
- James Keener, American mathematician
- Jason LaRay Keener (born 1985), American filmmaker
- Jeff Keener (born 1959), American baseball relief pitcher
- Joe Keener (born 1953), American baseball pitcher
- John Christian Keener (1819–1906), American Methodist bishop
- Stephen Keener (1942–2022), voice actor on Transformers

== Places ==
- Keener, Alabama
- Keeners, Missouri
- Keener Cave, Missouri
- Keener, North Carolina
- Keener-Johnson Farm, historic house in Seymour, Tennessee
- Keener Township, Jasper County, Indiana

== Other uses ==
- Keener, professional mourner in Gaelic Irish tradition
- Keener, a primarily Canadian English term for an enthusiastic person

== See also ==
- Keening, lamenting as by a keener
- Keen (disambiguation)
- Kenner (disambiguation)
