= Coleridge Kennard =

Coleridge Kennard may refer to:

- Sir Coleridge Kennard, 1st Baronet (1885–1948), English aristocrat and diplomat
- Coleridge Kennard (politician) (1828–1890), British member of parliament for Salisbury
