= George Head Barclay =

British diplomat (1862–1921)

Sir George Barclay KCMG KCSI CVO
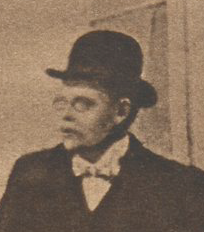
- as ambassador in Bucharest

British Ambassador to Iran
- In office 1908–1912
- Preceded by: Sir Cecil Spring Rice
- Succeeded by: Sir Walter Townley

Personal details
- Born: George Head Barclay; 23 March 1862 Walthamstow, Essex, England
- Died: 26 January 1921 (aged 58) London, England
- Spouse: Beatrix Chapman (m. 1891; div. 1919)
- Relations: Samuel Gurney (grandfather); Charles T. Barclay (brother); Maurice de Bunsen (cousin); John Gurney (cousin)
- Children: Dorothy Katherine Barclay
- Education: Eton College; Trinity College, Cambridge
- Occupation: Diplomat

Sir George Head Barclay, KCMG, KCSI, CVO (23 March 1862 – 26 January 1921) was a British diplomat.

== Early life ==
Barclay was born on 23 March 1862 at Walthamstow, Essex, England. He was the son of Richenda Louisa (née Gurney) Barclay (1827–1888) and Henry Ford Barclay (1826–1891) of Monkhams, Woodford. Among his siblings was Edith Richenda Barclay (mother of Sir George Nevile Bland); Sarah Adelaide Barclay (who married her cousin, Charles Alfred Leatham; son of William Henry Leatham); Henry Ford Barclay Jr.; Maj. Cameron Barclay (who married Hon. Charlotte Horsley-Beresford, daughter of the 3rd Baron Decies; Marion Alice de Gournay Barclay (wife of Sir Lancelot Carnegie); Charles Theodore Barclay and Col. Hugh Gurney Barclay, MVO (who married Evelyn Louisa Hogg, daughter of Sir Stuart Saunders Hogg). His father was a Justice of the Peace and served as the High Sheriff of Essex in 1886.

His paternal grandparents were Ford Barclay and Esther (née Reynolds) Barclay. His maternal grandfather was Samuel Gurney of the Norwich Gurney family that established Gurney's Bank in 1770, which merged into Barclays in 1896. Among his maternal family was uncle Samuel Gurney (a member of parliament for Penryn & Falmouth); aunt Catherine Gurney, who was the wife of Sir Edward Buxton, 2nd Baronet (an MP for Essex South and East Norfolk); aunt Elizabeth Gurney, who was married to Ernest Christian Ludwig de Bunsen (an Anglo-German writer); and aunt Priscilla, who was married to William Henry Leatham (an MP for Wakefield and West Riding of Yorkshire South). His first cousin, Sir Maurice de Bunsen, 1st Baronet, was the British Ambassador to Spain and Austria. Through his uncle, the Rev. John Gurney, he was a first cousin of John Gurney, the mayor of Norwich who married Isabel Blake-Humfrey.

He was educated at Eton College and Trinity College, Cambridge.

== Career ==
On 24 July 1886, Barclay joined the Foreign Office and in 1888 became attaché in Washington, D.C., serving until 1891. In that year, he became Secretary of Legation in Rome and, between 1897 and 1898, was posted to Madrid.

He subsequently served as Second Secretary in Constantinople until August 1902, when he was posted as Secretary of Legation at Tokyo. He returned to the capital of the Ottoman Empire as His Majesty's Minister Plenipotentiary at Constantinople. From 1908 to 1912, he was Envoy Extraordinary and Minister Plenipotentiary to His Majesty the Shah of Persia in Tehran. In 1912, he was appointed Minister at Bucharest, the capital and largest city of Roumania. Barclay retired from the diplomatic service in 1920.

=== Honours ===
He was invested as a Companion of the Order of St Michael and St George in 1898. In 1906, he was made a Commander of the Royal Victorian Order. In 1913, Barclay was invested as a Knight Commander of the Orders of St Michael and St George, and of the Star of India.

== Personal life ==
In 1891, while secretary of the British Legation at Washington, Barclay was married to Beatrix Mary Jay Chapman (1864–1942) at the Jay Estate in Rye, New York. Beatrix, an American who had been painted by John Singer Sargent in c. 1881, was the daughter of Henry Grafton Chapman Jr., who served as President of the New York Stock Exchange, and the sister of noted writer John Jay Chapman. Her maternal grandfather was John Jay, the U.S. Minister to Austria-Hungary. Before their divorce in 1919, they were the parents of one child:

- Dorothy Katherine Barclay (c. 1890–1953), an author who became Lady Kennard after her marriage to Sir Coleridge Kennard, 1st Baronet, who was then Barclay's third secretary in Tehran, on 5 April 1911.

In May 1920, Beatrix remarried to Maj. Gen. Raymond de Candolle, CB, C.E., son of Casimir de Candolle. In 1921, she lived in Smyrna, Greece.

Barclay died in London on 26 January 1921.

=== Descendants ===
Through his daughter, he was the maternal grandfather of Sir Lawrence Kennard, 2nd Baronet and Sir George Kennard, 3rd Baronet.
