= Kinard =

Kinard may refer to:

== Places ==
- Kinard, Florida
- Kinards, South Carolina
- Kinard Middle School, a middle school in Fort Collins, Colorado
- Caledon, County Tyrone, historically known as Kinnaird, a village and townland in Northern Ireland

== People ==
- Chris Kinard, American badminton player
- Felim O'Neill of Kinard, Irish nobleman
- Frank Kinard, American football player
- J. Spencer Kinard, American journalist and singer
- John Kinard, American activist
- Terry Kinard, American football player

== See also ==
- Kinnard, surname
