= Kennard School =

Kennard School or Kennard Schools or variant, may refer to:

== Secondary schools ==
- Kennard High School, Kennard, Indiana, USA
- Kennard School, Queen Anne's County, Maryland, USA; predecessor to the Queen Anne's County High School
- Kennard-Dale High School, Fawngrove, York County, Pennsylvania, USA
- Kennard High School, Kennard, Texas, USA

== Primary schools ==
- Kennard Elementary School, Queen Anne's County, Maryland, USA; see Queen Anne's County High School

== Other ==
- Kennard Independent School District, Kennard, Texas, USA

== See also ==
- Kennard (disambiguation)
