= Lewis E. Jenks =

American silversmith (1840–1888)

- Born: Lewis Edwin Jenks; August 23, 1840; Pawtucket, Rhode Island, U.S.
- Died: August 8, 1888 (aged 47); Boston, Massachusetts, U.S.
- Resting place: Mount Hope Cemetery, Boston, Massachusetts, U.S.
- Occupation: Silversmith
- Spouse: Phoebe Ann Pickering Hoyt (m. 1863)
- Children: 2, including Barton

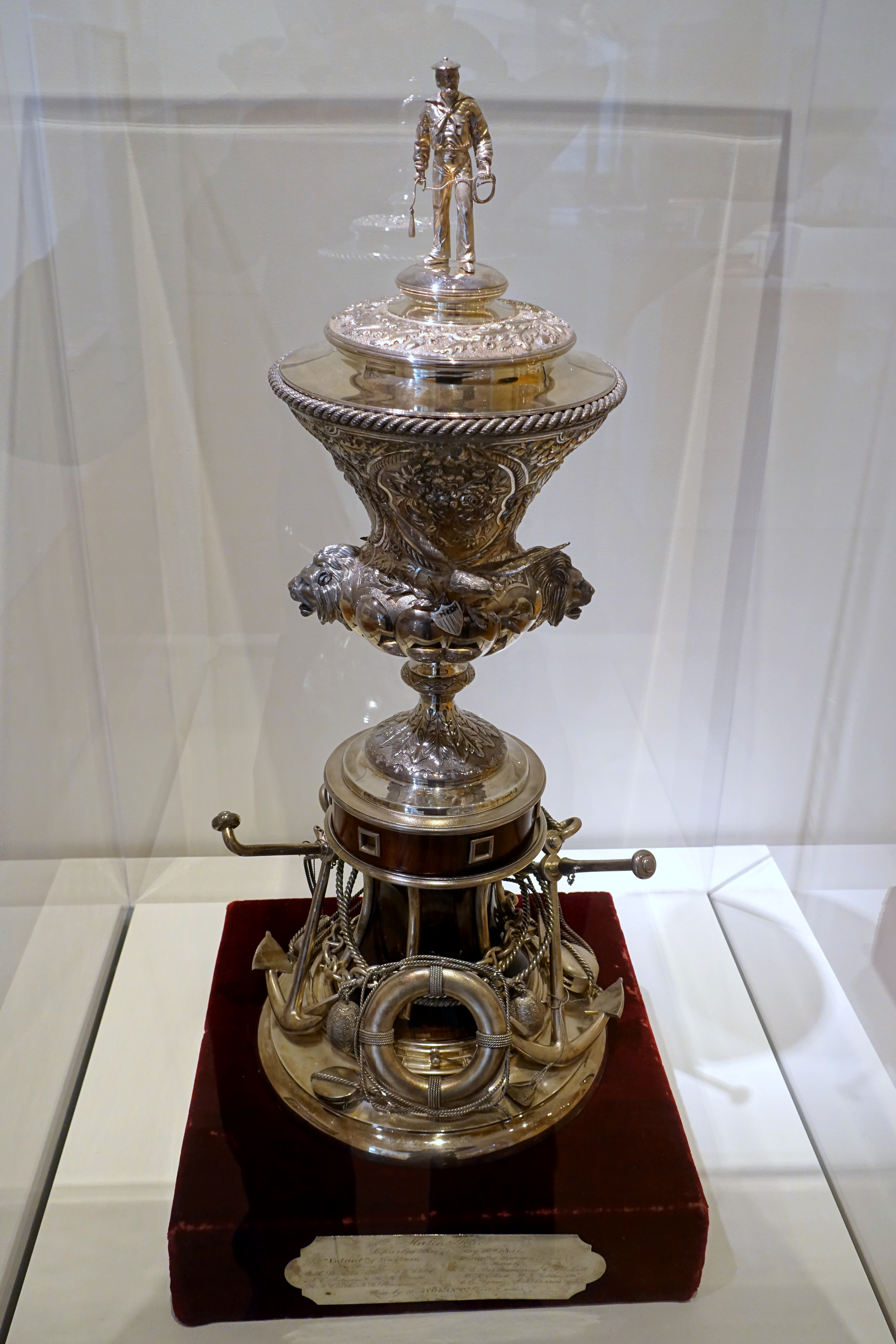
Arthur H. Clark trophy by Lewis E. Jenks, Boston, c. 1875

Lewis Edwin Jenks (August 23, 1840 – August 8, 1888) was an American silversmith, active in Boston.

Jenks was born in Pawtucket, Rhode Island, to George Almond Jenks, and Phebe (Clapp) Jenks. He married Phoebe Ann Pickering Hoyt on November 10, 1863, in Boston, worked at the Boston firm of Bigelow Bros. & Kennard, went into business on his own around 1872, and was a partner from 1876 to 1880 with Edward Parry Kennard in Boston as Kennard & Jenks at 576 Washington Street. The partners manufactured fine quality sterling flatware, probably retailed by Bigelow, Kennard & Co.; in 1880 their firm was purchased by the Gorham Manufacturing Company and relocated to Providence, Rhode Island. His son, Barton Pickering Jenks (1870–1941), later carried on the family business as Goodnow & Jenks, creators of colonial revival silver and the leading Boston silversmiths of the 1890s. In this role, he took on George Christian Gebelein as an apprentice. The elder Jenks died in Boston and was buried at Mount Hope Cemetery in Mattapan, Massachusetts.

== See also ==
- Martin P. Kennard
