= Gebelein (disambiguation) =

Gebelein may refer to:

- Gebelein, town in Egypt

== People ==
- George Christian Gebelein (1878–1945), American silversmith
- Richard S. Gebelein (1946–2021), American politician and judge
