= East Hopewell Township, Pennsylvania =

Township in Pennsylvania, US

Coordinates: 39°48′00″N 76°29′58″W

- Township
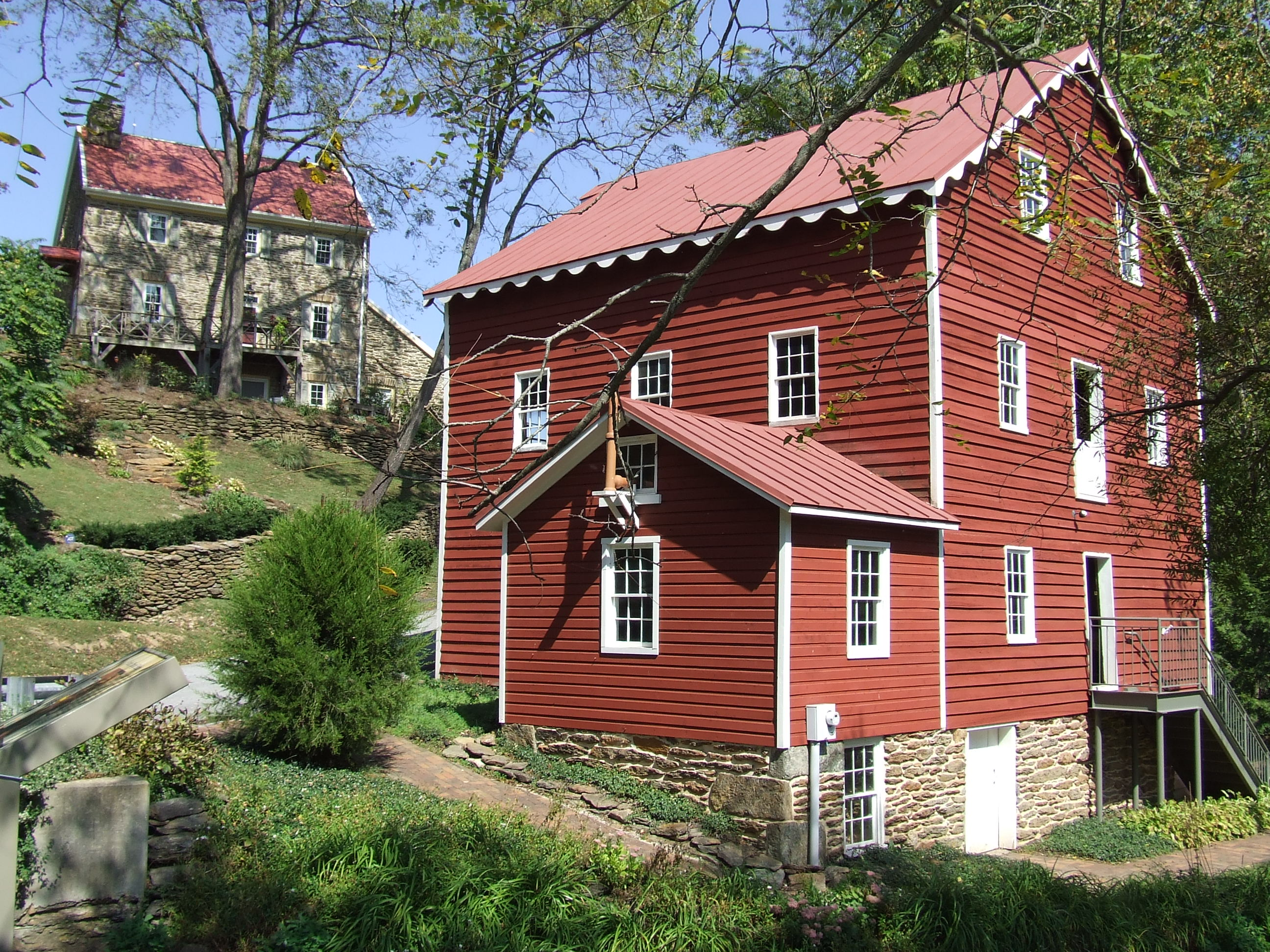
- The Wallace-Cross Mill and miller's house

- Seal

- Location in York County and the state of Pennsylvania.
- Country: United States
- State: Pennsylvania
- County: York
- Settled: 1734
- Incorporated: 1885

Government
  - Type: Board of Supervisors

Area
  - Total: 20.56 sq mi (53.25 km^{2})
  - Land: 20.56 sq mi (53.25 km^{2})
  - Water: 0 sq mi (0.00 km^{2})

Population (2020)
  - Total: 2,418 ▲
  - Estimate (2023): 2,472
  - Density: 118.7/sq mi (45.84/km^{2})
- Time zone: UTC-5 (Eastern (EST))
  - Summer (DST): UTC-4 (EDT)
- Area code: 717
- FIPS code: 42-133-21296
- Website: https://www.easthopewelltownshippa.gov/

Historical population
Census	Pop.	Note	%±
1890	1,234		—
1900	1,074		−13.0%
1910	961		−10.5%
1920	824		−14.3%
1930	763		−7.4%
1940	813		6.6%
1950	807		−0.7%
1960	784		−2.9%
1970	843		7.5%
1980	1,450		72.0%
1990	1,929		33.0%
2000	2,209		14.5%
2010	2,416		9.4%
2020	2,418		0.1%
2023 (est.)	2,472		2.2%
U.S. Decennial Census

East Hopewell Township is a township in York County, Pennsylvania, United States. The population was 2,418 at the 2020 census. It is served by the South Eastern School District which provides a public education.

== History ==
Muddy Creek Forks Historic District and the Wallace-Cross Mill are listed on the National Register of Historic Places.

== Geography ==
According to the United States Census Bureau, the township has a total area of 20.5 square miles (53 km^{2}), all land. East Hopewell Township surrounds on three sides the borough of Cross Roads, located along the township's northwestern border.

== Demographics ==
As of the census of 2000, there were 2,209 people, 769 households, and 642 families living in the township. The population density was 107.5 inhabitants per square mile (41.5/km^{2}). There were 800 housing units at an average density of 38.9 units per square mile (15.0 units/km^{2}). The racial makeup of the township was 98.60% White, 0.27% African American, 0.59% Asian, 0.05% from other races, and 0.50% from two or more races. Hispanic or Latino of any race were 0.45% of the population.

There were 769 households, out of which 38.5% had children under the age of 18 living with them, 75.4% were married couples living together, 4.4% had a female householder with no husband present, and 16.4% were non-families. 11.4% of all households were made up of individuals, and 3.1% had someone living alone who was 65 years of age or older. The average household size was 2.87 and the average family size was 3.13.

In the township the population was spread out, with 26.7% under the age of 18, 6.7% from 18 to 24, 31.0% from 25 to 44, 28.8% from 45 to 64, and 6.8% who were 65 years of age or older. The median age was 38 years. For every 100 females there were 103.4 males. For every 100 females age 18 and over, there were 104.4 males.

The median income for a household in the township was $58,194, and the median income for a family was $61,734. Males had a median income of $42,006 versus $30,417 for females. The per capita income for the township was $21,540. About 2.2% of families and 3.4% of the population were below the poverty line, including 2.8% of those under age 18 and 4.1% of those age 65 or over.
