= South Eastern School District =

School district in Pennsylvania

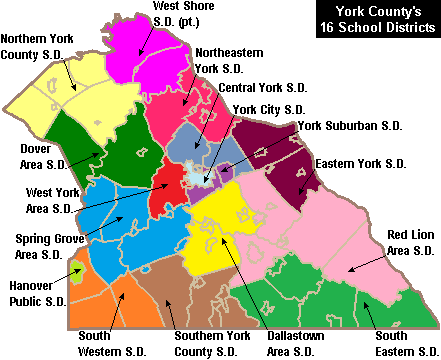

Address
- 377 Main Street Fawn Grove, Pennsylvania, 17321; United States

District information
- Type: Public

Other information
- Website: sesdweb.net

The South Eastern School District is a midsized, rural, public school district in southern York County, Pennsylvania. It serves the boroughs of Cross Roads, Stewartstown, Delta, and Fawn Grove, plus the townships of Hopewell Township, East Hopewell Township, Fawn Township, and Peach Bottom Township. It also includes the villages of Bryansville and Woodbine. The district encompasses approximately 105 square miles (270 km^{2}). According to data from the 2000 federal census, it serves a resident population of 17,884 people. By 2010, South Eastern School District's population increased to 19,567 people. In 2009, the district residents’ per capita income was $20,060, while the median family income was $55,846. In the Commonwealth, the median family income was $49,501 and the United States median family income was $49,445, in 2010.

== Schools ==
- Delta-Peach Bottom Elementary School
- Fawn Area Elementary School
- Stewartstown Elementary School
- South Eastern Middle School - West
- South Eastern Middle School - East
- Kennard-Dale High School

== Extracurriculars ==
The district's students have access to a wide variety of clubs, activities and an extensive sports program.

=== Sports ===
The District funds:

Boys

- Baseball - AAA
- Basketball- AAA
- Cross Country - AA
- Football - AAA
- Golf - AAA
- Lacrosse - AAAA
- Soccer - AA
- Track and Field - AAA
- Volleyball - AA
- Wrestling - AAA

Girls

- Basketball - AAA
- Cross Country - AA
- Field Hockey - AA
- Golf - AAA
- Lacrosse - AAAA
- Soccer (Fall) - AA
- Softball - AAA
- Girls' Tennis - AAA
- Track and Field - AAA
- Volleyball - AA

Middle School Sports

Boys

- Basketball
- Football
- Track and Field
- Wrestling

Girls

- Basketball
- Field Hockey
- Volleyball
- Track and Field

According to PIAA directory July 2012
