= John Kennard =

John Kennard may refer to:

- John Kennard (co-driver) (born 1959), rally co-driver from New Zealand
- John Kennard (cricketer) (1884–1949), English first-class cricketer
- John H. Kennard (1836–1887), Louisiana Supreme Court justice

== See also ==
- Jonathan Kennard (born 1985), British racecar driver
- Kennard (surname)
