= Fawn Township, Pennsylvania =

Fawn Township is the name of some places in the U.S. state of Pennsylvania:

- Fawn Township, Allegheny County, Pennsylvania
- Fawn Township, York County, Pennsylvania
