= Kentner =

Kentner is a surname. Notable people with the surname include:

- Bernice Kentner (1929–2018), American cosmetologist, author, and color theorist
- Louis Kentner (1905–1987), Hungarian-born British pianist

== See also ==
- Kenner (surname)
- Kentner Stadium
