= Barton Pickering Jenks =

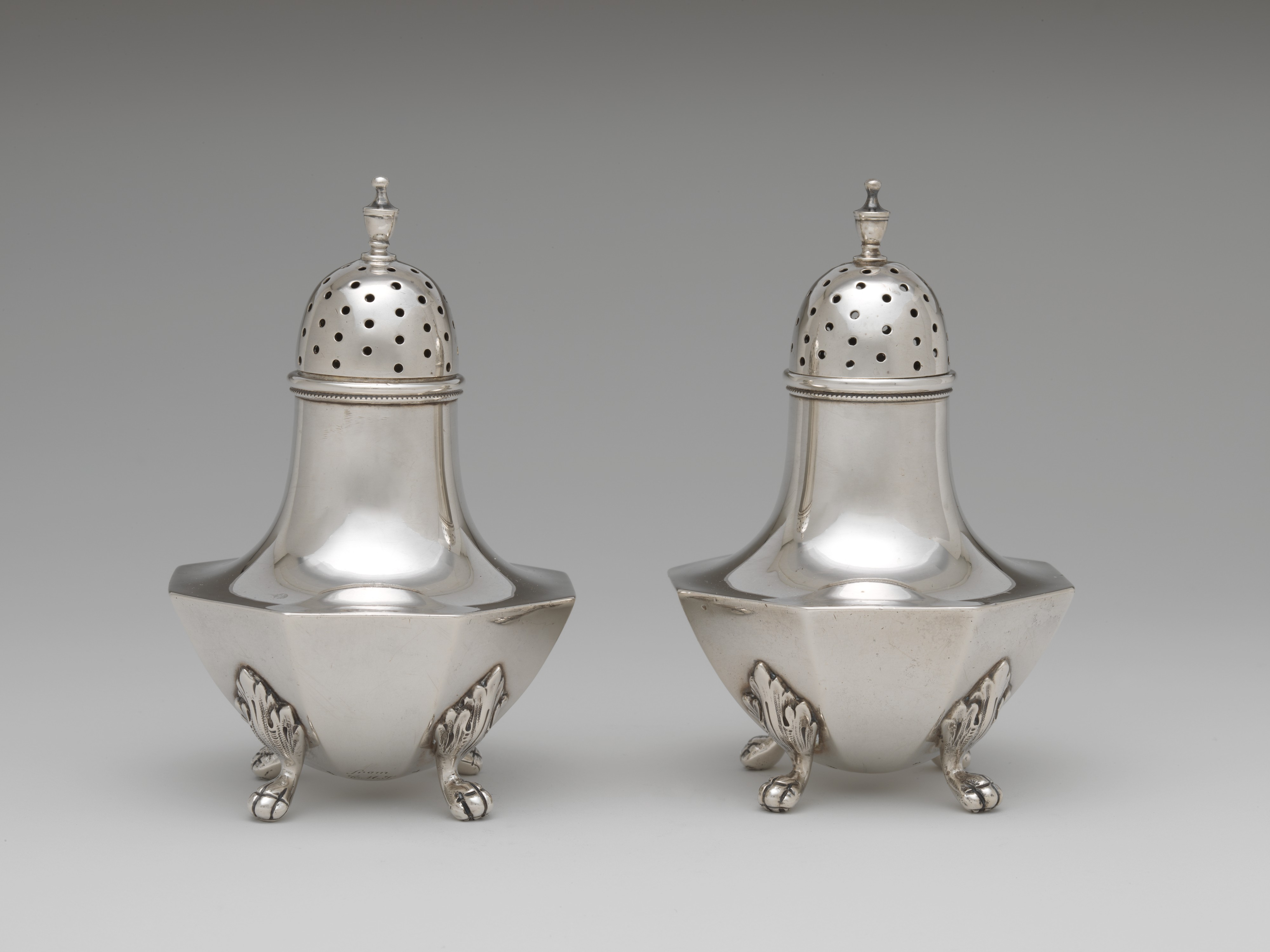
Casters by Goodnow & Jenks, circa 1900

Barton Pickering Jenks (July 21, 1870 – January 13, 1941) was a noted American silversmith, active in Boston.

Jenks was the son of Lewis E. Jenks and Phoebe Ann Pickering (Hoyt) Jenks. In 1893 he organized the firm Goodnow & Jenks where he served as designer. When Phoebe Jenks died in January 1907, her will was disallowed. The estate, including their residence at 290 Marlborough Street in Boston, was inherited by Barton Jenks as their only child. At that time, he was president and General Manager of William B. Durgin Company, manufacturers of silverware, and lived in Concord, New Hampshire, with his wife, Agnes Marie (O’Leary) Jenks. He later became Vice President of Gorham Manufacturing Company, of Providence, Rhode Island, after their acquisition of Durgin. He also served on the board of director of the Silversmiths' Company, of New York. Noted silversmith George Christian Gebelein, one of his apprentices, later wrote of him: "The man in charge was a typical Bostonian, qualified to accept only the best work from his fellow silversmiths." He died in Providence, Rhode Island, and is buried in Mount Hope Cemetery in Boston.

His work is collected in the Metropolitan Museum of Art.
