= Justice Kennard =

Justice Kennard or Judge Kennard, may refer to:

- John H. Kennard (1836–1887), associate justice of the Louisiana Supreme Court
- Joyce L. Kennard (born 1941), associate justice of the Supreme Court of California

== See also ==
- Daniel Kennard Sadler (1882–1960), U.S. judge and lawyer
- Kennard (surname)
- Kennard (disambiguation)
