= Kinnard =

Kinnard is a surname. Notable people with the surname include:

- Claiborne H. Kinnard Jr. (1912–1966), military officer
- Darian Kinnard (born 1999), American football player
- George L. Kinnard (1803–1836), politician
- Harry Kinnard (1915–2009), military officer
- Ralph Kinnard, filmmaker
- Rupert Kinnard (born 1954), cartoonist
- Wendy Kinnard (born 1959), politician
- William N. Kinnard (1926–2001), real estate educators

== See also ==
- Kinard (disambiguation) § People
- Kinnaird (disambiguation)
- Kennard (surname)
