= Matt Kennard =

Matt Kennard may refer to:

- Matt Kennard (actor) (born 1982 in Grimsby, England, UK, as Matthew Kennard), English television actor
- Matt Kennard (journalist) (born 1983 in London, England, UK, as Matthew Kennard), English author and journalist

== See also ==
- Kennard (surname)
