= Walter Beaupré Townley =

British diplomat (1863–1945)

Sir Walter Beaupré Townley KCMG
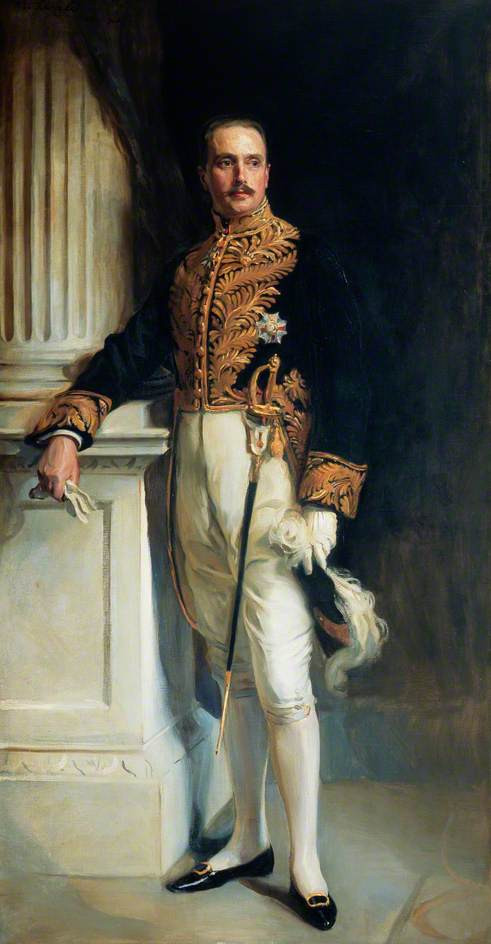
- Townley, dressed in diplomatic uniform for the coronation of George V, 1911
- Born: January 8, 1863
- Died: May 5, 1945 (aged 82)
- Occupations: Diplomat, Ambassador
- Known for: served at Paris, Tehran, Bucharest, Lisbon, Berlin, Rome, Beijing, Constantinople and Washington, D.C.

Sir Walter Beaupré Townley KCMG (8 January 1863 – 5 April 1945) was a British diplomat, who most notably served as the British Ambassador to the Netherlands during the final years of the First World War.

== Career ==
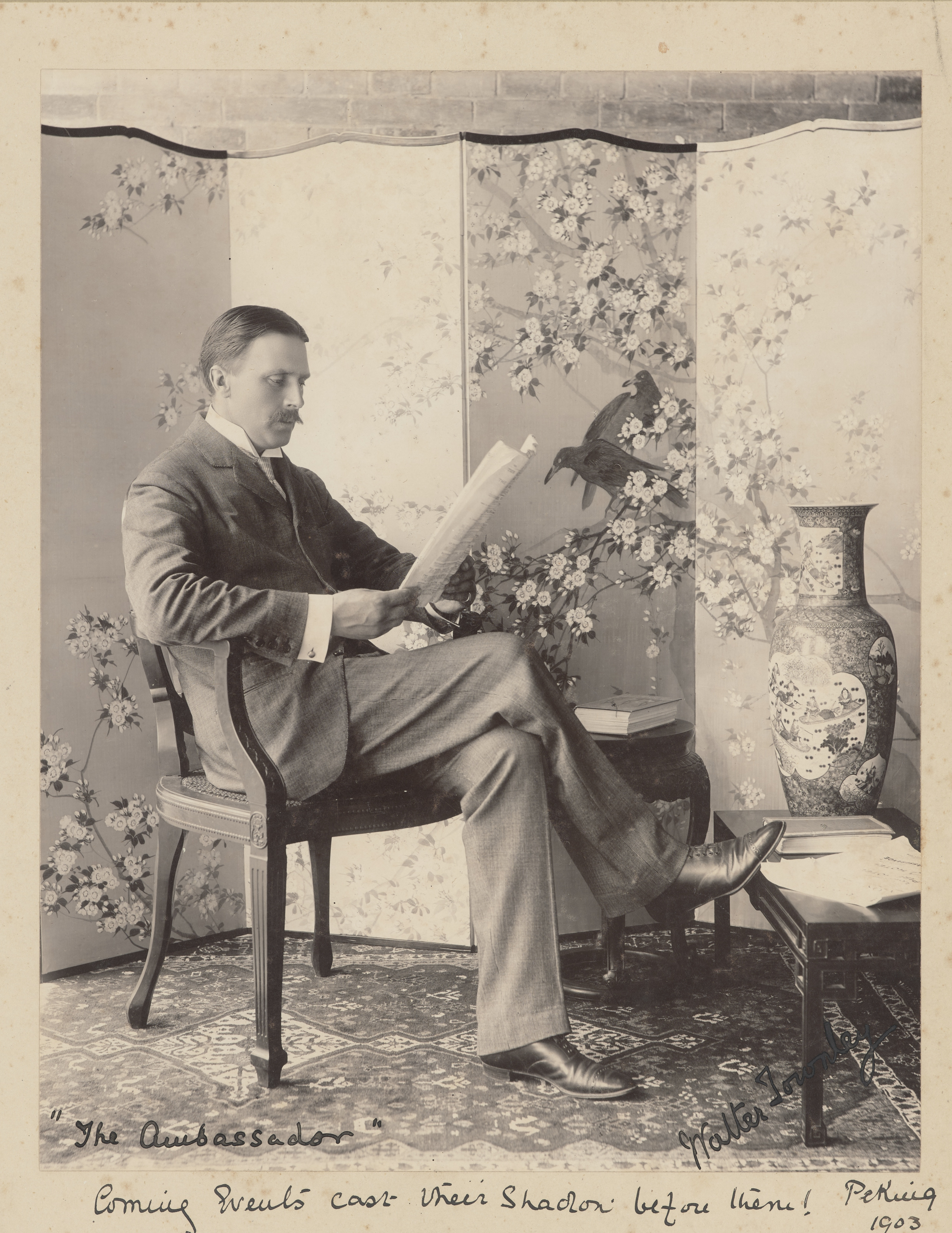
Walter Townley, Peking, 1903

Townley (of the Townley of Dutton family) was educated at Eton College. He entered the Foreign Office in 1885 and served at Paris, Tehran, Bucharest, Lisbon, Berlin, Rome, Peking, Constantinople and Washington, D.C. He was Minister to Argentina and concurrently to Paraguay 1906–10, Minister to Romania 1911–12, Minister to Persia 1912–15 and Minister to the Netherlands 1917–1919. During his time in the Netherlands he had to engage in long negotiations on the fate of the exiled German Emperor, who arrived in November 1918. In Townley's obituary The Times said:

The friendly relations between Holland and England during the last two years of the 1914–18 war were due to him. He and Lady Susan Townley had also made the Legation an attractive centre for the large British colony, official and other, that congregated in Holland during the last war.

Townley resigned in January 1919 but was asked to stay on until August of that year. After retiring he was chairman of the Anglo-Batavian Society.

Townley was knighted KCMG in the 1911 Coronation Honours.

== Lady Susan Townley ==
In 1896 Walter Townley married Lady Susan Keppel, daughter of William Keppel, 7th Earl of Albemarle. She published My Chinese note book (Methuen, London, 1904) and a volume of reminiscences,'Indiscretions' of Lady Susan (Thornton Butterworth, London, 1922). After her death in 1953, The Times said:

The fourth daughter of the seventh Earl of Albemarle, she came of a family with a record of public service since the days of William of Orange. Widely travelled even before her marriage in 1896, she was an ideal partner for her husband in his career in Lisbon, Berlin, Rome, Peking, Constantinople, South America, Persia, Belgium, and finally Holland, the home of her ancestors. She had that best of all conversational gifts, that of stimulating conversation in others, and she had a long and accurate memory, as her delightful volume of reminiscences proves. These, though published over 30 years ago, are still very well worth reading for the picture they give of the life of a bygone era, not only in this country but in, for instance, China, which in the days recalled by Lady Susan was still dominated by the Dowager Empress.

Note: Lady Susan had higher precedence as the daughter of an earl than as the wife of a knight. Therefore, after her husband was knighted, she was still known as Lady Susan Townley rather than as Lady Townley.

Diplomatic posts
Preceded by William Haggard	Envoy Extraordinary and Minister Plenipotentiary to the Argentine Republic; 1906–1910	Succeeded by Sir Reginald Tower
Preceded by William Haggard	Minister Plenipotentiary to the Republic of Paraguay; 1906–1910	Succeeded by Sir Reginald Tower
Preceded by Conyngham Greene	Envoy Extraordinary and Minister Plenipotentiary at the Court of His Majesty the King of Romania; 1911–1912	Succeeded by Sir George Barclay
Preceded by Sir George Barclay	Envoy Extraordinary and Minister Plenipotentiary to His Imperial Majesty the Shah of Persia; 1912–1915	Succeeded by Sir Charles Marling
Preceded by Sir Alan Johnstone	Envoy Extraordinary and Minister Plenipotentiary to Her Majesty the Queen of the Netherlands; 1917–1919	Succeeded by Sir Ronald Graham
