= Payne's Folly =

Historic house in Pennsylvania, United States

- U.S. National Register of Historic Places
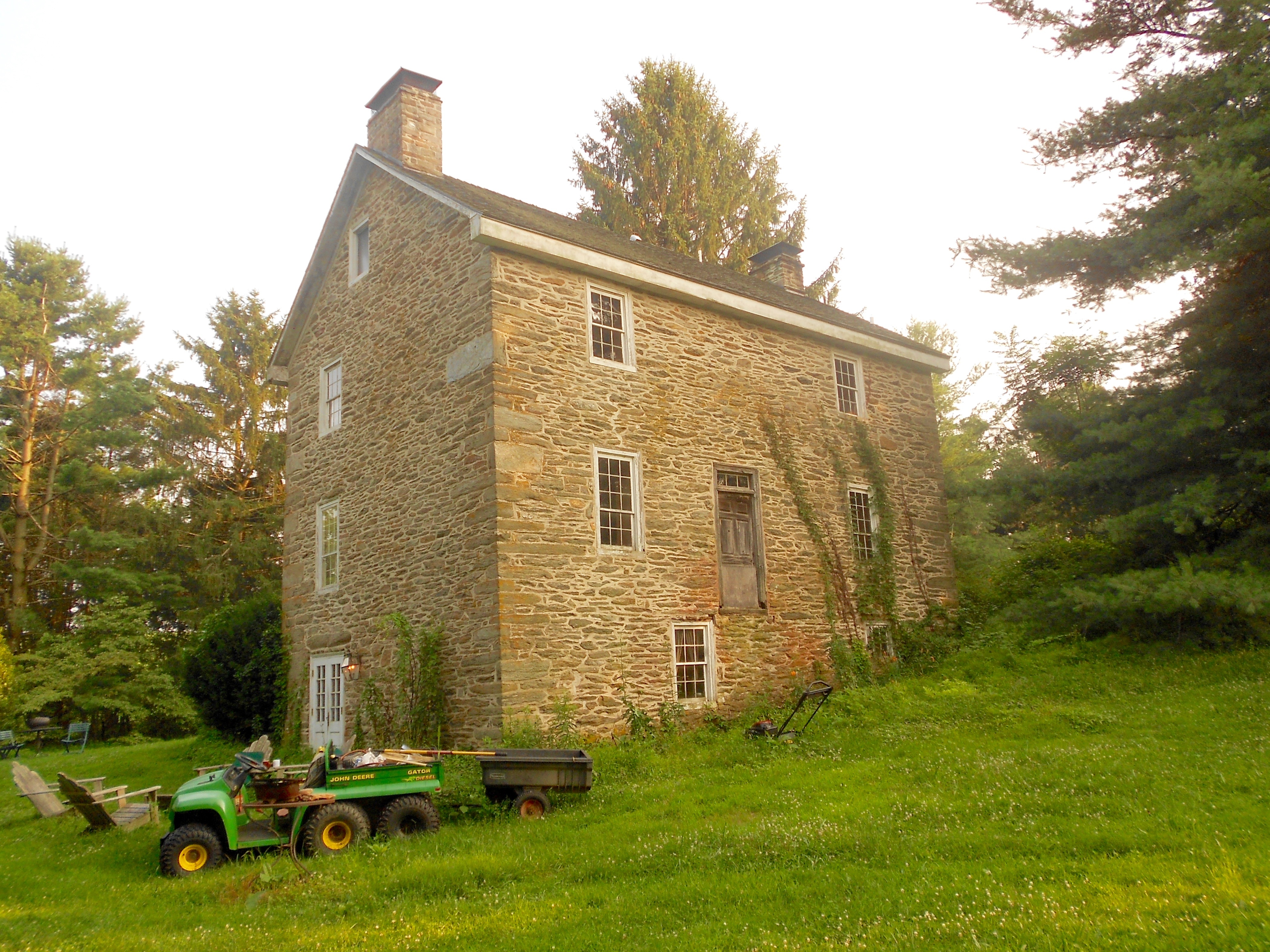

- Location within Pennsylvania Location within the United States
- Location: Watters Rd., Fawn Township, Pennsylvania
- Coordinates: 39°43′32″N 76°30′6″W
- Area: 2.2 acres (0.89 ha)
- Built: c. 1750
- Architectural style: Georgian, Germanic house
- NRHP reference No.: 86000422
- Added to NRHP: March 6, 1986

Payne's Folly is a historic home located at Fawn Township, York County, Pennsylvania. It was built about 1750, and is a 2 1/2-story, four bay by two bay stone early Germanic dwelling. It measures 36 feet by 24 feet and has a full basement and steep gable roof. It is built into a hillside.

It was added to the National Register of Historic Places in 1986.
