= Wallace-Cross Mill =

- U.S. National Register of Historic Places
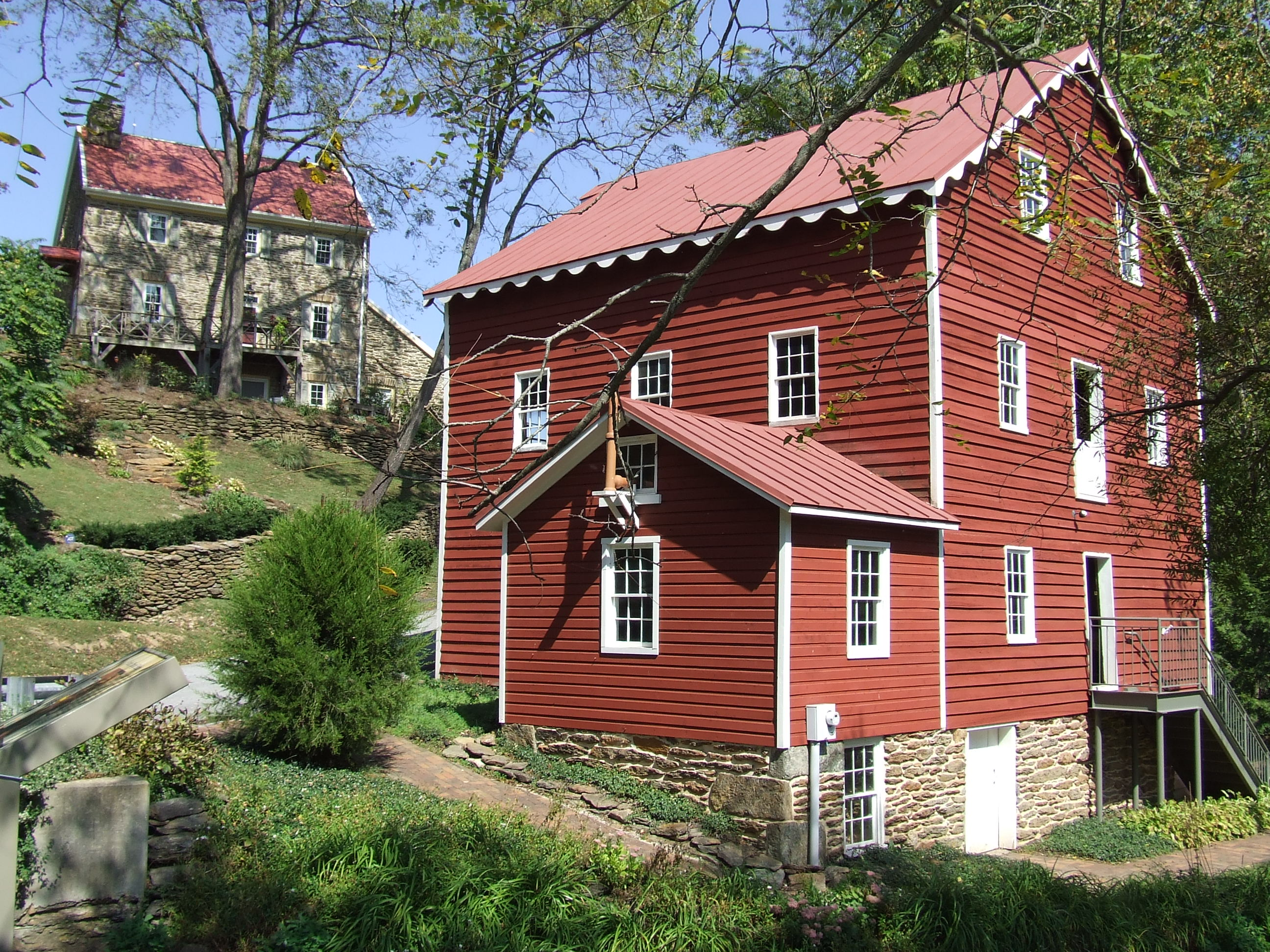
- Wallace-Cross Mill with miller's house in background

- Location within Pennsylvania Location within the United States
- Location: South of Felton, East Hopewell Township, Pennsylvania
- Coordinates: 39°47′58″N 76°32′27″W
- Area: 0.5 acres (0.20 ha)
- Built: 1826
- Built by: Wallace, Alexander
- NRHP reference No.: 77001204
- Added to NRHP: December 22, 1977

Wallace-Cross Mill is a historic grist mill located at East Hopewell Township, York County, Pennsylvania. It was built in 1826, and is a 2 1/2-story, frame building on a stone foundation. It has a gable roof with decorative bargeboard. It has an 11 feet in diameter, 4 feet wide, steel water wheel to run the machinery. The mill was given to York County by its owner in 1979.

It was added to the National Register of Historic Places in 1977.

== History ==
The mill was constructed in 1826 and was operated continuously until the 1980s taking its water power from Rambo Run. The mill now a part of the York County Parks system was placed on the Pennsylvania Inventory of Historic Places on February 24, 1977 and the National Register of Historic Places on June 10, 1977. The owner Harry Cross gave the mill to the County of York in 1979. A major renovation of the building, both inside and out, was undertaken by York County Parks in the early 2000s.

Since 1840, ownership of the mill changed only four times with one name change from the family name of Wallace to Cross.

The restoration focus is the 1950 era; the pinnacle of Harry Cross' career when the mill ran 24 hours a day and seven days a week. All three floors of the mill are open to the public with milling displays and equipment. The exhibits and demonstrations appeal to all ages but especially fifth through seventh grade students of Pennsylvania history.

Milling equipment includes a Lieberknecht mill and a hand-powered corn sheller. Also, there is a display on how millstones function and are sharpen. A family-tree display of the Wallace and Cross family can be found in the office.

The first floor office where Harry Cross conducted his business gives the impression that he stepped out for a moment. It includes a stove, miller's desk, work bench and chairs.

The mill was originally powered by a wooden overshot wheel with wooden spokes and shaft. In 1922, the wooden wheel was replaced by a steel Fitz wheel, manufactured in Hanover, Pennsylvania. Fitz was the preeminent manufacturer of mill wheels in the 19th century. The original Fitz waterwheel was restored and re-installed through the kindness of Harvey Bradley.

Since 2003, the mill has been operated by the Friends of Wallace-Cross Mill. This dedicated group of volunteers host open houses June through October and conducts special tours.
