= Kennar =

Kennar may refer to

- Kennar Valley in Antarctica
- El Kennar Nouchfi, a town and commune in Algeria
- Kennar Lewis (born 1991), Jamaican cricketer
- Richard Kennar (born 1994), Samoan rugby league footballer

== See also ==
- Kennard (disambiguation)
- Kenner (disambiguation)
