= Stephen baronets of De Vere Gardens (1891) =

Stephen baronets
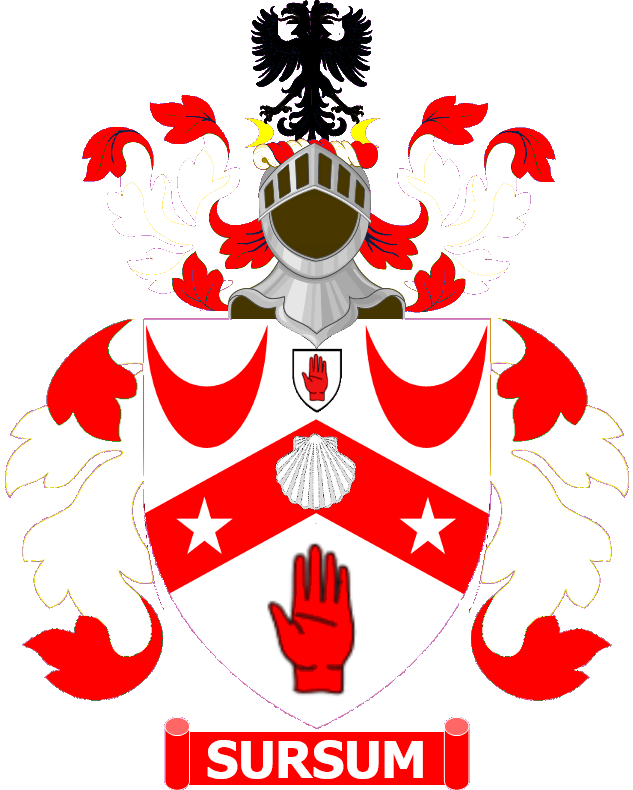
- Coat of arms of the Stephen baronets of De Vere Gardens
- Creation date: 1891
- Status: extinct
- Extinction date: 1987
- Motto: Sursum, upward
- Arms: Argent on a chevron between two crescents in chief and a sinister hand couped at the wrist in base Gules an escallop between two mullets of the first
- Crest: An eagle displayed with two heads Sable resting the dexter claw on an increscent and the sinister on a decrescent both Or

The Stephen baronetcy, of De Vere Gardens in the parish of St Mary Abbott, Kensington, in the County of London, was created in the Baronetage of the United Kingdom on 29 June 1891 for Sir James Stephen, a judge of the High Court of Justice.

The title became extinct on the death of the 4th Baronet in 1987, leaving no heir.

== Stephen baronets, of De Vere Gardens (1891) ==
- Sir James Fitzjames Stephen, 1st Baronet (1829–1894)
- Sir Herbert Stephen, 2nd Baronet (1857–1932)
- Sir Harry Lushington Stephen, 3rd Baronet (1860–1945)
- Sir James Alexander Stephen, 4th Baronet (1908–1987), certified insane 1945, discharged from hospital 1972. He left no heir.

== Notes ==
Baronetage of the United Kingdom
Preceded by Kennard baronets	Stephen baronets of De Vere Gardens; 29 June 1891	Succeeded by Savory baronets
