= Margaret Kennard =

American neuropsychologist (1899-1975)

Margaret A. Kennard
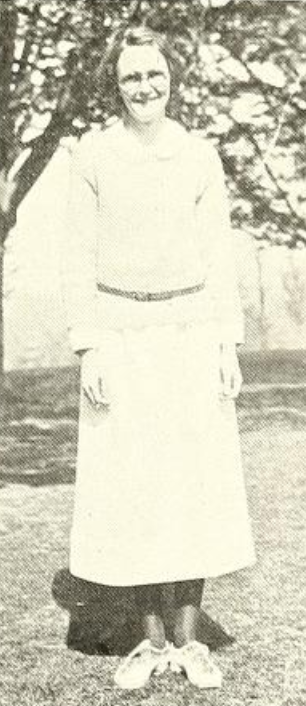
- Margaret Kennard, from the 1922 Bryn Mawr College yearbook
- Born: Margaret Alice Kennard; September 25, 1899; Brookline, Massachusetts
- Died: December 12, 1975 (aged 76)
- Education: Bryn Mawr, Cornell, Yale

Margaret Alice Kennard (September 25, 1899—December 12, 1975) was a neurologist who principally studied the effects of neurological damage on primates. Her work led to the creation of the Kennard Principle, which posits a negative linear relationship between age of a brain lesion and the outcome expectancy: in other words, that the earlier in life a brain lesion occurs, the more likely it is for some compensation mechanism to reverse at least some of the lesion's bad effects.

== Biography ==
Kennard's father was a notable landscape architect and naturalist; her paternal grandparents were the businessman and abolitionist Martin Kennard and the naturalist and women's rights activist Caroline Smith Kennard. Kennard graduated from Bryn Mawr College in 1922. She earned a Rockefeller Traveling Fellowship for study in Western Europe from 1934 to 1936. She also studied the effects of stimulants and cortical depressants on monkeys with brain damage.

== Kennard Principle ==
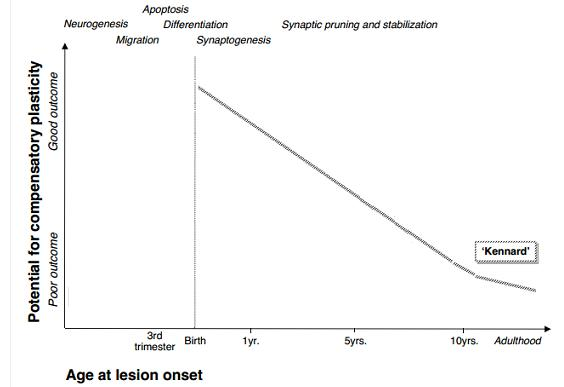
Graphical representation of the Kennard Principle

The observation that young brains reorganize more effectively than adult brains was first articulated by Kennard in 1936. Consequently, the notion that how well a brain can reorganize itself after damage as a function of the developmental stage is now known as the "Kennard principle". This research led to one of the earliest experimental evidence for age effects on neuroplasticity.

She worked closely with John Fulton in her famous infant brain studies.
