= Phoebe A. Jenks =

American portrait painter (1847–1907)

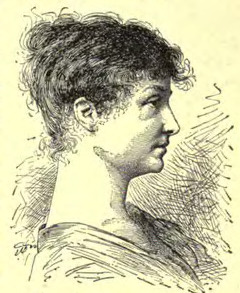
- Born: July 28, 1847; Portsmouth
- Died: January 20, 1907 (aged 59); Boston
- Occupation: Painter
- Spouse(s): Lewis E. Jenks
- Children: Barton Pickering Jenks

Phoebe Ann Pickering Hoyt Jenks (July 28, 1847 – January 20, 1907) was an American portrait painter.

Phoebe A. Jenks was born on July 28, 1847 in Portsmouth, New Hampshire, the daughter of Dennis Hoyt and Fidelia Barton Hoyt. In 1860 she married Boston silversmith Lewis E. Jenks.

Jenks began painting at age 29 and studied under Benjamin Curtis Porter and D. T. Kendrick. She became a portrait painter in Boston, specializing in portraits of women and children.

Phoebe A. Jenks died on 20 January 1907 in Boston.
