= Henry Grafton Chapman Jr. =

American banker (1833–1883)

President of the New York Stock Exchange
- In office 1873–1874
- Preceded by: Edward King
- Succeeded by: George H. Brodhead

Personal details
- Born: 1833 Boston, Massachusetts, U.S.
- Died: March 14, 1883 (aged 49–50) Manila, Philippines
- Spouse: Eleanor Kingsland Jay (m. 1858)
- Children: 4, including John Jay Chapman
- Parent(s): Henry Grafton Chapman Sr. Maria Weston Chapman

Henry Grafton Chapman Jr. (1833 – March 14, 1883) was an American banker who served as the president of the New York Stock Exchange.

== Early life ==
Chapman was born in Boston, Massachusetts in 1833. He was one of four children born to Henry Grafton Chapman Sr. (1804–1842) and Maria Weston Chapman, one of the leading campaigners against slavery who worked with William Lloyd Garrison on The Liberator.

His maternal grandparents, Captain Warren Richard Weston and Anne (née Bates) Weston, were not wealthy, but were well connected and his mother spent several years of her youth living with family in England, where she received a robust education.

== Career ==
Chapman began his banking career with the banking house of Baring Brothers & Co., where his relative, Joshua Bates, the American international financier who divided his life between the United States and the United Kingdom, was senior partner. He later traveled to South America, China and other countries before coming to New York and becoming a member of the banking firm Ward, Campbell & Co., which was closely aligned with Baring Brothers.

He also was a member of the New York Stock Exchange, for which he served as president from 1873 to 1874, during the Panic of 1873, during which the Exchange closed for ten days starting on September 20, 1873.

In Spring 1882, after a severe illness, Ward, Campbell & Co. was dissolved, and Chapman was advised by his physicians to take a long sea voyage. He sailed from New York to Japan and then further east. The trip seemed to have "entirely restored his health" until he was stricken at Manila with a fever that caused his death.

== Personal life ==
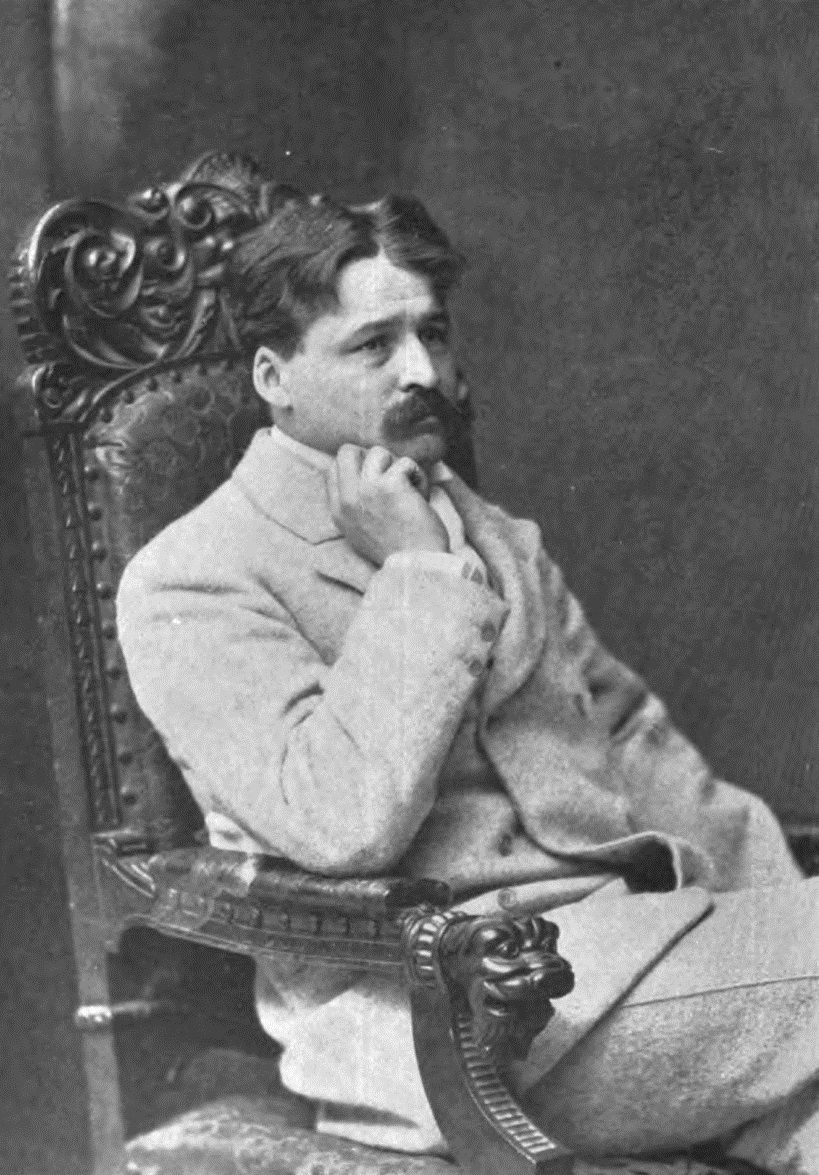
Photograph of his son, John Jay Chapman

In 1858, Chapman was married to Eleanor Kingsland Jay (1839–1921), the daughter of John Jay, the U.S. Minister to Austria-Hungary, and Eleanor Kingsland (née Field) Jay. She was the granddaughter of William Jay and a great-granddaughter of Chief Justice John Jay of the United States Supreme Court. They had four children:

- Henry Grafton Chapman III (1860–1913), a poet who married Frances deForest Perkins (1863-1929).
- John Jay Chapman (1862–1933), who married twice. His second wife was Elizabeth Astor Winthrop Chanler, second daughter of John Winthrop Chanler and Margaret Astor Ward of the Astor family.
- Eleanor Jay Chapman (1864–1929), who married real estate investor and society leader Richard Mortimer in 1886.
- Beatrix Chapman (1864–1942), who married British diplomat Sir George Head Barclay in 1891. They divorced, and in May 1920, she married Maj. Gen. Raymond de Candolle, C.B., C.E., son of Casimir de Candolle, and was painted by John Singer Sargent, c. 1881. In 1921, she lived in Smyrna, Greece.

He was a member of the Union Club of the City of New York, and "was very much liked in social as well as business circles. He was an accomplished linguist, having excellent command of several languages."

Chapman died in Manila, the capital of the Philippines, on March 14, 1883. He was buried at John Jay Cemetery in Rye, New York.

=== Descendants ===
Through his son John, he was the grandfather of four, including Victor Emmanuel Chapman (1890–1916), the first American aviator to die in France during World War I; John Jay Chapman Jr. (1893–1903), who died in youth; Conrad Chapman (1896–1989), who was engaged to marry Dorothy Daphne McBurney (1912–1997) in 1934, but who married Judith D. Kemp (1906–1999) in England in 1937; and Chanler Armstrong Chapman (1901–1982), who married Olivia James, a niece of Henry James. They divorced and he married the former Helen Riesenfeld, a writer, in 1948. After her death in 1970, he married Dr. Ida R. Holzbert Wagman in 1972.

Through his daughter, who was known as Lady Barclay, he was the grandfather of Dorothy Katherine Barclay, who became Lady Kennard after her marriage to Sir Coleridge Kennard, 1st Baronet.
