= Kenner (disambiguation) =

Kenner Products is a defunct American toy company now part of Hasbro.

Kenner may also refer to:

- Kenner (film), a 1969 film featuring Prem Nath and Jim Brown
- Kenner (surname)
- Kenner, Illinois, USA
- Kenner, Louisiana, USA
- Kenner Collegiate Vocational Institute, Peterborough, Ontario, Canada
- Kenner Garrard (1827–1879), brigadier general in the Union Army during the American Civil War

== See also ==
- Kennar (disambiguation)
