= Muddy Creek Forks Historic District =

Historic district in Pennsylvania, United States

- U.S. National Register of Historic Places
- U.S. Historic district
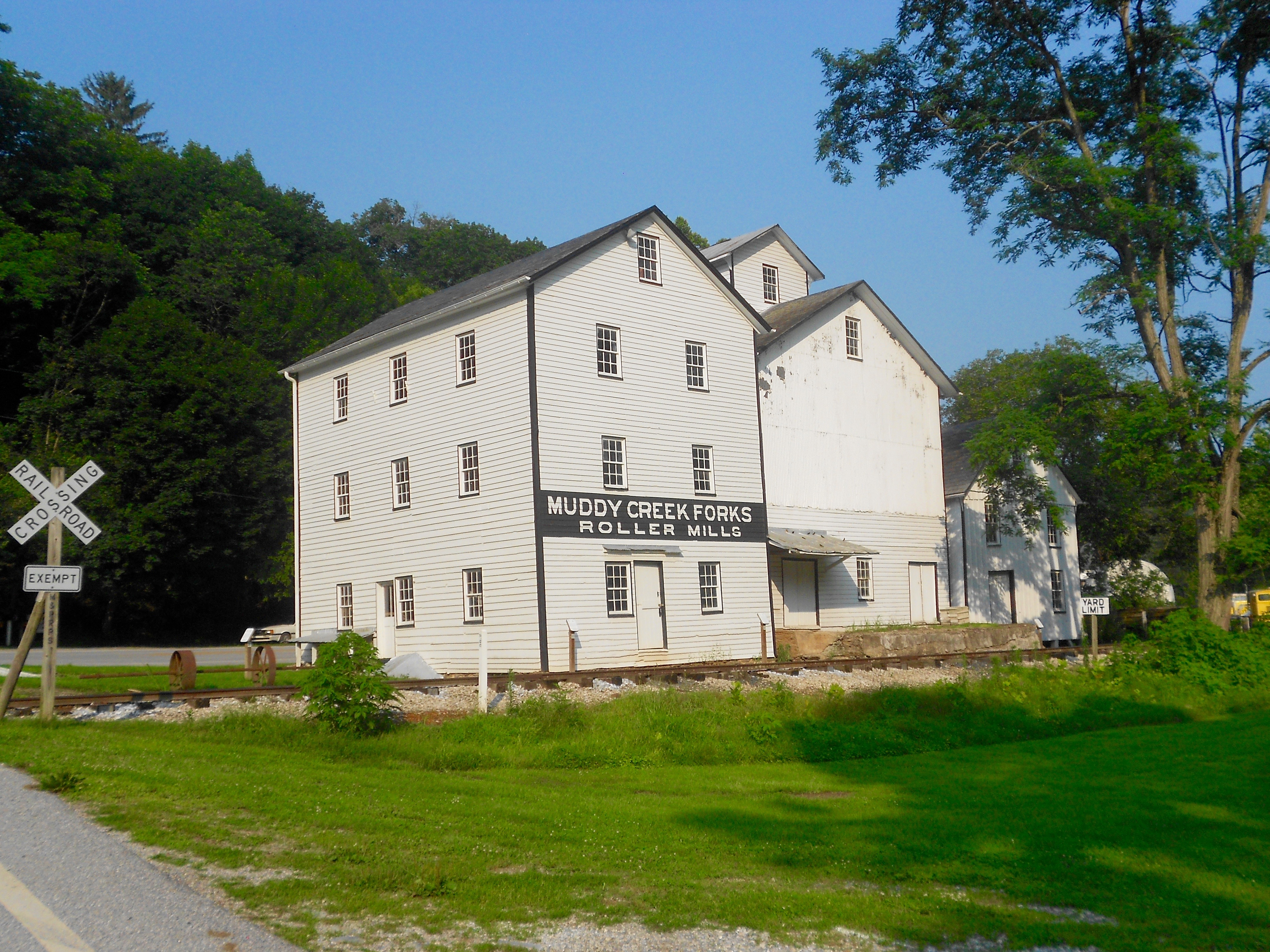

- Location within Pennsylvania Location within the United States
- Location: Jct. of Muddy Creek Forks and New Park Rds., E. Hopewell, Fawn and Long Chanceford Townships, East Hopewell, Fawn, and Lower Chanceford Townships
- Coordinates: 39°48′27″N 76°28′31″W
- Area: 42.4 acres (17.2 ha)
- Built: 1874
- Architectural style: Late Victorian, vernacular Pennsylvania farm
- NRHP reference No.: 94000397
- Added to NRHP: April 29, 1994

The Muddy Creek Forks Historic District is a national historic district that is located in the Village of Muddy Creek Forks in East Hopewell, Fawn, and Lower Chanceford Townships in York County, Pennsylvania.

It was listed on the National Register of Historic Places in 1994.

== History and architectural features ==
This district includes twelve contributing buildings, one contributing site, and five contributing structures. The buildings and structures were constructed roughly from 1800 to 1935, and include the general store, six houses, a mill, a grain elevator, a warehouse, and a Sweitzer barn. Most of the buildings incorporate Late Victorian-style details. The structures are two bridges, a corn crib, a weigh station, and a mill race. The site is the site of a former mill and mill pond.

The General Store also served as a station on the Maryland and Pennsylvania Railroad and the entire historic district is operated by the Ma & Pa Railroad Preservation Society.
