= Keener Cave, Missouri =

Extinct hamlet in Missouri, U.S.

Coordinates: 36°55′45″N 90°31′30″W

Keener Cave, Keener Cave Resort or Keener is a ghost town in southern Wayne County, in the U.S. state of Missouri. The GNIS classifies it as a populated place.

The cave and associated community lie above the west bank of the Black River on Missouri Route JJ just north of the Wayne-Butler county line. The community of Keeners lies just to the southeast in Butler County on the river's east bank.

The community most likely has the name of a family who were active in the local lumber industry. A post office called Keeners was established in 1877, and remained in operation until 1879.
