= John Kennard (cricketer) =

English cricketer

Personal information
- Full name: John Adam Gaskell Kennard
- Born: 8 November 1884; Chelsea, London, England
- Died: 6 April 1949 (aged 64); Hove, Sussex, England
- Batting: Unknown
- Bowling: Unknown

Domestic team information
- Years: Team
- 1919: Hampshire
- 1922–1923: Oxfordshire

Career statistics
Competition	First-class
Matches	2
Runs scored	46
Batting average	23.00
100s/50s	–/–
Top score	18
Balls bowled	12
Wickets	–
Bowling average	–
5 wickets in innings	–
10 wickets in match	–
Best bowling	–
Catches/stumpings	–/–
- Source: Cricinfo, 7 January 2010

John Adam Gaskell Kennard (8 November 1884 — 6 April 1949) was an English first-class cricketer and British Army officer.

The son of Adam Steinmetz Kennard, he was born at Chelsea in November 1884. He was educated at Harrow School. After leaving Harrow, he joined the British Army in September 1903, being commissioned as a second lieutenant into the Rifle Brigade. He resigned his commission in December 1905, and was involved in the exploration of oil on the coast of the Red Sea. During the First World War, he was recommissioned into the Rifle Brigade as a second lieutenant and was confirmed in the rank in January 1915. In December 1914, he was afflicted with colitis and nerves and was hospitalised, resulting in him returning home to recuperate at his father's house in Upham, Hampshire. He was promoted to lieutenant in July 1915, with promotion to captain following in March 1916. Toward the end of the war, he was seconded for service with the Ministry of National Service. Kennard relinquished his commission in April 1920, retaining the rank of captain.

Following the war, Kennard represented Hampshire in two first-class cricket matches in the 1919 County Championship against Middlesex at Lord's and Surrey at The Oval. He scored 46 runs in these matches, with a highest score of 18. He later played minor counties cricket for Oxfordshire from 1922 to 1923, making eight appearances in the Minor Counties Championship. Kennard died at Hove in April 1949.
