= Coleridge Kennard (politician) =

British politician, died 1890

Coleridge Kennard MP

Member of Parliament for Salisbury
- In office 20 November 1882 – 26 November 1885 Serving with John Passmore Edwards
- Preceded by: William Grenfell; John Passmore Edwards
- Succeeded by: William Grenfell

Personal details
- Born: 6 October 1828
- Died: 25 December 1890 (aged 62)
- Party: Conservative
- Spouse: Ellen Georgiana Rowe (m. 1858)
- Children: Two
- Parent(s): John Peirse Kennard; Sophia Chapman

Coleridge John Kennard (6 October 1828 – 25 December 1890) was a Conservative Party politician.

Kennard was the third son of banker John Peirse Kennard, of Hordle Cliff, Hampshire, and Sophia, daughter of Sir John Chapman, M.D., F.R.C.S., of Windsor.

He first stood for election in Salisbury in 1880 but was unsuccessful. However, he was then elected MP for the constituency at a by-election in 1882, but lost the seat when it was reduced to one member in 1885.

Just prior to his death, Kennard was expected to be created a baronet. However, upon his death, his grandson Coleridge Kennard received the title.

During his life, he was Deputy Lieutenant of London and a Justice of the Peace for Hampshire. He was a managing director of Heywood, Kennard and Co. bank, and co-founder of the Evening News.

Kennard married Ellen Georgiana Rowe, daughter of Captain John Wilkinson Rowe, H.E.I.C.S. in 1858. Together, they had at least two children: Meredyth Sophia Frances, and Hugh Coleridge Downing.

Parliament of the United Kingdom
Preceded by William Grenfell; John Passmore Edwards	Member of Parliament for Salisbury; 1882–1885; With: John Passmore Edwards	Next: William Grenfell
