= Martin P. Kennard =

American jeweler and reformer (1818–1903)

Martin Parry Kennard (July 24, 1818 – November 13, 1903) was a Boston businessman (by occupation a silversmith and jeweler), abolitionist, and U.S. federal government employee.

== Biography ==
Kennard was born in Portsmouth, New Hampshire. He started his career as a jeweler with the Boston firm Jones, Low & Ball, and later became a principal at Bigelow Bros. & Kennard. This company was later reorganized as Bigelow, Kennard & Co., with the partners at that time being Alanson Bigelow and William H. Kennard. The company sold "high-quality domestic and imported silver, glass, and clocks." The business operated under this name until 1971, and Harvard University holds some of the firm's records in their library special collections.

In 1854, Kennard moved to Brookline, Massachusetts, and, along with figures such as Ellis Gray Loring and William I. Bowditch, was an activist with the Boston Vigilance Committee, which was dedicated to protecting fugitive slaves. Kennard is also a primary source on the visit of Mikhail Bakunin to the United States in 1861. Kennard later became a customs house collector in Boston. From 1868 (when he ceased to take an active interest in business) until the 1890s, he held Treasury Department appointments in Boston.

He was a member of the Boston Art Club, the Boston Union Club, the Boston Commercial Club, the Mercantile Library Association (committee on lectures), the Merchants Club, and the Tuesday Club. Kennard was described a "Republican of the most pronounced stripe," and as a "staunch Unitarian" who was a member of the First Unitarian Church of Brookline. Kennard was survived by his wife Caroline Kennard, a naturalist and women's rights activist, and four children. Their son, Frederic Hedge Kennard was a landscape architect and naturalist involved in birding and in the preservation of the American bison. Frederic's daughter, Dr. Margaret Kennard, was a notable 20th-century neuropsychologist. His son Edward Parry Kennard also worked as a silversmith. The Martin Parry Kennard house now houses Brookline Music School.

== See also ==
- Lewis E. Jenks
