= Gebelein Silversmiths =

American silversmith shop

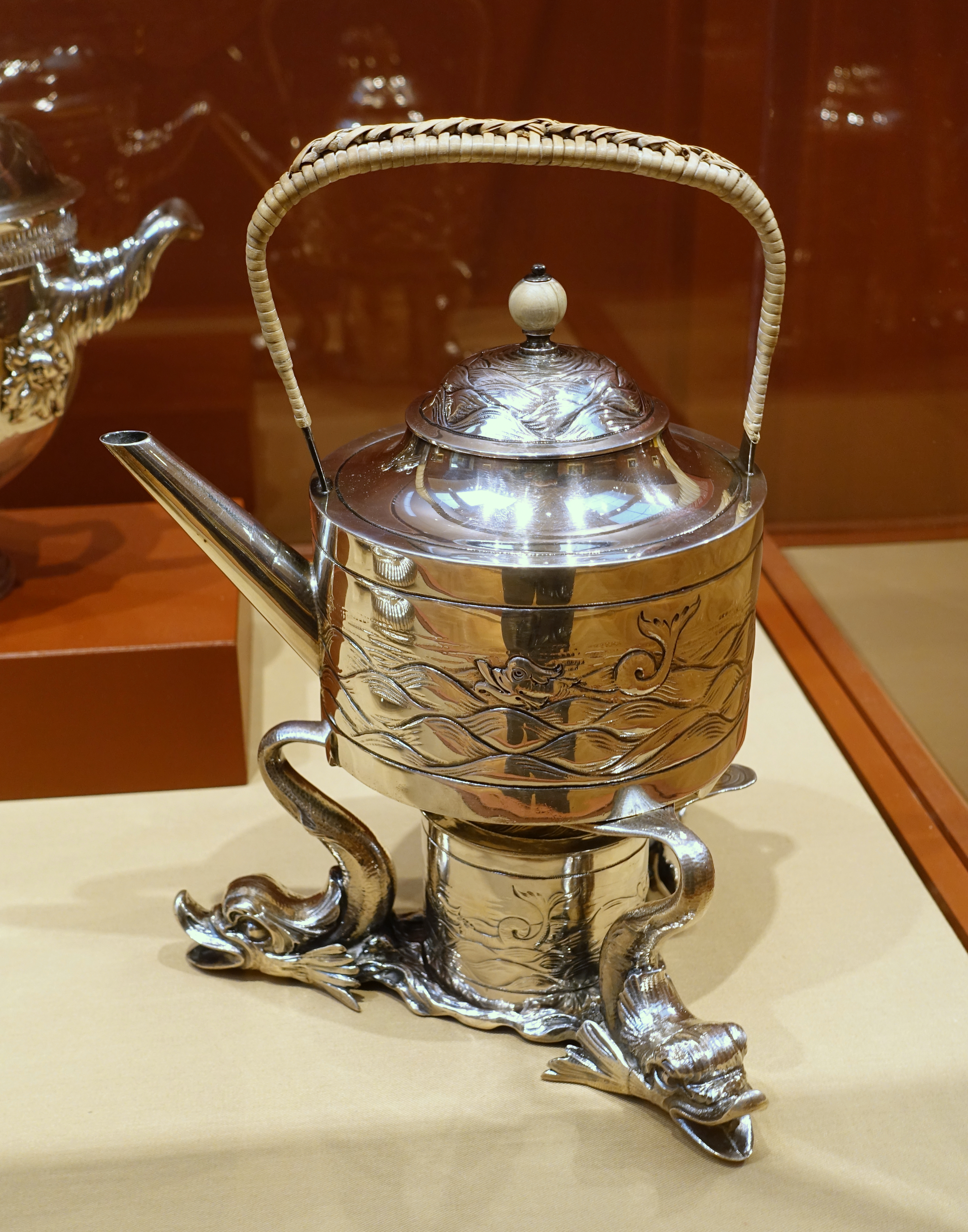
Tea kettle on stand by Gebelein Silversmiths, c. 1910

Gebelein Silversmiths was an American silversmith shop, active in Boston during the twentieth century.

The firm was founded by George Christian Gebelein (November 6, 1878 – January 25, 1945), who was born in Wüstenselbitz, Bavaria, and emigrated to Somerville, Massachusetts, with his family as an infant. There his father found work as a sausage maker. Gebelein's education ended when he completed grammar school in 1893. He started work at the Washington Mills Company but soon left to apprentice from 1893 to 1897 as a silversmith at the Boston firm of Goodnow & Jenks. The firm's principal designer, Barton Pickering Jenks, was a master member of Boston's Society of Arts and Crafts, and the contemporary Arts and Crafts movement strongly influenced Gebelein. When he became a journeyman in 1897, he joined the Tiffany & Co. factory in Forest Hill, New Jersey, where he stayed for slightly over two years. In 1900 he moved to Concord, New Hampshire, to work at the William B. Durgin Company, and in 1902 moved back to the Boston area, where he rented a workbench at The Handicraft Shop, a small cooperative venture operated by the Society of Arts and Crafts. There he received a number of commissions and in 1906 began marking his pieces with his name. In 1909 Gebelein opened his own shop at 79 Chestnut Street in Boston's Beacon Hill.

Gebelein Silversmiths began by creating handcrafted silver items on commission and continued to produce fine custom work through Gebelein's lifetime. In addition, however, it produced a large quantity of mechanically spun silver, which was then made to appear hand-crafted by decorative engravings and small hammer marks. Around 1921 the firm started retailing products made by Gorham, Reed & Barton, Currier & Roby, and the International Silver Company. In the 1920s to mid-1940s, Gebelein also made and sold copper bowls, and during the Great Depression, retailed popular Art Deco chrome pieces manufactured by Chase Brass and Copper Company. Gebelein also bought and sold antique silver. His careful studies of Colonial silver, knowledge of fabrication techniques, and skill as a craftsman made him an expert in identifying forgeries and creating high-quality reproductions. At the time of Gobelein's death, the firm was Boston's last silver handcraft shop. His family continued the business, which shifted during the 1950s to become solely a buyer and seller of antique silver. It remained at 79 Chestnut Street until 1968 when it moved to 286 Newbury Street. Eventually the family sold the name to an antiques dealer.

Gebelein Silversmiths is known for its church commissions. Its first major commission was an altar set for Grace Church (Providence, Rhode Island) in 1912. He also made communion sets for the United States Military Academy at West Point, King's Chapel and St. Peter's Church in Boston, and the College of William and Mary in Williamsburg, Virginia, and two large ciboria that were presented to the National Cathedral in Washington, DC, in 1934. The firm also created the Alexander Agassiz Cup for the inter-house rowing championship at Harvard in 1931; the Percy D. Haughton Memorial Cup for the Tennis and Racquet Club of Boston; the Halcyon and Shattuck Trophy for St. Paul's School in Concord, New Hampshire; and the "Guild Cup" commissioned by the town of Marblehead, Massachusetts, in 1937 for the America's Cup Yacht Race. Other important commissions were tea and coffee service for the USS Lexington in 1928, the restoration of the Williamsburg Mace for the Colonial Williamsburg Foundation in 1941.
