= Kinard Middle School =

Kinard Core Knowledge Junior High School

Location
- 3002 E. Trilby Rd; Fort Collins, Colorado

Information
- Type: Public middle school
- School district: Poudre School District
- Principal: Lindsey Matkin
- Grades: 6-8
- Mascot: Kinard Mustang
- Website: kin.psdschools.org

Kinard Middle School is a middle school in southeast Fort Collins, Colorado that is part of the Poudre School District. It is based on the Core Knowledge system of education, and is one of the top-performing schools in the United States, having received the John Irwin School of Excellence Award several times as well as the USDE Blue Ribbon Award in 2015. Its mascot is the "Kinard Mustang". The Kinard Mustang is often represented as "Morty" who is just a child in a costume.

The school is named for Hal Kinard, a local educator who served in the military during the Vietnam War.

== Grading system ==
Kinard's grading system resembles the GPA system at first glance, but is actually nothing like it in reality. Each assignment is graded on a scale of 1–4, based on the level of proficiency toward a grade level standard the student has achieved. Information regarding Kinard's grading system can be found at this link: https://kin.psdschools.org/academics/assessment.

== History ==
Kinard Middle School started operating out of a wing in the nearby Fossil Ridge High School in the fall of 2004, before getting its own building that opened in 2006. Many current Kinard teachers have been there every year since the school opened in the high school.
