= Cross Roads, Pennsylvania =

Borough in Pennsylvania, US

- Borough
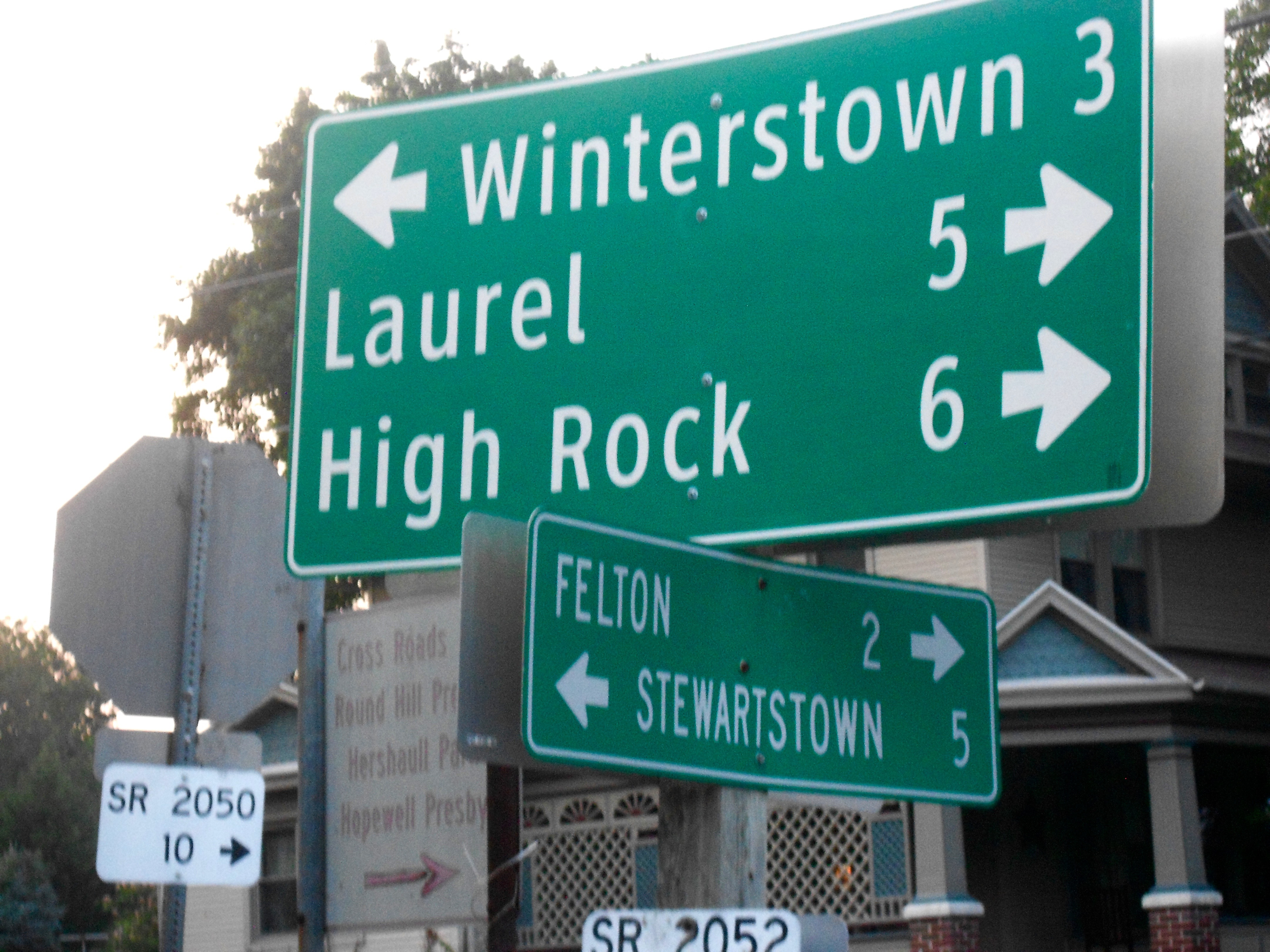
- Sign at intersection in Cross Roads

- Location in York County and the U.S. state of Pennsylvania.

- Location of Cross Roads in Pennsylvania Cross Roads (the United States)
- Coordinates: 39°48′53″N 76°34′23″W
- Country: United States
- State: Pennsylvania
- County: York
- Settled: 1844
- Incorporated: 1899

Government
  - Type: Borough Council

Area
  - Total: 1.82 sq mi (4.71 km^{2})
  - Land: 1.82 sq mi (4.71 km^{2})
  - Water: 0 sq mi (0.00 km^{2})
- Elevation: 764 ft (233 m)

Population (2020)
  - Total: 520
  - Density: 288/sq mi (111.1/km^{2})
- Time zone: UTC-5 (Eastern (EST))
  - Summer (DST): UTC-4 (EDT)
- ZIP code: 17322
- Area code: 717
- FIPS code: 42-17416

Cross Roads is a borough in York County, Pennsylvania, United States. The population was 530 at the 2020 census. It is part of the York–Hanover metropolitan area. The crossroads in the borough is where Church Road (SR 2050) intersects Cross Roads Avenue (SR 2079) and is joined by Century Farms Road.

== Geography ==
Cross Roads is located at 39°48′53″N 76°34′23″W (39.814737, -76.573146).

According to the United States Census Bureau, the borough has a total area of 1.9 square miles (4.9 km^{2}), all land.

== Demographics ==
Historical population
Census	Pop.	Note	%±
1880	47		—
1900	167		—
1910	158		−5.4%
1920	144		−8.9%
1930	153		6.3%
1940	175		14.4%
1950	178		1.7%
1960	166		−6.7%
1970	163		−1.8%
1980	267		63.8%
1990	322		20.6%
2000	518		60.9%
2010	512		−1.2%
2020	523		2.1%
2023 (est.)	537	▲	2.7%

As of the census of 2000, there were 518 people, 175 households, and 149 families living in the borough. The population density was 275.5 inhabitants per square mile (106.4/km^{2}). There were 185 housing units at an average density of 98.4 units per square mile (38.0 units/km^{2}). The racial makeup of the borough was 96.14% White, 2.90% African American, 0.19% Asian, and 0.77% from two or more races. Hispanic or Latino of any race were 0.39% of the population.

There were 175 households, out of which 44.0% had children under the age of 18 living with them, 77.7% were married couples living together, 5.1% had a female householder with no husband present, and 14.3% were non-families. 10.3% of all households were made up of individuals, and 4.0% had someone living alone who was 65 years of age or older. The average household size was 2.96 and the average family size was 3.19.

In the borough the population was spread out, with 31.1% under the age of 18, 6.4% from 18 to 24, 33.6% from 25 to 44, 23.0% from 45 to 64, and 6.0% who were 65 years of age or older. The median age was 34 years. For every 100 females there were 97.0 males. For every 100 females age 18 and over, there were 96.2 males.

The median income for a household in the borough was $57,750, and the median income for a family was $60,556. Males had a median income of $40,000 versus $31,875 for females. The per capita income for the borough was $20,063. About 2.5% of families and 3.0% of the population were below the poverty line, including 3.4% of those under age 18 and none of those age 65 or over.

== Education ==
Cross Roads Borough is served by the South Eastern School District which provides public education.
