= Sir Coleridge Kennard, 1st Baronet =

English aristocrat and diplomat (1885–1948)

Lieutenant Colonel Sir Coleridge Kennard Bt
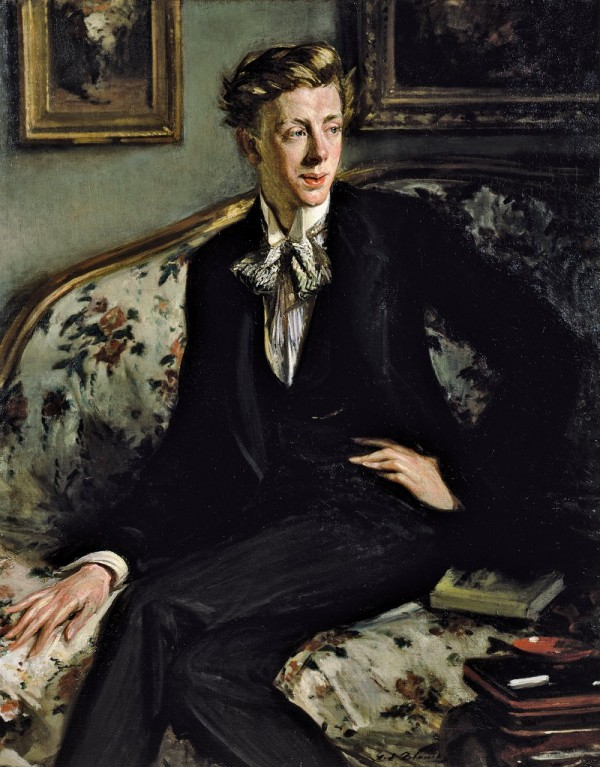
- Portrait of Kennard by Jacques-Émile Blanche, 1904.
- Preceded by: New creation
- Succeeded by: Sir Lawrence Kennard, 2nd Baronet

Personal details
- Born: Coleridge Arthur Fitzroy Kennard; 12 May 1885
- Died: 7 October 1948 (aged 63)
- Spouse(s): Dorothy Katherine Barclay (m. 1911; div. 1918) Mary Graham Orr-Lewis (m. 1924; died 1931)
- Relations: Coleridge Kennard (grandfather); James Laurence Carew (stepfather)
- Children: 2
- Parent(s): Helen Wyllie Kennard; Hugh Coleridge Downing Kennard
- Education: Eton College

Sir Coleridge 'Roy' Arthur Fitzroy Kennard, 1st Baronet (12 May 1885 – 7 October 1948) was a wealthy English diplomat. He is mostly remembered as a supporter and literary confidant of Ronald Firbank.

== Parentage ==
Kennard was the only child of Helen (née Wyllie) Kennard (1856–1928) and Lieutenant Hugh Coleridge Downing Kennard (1859–1886) of the 1st Battalion of the Grenadier Guards, who married in 1883. After his father's death in 1886, his mother remarried to James Laurence Carew, an Irish nationalist politician and Member of Parliament, in 1896.

== Baronetcy and fortune ==
In 1891, the then five-year-old Kennard was created baronet of Fernhill in the County of Southampton. The baronetcy was originally intended for his grandfather and namesake Coleridge Kennard, co-founder of the Evening News and Member of Parliament for Salisbury from 1882 to 1885, who had died on 25 December 1890, before the patent was gazetted. His grandmother Ellen Georgiana Kennard had on 17 January 1892 been granted the style and precedence as if her husband had been created a baronet.

Kennard also inherited the bulk of the fortune of his grandfather.

== Early life ==
Kennard was educated at Eton College. In 1904, Jacques-Émile Blanche painted a portrait of him at the age of 19, capturing him as an effeminate dandy. His mother, a good friend to the memory of Oscar Wilde, strongly disapproved of the portrait, which caused a "life-long rift" between his mother and Blanche, whom he told: "my portrait is too revealing. It has shown her the real Roy, whom in her heart of hearts she imagined quite different. You have seen into my future..." The portrait was exhibited anonymously in 1924 under the title "Le portrait de Dorian Gray". In 1909, his mother instigated the commission of the Oscar Wilde's tomb in Père Lachaise Cemetery in Paris by Jacob Epstein with her donation to Robert Ross.

== Career ==
After serving in the Grenadier Guards like his father, Kennard joined the Diplomatic Service, serving between 1908 and 1919, in Italy, Persia, Sweden and Finland.

During World War II, Kennard was imprisoned by the Germans in the concentration camp established at St Denis. Following his release in 1945, he published a book of doggerel verse 'Les Complaintes de St. Denis'.

== Personal life ==
Kennard married twice, and fathered two sons, and is rumoured to have been bisexual, not least due to some of his homoerotic verse.

While serving at the foreign office, Kennard "became infatuated with the wife of James Frances Buckley, of Castle Gorford, in Carmarthenshire. After Kennard made his intentions of marriage known, in writing (and threatening suicide if she did not elope with him), Buckley and his wife divorced. While waiting for the statutory six-month period to expire, Mrs. Buckley went to Italy and Kennard went to Persia to serve as attaché and third secretary under Sir George Head Barclay. While in Tehran, he met Barclay's daughter, Dorothy Katherine Barclay (c. 1890–1953). Kennard and Dorothy fell in love, and when Mrs. Buckley travelled to Tehran to meet him, he refused to see her. As British Minister Plenipotentiary, who had authority over all British subjects in Persia, Sir George forced Mrs. Buckley to leave the country.

Kennard married Dorothy on 5 April 1911, Dorothy, an author who published a book about her life in Roumania, was the only child of Barclay and his American wife, Lady Barclay, the former Beatrix Mary Jay Chapman. Dorothy's maternal grandfather was Henry Grafton Chapman Jr., who served as President of the New York Stock Exchange, and her uncle was noted writer John Jay Chapman. Her maternal great-grandfather was John Jay, the U.S. Minister to Austria-Hungary. Before their 1918 divorce, they were the parents of two sons:

- Sir Lawrence Ury Charles Kennard, 2nd Baronet (1912–1967), who married Joan Liesl Perschke, daughter of William Thomas Perschke.
- Sir George Arnold Ford Kennard, 3rd Baronet (1915–1999), a Lieutenant-Colonel of the 4th Queen's Own Hussars who married four times.

In 1924, Kennard married for the second time to Mary Graham Orr-Lewis (d. 1931), youngest daughter of Canadian businessman Sir Frederick Orr-Lewis, 1st Baronet and Maude (née Booth) Orr-Lewis. After her father's death, her brother became the 2nd Baronet, and her sister, Helen Merryday Orr-Lewis, married Sir Albert Gerald Stern.

Kennard died on 7 October 1948 and his eldest son became the 2nd Kennard baronet. Upon the death of his youngest son, the third Baronet, the baronetcy became extinct as there were no male issue.

== Literary Works ==
- Olympia, Or How the Secrets of the East were Lost For Ever: an extravaganza (Arthur Barker, London 1934), a Firbankian tale set in Persia.
- Les Complaintes de St Denis (Jacques Haumont, Paris 1945), erotic doggeral, some homoerotic.
- Caresses et Blasphèmes (Impr. de J. Haumont, Paris 1945), erotic doggeral, some homoerotic.
- Gestapo: France, 1943-1945 (Grant Richards, London 1947); an account of Gestapo activities and atrocities in France.

Baronetage of the United Kingdom
New creation	Baronet (of Fernhill); 1891–1948	Succeeded by Lawrence Ury Charles Kennard
