= Kennards House =

Coordinates: 50.622°N 4.422°W

- Location within Cornwall
- OS grid reference: SX 288 830
- Civil parish: South Petherwin
- Unitary authority: Cornwall
- Ceremonial county: Cornwall
- Region: South West
- Country: England
- Sovereign state: United Kingdom
- Post town: LAUNCESTON
- Postcode district: PL15
- Dialling code: 01566
- Police: Devon and Cornwall
- Fire: Cornwall
- Ambulance: South Western
- UK Parliament: North Cornwall

Kennards House is a small settlement in east Cornwall, United Kingdom, situated at grid reference SX 287 830 in the civil parish of South Petherwin .

Kennards House is half-a-mile from the larger village of Tregadillett and three miles (5 km) west of Launceston. The location is familiar to motorists as it is signposted Kennards House Junction on the A30 trunk road; the location is a two-level junction of A30, the A395 road and two unclassified minor roads.

To the north of the A395 at Kennards House are Trethorne Leisure Park (a tourist attraction) and Trethorne Golf Club's golf course.
