= Keeners, Missouri =

- Unincorporated community
- Location within Missouri Location within the United States
- Coordinates: 36°55′23″N 90°30′20″W
- Country: United States
- State: Missouri
- County: Butler
- Elevation: 367 ft (112 m)
- Time zone: UTC-6 (Central (CST))
  - Summer (DST): UTC-5 (CDT)
- Area code: 573
- GNIS feature ID: 750566

Keeners is an unincorporated community in northern Butler County, in the U.S. state of Missouri. U.S. Route 67 passes approximately 1.5 mile to the southeast. The Missouri Pacific Railway passes the west side of the community along the Black River floodplain.

The community lies on the northeast bank of the Black River approximately one-quarter mile south of the Butler-Wayne County line. The community of Keener Cave or Keener in adjacent Wayne County lies just to the northwest on the west side of the river.

== History ==
A post office called Keeners was established in 1879, the name was changed to Kenner in 1890, and the post office closed in 1919. The community was named after Ephraim B. Keener, a local landowner. The Missouri Pacific Railroad line passed through the community.
