= Caroline Kennard =

American naturalist and reformer (1827–1907)

Caroline Augusta Smith
- Born: January 15, 1827; Portsmouth, New Hampshire
- Died: October 24, 1907 (aged 80)

Caroline Augusta Kennard, née Smith (15 January 1827 - 24 October 1907) was an American amateur scientist and advocate of women's rights. In correspondence with Charles Darwin she challenged his views on the inferiority of women.

== Life ==
Caroline Augusta Smith was born on 15 January 1827 in Portsmouth, New Hampshire. She was the daughter of James Wiggin Smith and Eliza Folsom, who lived first in Exeter, New Hampshire and later in New York City. She married Martin P. Kennard (1818-1903), a businessman in Boston, Massachusetts, in July 1846. Martin Kennard was an anti-slavery activist, who moved to Brookline, Massachusetts in 1854. He helped the black sculptor Edmonia Lewis apply for a passport in 1865. Martin Kennard also maintained a successful business as a jeweller at Bigelow Brothers & Kennard in Boston. In addition, he served at an Assistant Treasurer of the Sub-Treasury of the United States in Botston, appointed by Presidents Hayes and Grant (1879-1887) and later by President Harrison (1891-1895).

In 1882, Caroline Kennard entered into correspondence with Darwin, arguing against women being judged intellectually inferior to men.

Kennard was listed in the 1885 Scientist's International Directory as interested in the botany of ferns and mosses. She published a biography of Dorothea Dix in the late 1880s which consisted of a collection of letters from Dix's contemporaries. The biography included letters from Jane Alexander, A.L. Barnett, James Freeman Clarke, John Murray Forbes, Robert Bennet Forbes, Horoatio Appleton Lamb, Mary S. Langley, William Henry Lyon, Andrew Preston Peabody, Samuel Edmund Sewall, and Edward Sterns.

In 1892, Kennard donated fruit from her own Ricus elastica plant (rubber tree) to the Boston Society of Natural History.

On Kennard's death, a science scholarship at Radcliffe College was established in her memory by her sister, Mrs Martha T. Fiske Collord.

Kennard's son Frederic Hedge Kennard (1865-1937) was an ornithologist.

== Career ==
After Caroline Kennard married Martin Perry Kennard in 1847, the newly wedded couple decided on a home located within the outskirts of Boston in Brookline, MA, moving in 1854. Caroline Kennard was a prominent member of a woman's group located within Boston, which was called the New England Woman's Club. This Club was the very first woman's club that had formed at this time within the US. During the 1880s and 1890s, Kennard was not only an active member of the New England Woman's Club, serving as the Vice President in 1893 for one year, she was also a member of the board of directors.

Furthermore, Kennard was extremely passionate about women's issues and she attended various meetings for the Association of the Advancement of Women. It was at one of these meetings in 1896 where she read a paper aloud to all in attendance arguing that housework should be measured in economic terms; this paper was entitled, “Housekeeping a profession”. She was particularly interested in educational reforms for women and became dedicated to promoting many issues involved in the woman's movement, including the inferior status of women within society.

In the 1880s and 1890s, Kennard's concern regarding the status and treatment of women in society persisted as she served as an officer within the Women's Educational and Industrial Union. She was actively involved in social reform her entire life as she published a variety of articles on social reform. For example, in 1895 she became a member of the Brookline Education Society, which was concerned about the moral and spiritual development of children both at school and within the home. More specifically, Kennard prepared a paper for this organization, which she read in 1896, emphasizing the need for children to study nature as she believed this positively impacted their development and education in the long run. In addition, she wrote an article entitled, “Progress in the Employment of Police Matrons”, which encouraged the police force to employ more female officers. Additionally, she wrote articles about important, well-known female activists and poets.

=== Challenging Darwin ===
Nonetheless, despite her interests in women's issues and social reform within the nation, she was also intrigued by science, particularly the study of mosses and ferns. Due to her interests in both science and improving women's social status, she challenged Charles Darwin's theory regarding the biological inferiority of women. Consequently, Kennard is best known for her correspondence with Darwin himself in regards to his belief that women are biologically inferior to men, which she wholeheartedly disagreed with.

The theory that Kennard questioned was found within Darwin's On the Origin of Species, which emphasized that women are in fact inferior to men. Kennard became uneasy after she heard a woman use Darwin's Origin of Species theory regarding women's inferiority as evidence that women are scientifically inferior to their male counterparts. As a result, this incident motivated Kennard to personally write Darwin in 1881 declaring that this was inaccurate as she attested that women are not scientifically inferior to men. Kennard's goal was to receive clarification from Darwin as she did not think this theory held any truth.

In response, Darwin wrote back to Kennard, referencing his work Descent of Man as he stated, “I certainly think that women though generally superior to men [in] moral qualities are inferior intellectually.” Darwin noted that the only way to solve this inferiority and for the sexes to be considered equal was for women to become “breadwinners," or to assume economic responsibility and make their own money through work. However, Darwin continued by emphasizing that if women became “breadwinners” this would negatively harm the domestic, household sphere where he felt women belonged by resulting in the neglect of children and other household duties. This is illustrated in his letter to Kennard claiming, “To do this, as I believe, women must become as regular ‘bread-winners’ as are men; and we may suspect that the easy education of our children, not to mention the happiness of our homes, would in this case greatly suffer.”

Ultimately, Darwin’s response infuriated Kennard and she wrote him back on January 28, 1882, arguing that women were certainly “breadwinners” and were not inferior to men. She continued by writing that women were simply not given the same opportunities that men were, including environmental and educational opportunities. Kennard maintained that women were capable of being just as intellectual as men, yet the lack of opportunities afforded to women in society negatively impacted their level of intellect. She argued this was primarily because the scarcity of opportunities did not allow women to foster and develop their intellect, unlike men who were given extensive opportunities, especially in terms of education.

Furthermore, Kennard expressed to Darwin in their correspondence that women were crucial to society because they worked equally as hard as their male counterparts. She went on to state that the major difference between the two sexes was the type of work men and women did; essentially, the work that was considered socially acceptable for women to carry out was the work they allowed to partake in such as the tasks of homemaking and child-rearing. Consequently, Kennard wrote, “Let the ‘environment’ of women be similar to that of men and with his opportunities, before she be fairly judged, intellectually his inferior, please.” In other words, Kennard believed that if women were given the same opportunities as men, the inequalities that women faced in society, like the notion that women were subordinate to men intellectually, would dissipate.

== Works ==
- Miss Dorothea L. Dix and her Life-Work, 1888.
- "Progress in the Employment of Police Matrons," The Trenton Times (1892), pp 6.
- "The Bradstreet Writings," The Governor Thomas Dudley Family Association, Fourth Annual Meeting and Fifth Reunion (1896), pp. 29–36.
