= Daniel K. Sadler =

American judge (1882–1960)

Daniel Kennard Sadler

Justice of the New Mexico Supreme Court
- In office January 1, 1931 – May 15, 1959
- Preceded by: John F. Simms
- Succeeded by: Tony Scarborough

Personal details
- Born: October 28, 1882 Paris, Arkansas, U.S.
- Died: April 2, 1960 (aged 77) Santa Fe, New Mexico, U.S.
- Education: University of Arkansas; Washington and Lee University School of Law

Daniel Kennard Sadler (October 28, 1882 – April 2, 1960) was an American lawyer and justice on the New Mexico Supreme Court. He was the longest-serving justice in the court's history during statehood, with a tenure of 28 years.

== Early life and education ==
Sadler was born on October 28, 1882, in Paris, Arkansas. He graduated from the University of Arkansas in 1905 and earned his law degree at Washington and Lee University School of Law.

== Career ==
Sadler practiced law for six years in Dallas, Texas. He moved to New Mexico in 1915, practiced for three years in Santa Fe, and then for eleven years in Raton.

Sadler was first elected to the New Mexico Supreme Court in 1930. It was his first candidacy for public office. He served as chief justice from 1935 to 1936, from June 1, 1943, to March 15, 1945, from March 28 to December 31, 1946, and again in 1953.

== Personal life ==
Sadler married Jessie McGaugh, a native of Gentry, Arkansas, on August 27, 1911. They had two sons, Daniel Jr. and Robert G.

== Final years and death ==
Sadler had several heart attacks in the 1950s. He retired on May 15, 1959. His health continued to decline, and he was admitted to St. Vincent Hospital in Santa Fe on March 11, 1960. He died in the hospital on the evening of April 2, 1960.

== Legacy ==
At his death, his 28-year tenure was the longest of any justice on the New Mexico Supreme Court during statehood. He is buried at Fairview Cemetery in Santa Fe.
