= Kenner (surname) =

Kenner is a surname. Notable people with the surname include:

- Chris Kenner, R&B singer/songwriter popular in the early 1960s
- Duncan F. Kenner, advocate for the Confederate States of America in the 1860s
- George Kenner, (1888-1971), German artist, made 110 paintings and drawings during the First World War while interned as a POW
- Hugh Kenner, Canadian literary scholar and author
- Kevin Kenner, American concert pianist
- William Kenner (1774–1824), Louisiana businessman and father of Duncan F. Kenner
