= Fawn Township, York County, Pennsylvania =

Township in Pennsylvania, US

Coordinates: 39°44′00″N 76°26′59″W

- Township
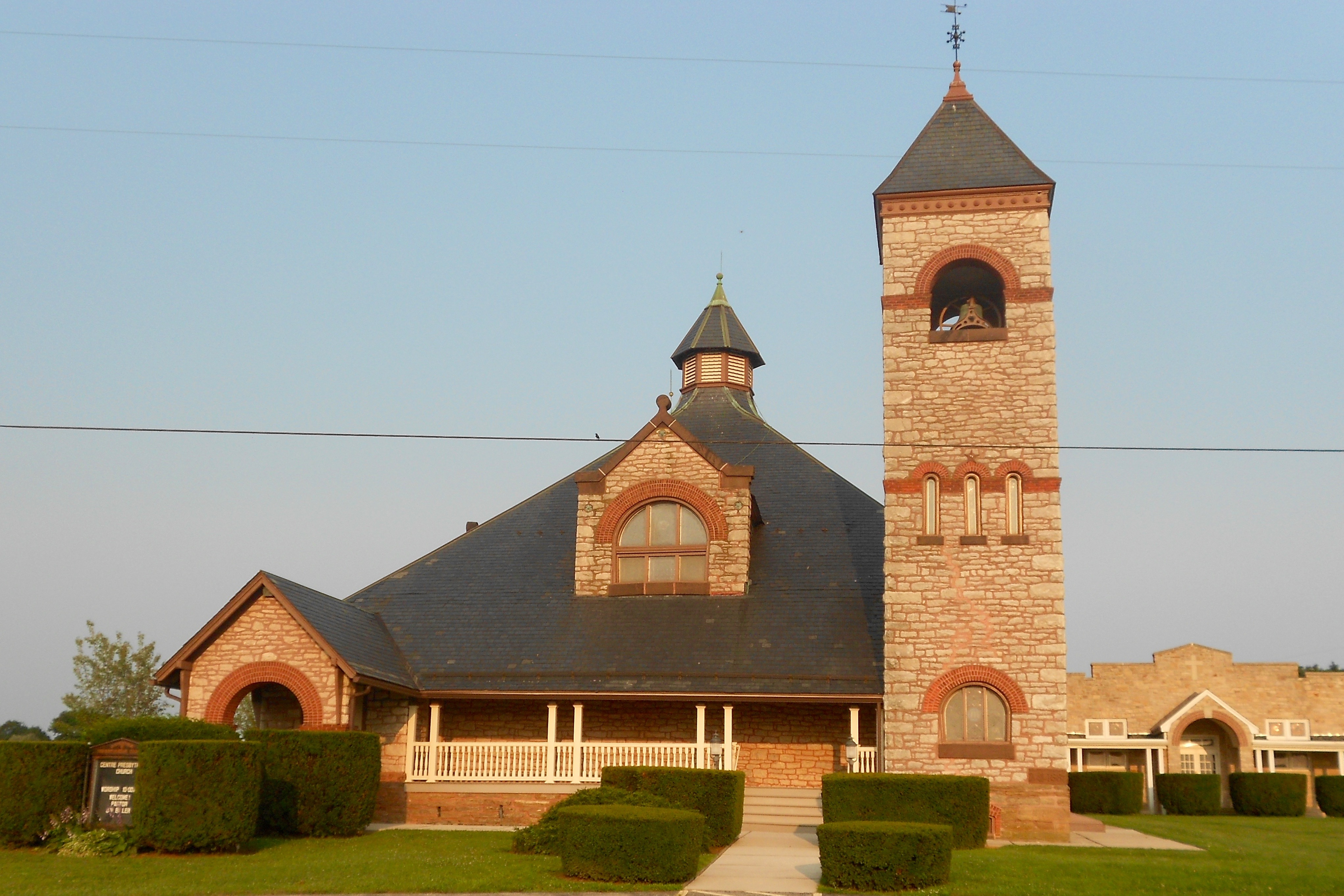
- Centre Presbyterian Church

- Location in York County and the state of Pennsylvania.
- Country: United States
- State: Pennsylvania
- County: York
- Settled: 1734
- Incorporated: 1745

Government
  - Type: Board of Supervisors

Area
  - Total: 27.11 sq mi (70.22 km^{2})
  - Land: 27.10 sq mi (70.20 km^{2})
  - Water: 0.0077 sq mi (0.02 km^{2})

Population (2020)
  - Total: 3,012 ▼
  - Estimate (2023): 3,014
  - Density: 115.9/sq mi (44.73/km^{2})
- Time zone: UTC-5 (Eastern (EST))
  - Summer (DST): UTC-4 (EDT)
- Area code: 717
- FIPS code: 42-133-25408
- Website: https://fawntwp.org/

Historical population
Census	Pop.	Note	%±
1850	1,043		—
1860	1,402		34.4%
1870	1,457		3.9%
1880	1,685		15.6%
1890	1,647		−2.3%
1900	1,554		−5.6%
1910	1,474		−5.1%
1920	1,456		−1.2%
1930	1,357		−6.8%
1940	1,281		−5.6%
1950	1,328		3.7%
1990	2,175		—
2000	2,727		25.4%
2010	3,099		13.6%
2020	3,012		−2.8%
2023 (est.)	3,014		0.1%
U.S. Decennial Census

Fawn Township is a township in York County, Pennsylvania, United States. The population was 3,012 at the 2020 census.

== History ==
Payne's Folly was listed on the National Register of Historic Places in 1986. Also in Fawn Township is part of the Muddy Creek Forks Historic District.

== Geography ==
According to the United States Census Bureau, the township has a total area of 27.1 square miles (70 km^{2}), of which 0.04% is water. It surrounds on three sides the borough of Fawn Grove, with the Maryland-Pennsylvania border (the Mason–Dixon line) forming the southern boundary of both township and borough.

== Demographics ==
As of the census of 2000, there were 2,727 people, 957 households, and 778 families living in the township. The population density was 100.8 inhabitants per square mile (38.9/km^{2}). There were 994 housing units at an average density of 36.7 units per square mile (14.2 units/km^{2}). The racial makeup of the township was 97.80% White, 0.81% African American, 0.26% Native American, 0.40% Asian, 0.48% from other races, and 0.26% from two or more races. Hispanic or Latino of any race were 0.29% of the population.

There were 957 households, out of which 40.2% had children under the age of 18 living with them, 71.8% were married couples living together, 5.3% had a female householder with no husband present, and 18.7% were non-families. 14.1% of all households were made up of individuals, and 6.1% had someone living alone who was 65 years of age or older. The average household size was 2.85 and the average family size was 3.17.

In the township the population was spread out, with 28.3% under the age of 18, 6.2% from 18 to 24, 32.4% from 25 to 44, 23.7% from 45 to 64, and 9.4% who were 65 years of age or older. The median age was 37 years. For every 100 females, there were 98.5 males. For every 100 females age 18 and over, there were 98.4 males.

The median income for a household in the township was $54,018, and the median income for a family was $60,104. Males had a median income of $39,484 versus $27,321 for females. The per capita income for the township was $20,271. About 2.2% of families and 3.0% of the population were below the poverty line, including 1.8% of those under age 18 and 3.4% of those age 65 or over.
