= Kennard-Dale High School =

High school in Pennsylvania, United States

Coordinates: 39.73232°N 76.46368°W

Kennard-Dale High School is a mid-sized, rural, public high school located at 393 Main Street, Fawn Grove, Pennsylvania, United States, in York County. It is the sole high school in the South Eastern School District. According to the National Center for Education Statistics, in 2010, Kennard-Dale High School reported an enrollment of 936 pupils in grades 9th through 12th. Kennard-Dale High School's mascot is a Ram. The school colors are blue and gold.

In 2012, Kennard-Dale High School reported employing 78 teachers, yielding a student–teacher ratio of 12:1.

== Extracurriculars ==
South Eastern School District's students have access to a variety of clubs and activities, as well as an extensive sports program.

=== Sports ===
Boys

- Baseball – AAA
- Basketball – AAAS
- Cross country – AA
- Football – AAAA
- Golf – AAA
- Lacrosse – AAAA
- Soccer – AA
- Track and field – AAA
- Volleyball – AA
- Wrestling – AAA

Girls

- Basketball – AAAA
- Cross country – AA
- Field hockey – AA
- Golf – AAA
- Lacrosse – AAAA
- Soccer (fall) – AA
- Softball – AAA
- Tennis – AAA
- Track and field – AAA
- Volleyball – AA

== Notable alumni ==
- John Stefanowicz, Greco-Roman wrestler
- Kelli Kaeb, Social Worker LP
