= William B. Durgin Company =

Silver manufacturer

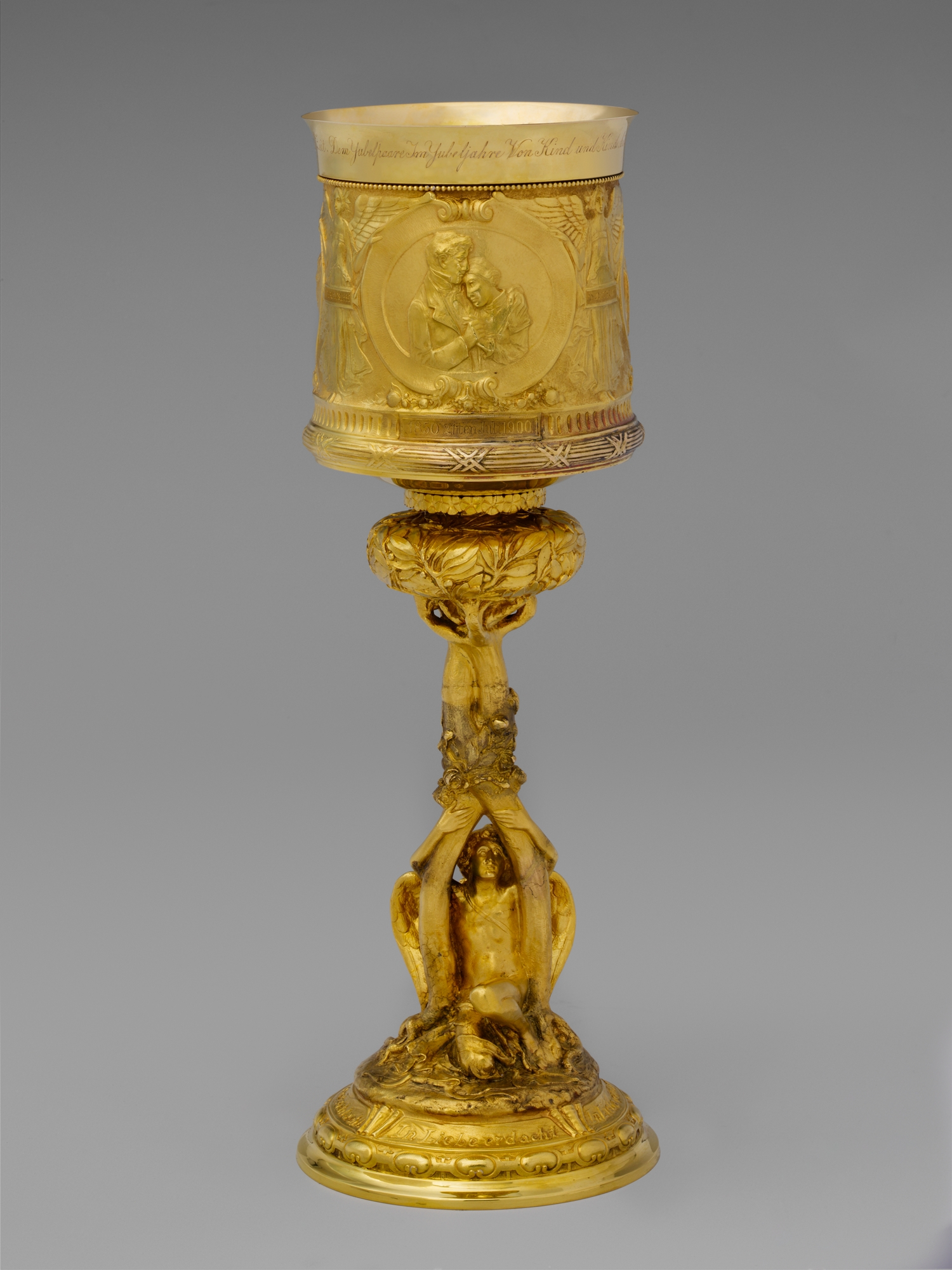
Standing Cup by the William B. Durgin Company, gold, circa 1900

The William B. Durgin Company (1853–1924) also known as the Durgin Silver Company, was a noted American sterling silver manufacturer based in Concord, New Hampshire, and one of the largest flatware and hollowware manufacturers in the United States. Over the period 1905–1924 it was merged into the Gorham Manufacturing Company.

== History ==
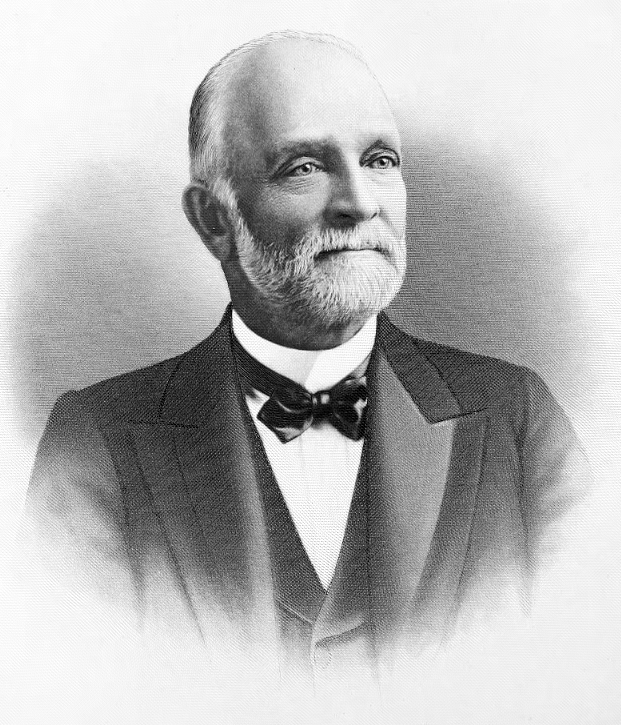
William Butler Durgin

The company was founded by silversmith William Butler Durgin (July 29, 1833 – May 6, 1905). Durgin was born in Campton, New Hampshire, and from 1849-1853 apprenticed to Boston silversmith Newell Harding. In the 1840s Durgin moved back to Concord, where he opened a small shop making spoons opposite the Free Bridge Road. He incorporated as William B. Durgin Company in 1853, in 1854 added the manufacture of silverware, and in 1866 established a large brick factory on School Street. In 1905, after the death of both Durgin and his son, George F. Durgin, the company was acquired by Gorham through a long process that culminated with an official purchase in 1924. Production was moved to Providence, Rhode Island in 1931.

The company made the Davis Cup, the silver service for the battleship USS New Hampshire, and medals for St. Paul's School. Its Fairfax flatware was for some years the best-selling pattern in the United States. Other of the company's patterns included Bead, Chatham, Chrysanthemum, Cromwell, Dauphin, English Rose, Essex, Fairfax, Hunt Club, Iris, Lenox, Louis XV, Madame Royale, Marechal Niel, New Vintage, Orange Blossom, Sheaf of Wheat, Victorian/Sheraton, and Watteau.
