= Kennard baronets =

Extinct baronetcy in the Baronetage of the United Kingdom

Escutcheon of the Kennard baronets of Fernhill

The Kennard baronetcy, of Fernhill in the County of Southampton, was a title in the Baronetage of the United Kingdom. It was created on 11 February 1891 for the five-year-old Coleridge Kennard. He was the son of Hugh Coleridge Downing Kennard of the Grenadier Guards (died 1886) and his wife Helen Wyllie. He went on to a career as a diplomat.

The baronetcy was originally intended for his grandfather Coleridge Kennard, co-founder of the Evening News and Member of Parliament for Salisbury from 1882 to 1885, who had died before the patent was gazetted. His grandmother Ellen Georgiana Kennard was granted the style and precedence as if her husband had been created a baronet. She was the daughter of John Wilkinson Rowe, and niece of Joshua Rowe.

The title became extinct on the death of the 3rd Baronet in 1999.

== Kennard baronets, of Fernhill (1891) ==
- Sir Coleridge Arthur Fitzroy Kennard, 1st Baronet (1885–1948)
- Sir Lawrence Ury Charles Kennard, 2nd Baronet (1912–1967)
- Sir George Arnold Ford Kennard, 3rd Baronet (1915–1999). He had a daughter Zandra by his first marriage.

== Notes ==
Baronetage of the United Kingdom
Preceded by Quain baronets	Kennard baronets of Fernhill; 11 February 1891	Succeeded by Stephen baronets
