= Andrew Johnston (Scottish politician) =

Scottish politician and abolitionist

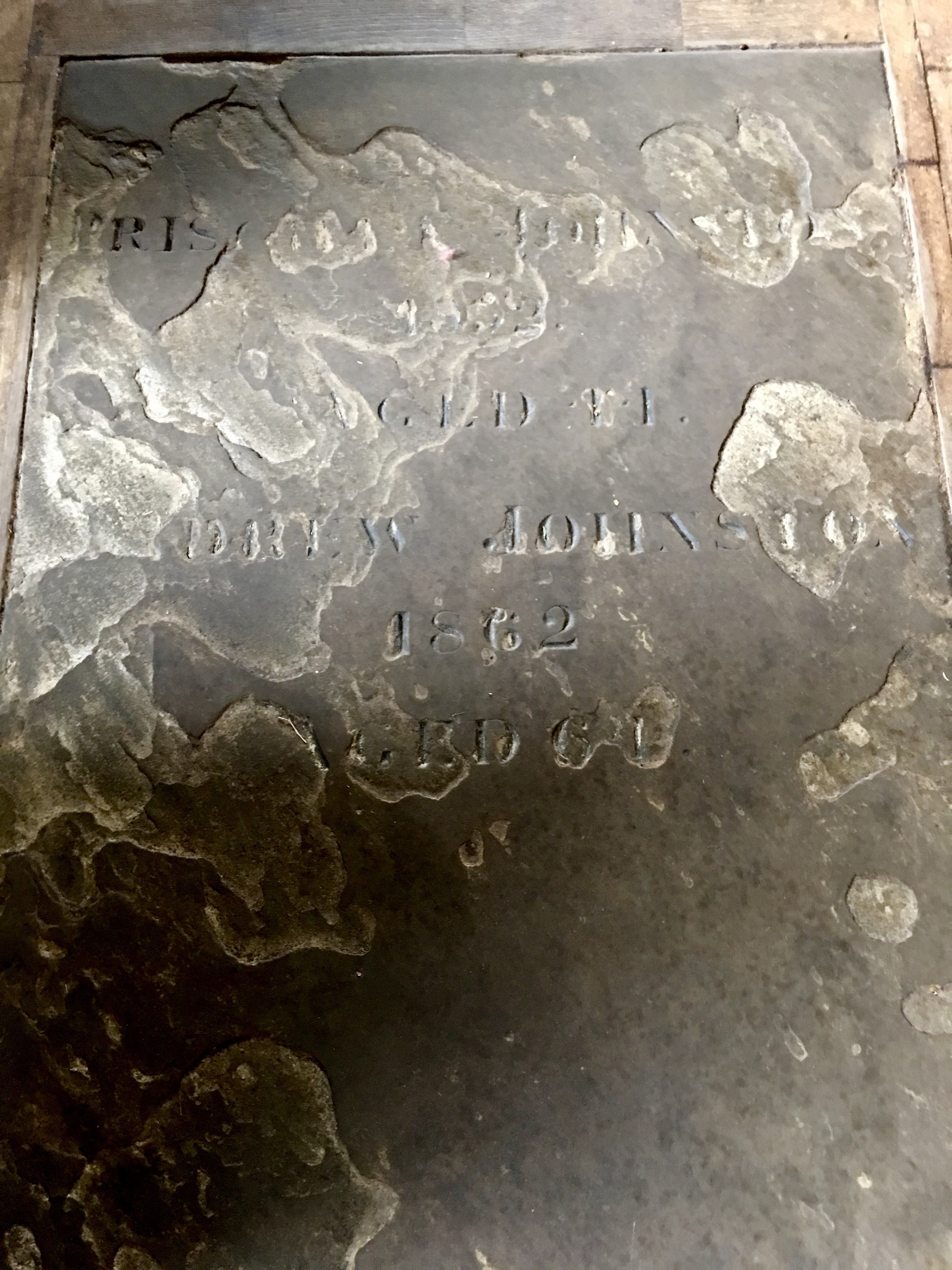
The burial vault for Andrew and Priscilla Johnston in Overstrand church

Andrew Johnston (1798 – 24 August 1862) was an abolitionist and Whig politician in Scotland. His wife was Priscilla Buxton.

== Life ==
Johnston was born in 1798 to Andrew Johnston of Rennyhill. Johnston was elected in 1831 as a Member of Parliament (MP) for the Anstruther District of Burghs, and when that constituency was abolished by the Reform Act 1832 he was elected at the 1832 general election for the new St Andrews District of Burghs. He held that seat until he stood down from the House of Commons at the 1837 general election.

According to Annals of an East Anglian Bank by the 19th-century magazine editor Walter Hilliard Bidwell:

Mr. Andrew Johnston was descended from a line of small Fife lairds, whose estate lay in the "East Neuk." He was born in 1798 in his father's house at Kilrenny—one of five "Boroughs," mere fishing villages, whose Close Corporations returned one member to the unreformed Parliament. At the age of thirty-three Mr. Johnston was thus chosen. This is not very intelligible to us now, considering that he was an active member of the political party that pledged to put an end to all such anomalies. Perhaps the canny Scots knew what they were about, at any rate it turned out well for the constituency. Had they returned a Tory, he would not have been listened to, whereas Mr. Johnston, as a supporter of Lord Grey's Government, was able to procure a change in their original intention of simple disfranchisement, and the five boroughs were united with the larger towns of Cupar and St. Andrew's, in which form the constituency survives to the present day. Mr Johnston represented it in the first two Reformed Parliaments. With Whig principles, he united strong religious convictions, and both led him to support with ardour the philanthropic measures which followed in quick succession the great Reform Act. This brought him into close connection with such men as Lord Shaftesbury—then Lord Ashley—Dr. Lushington, and especially Mr. (afterwards Sir) Fowell Buxton, to whose eldest daughter he was married on 1st August, 1834, the day of the abolition of slavery throughout the British Empire.

Shortly after this event Mr. Buxton wrote: "I surrendered my vocation, and next to Macaulay my best human helper in it, on the same day, and I am not only well contented, but very happy, and very thankful that she is so bestowed." —Life of Sir Fowell Buxton.

After his marriage, Mr. Johnston remained closely associated with his father-in-law in Parliamentary work until they both lost their seats at the General Election after the death of William IV. in July, 1837.

Two years later Mr. Johnston was appointed manager of the Halesworth Bank with its Branch Banks, and from that time until his death was at the head of most of the movements of a patriotic or philanthropic character in the district. He purchased land just outside the town to provide labourers with allotments. He acquired a building, which he converted into a hall for public meetings; this was afterwards given to the town by his children. He took an active part in the restoration of Halesworth Church, which was completed after his death by public subscription as a tribute to his memory. The Volunteer movement also had his hearty sympathy and support. At the age of sixty-two he took command of the 7th Suffolk Eifle Company, becoming very popular with the members of the corps, some of whom still remember his cheery, "Gentlemen, rendezvous in the Market Place," the march out to Holton Hall, and the hospitable welcome which always greeted them there.

In 1852 Mr. Johnston sustained a great loss in the death of his wife.

The memory of this gifted lady is still cherished in Halesworth, where her ready sympathy, her charities, and the large part which she and her husband bore in the life of that rather quiescent market town, are a well-kept tradition. An infant school was built as a memorial to Mrs. Johnston, and for carrying on work which she had much at heart. A few years after his wife's death Mr. Johnston, who had up to that time resided at the Bank House, purchased Holton Hall, and removed there with his daughters. During Mrs. Johnston's life the summer months were spent by the family at Southwold, then a quiet watering place, and within easy driving distance from Halesworth. Mr. Johnston died in 1862, and was buried at Overstrand, where he had laid his wife ten years before, within the old ruins in the churchyard.

He married Priscilla Buxton, the daughter of Sir Thomas Fowell Buxton, Bt and they had two sons and four daughters. They were parents of MP Andrew Johnston and grandfather of designer Edward Johnston (the son of his younger son Fowell Buxton Johnston).

Parliament of the United Kingdom
Preceded by James Balfour	Member of Parliament for Anstruther Burghs; 1831–1832	Constituency abolished
New constituency	Member of Parliament for St Andrews Burghs; 1832–1837	Succeeded by Edward Ellice
