= Priscilla Buxton =

British abolitionist (1808-1852)

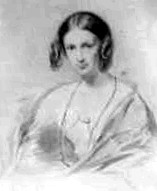
- from the frontispiece of her memoirs
- Born: 25 February 1808; Earlham Hall, Norfolk, England
- Died: 18 June 1852 (aged 44); Halesworth, Suffolk, England
- Other name: Priscilla Johnston
- Occupation: Abolitionist
- Spouse: Andrew Johnston (m. 1834)
- Children: 4, including Andrew Johnston
- Father: Thomas Buxton, 1st Baronet
- Relatives: Edward Johnston (grandson); Sir Edward Buxton, 2nd Baronet (brother); Charles Buxton (brother); Joseph John Gurney (uncle); Elizabeth Fry (aunt); Joseph Fry (uncle); Louisa Gurney Hoare (aunt); Samuel Gurney (uncle); Daniel Gurney (uncle); Samuel Gurney (cousin); John Henry Gurney Sr. (cousin); John Gurney (grandfather)
- Family: Gurney family

Priscilla Buxton (married name Johnston; 25 February 1808 – 18 June 1852) was a British abolitionist and co-secretary of the London Female Anti-Slavery Society. Buxton was the second to sign the 1833 national women's petition against slavery, after Amelia Opie.

== Life ==
Buxton was born on 25 February 1808 at Earlham Hall, Norfolk to Thomas Fowell Buxton (later Sir Thomas Buxton, 1st Baronet), a politician, abolitionist and philanthropist, and Hannah Buxton (née Gurney, later Lady Buxton; 1783–1872), the daughter of the banker John Gurney and member of the Gurney family. Through her mother, Buxton was the niece of the prison reformer Elizabeth Fry, and the bankers Joseph John Gurney, Samuel Gurney and Daniel Gurney. The eldest of eight siblings, of which only four survived to adulthood, Buxton was the sister of the politicians Sir Edward Buxton, 2nd Baronet and Charles Buxton.

Buxton served as her father's special assistant as he led the campaign to end slavery in the British colonies. She also help organise help for educational missionary work in Africa. She and her sister, Anne, were not her father's servants, it was noted that Priscilla not only solved problems but also anticipated them. Her father was surprised when the leading American abolitionist Garrison commented on his letter in "The Liberator". He couldn't recall that it was his daughter who had written it in his name.

In 1832 Buxton became the co-secretary of the London Female Anti-Slavery Society. She would not able to join the Anti-Slavery Society, despite it being part founded by her father as only men were allowed to join. She could hear her father speak in parliament but only on the condition that she heard it via a ventilation shaft. Only voters (and other men) were allowed to spectate in the houses of Parliament. Women could raise petitions and Buxton was one of the first of 187,000 that she helped to organise in 1833 against slavery. The petition took two people to carry it, it was the largest ever abolitionist petition and it was laughed at in parliament.

Buxton married the Scottish politician Andrew Johnston who was an ally of her father. Johnston had stood in the reformed 1832 general election where he became the MP for the St Andrews District of Burghs. They chose to get married on 1 August 1834 which was the day that the majority of slaves in the British Empire were legally freed.

They had four children. They were parents of MP Andrew Johnston and grandfather of designer Edward Johnston (the son of his younger son Fowell Buxton Johnston).

Her husband and her father lost their seats in the 1837 election. She and Andrew went to Fife and then returned south where Andrew took a job in the Gurney's Bank. On 18 June 1852, Buxton died aged 44 in Halesworth, Suffolk.

== Legacy ==
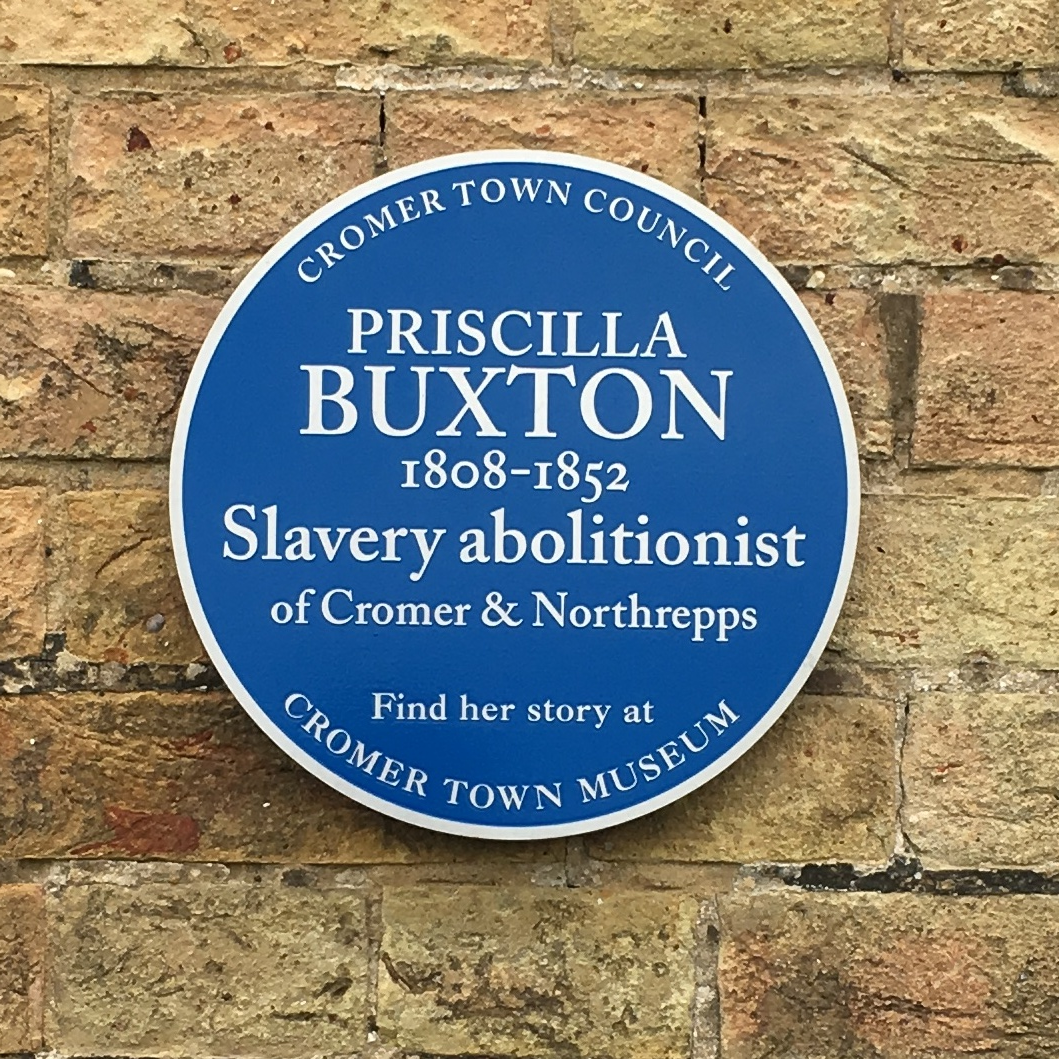
Blue plaque in Cromer

Buxton's journal and letters were posthumously published in 1862. Buxton has a plaque raised by Cromer council which advertises their museum.
