= The Imprint (printing trade periodical) =

London printing trade periodical, 1913 only

The Imprint was a periodical aimed at the printing trade, published in 9 issues from January to November 1913. The publishers were the Imprint Publishing Company, of 11 Henrietta Street, Covent Garden, London. Editors were F. Ernest Jackson, Edward Johnston, J. H. Mason, and Gerard Meynell of the Westminster Press, London, which was also the printer of the journal.

In addition to the editors, several notable printing practitioners wrote for the magazine, including Stanley Morison.

== Subjects covered ==
- typography
- wood engraving
- lithography
- photogravure
- children's books
- 18th-century song books
- liturgical books
- offset machinery
- printers' devices
- printing in Russia
- use of the Linotype machine
- artists including Lucien Pissarro, Paul Gauguin, Honoré Daumier
- copyright

== Issues ==
The issues are dated thus:

=== Volume 1 ===
==== January 1913, 1 ====
- Rev. T. F. Dibdin, "Printers Devices", pages 1–16
- "Notes and Errata", p. IV
- Prof. W. R. Lethaby, "Art and Workmanship", p. 1
- C. D. Medly, "The Law of The Imprint", p. 4
- Edward Johnston, "Decoration and Its Uses", p. 7
- R. A. Austen-Leigh, "The American Way", p. 15
- F. Ernest Jackson, "Lithography", p. 18
- Joseph Pennel, "The Coming Illustration", p. 24
- J. H. Mason, "Trade Teaching and Education", p. 33
- W. Howard Hazell, "Cost Finding and Keeping", p. 39
- Harry A. Maddox, "Paper Selection for Offset & Intaglio Printing", p. 45
- Everard Meynell, "The Plain Dealer", p. 51
- "Book Notices", p. 55
- "The making of The Imprint" p. 70

==== February 17th, 1913, 2 ====
- Rev. T. F. Dibdin, "Printers Devices, Part II", Supplement, pages 17–32
- "Notes", p. iv
- Walter Crane, "My Books for Children", p. 81
- J. H. Mason, "Printing of Children's books", p. 87
- Alice Meynell, H. Belloc, Clarence Rook, Arthur Waugh, Barry Pain, J. P. Collins, Edward Johnston, "The Illustration of Children's Books", p. 95
- William Foster, "Drawing by Birket Foster", p. 105
- Donald Cammeron-Swan, F.R.P.S., "Black and White Drawing for Reproduction", p. 109
- C. D. Medley, "Compulsory American Printing", p. 117
- B. Newdigate, "The Arts & Crafts Exhibition", p. 121
- F. Ernest Jackson, "Lithography, II. Theory", p. 125
- Edward Johnston, "Decoration and Its Uses, II", p. 128
- Everard Meynell, "The Plain Dealer", p. 134
- "Reviews", p. 139
- Cecil. B. Johnson, "The Cost Reference", p. 144
- Daniel T. Powell, "An Up-to-Date Platen", p. 151
- Rev. T. F. Dibdin, "Printers' Devices. Part II"
- "Notes & Reviews, Correspondence", M. E. Sadler, W. H. Fairbairns, G. G. Scotson-Clark, p. 155
- "The Praise of the Press", p. 160

==== March 17, 1913, 3 ====
- Rev. T. F. Dibdin, "Printers Devices, Part III", Supplement, pages 33–40
- Frank Rinder, "Honoré Daumier", p. 161
- F. Ernest Jackson, "Lithography: III. Preparation of the stone", p. 171
- F. Ernest Jackson, "Thomas R. Way: Lithographer, author, painter", p. 179
- Frank A. Mumby, "The house of Macmillan", p. 188
- Campbell Dodgson, "Glad dawn once more", p. 192
- A Master Printer, "Then Honest Men, the printer's bitter cry", p. 193
- Howard Hazell, "The printers' cost congress", p. 197
- Edward Johnston, "Decoration and its uses, Chapter III. The development of types, and Formal Writing with the Broad-nibbed Pen (continued)", p. 201
- Everard Meynell, "The plain dealer: III. Remainders", p. 206
- J. H. Mason, "Reviews", p. 208
  - "Biblion a-Biblion"
  - "Penmanship of the XVI, XVII, and the XVIIIth Centuries. A series of typical examples from English and foreign writing books", directed by Lewis F. Day
  - "Idylls of the year. By Basil Anderton M.A., Four illustrations in Colour Photogravure"
  - "Thomas A Kempis Calendar for the year of our Lord 1913"
- Daniel T. Powell, "Offset and Offsetmachinery", p. 212
- "Correspondence", W. Howard Hazell, T. Edward Jones, Geo. Bridges, p. 225
- "A Prize for Printers and Designers" p. 229

==== April 17, 1913, 4 ====
- Jane Taylor & Ann Taylor with drawings by Rachel Marchall: "The Vulgar Little Lady"
- "Notes", p. iii & iv
- Arthur M. Hind, "The woodcut portraits of Jan Lievens and Dirk de Bray", p. 233
- J. B. Manson, "Notes on some wood-engravings of Lucien Pissarro". p. 240
- H. G. Webb, Noel Rooke, Jacques Beltrand & F. Ernest Jackson, "Wood-engravings" p. 248
- Edward Johnston, "Decoration & its uses, Chapter IV", p. 252
- W. B. Dingley, "The Value of the Shop Window", p. 257
- Everard Meynell, "The plain dealer: IV. Woodcuts", p. 261
- H. C., "Colour Printing", p. 263
- E. A., "Linotype Troubles: some Cures & Remedies", p. 266
- Daniel T. Powell, "Two more Platens, the "Victoria" and the 'Falcon'", p. 272
- "Reviews" p. 280
  - Cataloque of Pictures, Drawings and Engravings, Autograph Letters, and MSS., Books, and Works of Art, the property of R. W. Barrett Browning Esq. (Deceased)
  - The constructive Quarterly: A Journal of the Faith, Work and Thoughts of Christendom, Herny Frowde
  - Bacon's Large Scale Atlas of London and Suburbs
  - Bacon's Essays, edited by Sydney Humphries
- The value of good illustrating, p. 283
- "Notes, correspondence, reviews", p. 291
  - W. H. Fairbanks, "Black and White", J. O. Fordie
- Rev. T. F. Dibdin, "Printers' Devices, Part IV", Supplement pages 41–48

==== May 17, 1913, 5 ====
- J. H. Mason, "A Brief Sketch of the History of Wood-Engraving", p. 297
- A. S.Hartrick, A.R.W.S.: "Post-Impressionism, with some personal recollections of Vincent van Gogh and Paul Gauguin", p. 305
- F. Ernest Jackson, "Lithography: IV. Drawing Materials", p. 319
- C. D. Medley, "Printers Lien", p. 321
- Joseph Thorp, "Trifling with the Code", p. 324
- William Maas, "Some Eighteenth Century Song Books", p. 327
- Edward Johnston, "Decoration and Its Uses", p. 345
- A Master Printer: "Ten Honest Men", p. 353
- Everard Meynell, "The Plain Dealer, a Browning Retrospect", p. 356
- Daniel T. Powell, "Intaglio Photogravure Printing", p. 359
- "Correspondence", p. 367
  - Richard Wilson, "Black and White"
- "New Patents": "Intaglio Printing", "Rotary Offset Lithography Printing Presses", p. 375
- G. H. Rayner, "Notes on the Future of Printing", p. 377
- Rev. T. F. Dibdin, "Printers Devices, Part V", Supplement, pages 49–56

==== June 17, 1913, 6 ====
- "Editors, Notices, Contents, Index to Advertisers", p. i & ii
- "Notes", p. iii & iv
- "The Right Hon. Russell Gurney, Q.C.", George Frederick Watts, R.A. (1817–1904). National Gallery No. 1654. Anglogravure printed by the Anglo-Engraving Compagny, Milford Lane, Strand, WC. p. 379
- "Portrait of Russell Gurney", p. 380
- Donald Cameron-Swan, F.R.P.S., "Pioneers of Photogravure", p. 381
- "Portrait of Herr Klìk of Vienna", director of The Rembrandt Intaglio Printing Co., p. 385,386
- "Portrait of Ariosto", Forman Gravure, Titian, p. 388
- "Portrait of St. Thomas Aquinas, (1226–1274)", Formangravure by Thomas Forman and Sons, Nottingham, p. 402–403
- Typoclastes, "Plea for reform of printing", p. 391
- J. Arthur Hill, "Old books & their printers", p. 405
- T. Edwards Jones, "Edward Arber, F.S.A.", p. 411
- Everard Meynell, "The plain dealer: VI. Signs and Posters", p. 416
- "Reviews": J. H. Mason: The Book Pretentious and Other Reviews, p. 419
  - Dame Fashion by Julius M. Price, p,419
  - The Baxter Yearbook, p. 420
  - Craft, an Informal Monthly, February, Vol. 1, no. 1, W. H, Smith & Son, p. 421
  - The American Printer, March, 1913 Vol. 56, no. 1, p. 420
  - The Works of Francis Thompson, p. 424
- Edward Johnston, Decoration & its uses, Chapter IV. Special arrangement of letters-the Book: Formal writing with the broad-nibbed pen, p. 428
- Daniel T. Powell, The Hodgman Press, p. 431
- Geo. H. Rayner, R.P.A., Printing & Patents, p. 439
  - Intaglio Printing, Wiping Apparatus for
- Rev. T. F. Dibdin, Printers' devices. Part VI., pages 57–64
- Reviews, Notes and Correspondence,

=== Volume 2 ===
==== July 17, 1913, 7 ====
Reproductions by Photogravure and Offset

- Index To Volume One: January to June, 1913, pp[. iii–xv
- Editors, Notices, Contents, Index to Advertisers, p. i & ii
- J. H. Mason, Notes
- F. Ernest Jackson, Original Lithography of Walter Howard Hazell
- R. A. Austen-Leigh, An Appreciation, p. 9
- Alex. Bakshy, Art and Printing in Russia , p. 10
- J. H. Mason, Letters and Language, p. 18
- Everard Meynell, The Plain Dealer, VII, p. 27
- Harry A. Maddox, The Offset Method of Printing, p. 30
- Correspondence
  - J. W. Frings, Reform of Atavism, p. 39
  - John Place, Dave Silve, p. 44
- Stanley A. Morrison, Notes on Some Liturgical Books, p. 48
- Harold Monro, Broadsides, p. 61
- Daniel T. Powell, The Inking of the Forme,
- Patents: Two important Specifications of the Month
- Rev. T. F. Dibdin, Printers' Devices Part VII., pages 65–72
- Edited by J. H. Mason
- Reviews and Correspondence

==== August 27, 1913, 8 ====
- Stanley A. Morison, Notes on Some Liturgical Books
- Harold Monro, Broadsides
- C. D. Medley, The Copyright Act , p. 74
- Edward Johnston, Decoration and its Uses, Chapter VII, Special arrangement of Letters-the Book (continued) (formal writing with the broad-nibbed pen—continued) , p. 79
- J. H. Mason, Reviews
  - Manchester Playgoer, New Series
  - The Mask, a quarterly journal of the art of the theater
  - Monotype Recorder, May, 1913
  - Patents, Rayner $ Co
  - The American Printer, July
  - Sharaton Cover Papers
  - Income tax simplified
  - The business of Bookbanding
- Everard Meynell, The Plain Dealer, VIII, "A continual Slight Novelty", p. 89
- Daniel T. Powell, A Perfecting Machine
- G. H. Rayner, R.P.A., Printing and Patents
- Rev. T. F. Dibdin, Printers' Devices. Part VIII, pages 73–80
- Edited by J. H. Mason
- Correspondence

==== November 27, 1913, 9 ====
- J. H. Mason, Type sizes: I. The Old British Bodies, p. 99
- Poster advertising on the Underground, p. 109
- A. E. Goodwing, Technical instruction in printing and the costin educational campaign, p. 119
- J. H. Mason, Reviews, p. 121
  - A living theatre by Gordon Graig
  - Modern Practical Design by G. Woolliscroft Rhead
  - An illustrated Cataloque of remarkable Incunabula
  - Prints and their makers
  - William Morris, A study in Personality, by Arthur Compton-Rickett
  - The production of the printed cataloque, by Alex. J. Philip
  - The Fellowship Books
- Correspondence, p. 131
  - E. R. Currier, T. Edward Jones,
- The Selfridge competition, p. 133
- Fry's trade Mark competition, p. 141
- Rev. T. F. Dibdin, Printers' Devices. Part IX, pages 81–88

== Imprint Old Face ==
The name of the journal lives on in the typeface Imprint Old Face. This sturdy design, Caslon—like but with more regularity in its letterforms, was produced for the magazine (on a non-exclusive basis) in 1912 by the Monotype Company as Series 101 for automatic composition on the Monotype caster. When delivered to the journal's printers on December 31, 1912, it was still incomplete — the accents had not yet been made — so the editors asked in the first issue: “Will readers kindly insert them for themselves, if they find their omission harsh? For ourselves, we rather like the fine careless flavour, which their omission gives, after we have recovered from the first shock inevitable to us typographical precisians”.

Perhaps Imprint’s most notable use since then has been for the entire setting of the Second Edition of the Oxford English Dictionary (1989), 22,000 pages of precisely structured typography in 20 volumes.

It is available today as a digital OpenType font from Monotype's successor, Monotype Imaging.

== Reprint of the number one issue ==
In 1972 the January Number One issue was reprinted at The Curwen Press for the members of The Wynkyn De Worde Society. An introduction to this edition was added by Francis Meynell.
