= Buxton baronets of Belfield (1840) =

Escutcheon of the Buxton baronets of Belfield

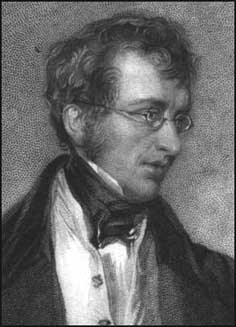
Sir Thomas Buxton, 1st Baronet

The Buxton baronetcy, of Belfield in the County of Dorset was created in the Baronetage of the United Kingdom on 30 July 1840 for the brewer, politician and social reformer Thomas Buxton. He was Member of Parliament for Weymouth and Melcombe Regis from 1818 to 1837.

His eldest son Edward, the 2nd Baronet, represented Essex South and Norfolk East in Parliament. His son Thomas, the 3rd Baronet, was Governor of South Australia between 1895 and 1899.

== Buxton baronets, of Belfield (1840) ==
- Sir Thomas Fowell Buxton, 1st Baronet (1786–1845)
- Sir Edward North Buxton, 2nd Baronet (1812–1858)
- Sir Thomas Fowell Buxton, 3rd Baronet, GCMG (1837–1915)
- Sir Thomas Fowell Victor Buxton, 4th Baronet (1865–1919)
- Sir Thomas Buxton, 5th Baronet (1889–1945)
- Sir Thomas Fowell Victor Buxton, 6th Baronet (1925–1996)
- Sir Jocelyn Charles Roden Buxton, 7th Baronet (1924–2014)
- Sir Crispin Charles Gerard Buxton, 8th Baronet (born 1958), married with one son.

== Extended family ==
- Sydney Buxton, 1st Earl Buxton was the son of Charles Buxton, third son of the 1st Baronet.
- Noel Noel-Buxton, 1st Baron Noel-Buxton was the second son of the 3rd Baronet.
- Aubrey Buxton, Baron Buxton of Alsa was the son of Leland William Wilberforce Buxton (1884–1967), youngest son of the 3rd Baronet.
