= Travers Buxton =

English anti-slavery activist

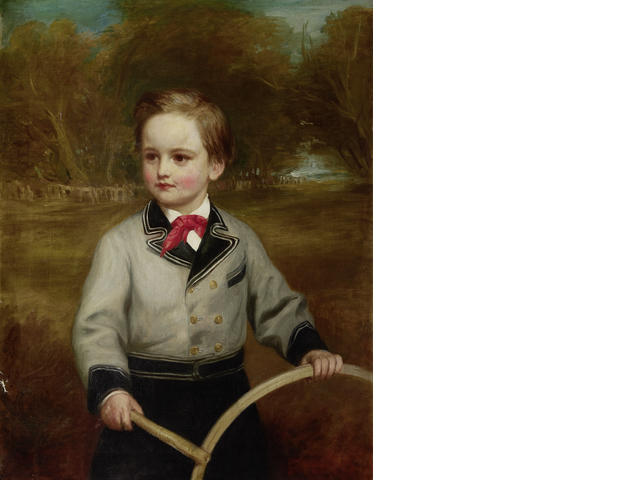
Portrait of Travers Buxton Jr. in 1871 by Eden Upton Eddis

Travers Buxton (1865–1945) was an English anti-slavery activist.

== Early life ==
Travers was a member of the Buxton family which had been involved in abolitionism in the United Kingdom for several generations. Thomas Fowell Buxton had been a founder of the British and Foreign Anti-Slavery Society. His grandson, also called Thomas Fowell Buxton was president of the society in 1901.

== Anti-slavery work ==
Travers became secretary of the British and Foreign Anti-Slavery Society (ASS) in 1898. He was the Society's representative to the campaign against Leopold II's Congo Free State. In 1909 when the ASS merged with the Aborigines Protection Society he became secretary of the new organisation.

In 1921, W.E.B. Du Bois invited Travers to organise the 2nd Pan-African Congress.

== Publications ==
- William Wilberforce, The Story of the Great Crusade, 1900
- British East Africa back to slavery: An appeal to the Rt. Hon. Lewis Harcourt, 1914
