= Sir Jocelyn Charles Roden Buxton, 7th Baronet =

Jocelyn Charles Roden Buxton (known as "Jocky"), 7th Baronet (8 August 1924 – 25 April 2014), was born in London the son of Captain RHV Buxton, RN, and Dorothy Alina St. John.

== Career ==
=== Military service ===
He was brought up at Romsey, Hampshire, and educated at Eton, thereafter joining the Royal Navy’s Fleet Air Arm in 1942 and after training posted as a fighter pilot to the aircraft carrier Campania which was on duty on the Arctic Run protecting the vital supplies that were being shipped to northern Russia.

After the war, he continued military service as a member of the Royal Naval Volunteer Reserve (RNVR), gained a private pilot's licence and joined the Uganda Company flying aircraft principally to Kampala where he much enjoyed sailing on Lake Victoria.

During the Korean War, Sir Jocelyn volunteered for active service and in 1953 was one of the first RNVR pilots to establish himself as a regular squadron pilot serving aboard the carriers Ocean and Glory.

=== Post-war career ===
After the war, he settled in the Sudan where he advised on several construction projects. In 1969 he returned to England to qualify as an airline pilot flying scheduled passengers on British Island Airways routes to the Channel Islands. His last role was for Channel Express based in Bournemouth. He succeeded as the 7th Baronet Buxton, of Belfield, co. Dorset and Runton, co. Norfolk on 14 November 1996.

Sir Jocelyn continued to fly in retirement. He was also a vice patron of the charity the Waveney Stardust which promotes cruising for the disabled, and remained a strong supporter of the Royal Navy and the Fleet Air Arm.

== Personal life ==
Sir Jocelyn married Ann Frances Smitherman, daughter of the British Consul in Khartoum on 3 June 1960. He died on 25 April 2014 at age 89. They were the parents of three daughters.

The title passed to Sir Crispin Charles Gerard Buxton, 8th Baronet, the son of Sir Jocelyn's younger brother, Lieutenant-Commander Gerard Buxton.
