= Francis Ernest Jackson =

British painter, draughtsman, poster designer and lithographer

- Born: Francis Ernest Jackson; 15 August 1872; Huddersfield, United Kingdom
- Died: 11 March 1945 (aged 72); Oxford, UK
- Known for: Painting

Francis Ernest Jackson ARA (15 August 1872 – 11 March 1945) was a British painter, draughtsman, poster designer and lithographer.

== Background ==
Francis Ernest Jackson was born on 15 August 1872 in Huddersfield, the son of a printer. He was apprenticed as a lithographer, and later attended life-drawing classes at the Yorkshire College. He then studied in Paris at the Académie Julian and the École des Beaux-Arts under Bouguereau, Ferrier, J.-P. Laurens and Constant.

On his return to Britain he designed posters and practised lithography. He began teaching the skill at London County Council schools including Bolt Court, Camberwell, Croydon and Chelsea, before William Lethaby invited him to join the staff at the Central School of Art and Design in 1902. In 1907 he became a co-founder of The Neolith and a founding member of the Senefelder Club, as well as starting the lithograph journal "The Imprint" in 1913 with fellow tutors Edward Johnston, J.H. Mason and publisher Gerard Meynell.

In 1913, Jackson convinced Frank Pick, then advertising manager at the Underground Electric Railways Company of London to commission Senefelder Club members could produce posters for the Underground. Pick accepted his idea and between 1913 and 1925 Jackson designed posters for the London Underground. In addition, throughout the First World War, he was in charge of propaganda lithography for the Ministry of Information.

In 1921, Jackson left the Central School to become the Professor of Drawing at the Royal Academy Schools under Charles Sims. Jackson was elected as the Master of the Art Workers' Guild in 1928. In 1926 he became principal of the Byam Shaw School of Art, a role he held until the start of World War II when the school was closed. He was employed during the war by the Ministry of Information and the Admiralty to draw portraits of war heroes.

In 1944 he was elected an Associate of the Royal Academy.

He died at Oxford on 11 March 1945, from injuries sustained after he was knocked down by a motorcycle.

A memorial exhibition to Jackson was held at the Beaux Arts Gallery in 1946. A memorial to him lies in St James's Church, Piccadilly.

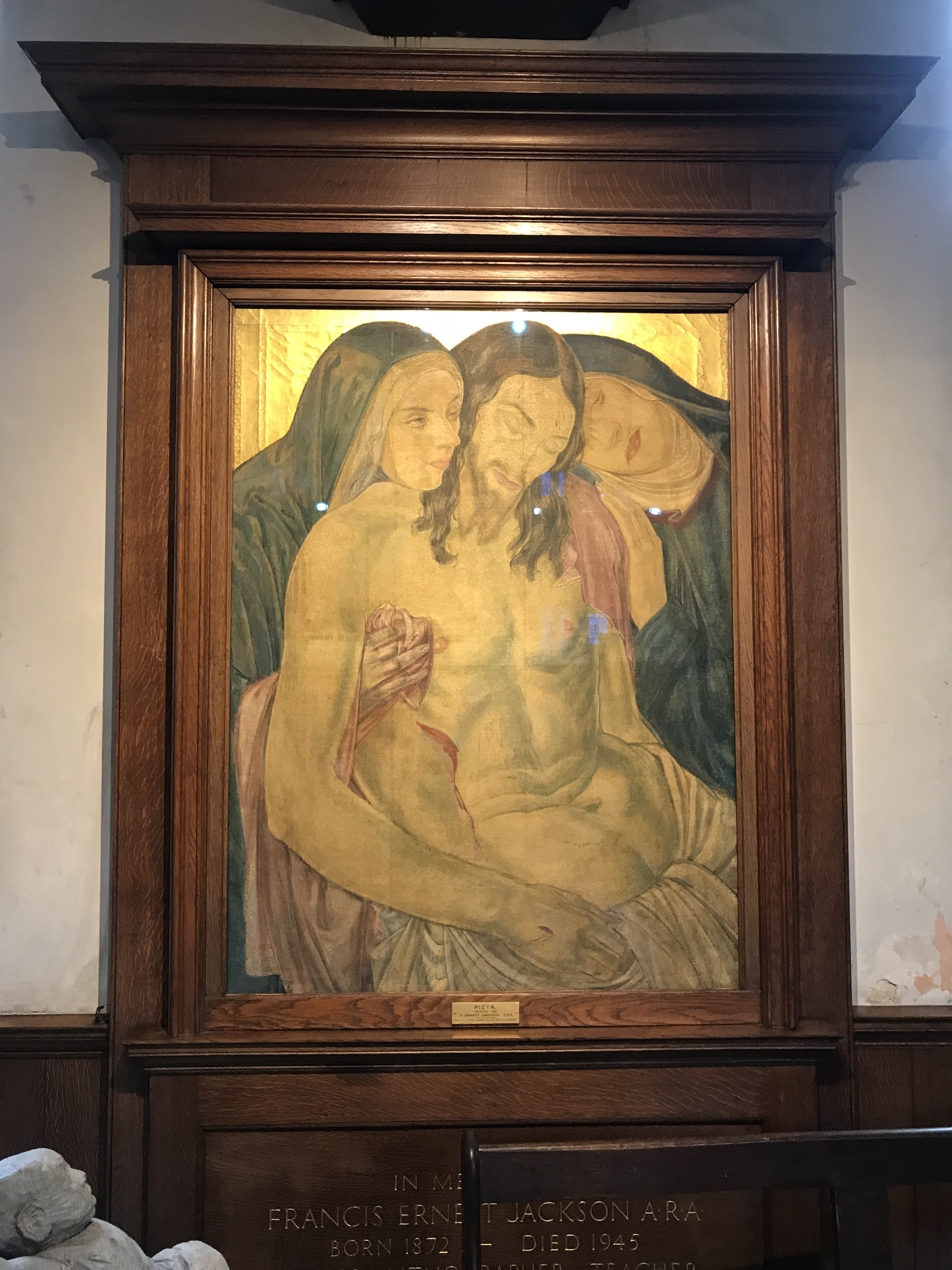
A memorial to Francis Ernest Jackson in St James's Church, Piccadilly.

== Philosophy of Art ==
Discussing his influence on him, the former painter Lancelot Glasson wrote in 1947 that "his thoughts on Art, and on Life, of which he deemed Art to the expression, were based, not on abstract thinking nor on his own more than ordinary erudition, but on that understanding which the daily practice of a craft gives to man." He himself believed unity to be the first quality of any picture, in which the simplest conception will be found always to be the most beautiful. Reality and art were not connected, but running in parallel one unto the other, and therefore in the final conception of the painting there ought to be no instant of accident, as though nature itself were allowed a role in the process.
