= Belfield House =

18th-century house in Weymouth, England

Coordinates: 50.59973°N 2.47107°W

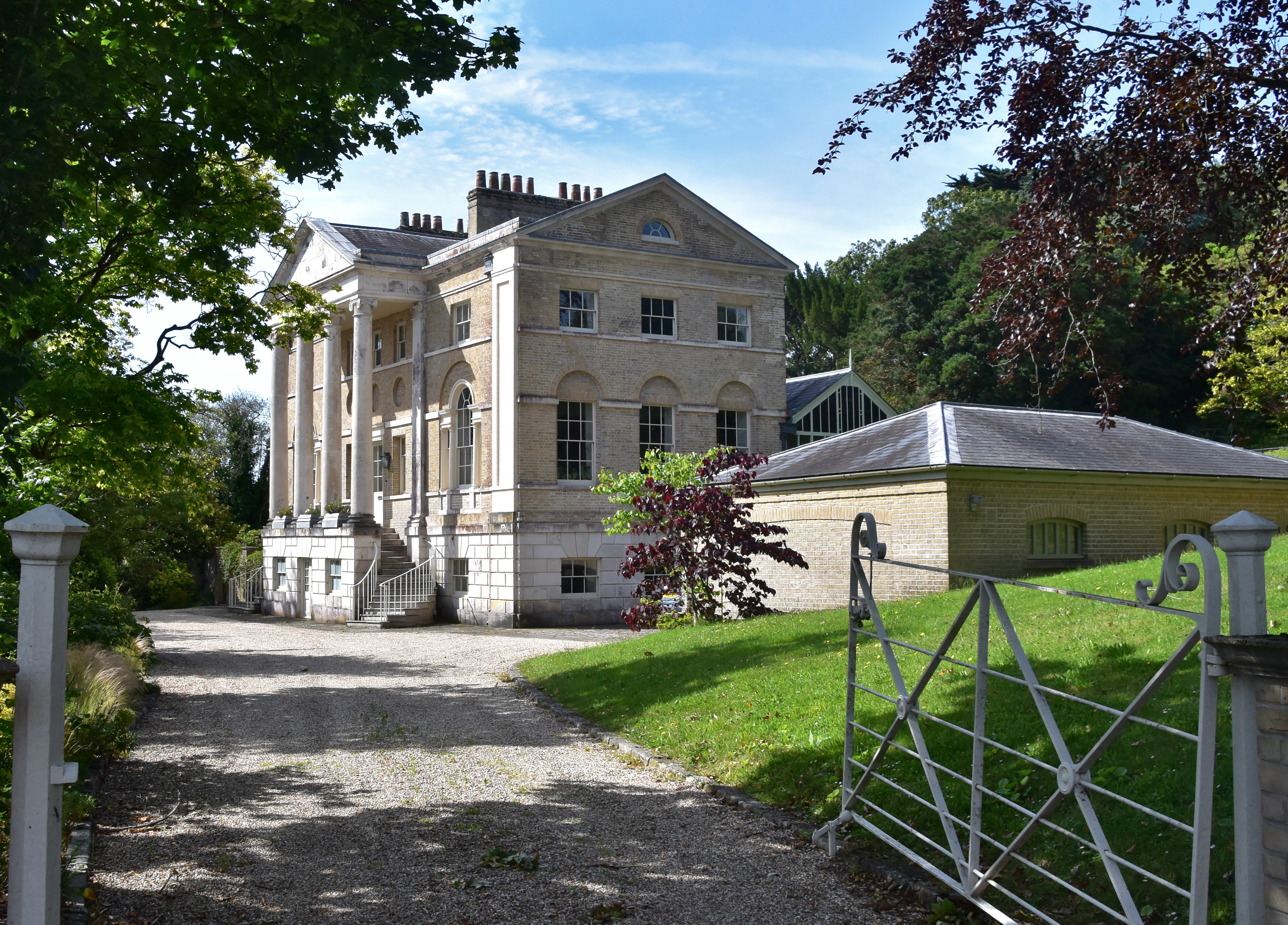
Belfield House

Belfield House is an 18th-century country house, located in Wyke Regis, Weymouth, Dorset, England. Built around 1775–80 of stone and yellow brick in a late classical design, the house has four Ionic columns at its entrance. It originally had its own extensive parkland of thirteen acres, but much of it was built over during 20th-century development.

Belfield House became a Grade II* listed building in 1953. Belfield's former coach-house and stables have also been Grade II listed since 1974. They have now been converted into three residences.

== History ==
Belfield House was built around 1775–80 for Isaac Buxton and his wife. It was designed by John Crunden. Buxton's grandchild was the MP and social reformer Thomas Fowell Buxton, who spent time at Belfield House during his childhood. He later became the MP for Weymouth and Melcombe Regis in 1818, and the owner of Belfield House. During the early 19th century, the drawing room and south-east front were reconstructed, as was the conservatory in the late 19th century.

The house remained in the ownership of the Buxton family until the middle of the 19th century. By the beginning of the 20th century, Connaught House, originally known as Portmore, had been built within Belfield's grounds as a school. Further parts of the grounds were sold throughout the 20th century, with many detached houses being constructed.

In 2004, the house was sold to new owners Colin Grove and Jan Biggs, who then embarked on a major restoration project from 2005. The work was carried out by architects John Stark & Crickmay Partnership and builders R. Moulding & Co. Some of the work included restoration of the exterior detailing, full re-roofing, and timber repairs. Upon completion, the restoration received the Weymouth Civic Society Award for 2010. The society described the house as being "probably Weymouth's finest and most important Georgian house".
