= Edward Johnston =

Uruguayan-born British craftsman, calligrapher and typographer

Edward Johnston CBE
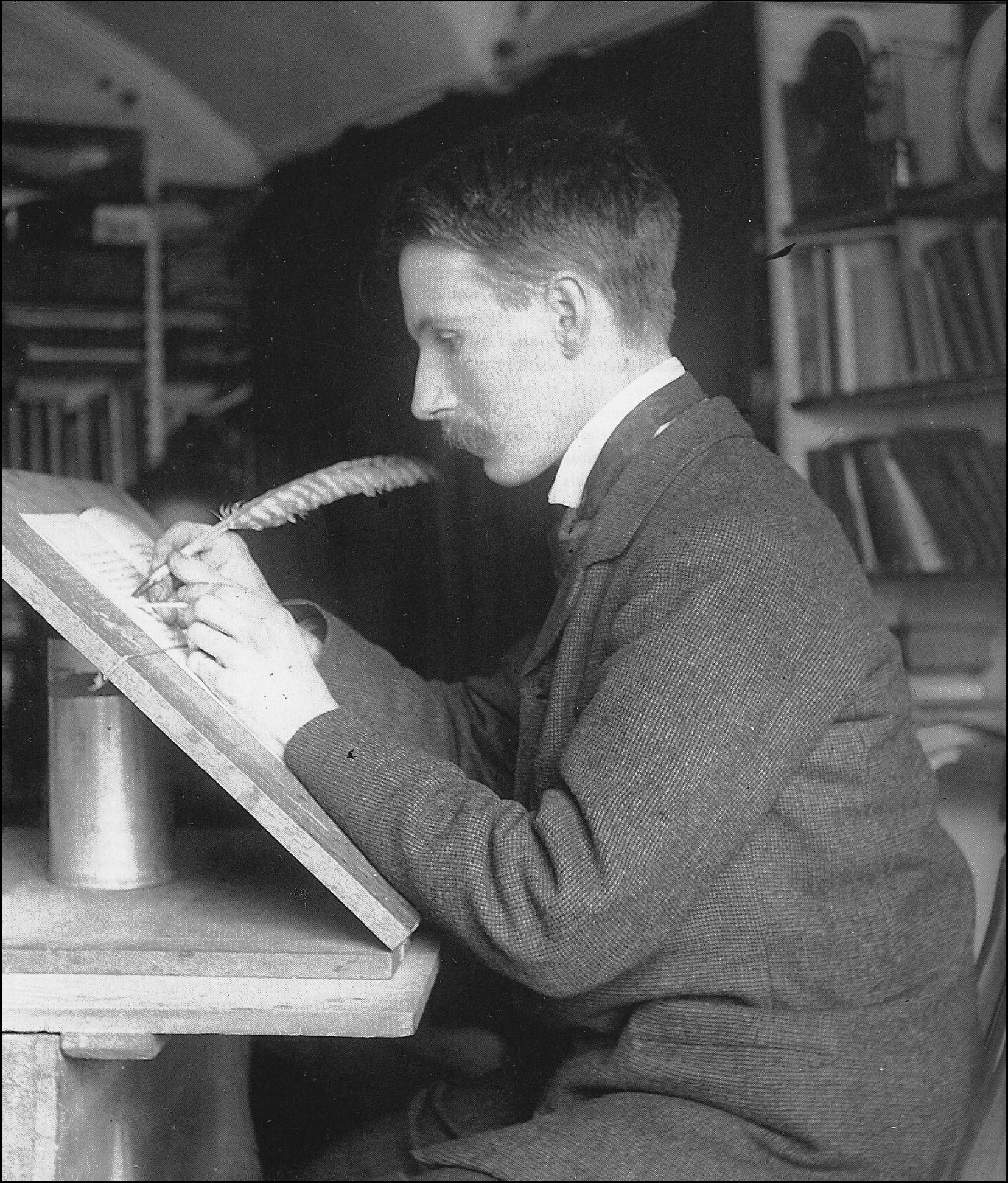
- Johnston in 1902
- Born: 11 February 1872; Arazatí, San José, Uruguay
- Died: 26 November 1944 (aged 72); Ditchling, England
- Education: University of Edinburgh (didn't graduate)
- Occupations: Calligrapher; lettering designer; educator
- Known for: Johnston typeface, corporate identity of the London Underground
- Spouse: Greta Johnston (m. 1903; died 1936)
- Children: 3
- Relatives: Andrew Johnston (uncle); Priscilla Buxton (grandmother); Andrew Johnston (grandfather); Thomas Buxton, 1st Baronet (great-grandfather)
- Family: Gurney family
- Writing career
- Notable works: Writing & Illuminating, & Lettering (1906)

Edward Johnston CBE (11 February 1872 – 26 November 1944) was a Uruguayan-born British calligrapher, lettering designer and educator, known for being the creator of the Johnston typeface and the designer of the corporate identity of the London Underground. Johnston was considered by Rudolf Koch to be the father of modern calligraphy.

== Early life ==
Johnston was born on 11 February 1872 in Arazatí, San José to British parents Fowell Buxton Johnston (born 1839), an army officer and member of the Gurney family, and Alice Johnston (née Douglas; died 1891). Through his father, Johnston was the grandson of the abolitionist Priscilla Buxton and the politician and abolitionist Andrew Johnston, and the nephew of the Liberal Party politician Andrew Johnston. He was the second of four siblings. The family returned to England in 1875.

With his father seeking work, and his mother ill, Johnston was raised by an aunt. He was educated at home, and enjoyed mathematics, technology, and creating illuminated manuscripts. His mother died in 1891, and he began to work for an uncle. He spent some time studying medicine at Edinburgh University but did not complete the course.

After his mother's death, his father was remarried, to a sister of Robert Chalmers, 1st Baron Chalmers. Johnston's half-brother, Andrew Johnston (1897–1917), was killed when his aeroplane crashed while serving in the Royal Flying Corps in the First World War.

== Career ==
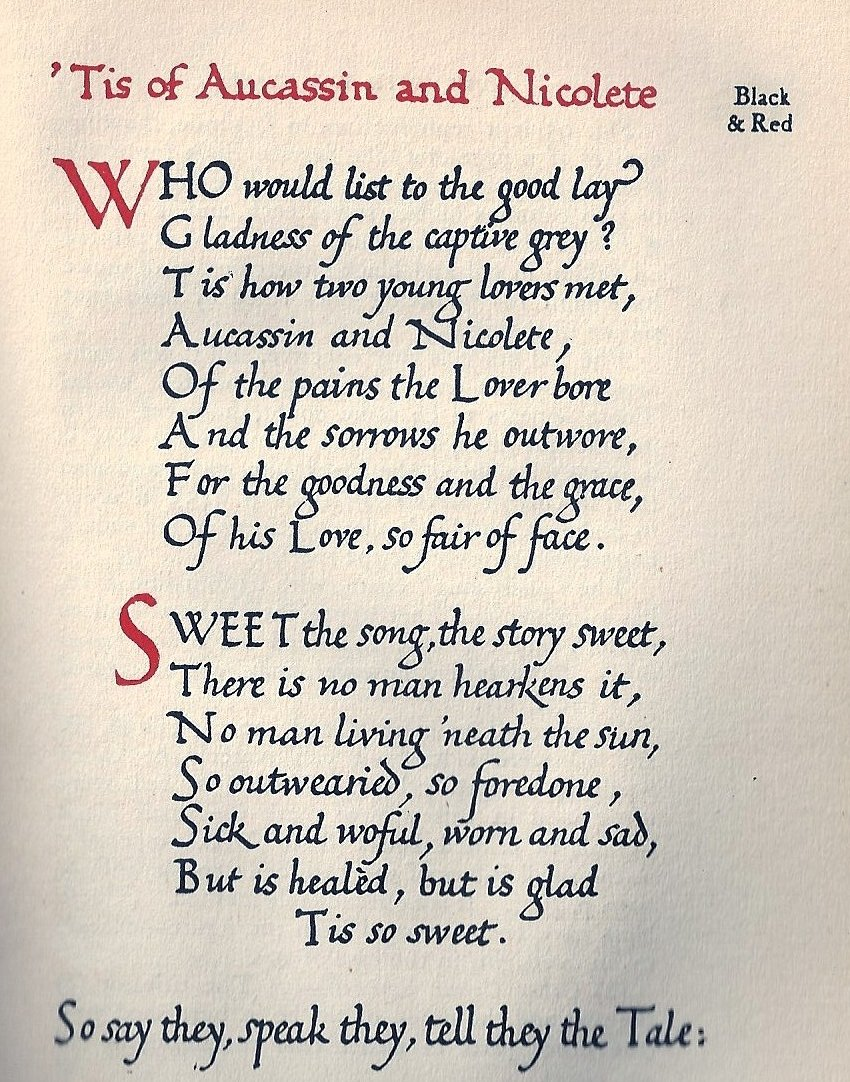
Edward Johnston's calligraphy, shown in the 1906 book Writing & Illuminating & Lettering.

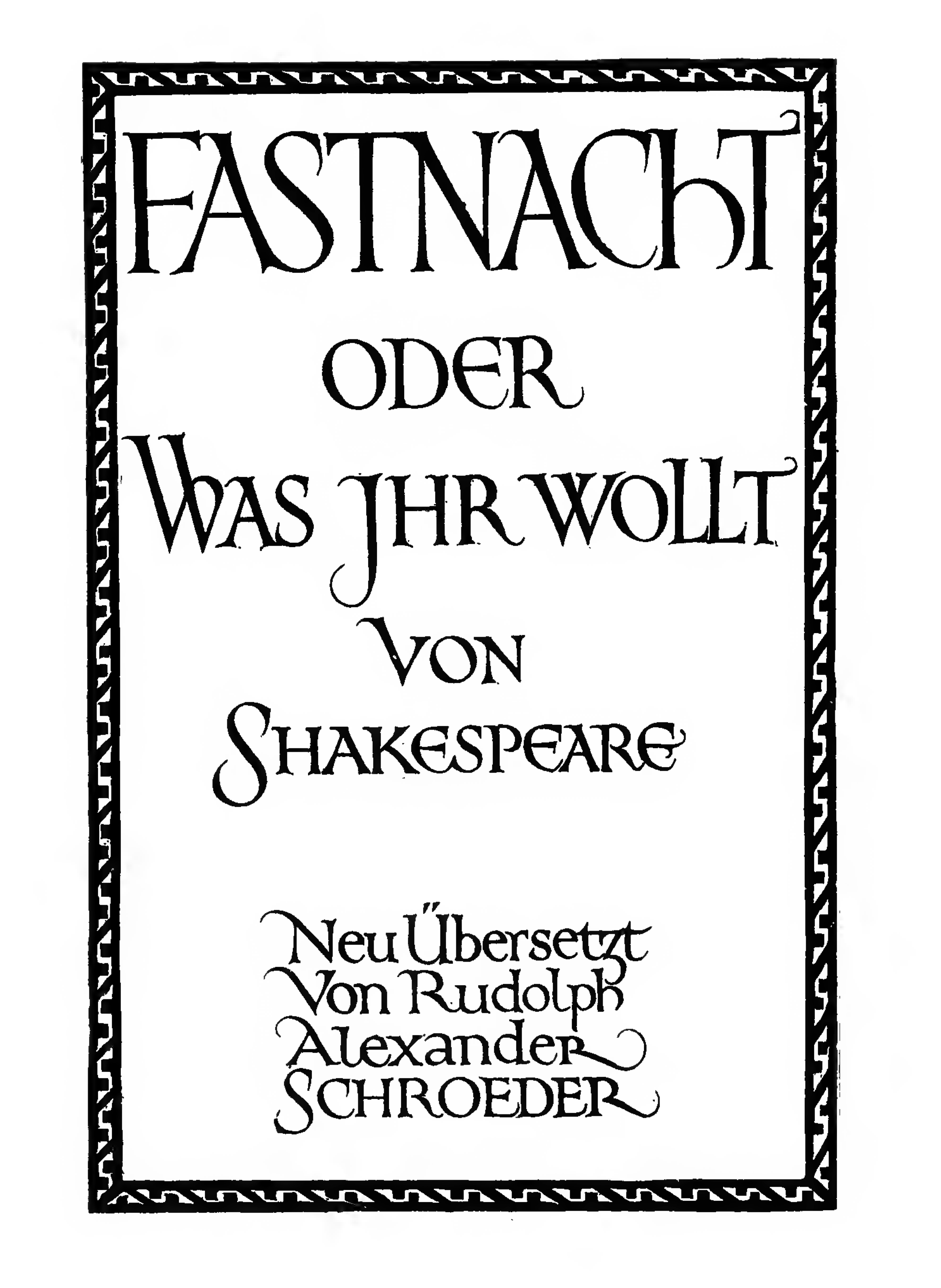
Title page for a German edition of Twelfth Night. It was cut into wood by Johnston's colleague Noel Rooke.

After studying published copies of manuscripts by architect William Harrison Cowlishaw, and a handbook by Edward F. Strange, he was introduced to Cowlishaw in 1898 and then to William Lethaby, principal of the Central School of Arts and Crafts. Lethaby advised him to study manuscripts at the British Museum, which encouraged Johnston to make his letters using a broad edged pen.

Lethaby also engaged Johnston to teach lettering, and he started teaching at the Central School in Southampton Row, London, in September 1899, where he influenced the typeface designer and sculptor Eric Gill. From 1901 he also taught a class at the Royal College of Art and many students were inspired by his teachings.

He published a handbook, Writing & Illuminating, & Lettering in 1906. He started a second book in the 1920s but it was unfinished at his death.

In 1913, Frank Pick commissioned him to design a typeface for London Underground, and the simple and clear sans-serif Johnston typeface was the result. He also redesigned the famous roundel symbol used throughout the system.

In 1913, Johnston was one of the editors of The Imprint, a periodical for the printing industry. For this paper, Monotype made a complete new font: Imprint, series 101, exclusively for use in The Imprint. Actually this was the first revival character font Monotype made. In the 9 issues of The Imprint, many articles about calligraphy were included.

He has also been credited for reviving the art of modern penmanship and lettering single-handedly through his books and teachings. Johnston also devised the simply crafted round calligraphic handwriting style, written with a broad pen, known today as the foundational hand (what Johnston originally called a slanted pen hand, which was developed from Roman and half-uncial forms).

He influenced a generation of British typographers and calligraphers, including Graily Hewitt, Irene Wellington, Harold Curwen and Stanley Morison, Alfred Fairbank, Florence Kingsford Cockerell, Eric Gill and Percy Delf Smith. He also influenced the transition from Gothic to Roman letters in Germany, and Anna Simons was a student. He also lectured in Dresden in 1912. In 1921, students of Johnston founded the Society of Scribes & Illuminators (SSI), probably the world's foremost calligraphy society.

Not all his students were happy with his decision to create a sans-serif design for the Underground, in a style thought of as modernist and industrial. His pupil Graily Hewitt privately wrote to a friend:

In Johnston I have lost confidence. Despite all he did for us...he has undone too much by forsaking his standard of the Roman alphabet, giving the world, without safeguard or explanation, his block letters which disfigure our modern life. His prestige has obscured their vulgarity and commercialism.

Johnston also created a blackletter-influenced design for a 1929 German edition of Hamlet.

In 1959, Evelyn Waugh wrote in the Spectator, "Every schoolboy who learns the italic script, every townsman who reads the announcements of the Underground railway, everyone who studies the maps attached to modern travel books is seeing in the light of Johnston."

== Personal life ==
He met Greta Grieg, a Scottish schoolmistress, in 1900, and they were married in 1903. They had three daughters. They lived in London until moving, in 1912, to Ditchling, Sussex, where Eric Gill had settled in 1907. His wife died in 1936. He was appointed a CBE in 1939. He died at home in Ditchling, and is buried in St Margaret's churchyard.

== Edward Johnston Memorial in Farringdon Station ==
A memorial to Johnston was unveiled in 2019 at Farringdon Station. Designed by Fraser Muggeridge, it is dedicated to both Johnston and his underground alphabet. Compared to both signage and sculpture, the memorial is huge wood type mounted on the wall of the underground station at street level.

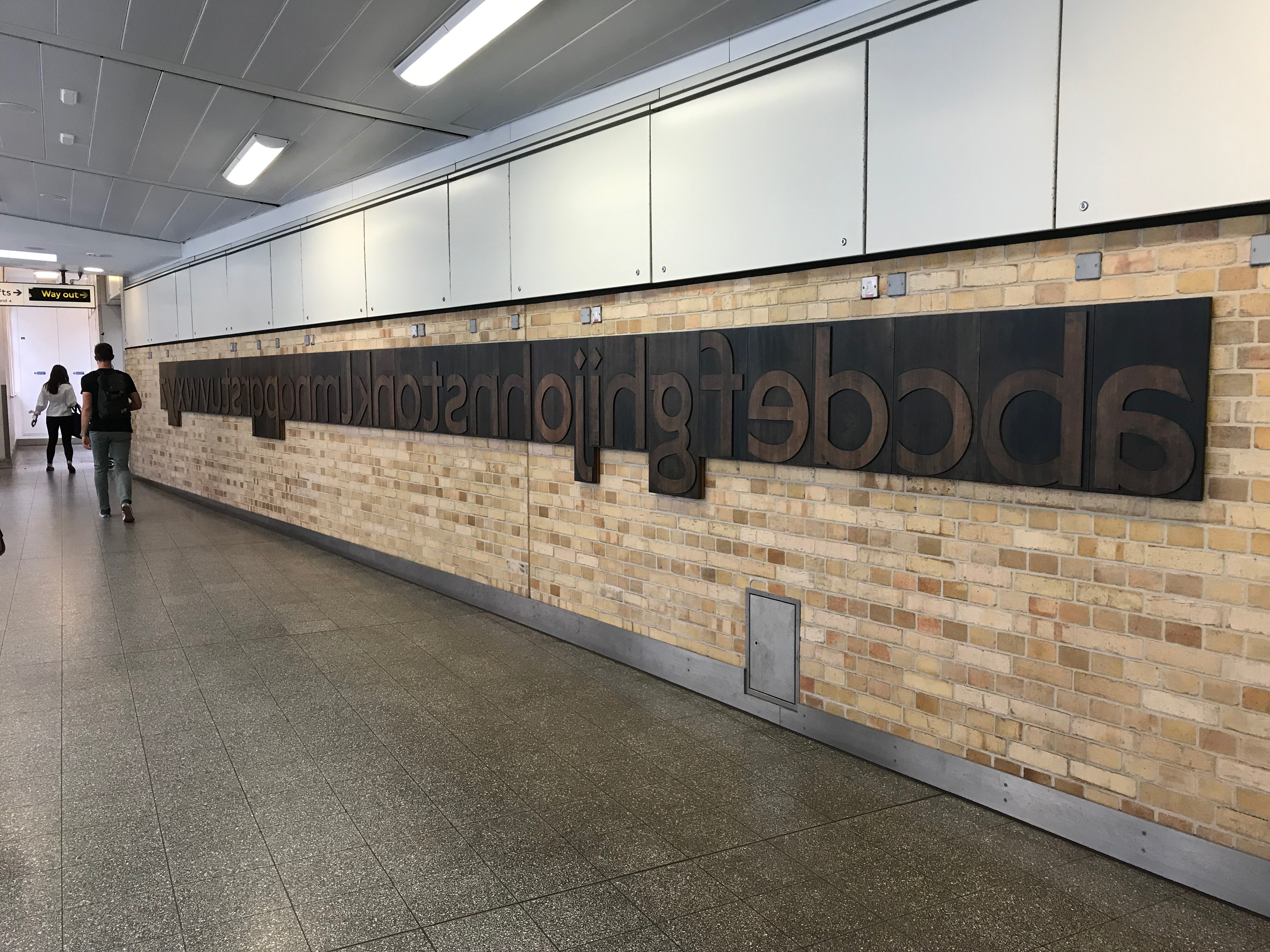
Edward Johnston Memorial

== Publications ==
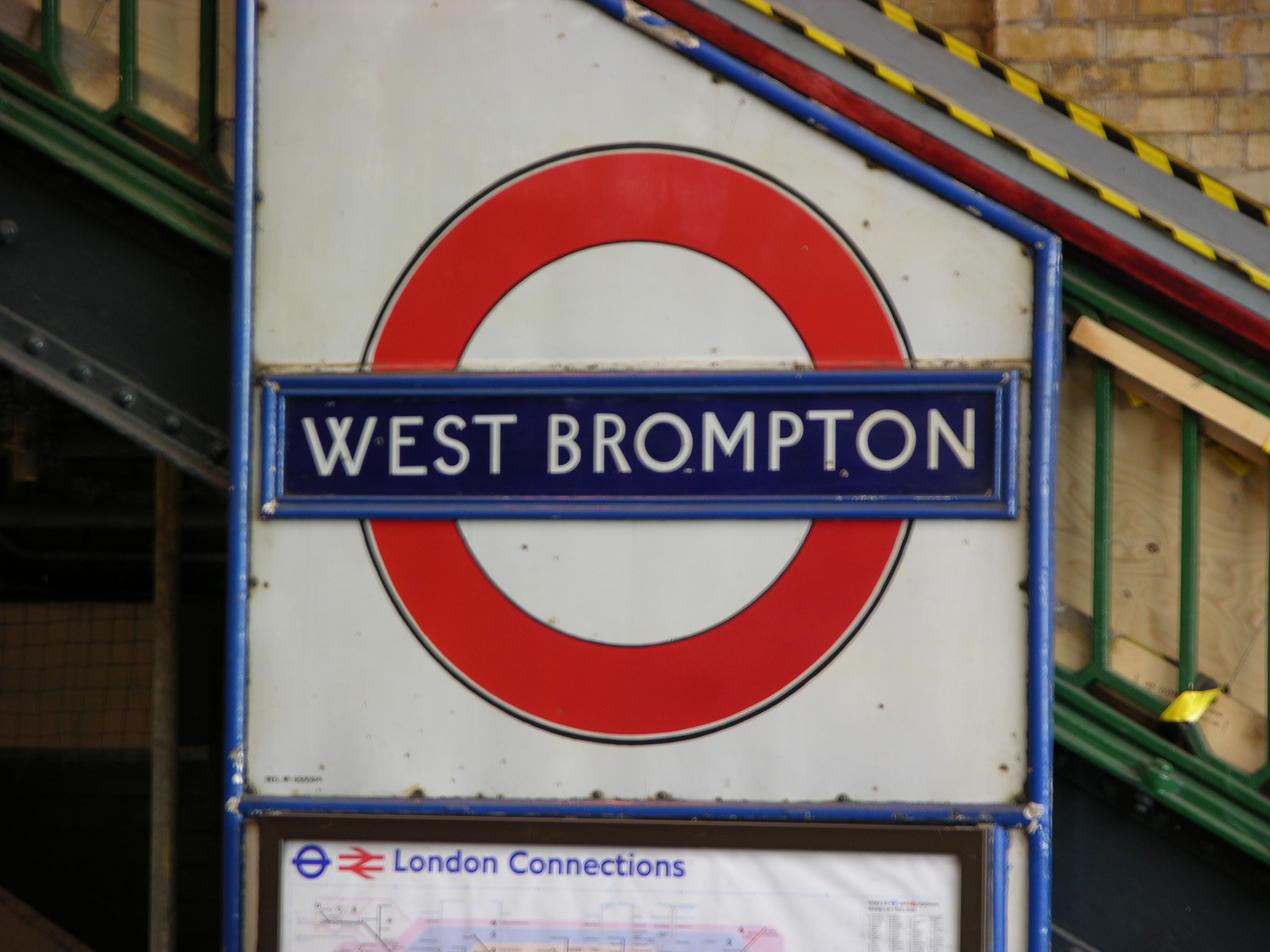
An early sign showing Johnston's alphabet for the Underground. Note variant 'W'.

- Johnston, Edward (2017) [1906]. Writing & Illuminating & Lettering. illustrations by Johnston & Rooke. Dover Publications. ISBN 0-486-28534-0.
- —— (1986). Lessons in Formal Writing. Taplinger Publishing Company. ISBN 0-8008-4642-7.
- —— (1909). Manuscript & Inscription Letters. 5 plates by Gill, at least one engraved by Rooke. London: John Hogg.
- —— (1913). Jackson, F. Ernest; Mason, J. H.; Johnston, Edward; Meynell, Gerard T. (eds.). articles about calligraphy (The Imprint ed.). Covent Garden, London: The Imprint Publishing Company.
- —— (1990). Decoration and Its Uses. Tenspeed. ISBN 0-89815-401-4.
  - First publication of this text appeared in "The Imprint", 1913, vol. 1: pp. 7–14, vol. 2: pp. 128–133
- —— (1914). The House of David, his Inheritance: A Book of Sample Scripts (manuscript on vellum ed.). London: Victoria and Albert Museum.
- —— (1966). J. P. Hartman (ed.). The House of David, his Inheritance: A Book of Sample Scripts 1914 A.D. facsimile of the manuscript, original in: Victoria and Albert Museum: Victoria and Albert Museum. p. 32. ISBN 0-11-290236-7.
- —— (1971). Heather Child (ed.). Formal Penmanship and other papers. London: Lund Humphries Publishers Limited. p. 156.
- —— (1915). A carol and other rhymes. London: Hampshire House Workshops.
- —— (1937). Robert Bridges (ed.). "Penmanschip" in: in: S.P.E. Tract no. XXVIII, "English Handwriting" (second impression ed.). Oxford: Oxford University Press. pp. 239–245.
