= Walter Hilliard Bidwell =

American magazine editor (1798–1881)

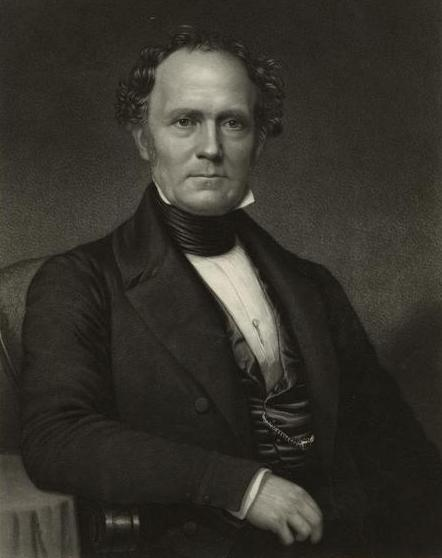
- Engraving of Bidwell by John Sartain
- Born: June 21, 1798; Farmington, Connecticut, U.S.
- Died: September 11, 1881 (aged 83); Saratoga Springs, New York, U.S.
- Education: Yale College
- Occupations: Preacher; magazine editor
- Spouse: Susan M. Duryea

Walter Hilliard Bidwell (June 21, 1798 – September 11, 1881) was an American magazine editor and preacher.

== Early life ==
Walter Hilliard Bidwell was born on June 21, 1798, in Farmington, Connecticut, to Mary (née Pelton) and William Bidwell. His father was a farmer. He joined Yale College in the sophomore class in 1824 and graduated in 1827. In 1829, he entered Yale Divinity School and became licensed to preach in 1833.

== Career ==
Bidwell was ordained pastor of the Congregational Church in Medfield, Massachusetts. After issues with his voice, he left the pastorate after four years and moved to Philadelphia.

In 1841, Bidwell became editor of the monthly periodical American National Preacher. He ran the magazine for most years until 1867. In April 1843, he became proprietor and editor of the New York Evangelist. He continued with this publication for 11 years. In 1846, he became proprietor of the American Biblical Repository and remained with the publication until 1849. From 1848 to 1852, he published a series of seven missionary maps made by his brother reverend O. B. Bidwell. He became proprietor of the Eclectic Magazine of Foreign Literature and remained associated with that periodical until 1868. He traveled to Europe six times throughout his career, some for his health and some for the Eclectic Magazine. In 1867, he was appointed Special Commissioner of the United States by Secretary of State William H. Seward and traveled to Western Asia and to Greece, Egypt, Palestine, Syria and Turkey. In the fall of 1860, he was proprietor and publisher of the American Theological Review and it merged with the Presbyterian Quarterly Review in 1862. In 1868, he retired.

== Personal life ==
Bidwell married Susan M. Duryea of New York. Following retirement, he moved to Oberlin, Ohio and then to Chicago.

A few weeks before his death, Bidwell went to Saratoga Springs, New York. He died there on September 11, 1881.
