= Fowell Buxton =

English politician (1786–1845)

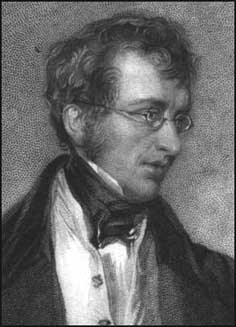
Sir Thomas Fowell Buxton, 1st Baronet Buxton of Belfield and Runton

Sir Thomas Fowell Buxton, 1st Baronet Buxton of Belfield and Runton (1 April 1786 – 19 February 1845), was an English Member of Parliament, brewer, abolitionist and social reformer. He married Hannah Gurney, whose sister became Elizabeth Fry, and became a great friend of her brother Joseph John Gurney and the extended Gurney family.

== Early life ==
Buxton was born at Castle Hedingham, Essex. His father, also named Thomas Fowell Buxton, died young, leaving three sons and two daughters. His Quaker mother's maiden name was Anna Hanbury. He completed his education at Trinity College Dublin, graduating in 1807.

Through his mother's influence Buxton became associated with the Gurney family of Earlham Hall, Norwich, especially with Joseph John Gurney and Gurney's sister, the prison reformer Elizabeth Fry. He married their sister Hannah in May 1807. He lived at Belfield House, Weymouth, Dorset, in the constituency he represented as an MP, and later at Northrepps Hall in Norfolk, where he died aged 57,

In 1808, Buxton's Hanbury connections led to an appointment to work at the brewery of Truman, Hanbury & Company, in Brick Lane, Spitalfields, London. In 1811 he was made a partner in the business, renamed Truman, Hanbury, Buxton & Co, and later its sole owner.

Although he was a member of the Church of England, Buxton attended Quaker meetings with some of the Gurneys, and so became involved in the social reform movement, in which Friends were prominent. He helped to raise money for the weavers of London, who were being forced into poverty by the factory system. He provided financial support for Elizabeth Fry's prison reform work and joined her Association for the Improvement of the Female Prisoners in Newgate.

Buxton was elected to Parliament for Weymouth and Melcombe Regis in 1818. As an MP, he worked for changes in prison conditions and criminal law and for the abolition of slavery, in which he was helped by his sister-in-law Louisa Gurney Hoare. He also opposed capital punishment and pushed for its abolition. Although he never accomplished that, he worked to restrict the crimes for which capital punishment could be meted, whose number eventually fell from more than 200 to eight (8). Other moves for which Buxton argued were the suppression of lotteries and abolition of suttee, the practice of burning widows in India.

Thomas and Hannah Buxton had eight children, but four died of whooping cough over a five-week period around April 1820. Another died of consumption some time later. Hannah would send boxes of toys to the missionary Anna Hinderer in Nigeria in 1855. By 1866, her grandchildren were parcelling them up.

== Abolitionism ==
Buxton is on the left edge in this painting, which is of the 1840 World Anti-Slavery Convention. Move cursor to identify him or click icon to enlarge

The slave trade had been abolished in 1807, but existing slavery remained and Buxton joined in the campaign to abolish it. In 1823, he helped to found the British and Foreign Anti-Slavery Society (later the Anti-Slavery Society). In May 1823, Buxton introduced in the House of Commons a resolution condemning the state of slavery as "repugnant to the principles of the British constitution and of the Christian religion", and called for its gradual abolition "throughout the British colonies". He also pressured the government to send dispatches to the colonies to improve the treatment of slaves.

Buxton took over as leader of the abolition movement in the British House of Commons after William Wilberforce retired in 1825. The petition he presented to the House of Commons bore 187,000 signatures. This had been partly organised by Priscilla Buxton in 1833; she and Amelia Opie were the first two signatories.

He largely achieved his goal when slavery was officially abolished in the British Empire with the passage of his Slavery Abolition Act 1833, except in India and Ceylon. Buxton held his seat in Parliament until 1837.

In 1836, with Sir Stephen Lushington, Buxton helped transfer the Funds of Lady Mico Charity to establish educational institutions in the West Indies for children of ex-slaves. Mico University College in Kingston, Jamaica is a remnant of that initiative.

In 1839, Buxton urged the British government to make treaties with African leaders to abolish the slave trade. The government in turn backed the Niger expedition of 1841 (not including Buxton) put together by missionary organizations, which was also going to work on trade. More than 150 people were part of the expedition, which reached the Niger Delta and began negotiations. The British suffered such high mortality from fevers, with more than 25 per cent of the group dying rapidly, that the mission was cut short in 1841.

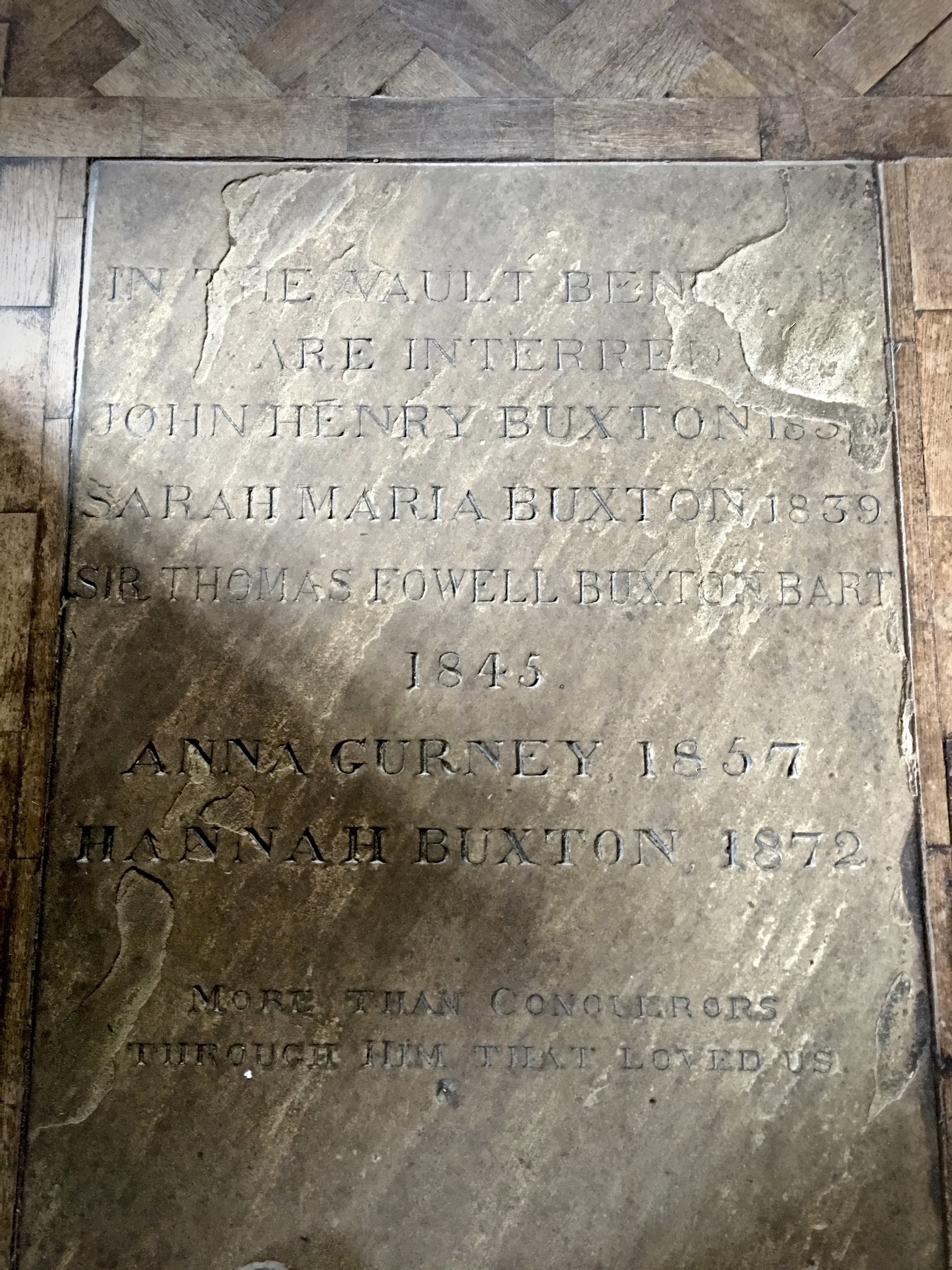
The Buxton vault in Overstrand Church

David Livingstone was strongly influenced by Buxton's arguments that the African slave trade might be destroyed through the influence of "legitimate trade" (in goods) and the spread of Christianity. He became a missionary in Africa and fought the slave trade all his life.

On 30 July 1840, Buxton was created a baronet. His health failed gradually – according to some, due to disappointment over the failed mission to Africa. He died five years later at his home, Northrepps Hall, near Cromer, Norfolk and was buried at Overstrand, Norfolk. He also owned farms and woodland at Runton nearby (now the Runton Old Hall estate).

== Founding RSPCA chairman ==
On 16 June 1824, a meeting was held at Old Slaughter's Coffee House, St Martin's Lane, London, at which was created the Society for the Prevention of Cruelty to Animals – it became the RSPCA when Queen Victoria gave royal assent in 1840.

The 22 founding members included William Wilberforce, Richard Martin, Sir James Mackintosh, Basil Montagu and Reverend Arthur Broome. Buxton was appointed chairman for the year 1824.

== Legacy and honours ==
- A monument to Sir Thomas Fowell Buxton stands in Westminster Abbey.
- A memorial to the emancipation of slaves, dedicated to Buxton, was installed in Victoria Tower Gardens. Commissioned by his son Charles Buxton MP, the Buxton Memorial Fountain was designed by Samuel Sanders Teulon and installed in Parliament Square. In 1940 it was removed during the German bombings of London in World War II. It was installed at its present location in 1957.
- A village in Guyana was named "Buxton" when it was purchased by former slaves in 1840. It was previously called Plantation New Orange Nassau.
- A plaque is dedicated to him in Norwich Cathedral and another at the Norwich Friends Meeting House.
- A bust of him by John Bell appears in St. George's Cathedral, Freetown, Sierra Leone.
- Fowell Close in Norwich is named after him.
- A representation of Buxton was printed on the English five-pound note used between 2002 and 2017. He is the figure wearing glasses in the group to the left of Elizabeth Fry.
- In Weymouth, Dorset, which he served for 19 years as MP, the main route to the Isle of Portland is named Buxton Road. It runs past Belfield House, his former home in Wyke Regis.
- A permanent memorial to him was unveiled in 2017 on Bincleaves Green in Weymouth.

The memorial on Bincleaves Green:

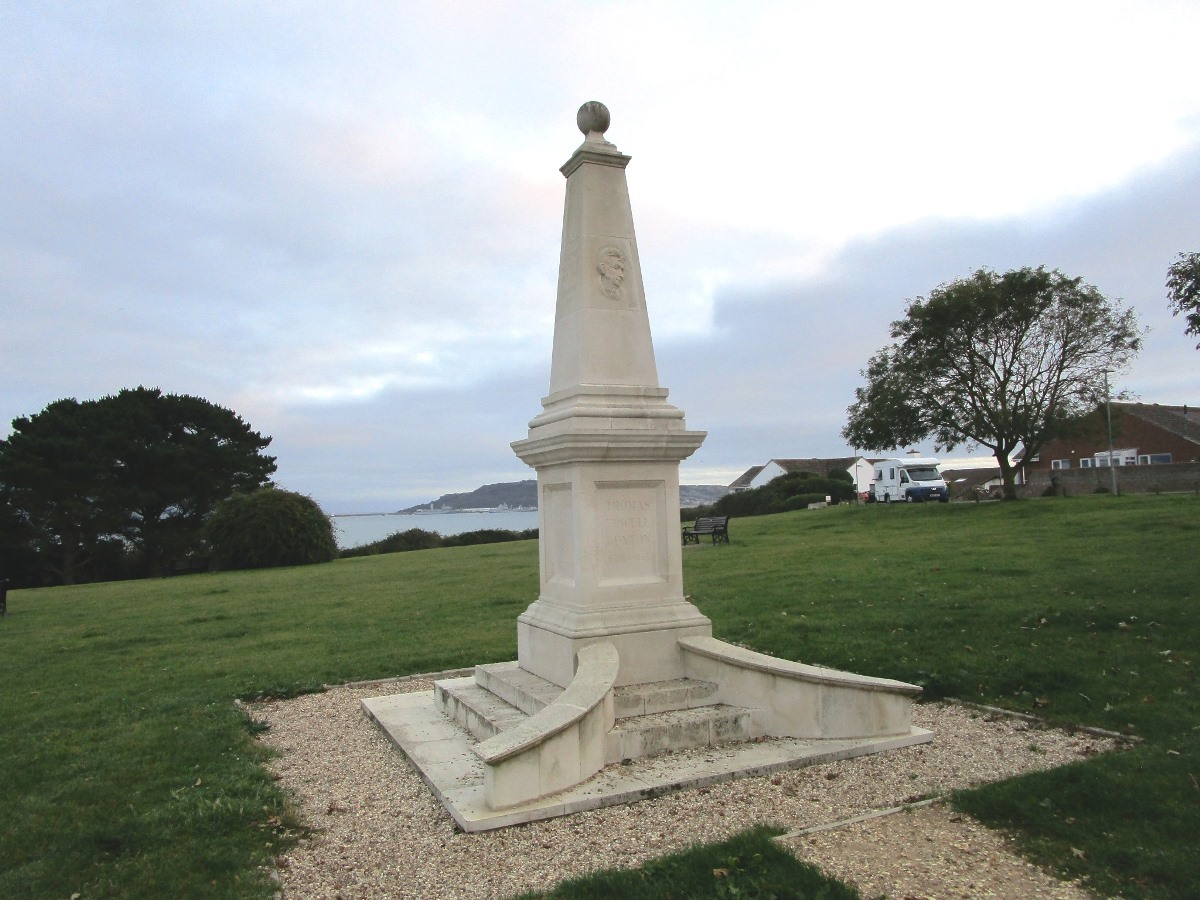

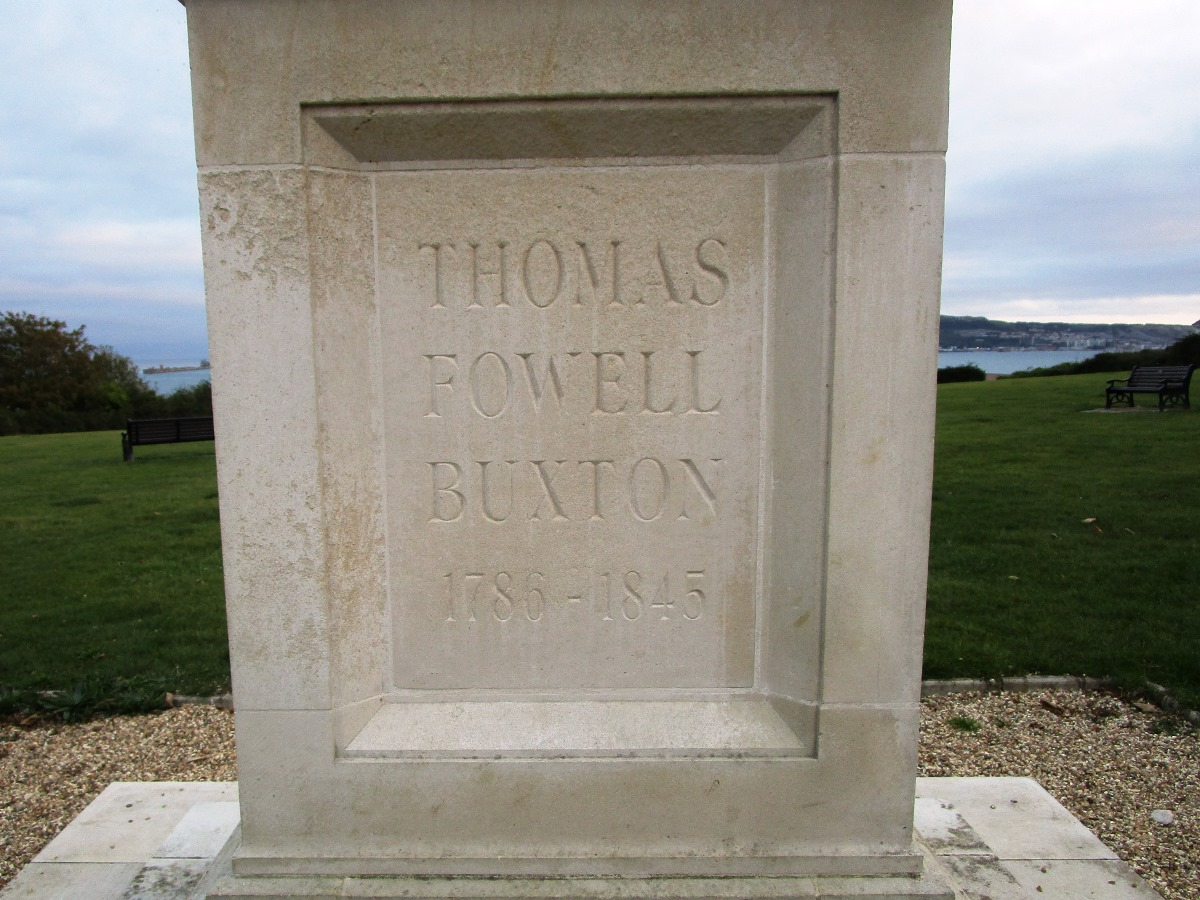

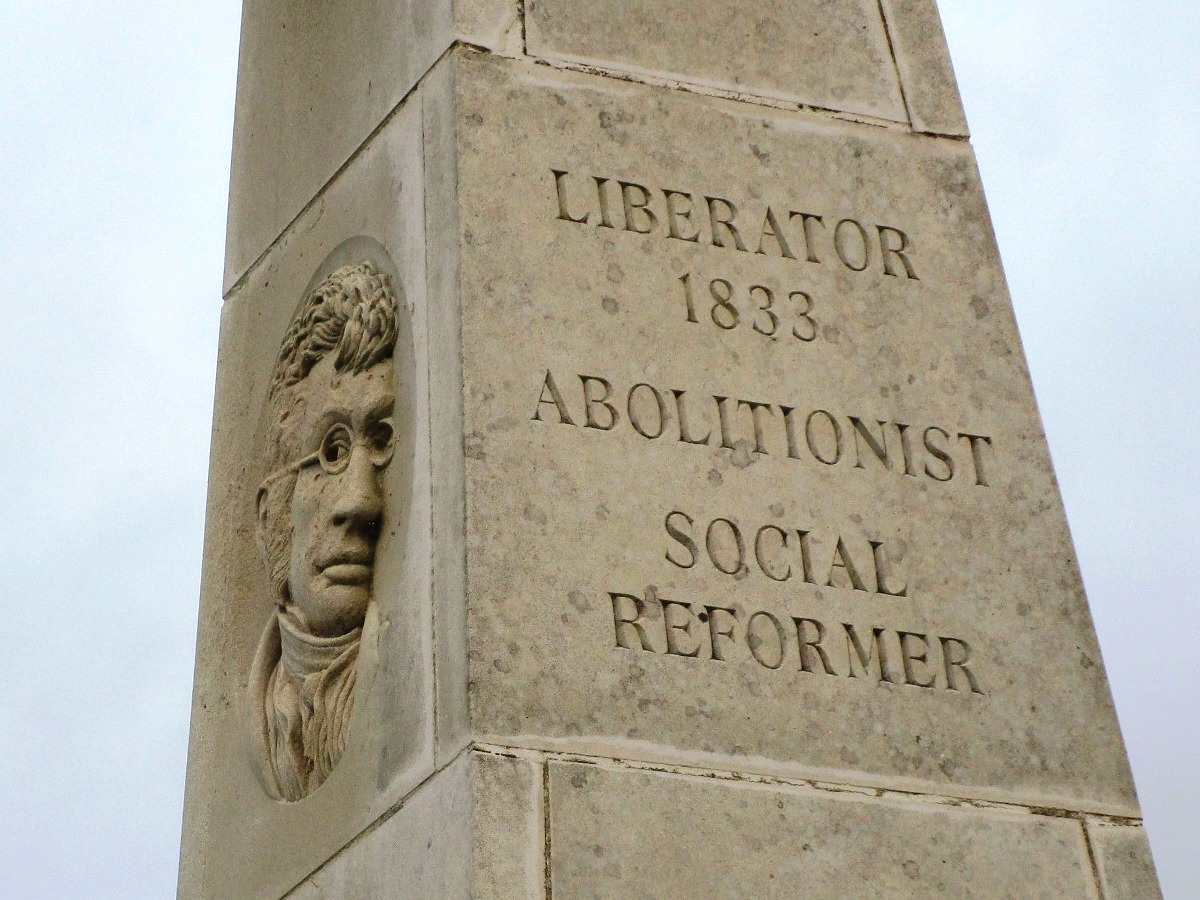

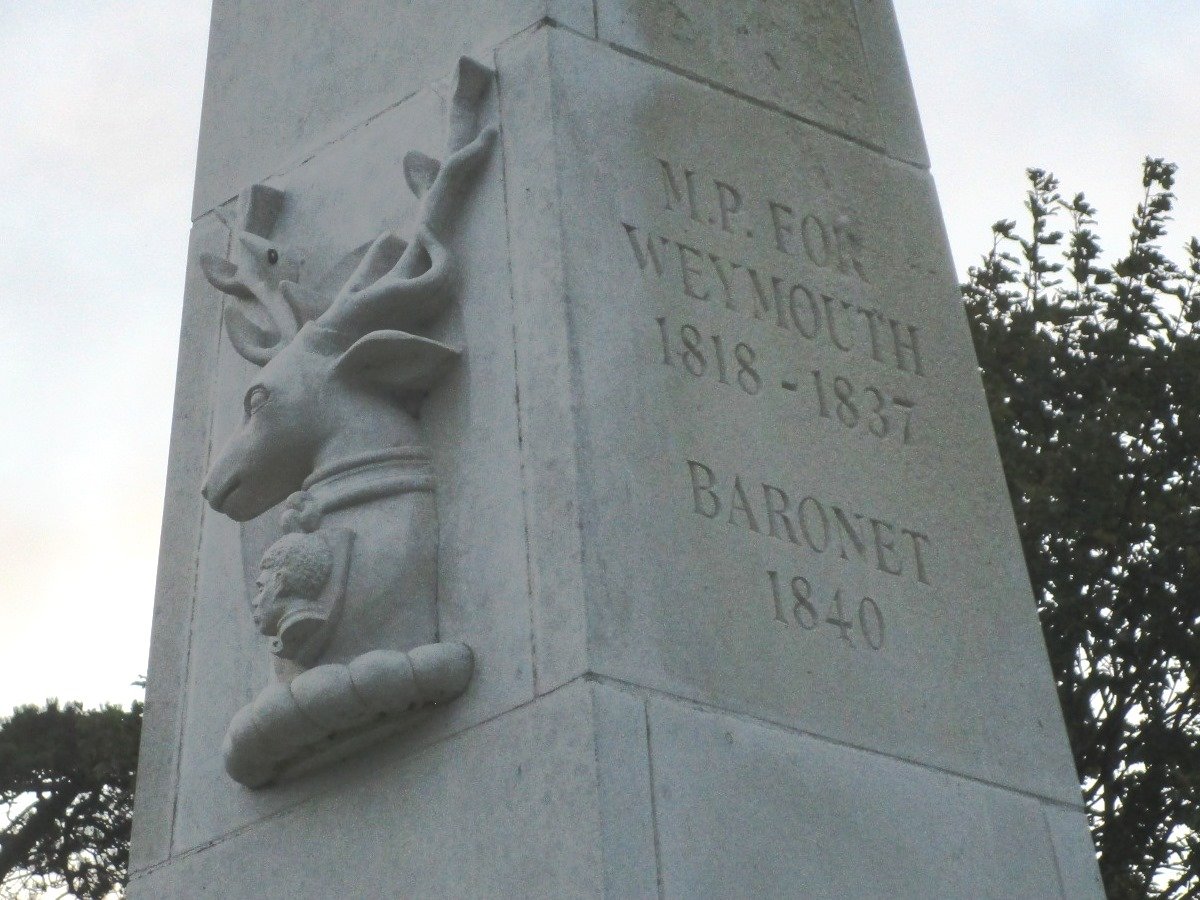

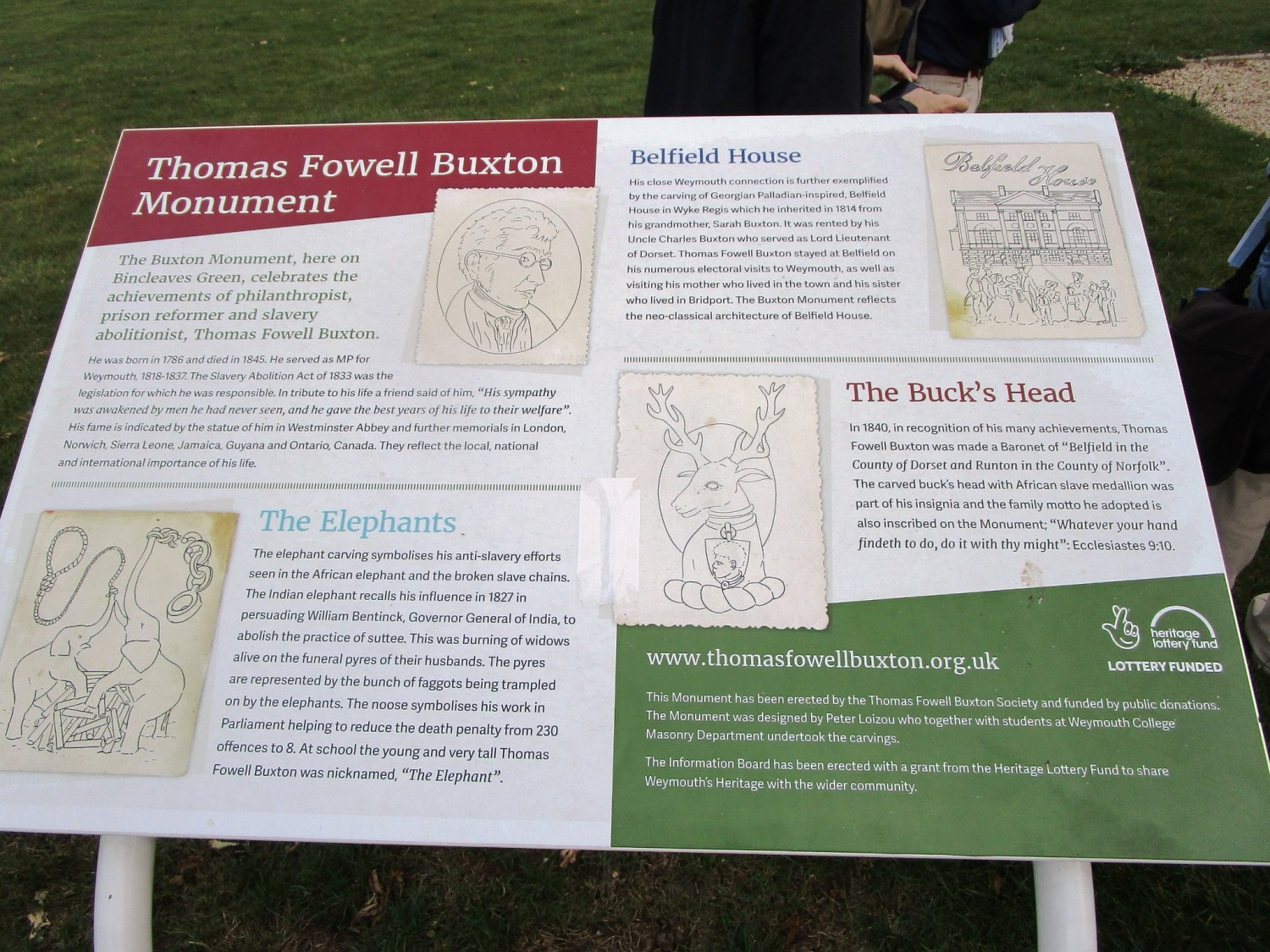

== Descendants ==
Buxton had a number of notable descendants through his five sons and six daughters:

Sir Edward North Buxton, 2nd Baronet (1812–1858) married Catherine Gurney (1814–1911). They had seven sons and five daughters.

Sir Thomas Fowell Buxton, 3rd Baronet (1837–1915) married Lady Victoria Noel (1840–1916).

Sir Thomas Fowell Victor Buxton, 4th Baronet (1865–1919)
Noel Edward Noel-Buxton, 1st Baron Noel-Buxton (1869–1948)
Charles Roden Buxton (1875–1942)
Harold Jocelyn Buxton (1880–1976)
Leland William Wilberforce Buxton (1884–1967)

Samuel Gurney Buxton (1838 – February 1909) of Catton served as High Sheriff of Norfolk in 1891–1892.
Edward North Buxton, MP (1840–1924)
Henry Edmund Buxton (1844–1905)
Charles Louis Buxton (1846–1906)
Francis William Buxton (1847–1911)

Thomas Fowell Buxton (1822–1908) married Rachel Gurney (1823–1905) and had six sons and five daughters.

Elizabeth Ellen Buxton (later Barclay) (1848–1919)
John Henry Buxton (1849–1934), director of Truman, Hanbury, Buxton Brewery, chairman of the London Hospital

Arthur Buxton (1882–1958), Rector of All Souls Church, Langham Place, and Chaplain to the Forces
Margaret Katherine Buxton (1885–1974)

David Charles McClintock (1913–2001), natural historian, botanist, horticulturist and author

Geoffrey Fowell Buxton (1852–1929), a director of Barclays Bank
Alfred Fowell Buxton (1854–1952), chairman of London County Council
Barclay Fowell Buxton (1860–1946), missionary

Murray Barclay Buxton (1889–1940)
Alfred Barclay Buxton (1891–1940)
George Barclay Buxton (1892–1917)
Barclay Godfrey Buxton (1895–1986)

Charles Buxton, MP (1823–1871) married Emily Mary Holland (1824–1908) and had two sons and four daughters.

Bertram Henry Buxton (1852–1934)
Sydney Buxton, 1st Earl Buxton, MP (1853–1934)

Andrew Robert Fowell Buxton CMG b.1939- Chairman of Barclays Bank

Priscilla Buxton (1808–1852) married Andrew Johnston, MP (c. 1798–1862) and had two sons and four daughters.

Andrew Johnston, MP (1835–1895)
Fowell Buxton Johnston (1839–1914), army officer, married Alice Douglas (1846–1891).

Edward Johnston (1872–1944), calligrapher

Thomas Mark Buxton (born 1874)

== Writings ==
- An Enquiry, Whether Crime and Misery are produced or prevented by our present system of Prison Discipline (1818)
- The African Slave Trade and Its Remedy (London: J. Murray, 1839)

== See also ==
- Travers Buxton

== Bibliography ==
- Barclay, Oliver (2001). Thomas Fowell Buxton and the liberation of slaves. York: William Sessions.
- Binney, Thomas (1853) [1849]. Sir Thomas Fowell Buxton, Bart. A study for young men. London: J. Nisbet & Co.
- Buxton, Charles, ed. (1848). Memoirs of Sir Thomas Fowell Buxton Bart. London.
- Buxton, Thomas (2009) [first published 1818]. An Inquiry, whether Crime and Misery are Produced or Prevented, by our Present System of Prison Discipline. Cambridge Library Collection – British and Irish History, 19th Century. Cambridge University Press. ISBN 978-1-108-00492-3.
- Follett, Richard R. (2008). "After Emancipation: Thomas Fowell Buxton and Evangelical Politics in the 1830s". Parliamentary History. 27: 119–129. doi:10.1111/j.1750-0206.2007.00015.x.
- Laidlaw, Zoe (2004). "Aunt Anna's Report: The Buxton Women and the Aborigines Select Committee, 1835–37". Journal of Imperial and Commonwealth History. 32 (2): 1–28. doi:10.1080/03086530410001700381. S2CID 159690400.
- Rodriguez, Junius P. (2007). Encyclopedia of Emancipation and Abolition in the Transatlantic World. Armonk, NY: M. E. Sharpe.
- Sheridan, Richard B. (2002). "The Condition of slaves on the sugar plantations of Sir John Gladstone in the colony of Demerara 1812 to 1849". New West Indian Guide. 76 (3/4): 243–269. doi:10.1163/13822373-90002536. hdl:1808/21075.
- Temperley, Howard (1972). British antislavery, 1833–1870. Columbia: University of South Carolina Press.
- Walls, Andrew (1991). "The Legacy of Thomas Fowell Buxton". International Bulletin of Missionary Research. 15 (2): 74–77. doi:10.1177/239693939101500207. S2CID 149038483.

Parliament of the United Kingdom
Preceded by Masterton Ure; Christopher Idle; Adolphus Dalrymple	Member of Parliament for Weymouth and Melcombe Regis; 1818–1837; With: 4-seat constituency until 1832, then 2-seat Masterton Ure, to 1832; Thomas Wallace, 1818–1828; John Gordon, 1826–1832; Edward Sugden, 1828–1831; Richard Weyland, 1831; Charles Baring Wall, 1831–1832; Sir Frederick George Johnstone, Bt, 1832–1835; William Wharton Burden, from 1835	Succeeded by George Child-Villiers; George William Hope
Baronetage of the United Kingdom
New creation	Baronet (of Belfield); 1840–1845	Succeeded by Edward North Buxton
